= Ask the Deep =

Studio album by Sóley
- Released: 8 May 2015
- Recorded: 2014–2015
- Genres: Dream pop; indie rock
- Length: 36:22
- Label: Morr Music

Sóley chronology
Krómantík (2014)	Ask the Deep (2015)	Don't Ever Listen (2015)

Singles from Ask the Deep
- 1. "Ævintýr" Released: 24 February 2015; 2. "Follow Me Down" Released: 24 March 2015; 3. "Halloween" Released: 17 April 2015

Ask the Deep is the second album by Icelandic singer-songwriter Sóley released in 2015 through Morr Music.

== Background ==
Sóley released her first album We Sink in 2011 and released two EPs, titled Theater Island and Krómantík, in 2010 and 2014 respectively. She planned to release her second full-length album in 2013 or early 2014. However the album's release was delayed after Sóley became pregnant in 2012. The theme for the album was initially around the deep blue sea and night before developing into an album exploring "how deep you can go within your mind". Sóley used the recording period for the album as a chance to take a break from looking after her daughter, commenting that "it was really good just not to be a mom for an hour or something and just write down some horror songs".

The majority of the album's songs were premiered at the 2014 Iceland Airwaves Festival.

Five songs from the recording sessions that did not make the final album were later released on the EP Don't Ever Listen later in 2015. The songs had been omitted from the final track list because Sóley wanted Ask the Deep to have fewer guitar sounds.

== Reception ==
Professional ratings
Review scores
Source	Rating
AllMusic	4/5 stars
Consequence	Mixed
Iceland Review	5/5 stars
New Noise Magazine	Positive
PopMatters	7/10 stars
The Line of Best Fit	8/10 stars
NBHAP	4.7/5 stars

In a review for AllMusic, Timothy Monger praised the album as "smart, intimate, and challenging" and "a bold second effort from an intriguing artist". He noted that Ask the Deep built "on the elegantly moody art pop of her 2011 debut We Sink" and was "ultimately bigger in scope". He also described the "dreamy world of treated pianos, smoky synth textures, glitchy beats, and Sóley's quietly engaging vocals" found on the album. Monger selected "Devil", "One Eyed Lady", "Dreamers" and the "Philip Glass-inspired" "Follow Me Down" as the standout tracks from the album.

Edward Hancox rated the album 5 out of 5 in his review for Iceland Review. He described the album as "a thing of dark beauty" and "something truly unique".

Ian King of PopMatters gave the album a rating of 7 out of 10 and described the album as "bigger and darker than its predecessor". He highlighted "Sóley's unique and arresting voice, which can conjure fairy worlds all on its own".

James Appleyard rated the album 8 out 10 in a review for The Line of Best Fit. He noted the album's lyrics "hark back to a traditionally macabre narrative style readily present in Icelandic culture" and "Sóley manages to draw you into her world giving you a warm embrace with skeleton hands". While Appleyard felt the songs on Ask the Deep were not "as immediate as those on Sóley's previous output", he praised the album for showcasing "introspective pop".

Tom Haugen of New Noise Magazine noted that "Sóley extends deeper into introspective song craft" compared to her first album, and "gentle pop moments are often buried under moody atmospheres and dark fairy tales" on Ask the Deep, which "encapsulates the imagination and mystery that seems endemic to Icelandic music".

NBHAP magazine named Ask the Deep its "Album of the Week" and reviewer Norman Fleischer rated the album 4.7 stars out of 5. Fleischer described the album as "a captivating and diversified piece of ambitious dark songwriter pop" and one that "[gave] an insight into the fragile and sometimes even morbid thoughts of the songwriter". He added that "there's substance in every note and honesty in all of these ten melodies" and called the album overall "haunting, honest and ambitious".

In a more mixed review for Consequence magazine, Sasha Geffen felt that the album "grazes a darkness that [Sóley is] unwilling to plumb thoroughly" and noted that "the songs [...] rarely [plunge] into the sadness and anger that show themselves in flickers throughout her lyrics". The songs "Devil" and "Follow Me Down" were selected as the essential tracks from the album.

=== Awards and nominations ===
Year	Organisation	Category	Work	Result	Ref.
2015	Kraumur	Kraumur Award	Ask the Deep	Nominated	

== Track listing ==
All tracks are written by Sóley Stefánsdóttir.

Ask the Deep track listing
No.	Title	Length
1.	"Devil"	4:17
2.	"Ævintýr"	3:19
3.	"One Eyed Lady"	3:58
4.	"Óhljóð"	0:37
5.	"Halloween"	4:18
6.	"Follow Me Down"	3:42
7.	"Breath"	3:15
8.	"I Will Never"	4:07
9.	"Dreamers"	4:22
10.	"Lost Ship"	4:27
Total length:		36:22

== Personnel ==
Credits taken from album liner notes.

- Sóley Stefánsdóttir – voices, piano, organs, synths, omnichord, accordion, percussion
- Albert Finnbogason – guitar, bass pedal
- Jón Óskar Jónsson – drums

== Charts ==
Weekly chart performance for Ask the Deep
Chart (2015)	Peak position
Icelandic Albums (Tónlist)	20

== Release history ==
Release date	Format	Label	ID No.	Ref.
8 May 2015	CD	Morr Music	Morr 138-CD	
8 May 2015	LP	Morr Music	Morr 138-LP	
8 May 2015	LP (Clear Vinyl with Poster)	Morr Music	Morr 138-LP LTD	
