= 2017 in Icelandic music =

The following is a list of notable events and releases of the year 2017 in Icelandic music.

== Events ==
=== February ===
- 25 – The first Semi-final of the Söngvakeppnin, Eurovishen Song contest of Iceland.

=== March ===
- 4 – The second Semi-final of the Söngvakeppnin, Eurovishen Song contest of Iceland.
- 11
  - The final of the 2017 Söngvakeppnin competition takes place in Iceland.
  - Svala Björgvinsdóttir is selected as Iceland's representative in the Eurovision Song Contest 2017.

=== April ===
- 13 – The Aldrei fór ég suður festival start in Ísafjörður (March 13 – 16).

=== June ===
- 16 – The Secret Solstice festival started in Reykjavík (June 16 – 18).

=== July ===
- 5 – The 18th Folk music festival of Siglufjordur start in Siglufjordur (July 5 – 9).

=== August ===
- 2
  - Björk announces her then-unnamed new album Utopia on social media. In an interview with Dazed and Confused magazine, she states that It’s about that search (for utopia) – and about being in love. Spending time with a person you enjoy is when the dream becomes real.

=== November ===
- 1 – The Iceland Airwaves festival start in Reykjavík (November 1 – 5).
- 24 – Björk will release her ninth album Utopia.

== Albums released ==
=== January ===
| Day | Album | Artist | Label | Notes | Ref. |
|---|---|---|---|---|---|
| 10 | Ivory Stone / Hof | Misþyrming & Sinmara | Terratur Possessions | 10" EP | |
| 20 | Music to Draw to: Satellite | Kid Koala featuring Emiliana Torrini | Kid Koala Productions | | |

=== May ===
| Day | Album | Artist | Label | Notes | Ref. |
|---|---|---|---|---|---|
| 8 | Endless Summer | Sóley | Morr Music | | |
| 26 | Berdreyminn | Sólstafir | Season Of Mist | | |
| 26 | Slør | Eivør Pálsdóttir | A&G Records | English version | |

=== July ===
| Day | Album | Artist | Label | Notes | Ref. |
|---|---|---|---|---|---|
| 14 | Kinder Versions | Mammút | Record Records | | |

=== November ===
| Day | Album | Artist | Label | Notes | Ref. |
|---|---|---|---|---|---|
| 24 | Utopia | Björk | One Little Indian | | |

== Deaths ==
February

- 27 - Jórunn Viðar, Icelandic pianist and composer (born 1918).

== See also ==
- 2017 in Iceland
- Music of Iceland
- Iceland in the Eurovision Song Contest 2017
