= Endless Summer (Sóley album) =

Studio album by Sóley
- Released: 5 May 2017
- Recorded: January–December 2016
- Genres: Indie rock; indie pop; alternative rock
- Length: 33:58
- Label: Morr Music

Sóley chronology
Don't Ever Listen (2015)	Endless Summer (2017)	Harmóník (2017)

Singles from Endless Summer
- 1. "Never Cry Moon" Released: 14 February 2017; 2. "Grow" Released: 21 March 2017

Endless Summer is the third studio album by Icelandic singer-songwriter Sóley released in 2017 through Morr Music.

== Background ==
Endless Summer took a more "optimistic" direction compared to Sóley's first two studio albums We Sink (2011) and Ask the Deep (2015). The album took inspiration from a note that Sóley wrote down when she woke up one night in January 2016, which said "Write about hope and spring". After touring Ask the Deep for a year, she felt that the project was too "heavy" and wanted to take a "u-turn" with the next album. Sóley bought a grand piano specially for this album. She felt concerned that she was becoming typecast with the sound of her previous albums, realizing that she "only made dark music in minor keys" and could now "also use major chords".

The album's opening song "Úa" is named after Sóley's daughter.

== Reception ==
Professional ratings
Review scores
Source	Rating
AllMusic	4/5 stars
The Line of Best Fit	8/10 stars
Paste	Positive
SLUG	Positive

The album received a positive review from Marcy Donelson writing for AllMusic. Donelson contrasted the album's "more whimsical tone and piano-centric palette" to the "contemplative, overcast chamber electro-pop" of Sóley's first two albums. The opening song "Úa" was highlighted as an "intimate piece, full of sweetness and dissonance" which "incorporates twinkling mallet percussion, horns, strings, and howling vocals in turn, with the overall effect of an off-kilter nursery rhyme". Donelson compared some parts of the album to the work of Camille Saint-Saëns' The Carnival of the Animals in terms of "palette and technique", and the "similarly fantastical charm and discreet volume".

In a review for the magazine The Line of Best Fit, James Appleyard gave the album a score of 8 out of 10. He described Endless Summer as "the bright yin to the dark yang of its predecessor". He noted the opening song "Úa" showcased "Sóley's classically trained skills as a pianist, as well as her natural ear for a solid pop melody". The songs "Never Cry Moon" and "Grow" were described as the "centrepiece" of the album, working together as a "miniature orchestral suite that echo back at one another".

Writing for Paste, Max Freedman described the album as "vivid, bright, and resplendent" compared to her earlier work, as well as "more fleshed out and beautifully arranged compared to the crushing simplicity of Sóley's previous work".

The album was described as "flawless" in a SLUG magazine review by Alex Vermillion, who felt that it captured "the icy, delicate atmosphere of her previous albums" despite the change of sound.

== Track listing ==
All tracks are written by Sóley Stefánsdóttir.

Endless Summer track listing
No.	Title	Length
1.	"Úa"	4:31
2.	"Sing Wood to Silence"	5:03
3.	"Inbetween"	1:05
4.	"Never Cry Moon"	3:36
5.	"Grow"	4:40
6.	"Before Falling"	2:45
7.	"Traveler"	5:24
8.	"Endless Summer"	6:51
Total length:		33:58

== Personnel ==
Credits taken from album liner notes.

- Sóley Stefánsdóttir – Vocals, Piano, Organ, Marimba, Vibraphone, Accordion, Omnichord, Percussion, Electric Piano
- Albert Finnbogason – Electric Guitar, Acoustic Guitar, Bass Guitar, Slide Guitar, Banjo, Synthesizer, Drums, Electric Piano
- Ingibjörg Birgisdóttir - Artwork
- Jón Óskar Jónsson – Drums
- Þórdís Gerður Jónsdóttir – Cello
- Rósa Guðrún Sveinsdóttir – Flute
- Sigrún Jónsdóttir – Clarinet
- Sigrún Kristbjörg Jónsdóttir – Violin, Trombone

== Release history ==
Release date	Format	Label	ID No.	Ref.
5 May 2017	CD	Morr Music	Morr 154-CD	
5 May 2017	LP	Morr Music	Morr 154-LP	
5 May 2017	LP (Turquoise vinyl with Poster)	Morr Music		

== See also ==
- 2017 in Icelandic music
