= Los Gurkos Short Film Festival =

Austrian film festival

The Los Gurkos Short Film Festival is an Austrian film festival. It was created in 2005 and takes place every year in Innsbruck, Austria. The main focus of the festival is on the short film competition, which provides a possibility for local and international filmmakers to present their craft. At the same time, the festival promotes the genre of the short in Innsbruck and Tyrol. The Los Gurkos Short Film Festival regularly works together with the International Film Festival Innsbruck and the Rejected Film Festival.

The Los Gurkos Short Film Festival is an open festival and does therefore not require entries to comply with a certain theme, but only with the technical guidelines. On November 9, 2013, the festival will take place for the ninth time at the PMK in Innsbruck. After the approximately ten best entries have been shown, an expert panel chooses the three winning shorts. The festival award has symbolic value: the Golden Cucumber (after dice in 2010, cucumber plants in 2011 and graffiti in 2012).

== Winners of the goldene Gurke (golden cucumber) ==
Year	Film/Country	Director
2008	Neger Regen (1s place/ex aequo, AT)	Alexandra Bachlechner and Georg Simbetti
2008	Solitary soul (1st place/ex aequo, AT)	Clemens Wirth
2008	Kharm´s Traum (3rd place, AT)	Peter Chiochetti
2009	8 Kompositionen (1st place, AT)	Katharina Cibulka
2009	The Devil’s Ride (2nd place, AT)	Bernhard Dengg
2009	Inkognito (3rd place, AT)	Viktor Kössl
2010	Macro Kingdom (non-narrative, AT)	Clemens Wirth
2010	Ménage a trois (narrative, AT)	Matteo Sanders
2011	Das schöne Leben (AT)	Tobias Pichler
2011	Der Angriff (AT)	Harald Schwarzmann
2011	Les Fleurs du mal (AT)	Marco Trenkwalder
2012	Volkspark (1st place, GER)	TEAM MOBTIK
2012	St. Martin (2nd place, GER)	Clemens Purner
2012	Milonga (3rd place, ITA)	Marco Calvise
2013	Doors (1st place, AT)	Tobias Pichler
2013	LusTiger (2nd place, AT/CH)	Stefan Holaus
2013	Postcard from Mars (3rd place, AT)	Peter Chiochetti

== Bands which have performed at the Los Gurkos Film Festival ==
Festival edition	Band
2008	Duo505
2009	Borko, It's a Musical, Sin Fang
2010	Mambo Kurt, Bensh
2011	B.Fleischmann
2012	Masha Qrella, Joasihno
2013	Zeta Primes, Saroos
