= We Sink =

Studio album by Sóley
- Released: 2 September 2011
- Recorded: 2010–2011
- Genre: Avant-pop; indie folk
- Length: 47:34
- Label: Morr Music

Sóley chronology
Theater Island (2010)	We Sink (2011)	Krómantík (2014)

Singles from We Sink
- 1. "Pretty Face" Released: 15 May 2012

We Sink is the first album by Icelandic singer-songwriter Sóley. It was released in 2011 through Morr Music and was her second major release with the label following her 2010 extended play Theater Island.

== Background ==
Sóley became part of the band Seabear in 2006 and released two albums and an extended play with them from 2007 to 2010. While touring with Seabear, she received an E-mail from Thomas Morr, head of Morr Music, asking if she had any songs she wished to release. She sent some demos and four months later her debut solo release, the extended play Theater Island, was released in March 2010 with Morr Music. Three songs from this EP – "Blue Leaves", "Kill the Clown" and "Theater Island" – would later be included on We Sink.

The song "Smashed Birds" was first written on a piano, but was changed to guitar during the recording sessions.

== Reception ==
Professional ratings
Review scores
Source	Rating
AllMusic	4/5 stars
Iceland Review	3/5 stars

Ned Raggett of AllMusic noted that Sóley had worked on "her own particular tradition of avant-pop" and the album showcased a "sense of mournful elegance and quiet joys", with Sóley singing with "half-sweet naif, half-contemplation over an understated variety of arrangements and textures". He also noted that some songs on the album had "stark acoustic guitar and soft singing" which lent a "skeletal Mazzy Star feeling to things". The song "Pretty Face" was described as a "combination of smoky Julee Cruise ballad and fast-paced, Latin-tinged sprightly kick". The songs "Smashed Birds", "Pretty Face" and "About Your Funeral" were highlighted as standout tracks from the album.

Katharina Hauptmann of Iceland Review gave the album three out of five stars. She commented that the album had two different sides, one that had "Sóley's beautiful, delicate piano arrangements accompanied by fragile percussion elements and her velvety voice" while the other had "something darker and more sinister", the latter of the two being what Hauptmann wished We Sink had more of. She felt the songs "I'll Drown", "Kill the Clown", "Fight Them Soft" and "The Sun is Going Down II" were the strongest songs from the album.

NPR Music selected "I'll Drown" as the "Song of the Day" on October 20, 2011. In the review, it was noted that "the magic of [Sóley's] songwriting lies in [a] liminal space, poised between lo-fi quaintness and dark surrealism".

=== Awards and nominations ===
Year	Organisation	Category	Work	Result	Ref.
2011	Kraumur	Kraumur Award	We Sink	Won	
2011	Icelandic Music Awards	Pop & Rock – Album of the Year	We Sink	Nominated	
2011	Icelandic Music Awards	Pop & Rock – Songwriter of the Year	Sóley	Nominated	
2011	Icelandic Music Awards	Best Music Video	"Smashed Birds" (Director: Ingibjörg Birgisdóttir)	Won	

== Track listing ==
All tracks are written by Sóley Stefánsdóttir.

No.	Title	Length
1.	"I'll Drown"	3:32
2.	"Smashed Birds"	3:43
3.	"Pretty Face"	4:40
4.	"Bad Dream"	2:14
5.	"Dance"	4:03
6.	"And Leave"	3:29
7.	"Blue Leaves"	2:50
8.	"Kill the Clown"	3:43
9.	"Fight Them Soft"	1:30
10.	"About Your Funeral"	6:09
11.	"The Sun is Going Down I"	2:12
12.	"The Sun is Going Down II"	5:32
13.	"Theater Island"	3:56
Total length:		47:34

Note: Vinyl repressings from 2013 onwards include three additional songs from the out of print Theater Island EP: "Dutla", "Read Your Book" and "We Will Put Her in Two Graves".

== Personnel ==
Credits taken from album liner notes.

- Sóley Stefánsdóttir – Voices, Piano, Synths, Guitars, Organs, Percussion, Marimba, Noises
- Simon Nykjær – Bass
- Jin Óskar Jónsson – Drums
- Sindri Már Sigfússon – Electric Guitar
- Sigrún Jónsdóttir – Clarinet
- Héðinn Finnsson – Noise/Drones
- Eiríkur Rafn Stefánsson – Voice

== Charts ==
Weekly chart performance for We Sink
Chart (2012)	Peak position
Icelandic Albums (Tónlist)	11

== Release history ==
Release date	Format	Edition	Label	ID No.	Ref.
2 September 2011	CD	Standard	Morr Music	Morr 107-CD	
2 September 2011	2×LP	Standard	Morr Music	Morr 107-DLP	
2 September 2011	Digital Download	Standard	Morr Music	–	
2013	2×LP	Expanded	Morr Music	Morr 107-DLP	
2014	2×LP (Clear Vinyl)	Expanded	Morr Music	Morr 107-DLP	
5 June 2015	2×LP (Pink Vinyl)	Expanded	Morr Music	Morr 107-DLP	
