= Mother Melancholia =

Studio album by Sóley
- Released: 22 October 2021
- Recorded: 2018–2021 (Note: The accordion version of "Circles" was recorded in 2018.)
- Studio: Sóley's studio; Albert Finnbogason's studio (additional production); Sundlaugin (Strings and Percussion)
- Length: 44:53
- Label: SMIT/Lovitt Records
- Producer: Sóley Stefánsdóttir

Sóley chronology
Harmóník I & II (2020)	Mother Melancholia (2021)	Dream Is Murder (2021)

Singles from Mother Melancholia
- 1. "Sunrise Skulls" Released: 1 October 2021; 2. "Circles" Released: 17 December 2021; 3. "Parasite" Released: 4 February 2022

Mother Melancholia is the fourth solo studio album released by Icelandic singer-songwriter Sóley released in 2021. The album was "inspired by the mass suicide of mankind and destruction of life led by capitalism and toxic masculinity". The Reykjavík Grapevine described it as "a eulogy for the planet and humankind".

== Background ==
The album was planned for release much earlier but this was delayed due to the COVID-19 pandemic.

Mother Melancholia was Sóley's first album to be released independently, after her first three albums were released through Morr Music. After completing her record deal, she felt that she now had "a new sense of freedom" and felt freed "from the pressure of the music industry".

For this album, Sóley bought a cello, theremin and mellotron and experimented with these instruments. Playing other instruments rather than the familiar piano allowed her to "be free from the complex classical background". Sóley described the album as "Nosferatu meets Thelma and Louise in a vampire church under the watchful eye of David Lynch".

Eco-feminism was a large influence on the album. Sóley stated that the album was conceptualised as representing "the end of the world", with feminism and the environmental impact of humans on the planet becoming part of the album's themes.

The album's opening song and lead single "Sunrise Skulls" was inspired by the #MeToo and SlutWalk movements. The song tells a story of a group of women who rise up and fight the patriarchy. "Blows Up" is a "sarcastic love letter from the Earth to humans". The song "Desert" is dedicated to the next generation and is about the guilt Sóley felt leaving her daughter to "take over this inevitable war". "Sundown" is a "dark piano ballad" which details "humankind's final day on earth". The penultimate track "xxx" has a "dark and swirling soundscape that swells before fading to silence". The final track "Elegia" sees the silence "[turn] to the sound of the ocean", and the Earth "[heals] on her own" like "a woman finally free from a violent relationship".

The album cover is a photo of Sóley that was drawn over and edited by her husband Héðinn Finnsson (also known as Íbbagoggur). The cover art is meant to represent mother earth, who is "tired and angry".

The album's title is a "homage" to the films Mother! (2017) and Melancholia (2011).

== Reception ==
The Reykjavík Grapevine named Mother Melancholia as joint "Album of the Year" of 2021 with Eilífur snjór í augunum by kef LAVÍK. The magazine described the album as "a dark, deep exploration into the feeling of the end of the world, imminent death and destruction, as well as the complexity of a feminist riot surging within the heart of a woman". The magazine also felt that the album showed the "incredible depth within Sóley as a musician".

=== Awards and nominations ===
Year	Organisation	Category	Work	Result	Ref.
2021	Icelandic Music Awards	Open Class – Album	Mother Melancholia	Won	
2021	Icelandic Music Awards	Open Class – Song	"Sunrise Skulls"	Nominated	
2021	The Reykjavík Grapevine	Album of the Year	Mother Melancholia	Won	
2022	Nordic Council	Nordic Council Music Prize	Mother Melancholia	Nominated	

== Track listing ==
All tracks are written by Sóley Stefánsdóttir.

Mother Melancholia track listing
No.	Title	Length
1.	"Sunrise Skulls"	7:41
2.	"Circles"	6:21
3.	"Blows Up"	5:37
4.	"Hysteria"	1:50
5.	"Parasite"	3:23
6.	"Desert"	4:06
7.	"In Heaven"	4:13
8.	"Sundown"	3:29
9.	"xxx"	2:20
10.	"Elegia"	5:49
Total length:		44:53

Bandcamp digital hidden track / Vinyl bonus download track
No.	Title	Length
11.	"Bridges Collapse"	6:04
Total length:		50:57

CD hidden bonus tracks
No.	Title	Length
11.	"Parasite" (Extended version)	10:18
12.	"Circles" (Accordion version)	5:34
Total length:		1:00:45

== Personnel ==
Credits taken from the album's Bandcamp page and the CD booklet.

- Sóley Stefánsdóttir – Music, words, production, arrangements ("Desert", "Circles" and "Sundown")
- Íbbagoggur (Héðinn Finnsson) – Art direction, additional production, album artwork and design
- Albert Finnbogason – Additional production, final mix
- Sarah Register – Mastering
- Kristín Þóra Haraldsdóttir – String arrangement ("Sunrise Skulls"), arrangements ("Desert", "Circles" and "Sundown"), orchestrations
- Jón Óskar Jónsson – Drums
- Kristín Þóra Haraldsdóttir – String Quintet (Viola)
- Sigrún Kristbjörg Jónsdóttir – String Quintet (Violin)
- Guðbjörg Hlín Guðmundsdóttir – String Quintet (Violin)
- Alexandra Kjeld – String Quintet (Double Bass)
- Þórdís Gerður Jónsdóttir – String Quintet (Cello)
- Sunna Ben - Photography

== Mother Melancholia tour ==
Sóley embarked on a tour in support of the album in November 2021.

Date	City	Country	Venue
1 November 2021	Göteborg	Sweden	Kulturhuset Oceanen
2 November 2021	København	Denmark	Hotel Cecil
3 November 2021	Århus	Denmark	Musikhuset Aarhus
5 November 2021	Hamburg	Germany	Kulturkirche Altona
6 November 2021	Berlin	Germany	Passionskirche Kreuzberg
7 November 2021	Erlangen	Germany	E-Werk Kulturzentrum
8 November 2021	Freiburg Im Breisgau	Germany	Jazzhaus Freiburg
9 November 2021	München	Germany	Technikum
11 November 2021	Mannheim	Germany	Alte Feuerwache
12 November 2021	Amsterdam	Netherlands	Paradiso
14 November 2021	Brussels	Belgium	Le Botanique
15 November 2021	Paris	France	Point Ephemere
16 November 2021	London	United Kingdom	Colours Hoxton
18 November 2021	Brighton	United Kingdom	Patterns
19 November 2021	Bristol	United Kingdom	Beacon Foyer
20 November 2021	Leeds	United Kingdom	Belgrave Music Hall
21 November 2021	Glasgow	United Kingdom	Centre for Contemporary Arts

== Release history ==
Release date	Format	Label	ID No.	Ref.
22 October 2021	Digital download/Streaming	Sóley (Independently released)		
22 October 2021	LP ("Library Red" vinyl)	Lovitt Records	LOV94	
June 2022	CD	SMIT		
