= Scary World Theory =

Studio album by Lali Puna
- Released: 15 October 2001
- Recorded: May – June 2001
- Studios: Uphon (Weilheim in Oberbayern); Hausmusik (Munich)
- Genre: Electropop
- Length: 37:26
- Label: Morr
- Producer: Mario Thaler

Lali Puna chronology
Tridecoder (1999)	Scary World Theory (2001)	Faking the Books (2004)

Singles from Scary World Theory
- 1. "Nin-Com-Pop" Released: 15 May 2001

Professional ratings
Review scores
Source	Rating
AllMusic	4/5 stars
Now	4/5
Pitchfork	8.8/10
Stylus Magazine	6.5/10

Scary World Theory is the second studio album by German electronic music band Lali Puna. It was released on 15 October 2001 by Morr Music.

== Track listing ==
All lyrics are written by Valerie Trebeljahr, except where noted.

No.	Title	Music	Length
1.	"Nin-Com-Pop"	Trebeljahr; Markus Acher	4:37
2.	"Middle Curse"	Trebeljahr; Acher	3:36
3.	"Bi-Pet" (lyrics by Trebeljahr and Acher)	Acher	3:12
4.	"Contratempo"	Trebeljahr; Acher; Christoph Brandner; Florian Zimmer	4:25
5.	"Scary World Theory"	Trebeljahr	4:43
6.	"50 Faces Of"	Trebeljahr; Acher; Mario Thaler	3:55
7.	"Lowdown"	Trebeljahr; Acher	3:56
8.	"Don't Think"	Trebeljahr; Acher	3:57
9.	"Come On Home"	Trebeljahr; Acher; Thaler	3:35
10.	"Satur-Nine"	Acher	1:30
Total length:			37:26

== Personnel ==
Credits are adapted from the album's liner notes.

Lali Puna

- Valerie Trebeljahr
- Markus Acher
- Christoph Brandner
- Florian Zimmer

Additional musicians

- Osamu Nambu – violin

Production

- Michael Heilrath – mastering
- Mario Thaler – production, mixing, recording

Design

- Jan Kruse – cover artwork
- O8 Design – cover artwork
