= Aelita (Tied & Tickled Trio album) =

Studio album by Tied & Tickled Trio
- Released: 1 June 2007
- Recorded: 2007
- Studio: Alien Research Center (Weilheim in Oberbayern)
- Genre: Indie electronic; dub; jazz
- Length: 43:58
- Label: Morr

Tied & Tickled Trio chronology
A.R.C. (2006)	Aelita (2007)	La Place Demon (2011)

Aelita is the fifth studio album by German electronic and jazz band Tied & Tickled Trio. It was released on 1 June 2007 by Morr Music.

== Composition ==
Aelita "completed a movement that led away from [Tied & Tickled Trio's] earlier jazz-based sound and towards a more self-consciously futurist form of open-ended electronic improvisation," according to The Wire.

== Critical reception ==
Professional ratings
Review scores
Source	Rating
Pitchfork	5.2/10
PopMatters	7/10
Tiny Mix Tapes	3/5

Pitchfork's Brian Howe wrote that Aelita "is perfect for art gallery openings, dinner parties, and scoring silent sci-fi films. But beyond its utility as a backdrop, it's an awfully cold, blank, and directionless void to trawl alone." Tiny Mix Tapes writer Urban Guerilla noted that the album "fluctuates too much from moment to moment" and generally "falls a little flat." Joe Tacopino of PopMatters described it as "a concept album without any lyrics" and found that "within [the jazz] genre, which has not fully embraced the era of Pro Tools, The Tied and Tickled Trio has constructed a compelling argument to meld these two worlds together." SLUG Magazine's Andrew Glassett praised the album's overall production and percussion sounds.

== Track listing ==
All tracks are written by Markus Acher, Micha Acher, Christoph Brandner, Andreas Gerth and Carl Oesterhelt.

1. "Aelita 1" – 3:05
2. "You Said Tomorrow Yesterday" – 8:22
3. "Tamaghis" – 7:33
4. "Aelita 2" – 1:32
5. "A Rocket Debris Cloud Drifts" – 7:48
6. "Chlebnikov" – 4:15
7. "Other Voices Other Rooms" – 8:19
8. "Aelita 3" – 3:04

== Personnel ==
Credits are adapted from the album's liner notes.

Tied & Tickled Trio

- Markus Acher
- Micha Acher
- Christoph Brandner
- Andreas Gerth
- Carl Oesterhelt

Production

- Steve Rooke – mastering
- Martin Schulze – recording
- Oliver Zülch – mixing

Design

- Andreas Gerth – artwork
- Daidō Moriyama – photography
- Christopher Wool – photography
