= Krómantík =

EP by Sóley
- Released: 18 July 2014
- Recorded: 2009–2011
- Genre: Instrumental Piano
- Length: 15:38
- Label: Morr Music
- Producer: Sóley

Sóley chronology
| We Sink (2011) | Krómantík (2014) | Ask the Deep (2015) |

Krómantík is the second extended play released by Icelandic singer-songwriter Sóley in 2014 through Morr Music. The EP is composed mostly of instrumental piano pieces.

== Background ==
Krómantík was described by label Morr Music as "a short, eerie, cinematic, almost voice-less set of piano tracks [Sóley] originally composed for various art projects over a longer period of time". The songs on the EP were all recorded by Sóley in her living room in 2009 (according to the liner notes) or 2011 (according to the Morr Music press release).

Sóley explained that she had planned to do a piano album since she was at an art academy. Some pieces were written while she was studying. The first track "Stiklur" was originally part of a bigger composition for piano. Many of the songs on the EP were written for a bigger project that Sóley worked on during the summer after she finished her first album We Sink.

The EP's title is a portmanteau of the words "chromatic" and "romantic".

Physical copies of the album on CD and vinyl included an 8-page booklet with sheet music and illustrations.

"Krómantík" and "Eftirteiti" are the only tracks with vocals. "Stofuvals" is a longer, instrumental version of the song "Fight Them Soft" from We Sink.

No singles were released from the EP, but videos were produced for the tracks "Krómantík" and "Falski píanótíminn", directed by Bruno Granato and Héðinn Finnsson respectively.

== Reception ==
Professional ratings
Review scores
| Source | Rating |
|---|---|
| The Reykjavík Grapevine | Mixed |
| NBHAP | 3.5/5 stars |

In a review for The Reykjavík Grapevine, Nathan Hall compared the music on the EP to "composers known for their piano music", such as Sergei Rachmaninoff, Dmitri Shostakovich, and Sergei Prokofiev, and noted that it "evokes images of music halls past". The opening song "Stiklur" was described as "winding and chromatic", while "Krómantík" was considered "more familiar to contemporary ears", building vocals in layers. Hall felt that "Kaósmúsik" and "Efterteiti" would not have been out of place in a Tim Burton film. Even though Hall felt the piano sound was "evocative", he also felt the EP "loses its mysterious charm rather quickly without additional visuals to accompany". Hall added that the "curious and clever piano miniatures" are "done a disservice" due to being "masked by reverb", and he felt that the tracks feel "ghostly and pale" compared to Sóley's previous work which "lay in a colorful area between genres".

Emily Schennach reviewed the EP for the magazine Nothing but Hope and Passion (now known as OFFKEY). She described the songs as "cinematographic images running through your head when listening to them". While the opening song "Stiklur" was a "a heavy ballad for troubled minds", the following song "Fantasía" was "a graceful and dreamlike romance". "Stofuvals" was the "dramatic peak" of the EP and Schennach compared the song to the work of Claude Debussy. She felt Krómantík was, overall, a "beautiful album" but that it would have benefitted from being longer.

== Track listing ==
All tracks are written by Sóley Stefánsdóttir.

| No. | Title | Length |
|---|---|---|
| 1. | "Stiklur" | 2:47 |
| 2. | "Fantasía" | 2:39 |
| 3. | "Falski píanótíminn" | 1:04 |
| 4. | "Kaósmúsík" | 0:35 |
| 5. | "Krómantík" | 2:40 |
| 6. | "Stofuvals" | 2:34 |
| 7. | "Eftirteiti" | 1:47 |
| 8. | "Swing" | 1:32 |
| Total length: | | 15:38 |

== Personnel ==
All information taken from the EP's liner notes.

- Sóley – Composer, Recording, Mixing
- Helmut Erler – Mastering
- Héðinn Finnsson – Artwork

== Release history ==
| Release date | Format | Label | ID No. | Ref. |
|---|---|---|---|---|
| 18 July 2014 | CD | Morr Music | MM130CD | |
| 18 July 2014 | 10" Vinyl | Morr Music | MM130LP | |
