= Celebrating Life =

Studio album by Borko
- Released: March 2008
- Recorded: 2002–2008
- Genre: Alternative rock, indie rock
- Length: 41:25
- Label: Morr Music
- Producer: Björn Kristiansson, Gunnar Örn Tynes

Borko chronology
Celebrating Life (2008)	Born to Be Free (2012)

Professional ratings
Review scores
Source	Rating
AllMusic	4/5 stars
PopMatters	5/10 stars

Celebrating Life is the 2008 debut album by Icelandic musician Borko. It was released in March, 2008 on record labels Morr Music and Kimi Records. Participating on the album are also members from fellow Icelandic bands múm and Benni Hemm Hemm.

== Track listing ==
1. "Continental Love" – 5:39
2. "Spoonstabber" – 4:03
3. "Shoo Ba Ba" – 4:27
4. "Sushi Stakeout" – 5:02
5. "Dingdong Kingdom" – 4:41
6. "Summer Logic" – 5:19
7. "Doo Doo Doo" – 5:37
8. "Hondo & Borko" – 6:33

== Personnel ==
- Björn Kristjánsson – vocals, synthesizer, electronic organ, electronic keyboard, rhodes piano. piano, vibraphone, glockenspiel
- Helgi Svavar Helgason – drums
- Guðmundur Óskar Guðmundsson – bass guitar
- Róbert Sturla Reynisson – acoustic/electric baritone guitar. soprano guitar
- Örvar Þóreyjarson Smárason – electric guitar, harmonica
- Áki Asgeirsson – trumpet
- Eirikur Orri Olafsson – trumpet
- Númi Þorkell Thomasson – additional drums
- Davið Þór Jónsson – bass vocals on "Summer Logic"
- Friðrik Sólnes Jónsson – vocals on "Doo Doo Doo"
