= Brand New Love (disambiguation) =

"Brand New Love" is a song by Lou Barlow.

Brand New Love may also refer to:

- Brand New Love (album), a 2014 album by The Go Find
- Brand New Love, a 1990 album by Jeff & Sheri Easter
- "Brand New Love", a song by Rabbitt from Boys Will Be Boys
- "Brand New Love (Take a Chance)", a song by Giorgio Moroder and Philip Oakey from Philip Oakey & Giorgio Moroder
- "Brand New Love", a song by Serena Ryder from Serena Ryder
