= No P. or D. =

Studio album by Ms. John Soda
- Released: 7 October 2002
- Recorded: 2002
- Studio: Uphon (Weilheim in Oberbayern)
- Genres: Indie electronic; electropop
- Length: 35:58
- Label: Morr
- Producers: Mario Thaler; Ms. John Soda

Ms. John Soda chronology
No P. or D. (2002)	Notes and the Like (2006)

No P. or D. is the debut studio album by German indie electronic band Ms. John Soda. It was released on 7 October 2002 by Morr Music.

== Reception ==
Professional ratings
Review scores
Source	Rating
AllMusic	4/5 stars
Pitchfork	8.8/10 (Note: No P. or D. was the first album to ever be awarded Pitchfork's Best New Music designation, though this designation no longer appears on the review.)
Stylus Magazine	6.2/10
Tiny Mix Tapes	5/5

Pitchfork critic Eric Carr highlighted the "serene vocals" and "rich, deep melodies" present throughout No P. or D., describing the album as a "fantastically accessible" record that "can be enjoyed with as much or as little of the brain as desired." Tiny Mix Tapes reviewer Wolfman wrote that he "couldn't help but feel a deep sense of inner peace" while listening to the album. Jaime Vázquez of AllMusic cited Ms. John Soda's ability to create "mood" as their "greatest strength", adding: "They make recordings that can be left on as background, but the arrangements hold up to scrutiny and reveal new subtleties with each listen." In a less enthusiastic review, Stylus Magazine's Kareem Estefan was critical of the band's "cautious approach" and deemed the album "good, but inessential." At the end of 2003, No P. or D. was listed by Pitchfork as the year's 45th best album.

== Track listing ==
All tracks are written by Micha Acher and Stefanie Böhm.

No.	Title	Length
1.	"Technicolor"	4:17
2.	"Misco"	4:17
3.	"Go Check"	4:15
4.	"Solid Ground"	3:26
5.	"By Twos"	5:49
6.	"Unsleeping"	4:07
7.	"Hiding / Fading"	4:56
8.	"Elusive"	4:51
Total length:		35:58

== Personnel ==
Credits are adapted from the album's liner notes.

Ms. John Soda

- Micha Acher
- Stefanie Böhm

Additional musicians

- Thomas Geltinger – drums
- Gerhard Gschlößl – trombone
- Carl Oesterhelt – percussion
- Ulrich Wangenheim – flute

Production

- Michael Heilrath – mastering
- Ms. John Soda – production
- Mario Thaler – production

Design

- Jan Kruse – cover and booklet artwork
- Gerald von Foris – photography
