= Born to Be Free =

Born to Be Free may refer to:

- Born to Be Free (Sonique album), 2003
- Born to Be Free (Borko album), 2012
- "Born to Be Free" (X Japan song), 2015
