= Innrásin =

Icelandic program to promote music touring

In the spring of 2008 the independent Icelandic Kraumur Music Fund launched a special program called Innrásin, to support Icelandic artists to tour Iceland.

Most Icelandic bands and artists are located in and around Iceland's capital, Reykjavík. The aim of 'Innrásin' is to support them to tour other places of the country to develop their career, increase their fan-base and promote their records. Among artists featured on 'Innrásar-tours' so far have been; Sign, Reykjavík!, Bloodgroup, Njútón, Elfa Rún Kristindóttir, Melkorka Ólafsdóttir, Benni Hemm Hemm and Borko.

== Touring ==
Innrásin has supported tours and shows which have reached all corners of the country and taken place towns like Akureyri, Egilsstaðir, Ísafjörður, Keflavík, Seyðisfjörður, Selfoss, Vestmannaeyjar, Höfn í Hornafirði and Stokkseyri.
