= Miami (The Go Find album) =

Studio album by The Go Find
- Released: September 21, 2004
- Recorded: 2004
- Genre: Electronic, Indie Pop
- Label: Morr

The Go Find chronology
Miami (2004)	Stars on the Wall (2007)

Singles from Miami
- 1. "Over the Edge/What I Want" Released: October 18, 2004; 2. "Summer Quest" Released: 2004

Professional ratings
Review scores
Source	Rating
Allmusic	link

Miami is the first album from Belgian solo act The Go Find, released in 2004 by Morr Music.

== Track listing ==
1. "Over the Edge" – 4:18
2. "Summer Quest" – 5:00
3. "City Dreamer" – 2:54
4. "What I Want" – 3:46
5. "Sky Window" – 4:12
6. "Bleeding Heart" – 3:54
7. "Modern Times" – 2:58
8. "The Party" – 2:12
9. "Igloo" – 3:36
10. "Blisters on My Thumb" – 3:52
