= Tridecoder =

Studio album by Lali Puna
- Released: 1 September 1999
- Recorded: June – July 1999
- Studio: Echokammer (Munich)
- Genre: Electropop
- Length: 37:28
- Labels: Darla; Hausmusik; Morr

Lali Puna chronology
Tridecoder (1999)	Scary World Theory (2001)

Professional ratings
Review scores
Source	Rating
AllMusic	4/5 stars

Tridecoder is the debut studio album by German electronic music band Lali Puna. It was released on 1 September 1999 by Darla Records, Hausmusik and Morr Music.

== Track listing ==
All lyrics are written by Valerie Trebeljahr.

No.	Title	Music	Length
1.	"6-0-3"	Trebeljahr	5:09
2.	"Rapariga da Banheira"	Trebeljahr; Markus Acher	3:57
3.	"Antena Trash"	Trebeljahr; Acher	4:34
4.	"System On"	Trebeljahr	3:35
5.	"Everywhere & Allover"	Trebeljahr	4:44
6.	"Toca-Discos"	Trebeljahr	4:39
7.	"Press My Tummy"	Trebeljahr; Acher	2:30
8.	"Fast Forward"	Trebeljahr; Acher	3:56
9.	"Superlotado"	Acher	4:24
Total length:			37:28

== Personnel ==
Credits are adapted from the album's liner notes.

Lali Puna

- Valerie Trebeljahr – vocals, keyboards, sampler
- Markus Acher – bass, keyboards, sampler
- Christoph Brandner – drums, electronic drums, sampler
- Florian Zimmer – keyboards, sampler

Production

- Rashad Becker – mastering
- Albert Pöschl – mixing, recording
- Mario Thaler – mixing

Design

- Jan Kruse – cover artwork
