= Observing Systems =

Studio album by Tied & Tickled Trio
- Released: 8 September 2003
- Recorded: 18–22 August 2002
- Studio: Uphon (Weilheim in Oberbayern)
- Genre: Electronic; jazz
- Length: 56:12
- Label: Morr
- Producer: Markus Acher; Andreas Gerth; Mario Thaler

Tied & Tickled Trio chronology
Electric Avenue Tapes (2001)	Observing Systems (2003)	A.R.C. (2006)

Professional ratings
Review scores
Source	Rating
Pitchfork	8.3/10
Tiny Mix Tapes	3/5

Observing Systems is the fourth studio album by German electronic and jazz band Tied & Tickled Trio. It was released on 8 September 2003 by Morr Music.

== Track listing ==
No.	Title	Writer(s)	Length
1.	"The Long Tomorrow"	Micha Acher	7:02
2.	"Radio Sun 1"	Andreas Gerth	0:36
3.	"Revolution"	Gerth; Leroy Sibbles	4:13
4.	"Radio Sun 2"	Gerth	1:39
5.	"Freakmachine"	Micha Acher	6:32
6.	"Observing Systems"	Markus Acher; Gerth	1:54
7.	"3.4.E"	Micha Acher	6:18
8.	"Radio Jovian"	Markus Acher; Micha Acher; Gerth	3:28
9.	"Like Armstrong + Laika"	Gerth	4:06
10.	"Bungalow"	Johannes Enders	5:41
11.	"Radio Sun 3"	Gerth	1:03
12.	"Memory Dub"	Enders; Roberto Di Gioia	2:42
13.	"Motorik"	Markus Acher; Gerth	6:26
14.	"Ship Monk"	Markus Acher	1:59
15.	"Henry + the Ghosts"	Micha Acher	2:33
Total length:			56:12

== Personnel ==
Credits are adapted from the album's liner notes.

Tied & Tickled Trio

- Markus Acher – drums, percussion, sampler, turntables
- Micha Acher – electric bass, trumpet, piano, organ, conducting
- Johannes Enders – tenor saxophone, flute, piano
- Andreas Gerth – electronics, processing
- Ulrich Wangenheim – bass clarinet, flute

Additional musicians

- Roberto Di Gioia – piano, organ
- Leo Gmelch – tuba, bass trombone
- Gerhard Gschlößl – trombone
- Robert Klinger – double bass
- Carl Oesterhelt – percussion
- Saam Schlamminger – zarb
- Stefan Schreiber – tenor saxophone, clarinet

Production

- Markus Acher – production, mixing
- Andreas Gerth – production, mixing
- Michael Heilrath – mastering
- Martin Schulze – recording (assistant)
- Mario Thaler – production, mixing, recording

Design

- Jan Kruse – cover artwork
- Gerald von Foris – photography
