= Kraumur Awards =

Icelandic music awards

- Awarded for: Best Icelandic Albums
- Country: Iceland
- Presented by: Kraumur Music Fund
- First award: 2008
- Final award: 2016
- Website: http://www.kraumur.is/

Kraumur Awards is a music prize, organized by the Kraumur Music Fund, awarded for the best albums being released in Iceland.

The nominations for the first Kraumur Awards were announced in November 2008. Nominations and the award-winning albums are chosen by a selected panel of Icelandic music journalist and radio show hosts, with years of experience in playing and writing about Icelandic music.

The Kraumur Award usually goes to six albums, while 20 albums are nominated. The panel can add albums to the award category, which led to six albums in the first year and seven albums receiving the Kraumur award in 2013.

The Kraumur Awards an annual event with six best albums presented in alphabetical order.

== Kraumur Awards 2008 ==
The 2008 Kraumur Awards went to:

- Agent Fresco for Lightbulb Universe
- FM Belfast for How to Make Friends
- Hugi Guðmundsson for Apocrypha
- Ísafold for All Sounds to Silence Come
- Mammút for Karkari
- Retro Stefson for Montaña

Nominations (20 albums):

- Agent Fresco - Lightbulb Universe
- Celestine - At the Borders of Arcadia
- Dísa - Dísa
- Dr. Spock - Falcon Christ
- Emilíana Torrini - Me and Armini
- FM Belfast - How to Make Friends
- Hugi Guðmundsson - Apocrypha
- Introbeats - Tívólí chillout
- Ísafold - All Sounds to Silence Come
- Klive - Sweaty Psalms
- Lay Low - Farewell Good Night’s Sleep
- Mammút - Karkari
- Morðingjarnir - Áfram Ísland
- Múgsefjun - Skiptar skoðanir
- Ólafur Arnalds - Variations of Static
- Retro Stefson - Montaña
- Reykjavík! - The Blood
- Sigur Rós - Með suð í eyrum við spilum endalaust
- Sin Fang Bous - Clangour
- Skakkamanage - All Over the Face

== Kraumur Awards 2009 ==
The 2009 Kraumur Awards went to:

- Anna Guðný Guðmundsdóttir for Vingt regards sur l’enfant-Jésus
- Bloodgroup for Dry Land
- Helgi Hrafn Jónsson for For the Rest of my Childhood
- Hildur Guðnadóttir for Without Sinking
- Hjaltalin for Terminal
- Morðingjarnir for Flóttinn mikli

Nominations (20 albums):

- Anna Guðný Guðmundsdóttir - Vingt regards sur l’enfant-Jésus
- Árni Heiðar Karlsson - Mæri
- Bloodgroup - Dry Land
- Bróðir Svartúlfs - Bróðir Svartúlfs EP
- Dikta - Get it together
- Egill Sæbjörnsson - Egill S
- Feldberg - Don’t Be A Stranger
- Helga Rós Indriðadóttir og Guðrún Dalía - Jórunn Viðar, Sönglög
- Helgi Hrafn Jónsson - For the Rest of my Childhood
- Hildur Guðnadóttir - Without Sinking
- Hjaltalin - Terminal
- Kimono - Easy Music for Difficult People
- Lights on the highway - Amanita Muscaria
- Morðingjarnir - Flóttinn mikli
- múm - Singa Along to Songs that You Don’t Know
- Pascal Pinon - Pascal Pinon
- Ruxpin - Where Do We Float From Here
- Sudden Weather Change - Stop! Handgrenade In The Name Of Crib Death’understand?
- The Deathmetal Supersquad - Dead Zeppelin
- Víkingur Heiðar - Debut

== Kraumur Awards 2010 ==
The 2010 Kraumur Awards went to:

- Apparat Organ Quartet - Pólyfónía
- Daníel Bjarnason - Processions
- Ég - Lúxus upplifun
- Jónas Sigurðsson - Allt er eitthvað
- Nolo - No-Lo-Fi
- Ólöf Arnalds - Innundir skinni

Nominations (20 albums):

- Agent Fresco - A Long Time Listening
- Amiina - Puzzle
- Apparat Organ Quartet - Pólyfónía
- Daníel Bjarnason - Processions
- Ég - Lúxus upplifun
- Jónas Sigurðsson - Allt er eitthvað
- Kammerkór Suðurlands - Iepo Oneipo
- Miri - Okkar
- Momentum - Fixation, At Rest
- Moses Hightower - Búum til börn
- Nolo - No-Lo-Fi
- Ólöf Arnalds - Innundir skinni
- Prinspóló - Jukk
- Retro Stefson - Kimbabwe
- Samúel Jón Samúelsson Big Band - Helvítis Fokking Funk
- Seabear - We Built a Fire
- Sóley - Theater Island
- Stafrænn Hákon - Sanitas
- Valdimar - Undraland
- Quadruplos - Quadroplos

== Kraumur Awards 2011 ==
The 2011 Kraumur Awards went to:

- ADHD - ADHD2
- Lay Low - Brostinn Strengur
- Reykjavík! - Locust Sounds
- Samaris - Hljóma Þú (ep)
- Sin Fang - Summer Echoes
- Sóley - We Sink

Nominations (20 albums):

- ADHD - ADHD2
- Anna Þorvalds - Rhízoma
- Ben Frost og Daníel Bjarnason - SÓLARIS
- Dead Skeletons - Dead Magick
- FM Belfast - Don’t want to sleep
- For a Minor Reflection - EP
- Helgi Hrafn Jónsson - Big Spring
- Hljómsveitin Ég - Ímynd Fíflsins
- Lay Low - Brostinn Strengur
- Nolo - Nology
- Of Monsters and Men - My Head is an Animal
- Ofvitarnir - Stephen Hawking/Steven Tyler
- Ragga Gröndal - Astrocat Lullaby
- Reykjavík! - Locust Sounds
- Samaris - Hljóma Þú (ep)
- Sin Fang - Summer Echoes
- Skurken - Gilsbakki
- Snorri Helga - Winter Sun
- Sóley - We Sink
- Sólstafir - Svartir Sandar

== Kraumur Awards 2012 ==
The 2012 Kraumur Awards went to:

- Ásgeir Trausti - Dýrð í dauðaþögn
- Hjaltalín - Enter 4
- Moses Hightower - Önnur Mósebók
- Ojba Rasta - Ojba Rasta
- Pétur Ben - God’s Lonely Man
- Retro Stefson – Retro Stefson

Nominations (20 albums):

- adhd - adhd4
- Ásgeir Trausti - Dýrð í dauðaþögn
- Borko - Born To Be Free
- Davíð Þór Jónsson - Improvised Piano Works 1
- Duo Harpverk - Greenhouse Sessions
- Futuregrapher - LP
- Ghostigital - Division of Culture & Tourism
- Hilmar Örn Hilmarsson & Steindór Andersen - Stafnbúi
- Hjaltalín - Enter 4
- Moses Hightower - Önnur Mósebók
- Muck - Slaves
- Nóra - Himinbrim
- Ojba Rasta - Ojba Rasta
- Pascal Pinon - Twosomeness
- Pétur Ben - God's Lonely Man
- Retro Stefson – Retro Stefson
- Sin Fang - Half Dreams EP
- The Heavy Experience - Slowscope
- Tilbury - Exorcise
- Þórir Georg - I Will Die and You Will Die and it Will be Alright

== Kraumur Awards 2013 ==
The 2013 Kraumur Awards went to:

- Cell7 – Cellf
- Dj. flugvél og geimskip - Glamúr í geimnum
- Grísalappalísa - Ali
- Gunnar Andreas Kristinsson – Patterns
- Just Another Snake Cult - Cupid Makes A Fool of Me
- Mammút - Komdu til mín svarta systir
- Sin Fang - Flowers

Nominations (20 albums):

- Benni Hemm Hemm - Eliminate Evil, Revive Good Times
- Cell7 – Cellf
- Daníel Bjarnason - Over Light Earth
- Dj. flugvél og geimskip - Glamúr í geimnum
- Futuregrapher, Gallery Six & Veronique – Crystal Lagoon (EP)
- Grísalappalísa - Ali
- Gunnar Andreas Kristinsson - Patterns
- Jóhann Kristinsson - Headphones
- Just Another Snake Cult - Cupid Makes A Fool of Me
- Lay Low - Talking About The Weather
- Mammút - Komdu til mín svarta systir
- Múm - Smilewound
- Per:Segulsvið - Tónlist fyrir Hana
- Ruxpin - This Time We Go Together
- Samúel J. Samúelsson Big Band - 4 hliðar
- Sin Fang - Flowers
- Strigaskór nr. 42 - Armadillo
- Tilbury - Northern Comfort
- Úlfur - White Mountain
- Þórir Georg - Ælulykt

== The panel ==
The panel selecting the Kraumur Awards nominees and award albums for the years 2008-2010:

- Árni Matthíasson - head of panel, journalist with Morgunblaðið
- Alexandra Kjeld - journalist with Rjominn.is/Morgunblaðið
- Andrea Jónsdóttir - radio show host at Iceland National Radio 2
- Arnar Eggert Thoroddsen - journalist with Morgunblaðið
- Halldór Laxness (Dóri DNA) - journalist with DV
- Hildur Maral Hamíðsdóttir - journalist with Rjominn.is
- Ólafur Páll Gunnarsson - radio show host at Iceland National Radio 2
- Trausti Júlíusson - journalist with Fréttablaðið
- Þorkell Máni Pétursson - radio show host at Radio X
- Ragnheiður Eiríksdóttir - journalist with Fréttablaðið
- Arndís Björk Ásgeirsdóttir - radio show host at Iceland National Radio 1
- Halla Steinunn Stefánsdóttir - radio show host at Iceland National Radio 1
- Matthías Már Magnússon - radio show host at Iceland National Radio 2

In the panel for 2008 Kraumur Awards only

- Sigvaldi Kaldalóns - radio show host at radio FM 957
- Sveinn Birkir Björnsson journalist with The Reykjavík Grapevine

In the panel for 2009 Kraumur Awards only

- Haukur S. Magnússon - editor of The Reykjavík Grapevine
- Skarphéðinn Guðmundsson - 365 media
- Benedikt Reynisson - Benson is Fantastic music blog

In the panel for 2011 Kraumur Awards:

- Alexandra Kjeld - music journalist
- Andrea Jónsdóttir - radio show host at Iceland National Radio 2
- Anna Andersen - editor of The Reykjavík Grapevine
- Arnar Eggert Thoroddsen - journalist with Morgunblaðið
- Arndís Björk Ásgeirsdóttir - radio show host at Iceland National Radio 1
- Árni Matthíasson - head of panel, journalist with Morgunblaðið
- Benedikt Reynisson - Benson is Fantastic music blog
- Berglind María Tómasdóttir - radio show host at Iceland National Radio 1
- Egill Harðarson - web designer / editor of Rjominn.is
- Eldar Ástþórsson - marketing at CCP Games
- Elísabet Indra Ragnarsdóttir - radio show host at Iceland National Radio 1
- Helena Þrastardóttir - librarian / music lover
- Helga Vala Helgadóttir - lawyer at Valva / music lover
- Hildur Maral Hamíðsdóttir - journalist with Rjominn.is / PR and management
- Höskuldur Daði Magnússon - journalist with Fréttablaðið
- Kamilla Ingibergsdóttir - pr and marketing at Iceland Airwaves Music Festival
- Ólafur Páll Gunnarsson - program manager and host at Iceland National Radio 2
- Ómar Eyþórsson - radio show host at Radio X-ið 977
- Trausti Júlíusson - journalist with Fréttablaðið
- Þorkell Máni Pétursson - radio show host at Radio X-ið 977

In the panel for 2012 Kraumur Awards:

- Alexandra Kjeld - music journalist
- Andrea Jónsdóttir - radio show host at Iceland National Radio 2
- Anna Andersen - editor of The Reykjavík Grapevine
- Arnar Eggert Thoroddsen - journalist with Morgunblaðið and independent music writer
- Arndís Björk Ásgeirsdóttir - radio show host at Iceland National Radio 1
- Árni Matthíasson - head of panel, journalist with Morgunblaðið
- Ása Dýradóttir - musician / Mammút
- Benedikt Reynisson - Benson is Fantastic music blog and music journalist for Kjarninn
- Egill Harðarson - web designer / editor of Rjominn.is
- Elísabet Indra Ragnarsdóttir - radio show host at Iceland National Radio 1
- Guðni Tómasson- music lover, historian and chairman of the board of directors, The Iceland Symphony Orchestra
- Haukur S. Magnússon - philosopher, musician and editor for The Reykjavík Grapevine
- Helena Þrastardóttir, Helga Vala Helgadóttir
- Hildur Maral Hamíðsdóttir - journalist with [Rjo]minn.is / PR and management [Projecta]
- Höskuldur Daði Magnússon - journalist/editor with Fréttatíminn
- Kamilla Ingibergsdóttir - pr and marketing at Iceland Airwaves Music Festival
- Ólafur Halldór Ólafsson Óli Dóri)- radio show host at Radio X-ið 977 and music blogger for [Straum.is]
- Ólafur Páll Gunnarsson - program manager and host at Iceland National Radio 2
- Sólrún Sumarliðadóttir - musician / amiina
- Trausti Júlíusson - enthusiastic music specialist and journalist

In the panel for 2013 Kraumur Awards:

- Andrea Jónsdóttir - radio show host at Iceland National Radio 2
- Anna Andersen - editor of The Reykjavík Grapevine
- Arnar Eggert Thoroddsen - journalist with Morgunblaðið and independent music writer
- Árni Matthíasson - head of panel, journalist with Morgunblaðið
- Benedikt Reynisson - Benson is Fantastic music blog and music journalist for Kjarninn
- Bob Cluness - reporter for The Reykjavík Grapevine and music blogger
- Egill Harðarson - web designer / editor of Rjominn.is
- Elísabet Indra Ragnarsdóttir - radio show host at Iceland National Radio 1
- Guðni Tómasson - music lover, historian and chairman of the board of directors, The Iceland Symphony Orchestra
- Haukur Viðar Alfreðsson - journalist for Fréttablaðið and punk-rocker, Morðingjarnir
- Helena Þrastardóttir - librarian / music lover
- Helga Vala Helgadóttir - lawyer at Valva / music lover
- Helga Þórey Jónsdóttir - enthusiastic music lover and film buff
- Höskuldur Daði Magnússon - journalist/editor with Fréttatíminn
- María Lilja Þrastardóttir - reporter
- Ólafur Halldór Ólafsson (Óli Dóri)- radio show host at Radio X-ið 977 and music blogger for [Straum.is]
- Ragnheiður Eiríksdóttir - musician Hellvar, philosopher and radio host at Rás 2
- Trausti Júlíusson - enthusiastic music specialist and journalist
- Valdís Thor - photographer and music lover
- Þórunn Edda Magnúsdóttir - shop manager for 12 Tónar Harpa
