= Notes and the Like =

Studio album by Ms. John Soda
- Released: 3 March 2006
- Recorded: 2005
- Studio: Uphon (Weilheim in Oberbayern)
- Genre: Indie electronic; electropop
- Length: 39:37
- Label: Morr

Ms. John Soda chronology
No P. or D. (2002)	Notes and the Like (2006)	Loom (2015)

Notes and the Like is the second studio album by German indie electronic band Ms. John Soda. It was released on 3 March 2006 by Morr Music.

== Reception ==
Professional ratings
Aggregate scores
Source	Rating
Metacritic	66/100
Review scores
Source	Rating
AllMusic	4/5 stars
Pitchfork	5.4/10
PopMatters	6/10

At Metacritic, which assigns a weighted average score out of 100 to reviews from mainstream critics, Notes and the Like received an average score of 66 based on seven reviews, indicating "generally favorable reviews".

== Track listing ==
All lyrics are written by Stefanie Böhm; all music is composed by Micha Acher and Böhm

No.	Title	Length
1.	"A Nod on Hold"	2:44
2.	"Hands"	4:16
3.	"Scan the Ways"	3:23
4.	"A Million Times"	4:11
5.	"No. One"	5:00
6.	"Outlined View"	4:27
7.	"Line by Line"	5:52
8.	"Sometimes Stop Sometimes Go"	5:52
9.	"Plenty Of"	3:52
Total length:		39:37

== Personnel ==
Credits are adapted from the album's liner notes.

Ms. John Soda

- Micha Acher
- Stefanie Böhm

Additional musicians

- Thomas Geltinger
- Elias Giggenbach
- Johanna Giggenbach
- Carl Oesterhelt
- Andreas Gerth – additional programming
- Aqua Luminus III – Akai MPC
- Mathis Mayr – cello
- Wolfgang Schönwetter – horns
- Stefan Schreiber – flute, saxophone
- Tobi Weber – viola

Production

- Michael Heilrath – mixing
- Ms. John Soda – mixing
- Mario Thaler – additional recording
- Nick Webb – mastering

Design

- Jan Kruse – artwork
- Gerald von Foris – photography
