= Our Inventions =

Studio album by Lali Puna
- Released: 1 April 2010
- Recorded: December 2008 – October 2009
- Studio: Portmanteau (Munich); Alien Research Center (Weilheim in Oberbayern)
- Genre: Electropop
- Length: 37:23
- Label: Morr

Lali Puna chronology
Faking the Books (2004)	Our Inventions (2010)	Two Windows (2017)

Singles from Our Inventions
- 1. "Remember" Released: 19 March 2010; 2. "Move On" Released: 3 June 2011

Professional ratings
Aggregate scores
Source	Rating
AnyDecentMusic?	6.3/10
Metacritic	72/100
Review scores
Source	Rating
AllMusic	3.5/5 stars
The A.V. Club	A−
Pitchfork	6.5/10
Q	4/5 stars
Spin	6/10
Uncut	3/5 stars
XLR8R	6.5/10

Our Inventions is the fourth studio album by German electronic music band Lali Puna. It was released on 1 April 2010 by Morr Music.

== Track listing ==
All lyrics are written by Valerie Trebeljahr, except where noted

No.	Title	Music	Length
1.	"Rest Your Head"	Trebeljahr; Markus Acher; Christian Heiß	3:10
2.	"Remember" (lyrics by Trebeljahr and Acher)	Trebeljahr; Acher; Heiß	3:43
3.	"Everything Is Always"	Trebeljahr; Acher; Heiß	4:18
4.	"Our Inventions"	Trebeljahr	4:19
5.	"Move On"	Trebeljahr; Acher; Heiß	3:40
6.	"Safe Tomorrow"	Trebeljahr; Acher; Heiß	4:28
7.	"Future Tense"	Acher; Heiß	3:47
8.	"Hostile to Me"	Trebeljahr; Acher; Heiß	2:19
9.	"That Day"	Trebeljahr; Acher; Heiß	3:34
10.	"Out There" (featuring Yukihiro Takahashi)	Trebeljahr; Takahashi	4:05
Total length:			37:23

== Personnel ==
Credits are adapted from the album's liner notes.

Lali Puna

- Valerie Trebeljahr
- Markus Acher
- Christoph Brandner
- Christian Heiß

Additional musicians

- Karl Ivar Refseth – percussion, vibraphone
- Yukihiro Takahashi – performance on "Out There"

Production

- Tomohiko Gondo – additional production on "Out There"
- Christian Heiß – recording
- Sean Magee – mastering
- Yukihiro Takahashi – additional production on "Out There"
- Oliver Zülch – mixing, additional production and recording

Design

- Julia Guther – artwork
- Verena Spring – costume design (paper dress)
- Gerald von Foris – photography
