= Harmóník I & II =

Compilation album by Sóley
- Released: 13 November 2020
- Recorded: 2015–2018
- Genres: Accordion; drone music
- Length: 24:18
- Label: SMIT
- Producer: Sóley

Sóley chronology
Harmóník II (2020)	Harmóník I & II (2020)	Mother Melancholia (2021)

Harmóník I & II is a compilation album released by Icelandic singer-songwriter Sóley on 13 November 2020. It includes material from the instrumental extended plays Harmóník and Harmóník II released in 2017 and 2020 respectively.

== Background ==
=== Original releases (2017–2020) ===
Sóley released a digital extended play titled Harmóník on 4 September 2017 containing 4 untitled tracks. She later released the EP on 7-inch vinyl through SMIT records, an independent label run by Sóley and her husband Héðinn Finnsson. A follow-up EP titled Harmóník II was released digitally on 20 October 2020, containing 3 songs. This was also released on 7-inch vinyl by SMIT records. The two EPs where combined into one release Harmóník I & II, released digitally on 13 November 2020 and physically on 10-inch vinyl the following month. While the physical release contained a total of seven tracks, digital and streaming releases have an additional eighth song titled "Never Change" which did not appear on the earlier two releases.

Sóley planned to make Harmóník I & II the second of a trilogy of 10-inch vinyl releases, with 2014's Krómantík as the first, and a planned third entry titled Organík which will include lo-fi organ pieces.

=== Recording ===
The Harmóník series began in 2015 when Sóley played at the concert hall Harpa as part of a concert series called Blikktromman, and afterwards wished to push her music in new directions. She became interested in composing music on the accordion, which she saw as "an extension of the lungs" because it "breaths so heavily". She also felt the accordion had a diverse sound – "it has these beautiful and eerie wood sounds like flute and clarinet, but it can also sound like deep strings and the best part is when it sounds like an insane out-of-tune organ". The first track "2:05" – the untitled opening song of the first Harmóník EP – was the first track composed for the project. According to the liner notes of the physical vinyl release, the tracks of the first EP were recorded in the fall of 2015 and 2016. "Improvisations" from the second EP was recorded live on a loop pedal in Sóley's studio in January 2017. Another track from the second EP, "She Felt Like Greiving Him", was described by Sóley as a "short and kinda ghostly tribute to waltz music". The liner notes for the physical release of the second EP stated the tracks were recorded in the fall of 2018.

When comparing the two EPs, Sóley described the first EP as "much closer to your ears" and "very deep and drone-y" while the second EP was completely recorded live.

=== Promotion ===
No singles were released from the compilation, but a music video was produced for "Never Change", directed by Derrick Belcham.

Sóley performed a concert at the Harpa concert hall on 7th March 2022 as part of the Dark Music Days festival, where she performed material from Harmóník I & II.

== Reception ==
The website Scandinavia Standard noted the compilation was "framed through classical movements" and contained "stunning choral harmonies" on some tracks.

== Track listing ==
All tracks are written by Sóley Stefánsdóttir.

Harmóník I & II
No.	Title	Length
1.	"2:05"	2:05
2.	"3:40"	3:40
3.	"2:55"	2:55
4.	"2:25"	2:25
5.	"Solitary"	3:43
6.	"She Felt Like Grieving Him"	1:48
7.	"Improvisations"	4:02
Total length:		20:38

Digital/Streaming bonus track
No.	Title	Length
8.	"Never Change"	3:40
Total length:		24:18

== Personnel ==
Credits taken from the Bandcamp page:

- Sóley Stefánsdóttir – Composition, Recording, Mixing
- Albert Finnbogason – Mastering
- Íbbagoggur (Héðinn Finnsson) – Album artwork

== Release history ==
Release date	Release	Format	Label	ID No.	Ref.
4 September 2017	Harmóník (EP)	Digital download	SMIT		
2017	Harmóník (EP)	7-inch vinyl	SMIT	SMIT003	
20 October 2020	Harmóník II (EP)	Digital download	SMIT		
20 October 2020	Harmóník II (EP)	7-inch vinyl	SMIT	SMIT#14	
13 November 2020	Harmóník I & II	Digital download/Streaming	SMIT		
December 2020	Harmóník I & II	10-inch Vinyl	SMIT	SMIT10EP03	
