= Faking the Books =

Studio album by Lali Puna
- Released: 5 April 2004
- Recorded: June – November 2003
- Studios: Uphon (Weilheim in Oberbayern); Hausmusik (Munich)
- Genres: Indie electronic; electropop
- Length: 38:30
- Label: Morr
- Producer: Mario Thaler

Lali Puna chronology
Scary World Theory (2001)	Faking the Books (2004)	Our Inventions (2010)

Singles from Faking the Books
- 1. "Left Handed" Released: 2 June 2003; 2. "Micronomic" Released: 13 July 2004

Faking the Books is the third studio album by German electronic music band Lali Puna. It was released on 5 April 2004 by Morr Music.

Faking the Books peaked at number 23 on Billboard's Top Dance/Electronic Albums chart.

== Critical reception ==
Professional ratings
Aggregate scores
Source	Rating
Metacritic	83/100
Review scores
Source	Rating
AllMusic	3.5/5 stars
Alternative Press	5/5 stars
Pitchfork	7.5/10
Playlouder	4.5/5 stars
Q	4/5 stars
Spin	B+
Stylus	7/10
Tiny Mix Tapes	3/5 stars
Uncut	4/5 stars
URB	4.5/5 stars

At Metacritic, which assigns a weighted average score out of 100 to reviews from mainstream critics, Faking the Books received an average score of 83 based on 18 reviews, indicating "universal acclaim".

Faking the Books was ranked at number five on Exclaim!'s "Electronic – Year in Review 2004" list.

== Track listing ==
All lyrics are written by Valerie Trebeljahr, except where noted.

No.	Title	Music	Length
1.	"Faking the Books" (lyrics by Trebeljahr and Markus Acher)	Acher	4:00
2.	"Call 1-800-Fear"	Trebeljahr; Acher	3:24
3.	"Micronomic"	Trebeljahr	3:23
4.	"Small Things"	Trebeljahr	3:40
5.	"B-Movie"	Trebeljahr	3:13
6.	"People I Know"	Acher	3:05
7.	"Grin and Bear"	Trebeljahr; Acher	4:41
8.	"Geography-5"	Trebeljahr	2:27
9.	"Left Handed"	Trebeljahr; Acher; Max Punktezahl	3:44
10.	"Alienation"	Trebeljahr; Acher	4:01
11.	"Crawling by Numbers"	Trebeljahr	2:52
Total length:			38:30

== Personnel ==
Credits are adapted from the album's liner notes.

Lali Puna

- Valerie Trebeljahr
- Markus Acher
- Christoph Brandner
- Christian Heiß

Additional musicians

- Sebastian Hess – cello on "Crawling by Numbers"
- Osamu Nambu – violin on "Alienation"
- Max Punktezahl – guitar on "Left Handed"

Production

- Chris Blair – mastering
- Mario Thaler – production, mixing, recording

Design

- Jan Kruse – cover artwork
- John-Patrick Morarescu – photography

== Charts ==
Chart (2004)	Peak position
Belgian Albums (Ultratop Flanders)	82
Belgian Alternative Albums (Ultratop Flanders)	42
US Top Dance/Electronic Albums (Billboard)	23
