= Sóley =

Icelandic musician (born 1987)

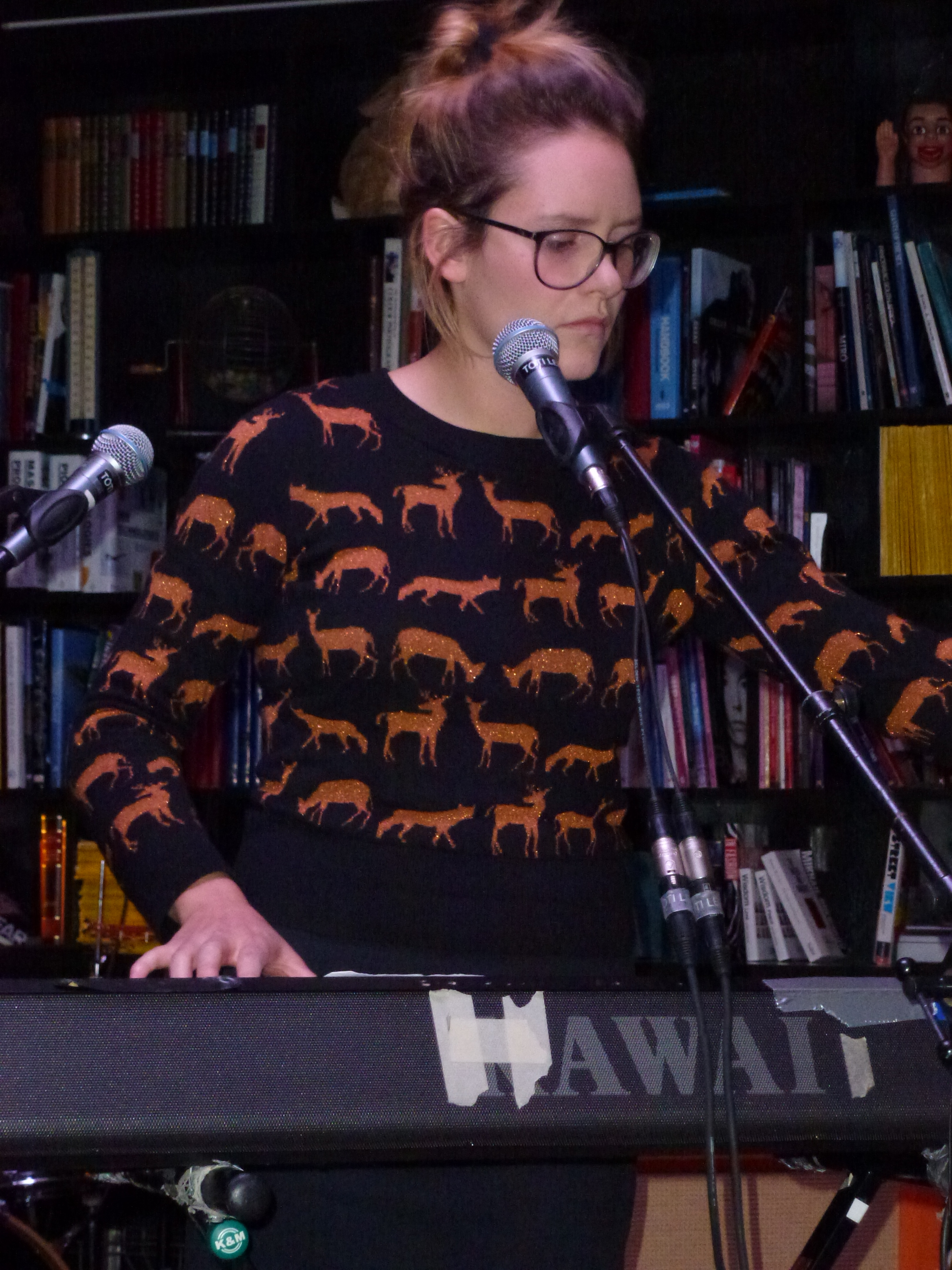
- Sóley performing in Reykjavík

Background information
- Born: Sóley Stefánsdóttir; 20 October 1987 (age 38); Hafnarfjörður, Iceland
- Genres: Indie folk; indie pop
- Instruments: Vocals; guitar; keyboard; percussions
- Years active: 2006–present
- Label: Morr Music
- Website: soley-music.com

Sóley Stefánsdóttir (born 20 October 1987), better known simply as Sóley, is an Icelandic multi-instrumentalist, singer, and songwriter.

== Career ==
Sóley studied classical and jazz style piano as a child and later went to the Icelandic Art Academy to study composition to become a proficient pianist and guitarist. Although hailing from Iceland, she sings primarily in English both in her solo and group work. She became part of the seven-piece Icelandic indie-folk band, Seabear, in 2006. Signed to the record label, Morr Music, the band have so far released two albums and an EP, on which Sóley predominantly provides piano and backing vocals.

Under the same label, Sóley released her first solo EP in 2010, titled Theater Island. The following year, she went on to release We Sink, her first full-length album. Critical response was largely positive, with praise often aimed at the "delightful and beautiful" piano play and the delicate vocal delivery. The songwriting was also celebrated for its "dream-like" quality and "dark surrealism". Sóley herself described her lyrics as "Dreamy, surrealistic and in their own world", expressing her hope that listeners will decipher their own meaning from the words. In 2013, a track from the album, Fight Them Soft, was used in the soundtrack to an episode of the E4 comedy-drama Misfits.

A piano album composed and performed entirely by Sóley, entitled Krómantík, was released on 18 July 2014 along with sheet music and illustrations to accompany each of the pieces. About the album, Sóley elaborated, "I always wanted to do a piano album, ever since I was in the art academy," she explains. "Some of the pieces on Krómantík were written while studying – and the first track ‘Stiklur’, for example, was originally part of a bigger composition for piano that I wrote. However, in the end I didn't use that many pieces from school, just because I liked doing new songs, and so a lot of them were written for a bigger art project I worked on during the summer after I finished We Sink." She further described the mood of the album, stating, "In the night or when it’s cold and rainy outside, sit in a chair in your living room and listen. If you feel like it, move a little. Imagine a little out-of-tune piano in one corner, then imagine old hands. Those old hands have a story to tell. Those hands are almost unreal but it’s hard to tell only by listening. Those hands will play until Krómantík fades into silence and your closed eyes slowly start seeing something much deeper and darker."

Her second LP, Ask the Deep, was released on 8 May 2015. To promote the new material, she made appearances at various festivals, including ATP Iceland, Rauðasandur Festival and Iceland Airwaves in 2014. Sóley then embarked on another extensive European tour and released a new EP, Don't Ever Listen. The 5 tracks were initially recorded as early demos for her second album and though dismissed by the singer at first because she wanted the album to have less guitar presence, she was convinced to compile and release them by her boyfriend. There are also plans for a further two EPs that will each focus on a different instrument - accordion and organ respectively - that together with the piano based Krómantík will form something of a trilogy.

Sóley's third LP, Endless Summer, was released in May 2017, and a European tour was announced in support of the new material. Throughout the same year, she is also taking part in a collaborative project with fellow Icelandic artists, Sin Fang and Örvar Þóreyjarson Smárason (from the band Múm), which sees the trio release a new song each month, making twelve in total, and released as Team Dreams in 2018

== Personal life ==
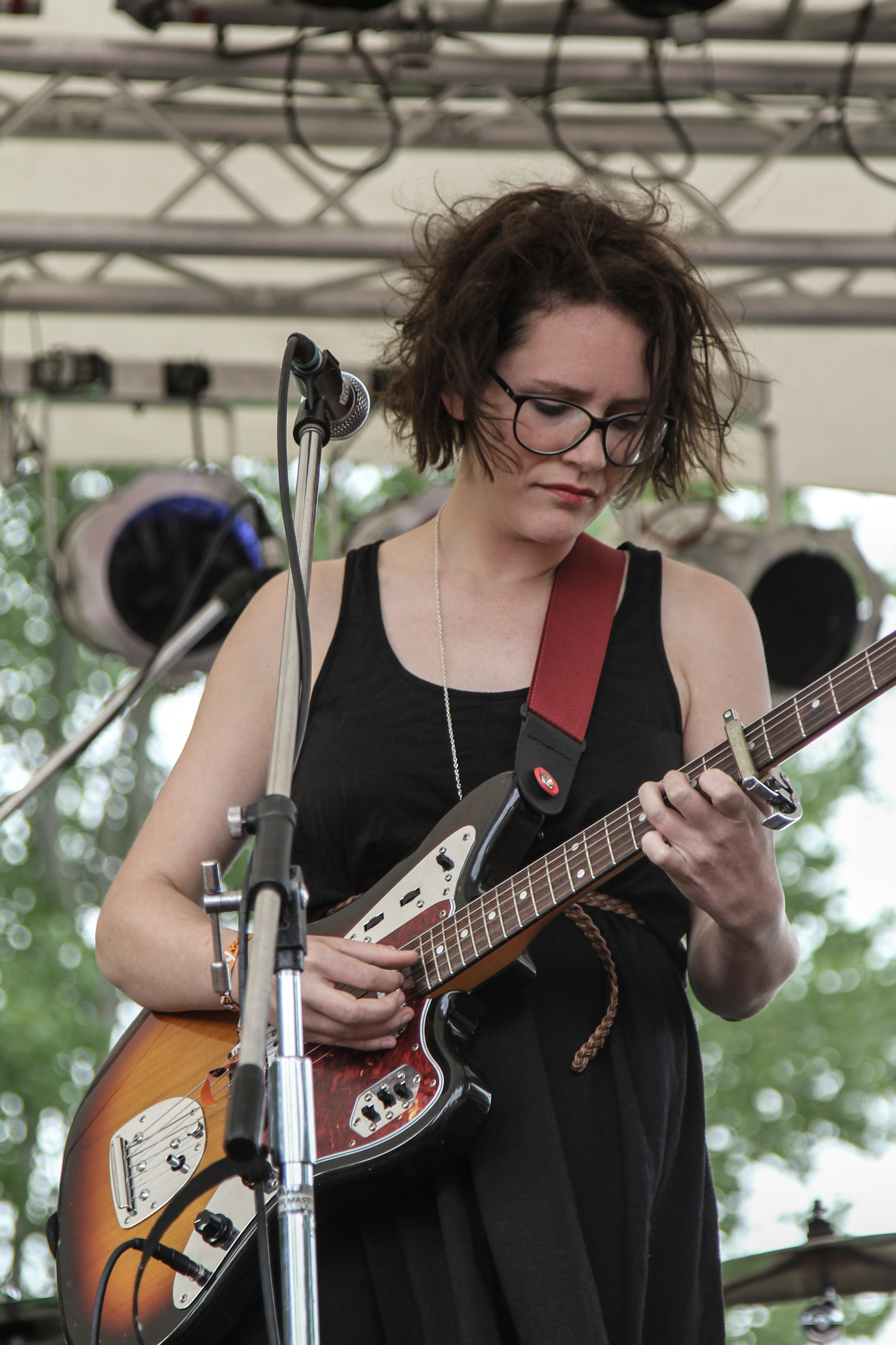
Sóley performing in 2012

Sóley was born in Hafnarfjörður, a small town outside of Reykjavík. She finds her writing inspiration mostly from poets and comes from a musical family, with her father being a trombone player and music teacher. Her younger brother, Eiríkur, and younger sister are also musicians.

She now lives in the capital with her husband, Héðinn Finnsson. She took a brief break from recording and touring when she gave birth to her first daughter in March 2014. Sóley has been vegan since her daughter was born.

== Discography ==
=== Seabear ===
Studio albums

- The Ghost That Carried Us Away (2007, Morr Music)
- We Built a Fire (2010, Morr Music)

Extended plays

- While the Fire Dies (2010, Sound of a Handshake)

Singles

- Teenage Kicks / Piano Hands 7" (2007, Morr Music)
- Lion Face Boy / Cold Summer 7" (2009, A Number of Small Things)
- Waterphone (2019, Morr Music)

=== Solo ===
==== Solo Studio albums ====
Title	Album details
We Sink	Released: 2 November 2011; Label: Morr Music; Formats: LP, CD, digital download
Ask the Deep	Released: 8 May 2015; Label: Morr Music; Formats: LP, CD, digital download
Endless Summer	Released: 5 May 2017; Label: Morr Music; Formats: LP, CD, digital download
Mother Melancholia	Released: 22 October 2021; Label: Lovitt Records (Vinyl Version), SMIT (CD Version); Formats: LP, CD, Digital Download

==== Collaborative Studio albums ====
Title	Album details
Team Dreams (with Sin Fang and Örvar Smárason)	Released: 8 December 2017; Label: Morr Music; Formats: LP, CD, digital download
Dream Is Murder (with Sin Fang and Örvar Smárason)	Released: 17 December 2021; Label: Morr Music; Formats: LP, Digital Download

==== Soundtrack albums ====
Title	Album details
HEX	Released: 2 February 2024; Formats: Digital download

==== Extended Plays ====
Title	Album details
Theater Island	Released: 26 March 2010; Label: Morr Music; Formats: LP, CD, digital download
Krómantík	Released: 18 July 2014; Label: Morr Music; Formats: LP, CD, digital download
Don't Ever Listen	Released: 30 October 2015; Label: Morr Music; Formats: LP, digital download
Harmóník	Released: 4 September 2017; Label: SMIT Records; Formats: LP, digital download
Seasick Songs (Recorded 2007)	Released: 1 May 2020; Re-Released: 2 October 2020; Label: Independent; Formats: digital download
Harmóník II	Released: 20 October 2020; Label: SMIT Records; Formats: LP, digital download

==== Compilations ====
Title	Album details
Harmóník I & II	Released: 13 November 2020; Label: SMIT Records; Formats: LP, digital download

==== Singles ====
- "Pretty Face" (2012)
- "Ævintýr" (2015)
- "Follow Me Down" (2015)
- "Halloween" (2015)
- "Don't Ever Listen" (2015)
- "Never Cry Moon" (2017)
- "Grow" (2017)
- "Sunrise Skulls" (2021)
- "Circles" (Accordion Version) (2021, recorded 2018)
- "Parasite" (Extended Version) (2022)

==== Singles (with Sin Fang and Örvar Smárason) ====
- "Randon Haiku Generator" (2017)
- "Love Will Leave You Cold" (2017)
- "Wasted" (2017)
- "Black Screen" (2017)
- "Slowly" (2017)
- "Citrus Light" (2017)
- "Tennis" (2017)
- "Space" (2017)
- "Used & Confused" (2017)
- "Go To Sleep Boy" (2017)
- "The Sun Will Go Out" (2017)
- "Dream Team Party Kids" (2017)
- "Imaginary Love" (2021)
- "Calling for Your Touch" (2021)
- "Shame" (2021)
- "Mandatory Love Story" (2021)
- "Where the Maps Run Out" (2021)
- "Tell Your New Lovers" (2021)
- "Today I Wrote Nothing" (2021)
- "Lake with No Name" (2021)
- "I Run Deep" (2021)
- "Mothership" (2021)
- "Dream is Murder" (2021)
- "Afterparty" (2021)

==== Music videos ====
List of music videos, showing year released and directors
Title	Year	Director(s)	Ref.
"We Will Put Her in Two Graves"	2010	Sóley	
"Blue Leaves"	2010	Máni M. Sigfusson	
"Smashed Birds"	2011	Inga Birgisdóttir	
"Pretty Face"	2012	ManiSigfússon	
"I'll Drown"	2012	Anne Peeters	
"Krómantik"	2014	Bruno Granato	
"Falski Píanótíminn"	2014	Héðinn Finnsson	
"Halloween"	2015	Máni Sigfússon	
"Dreamers"	2015	Ingibjörg Birgisdóttir	
"Grow"	2017	Samantha Shay	
"Úa"	2017	Máni M. Sigfússon	
"Never Change"	2020	Derrick Belcham	
"Sunrise Skulls"	2021	Samantha Shay	

== Awards and nominations ==
Year	Organisation	Category	Work	Result	Ref.
2010	Kraumur	Kraumur Award	Theater Island	Nominated	
2011	Kraumur	Kraumur Award	We Sink	Won	
2011	Icelandic Music Awards	Pop & Rock – Album of the Year	We Sink	Nominated	
2011	Icelandic Music Awards	Pop & Rock – Songwriter of the Year	Sóley	Nominated	
2015	Kraumur	Kraumur Award	Ask the Deep	Nominated	
2020	Kristján Eldjárn Memorial Fund	Incentive Prize	Herself	Won	
2021	Icelandic Music Awards	Open Class – Album	Mother Melancholia	Won	
2021	Icelandic Music Awards	Open Class – Song	"Sunrise Skulls"	Nominated	
2021	The Reykjavík Grapevine	Album of the Year	Mother Melancholia	Won	
2022	Nordic Council	Nordic Council Music Prize	Mother Melancholia	Nominated	
