= Stars on the Wall =

Studio album by The Go Find
- Released: March 30, 2007
- Recorded: 2006
- Genre: Indie pop
- Length: 42:00
- Label: Morr

The Go Find chronology
Miami (2004)	Stars on the Wall (2007)

Singles from Stars on the Wall
- 1. "New Year" Released: 2007

Professional ratings
Review scores
Source	Rating
Allmusic	3.5/5 stars

Stars on the Wall is the second album from Belgian solo act The Go Find, released in 2007 by Morr Music.

== Track listing ==
1. "Beautiful Night" (1:54)
2. "Dictionary" (4:04)
3. "New Year" (3:12)
4. "Adrenaline" (4:35)
5. "Downtown" (2:53)
6. "Ice Cold Ice" (5:16)
7. "25 Years" (4:00)
8. "Monday Morning" (2:40)
9. "We Don't Wanna" (2:45)
10. "Everything Is Low" (5:58)
11. "Kid OK" (4:52)
