= Don't Ever Listen =

EP by Sóley
- Released: 30 October 2015
- Recorded: 2012
- Genres: Indie; Acoustic; Lo-fi
- Length: 13:05
- Label: Morr Music
- Producer: Sóley

Sóley chronology
Ask the Deep (2015)	Don't Ever Listen (2015)	Endless Summer (2017)

Singles from Don't Ever Listen
- 1. "Don't Ever Listen" Released: 29 September 2015

Don't Ever Listen is the third extended play released by Icelandic singer-songwriter Sóley in 2015 through Morr Music.

== Background ==
Don't Ever Listen consists of five "intimate" songs originally recorded as demos for her second album Ask the Deep but were not included on the album because Sóley wanted "fewer guitar sounds". The songs were all recorded in 2012 either on Inis Oírr or in Sóley's home in Iceland. In an interview with Nylon magazine, Sóley explained that her boyfriend persuaded her to release the songs. She described the songs as "more or less demos that never grew any further" but nonetheless liked them and felt they "would [not] fit to a high-quality sound".

The EP has "instrumental minimalism" and its lyrics "revolve around themes of longing, fear and of course the occasional ghost".

The opening song "N.Y. Hotel" is a cover of the song of the same name by The Knife from their self-titled debut album. It was the first cover song that Sóley recorded. It was recorded on her computer's microphone one evening in an empty apartment she had just moved into. The second song "Wedding" was written while Sóley was on the Irish island Inis Oírr for an art residency. At the time, she was living in a house on top of a hill and there were only four streetlights on the island, so it was dark every night she returned to the house. The third song "While I Sleep" is about "that person you see when you wake up in the middle of the night and you don't know if you're dreaming or not". Fourth song "Don't Ever Listen" was recorded the same night as "N.Y. Hotel" and Sóley's cat Tóa can be heard on the recording. The song is about "how you can feel alone in your head, though you're in a big group of people". The final song "I Will Find You" is "a pure love song". The last song on the EP differs from the earlier tracks due to piano melodies rather than having a guitar arrangement.

=== Singles ===
The title track was released a digital single a month before the release of the EP. The song had previously been included on the 2014 compilation album Fyrir Gaza, which was released to raise funds for Aisha Association for Women and Child Protection, a Palestinian women's organization providing emergency aid for Palestinians in Gaza.

== Reception ==
Don't Ever Listen premiered online via Nylon magazine, who described the EP as "[feeling] like turning on an old record player that hasn't been touched in decades, but stumbling upon something that's completely spellbinding".

== Track listing ==
No.	Title	Writer(s)	Length
1.	"N.Y. Hotel"	Karin Dreijer; Olof Dreijer	2:44
2.	"Wedding"	Sóley Stefánsdóttir	3:07
3.	"While I Sleep (Scary Adventures)"	Sóley Stefánsdóttir	2:05
4.	"Don't Ever Listen"	Sóley Stefánsdóttir	2:02
5.	"I Will Find You"	Sóley Stefánsdóttir	3:07
Total length:			13:05

== Release history ==
Release date	Format	Label	ID No.	Ref.
30 October 2015	10-inch vinyl; Digital download	Morr Music	morr 140	
