= Tied & Tickled Trio =

German electronica/dub/jazz musical collective

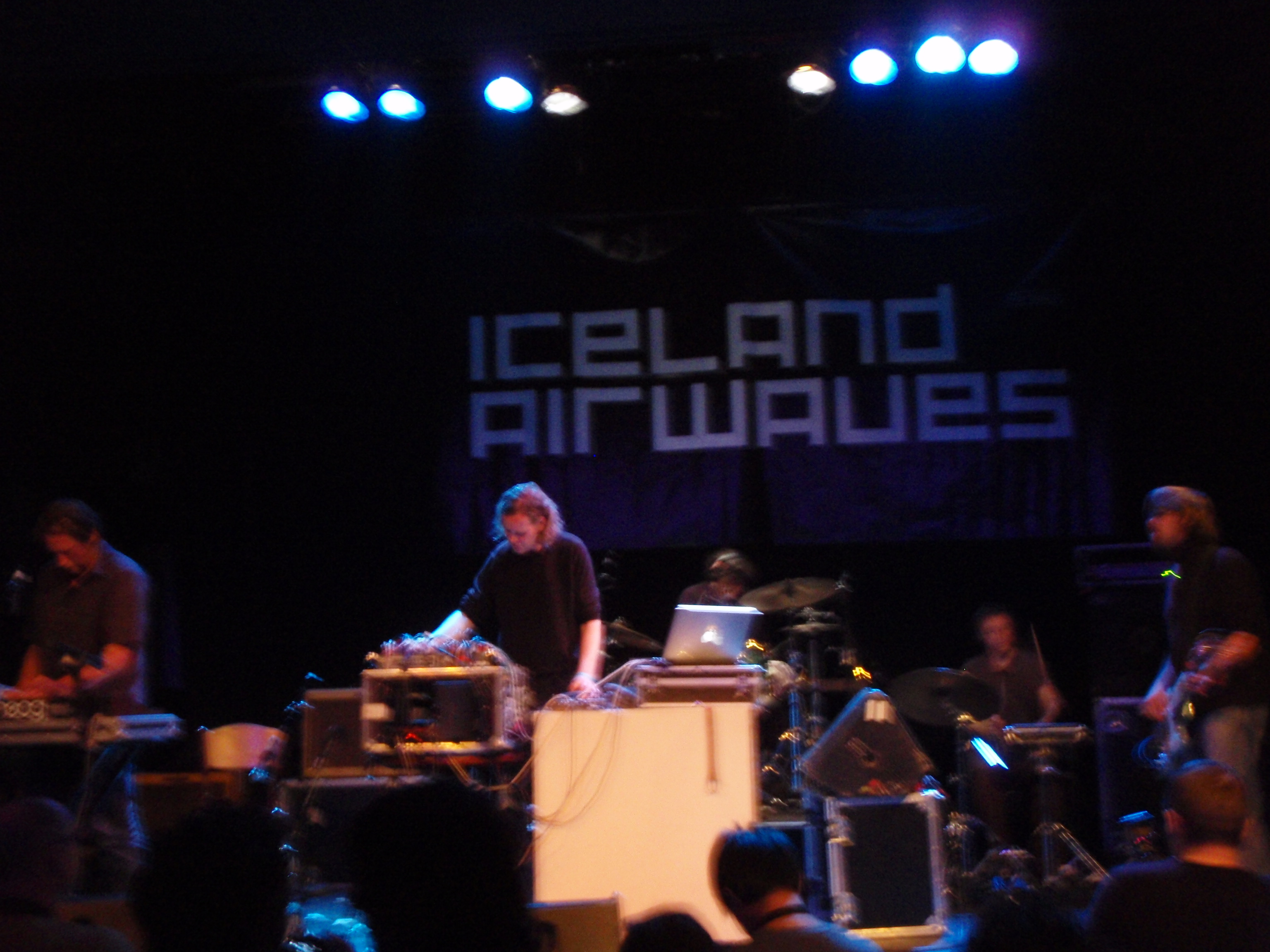

Background information
- Origin: Germany
- Genres: Electronic music Dub music Jazz
- Years active: 1994–present
- Label: Morr Music
- Members: Markus Acher; Christoph Brandner; Andreas Gerth; Micha Acher; Johannes Enders; Ulrich Wangenheim; Robert Klinger

Tied & Tickled Trio is a German electronica/dub/jazz musical collective. It was founded in 1994 by Markus Acher and Christoph Brandner in Weilheim, Bavaria as a polyrythmic duo playing drums only. After the joining of sculptor Andreas Gerth (electronics) and Markus' brother Micha (bass), the core of "Tied & Tickled Trio" was formed and their style turned to jazz. This trend later was fixed with new member coming – Johannes Enders, a studied jazz sax player.

The collective shares members with The Notwist, Lali Puna and other bands from the Morr Music label.

== Band members ==
- Ulrich Wangenheim (tenor saxophone, bass clarinet, flute)
- Johannes Enders (tenor saxophone, flute, keyboards)
- Micha Acher (bass, trumpet, trombone, keyboards, organ)
- Markus Acher (drums, keyboards, percussion)
- Andreas Gerth (electronic, delays)
- Christoph Brandner (electronic drums)
- Robert Klinger (bass)

== Discography ==
=== Albums ===
- Tied + Tickled Trio – (Payola/Kollaps, 1997) (Morr Music re-release, 2006)
- EA1 EA2 – (Payola/Virgin, 1999)
- EA1 EA2 Rmx – (Morr Music, 2000)
- Electric Avenue Tapes – (Clearspot, 2001)
- Observing Systems – (Morr Music, 2003)
- Aelita – (Morr Music, 2007)
- La Place Demon (with American drummer Billy Hart) – Morr Music, 2011

=== Other ===
- A.R.C. (Live DVD + Audio 19 minutes jam, 2006)
