= Lali Puna =

German electropop band

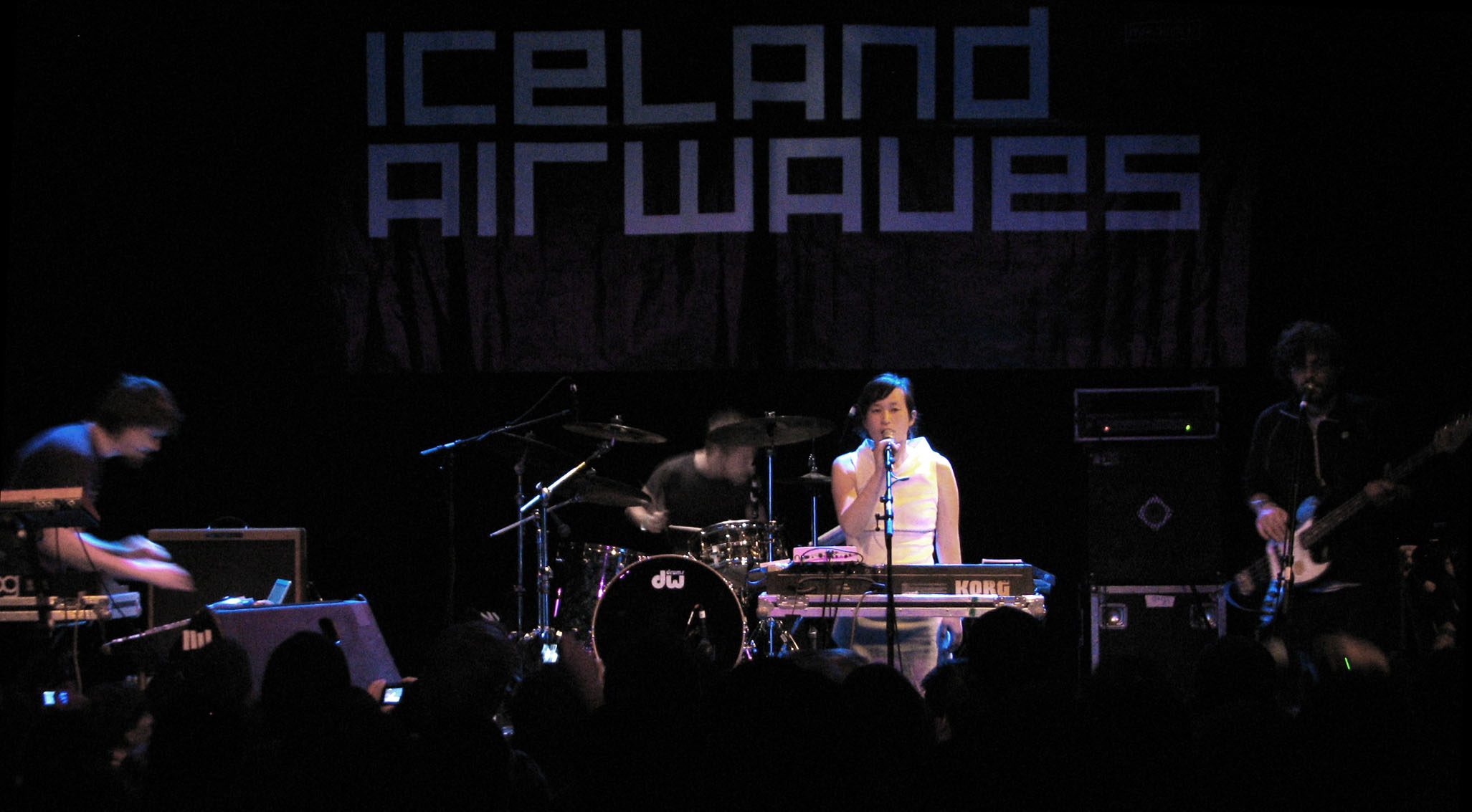
- Lali Puna performing live at Iceland Airwaves

Background information
- Origin: Weilheim in Oberbayern, Germany
- Genre: Electropop
- Years active: 1998–present
- Labels: Morr Music, Hausmusik
- Members: Valerie Trebeljahr; Christoph Brandner; Christian Heiß
- Past members: Florian Zimmer; Markus Acher
- Website: www.lalipuna.de

Lali Puna is a German, Munich-based electropop band originally from Weilheim in Oberbayern, Germany.

== History ==
Valerie Trebeljahr, the lead writer and singer, comes from Busan, Korea. The name of the band, meaning Valerie from Busan, references this, as Lali is a diminutive form of Valerie, and Puna is a childish spelling of Busan (which is often transliterated Pusan). She also lived ten years in Portugal before moving to Germany, and that's reflected in some of her songs, featuring lyrics in Portuguese.

Valerie played in an all-female band called L.B.Page, until 1998, when she released a 7" called Safe Side under the moniker Lali Puna. She was later joined by Markus Acher, already lead singer and guitarist of The Notwist and Tied & Tickled Trio (with whom she was also romantically involved and also formed a side-project called John Yoko), Christoph Brandner, who played drums with Acher in the Tied & Tickled Trio, and keyboardist Florian Zimmer.

In 2002 Florian Zimmer left for Hamburg to work on Iso68, being eventually replaced in 2003 with Christian Heiß on the Left Handed EP.

In 2017, before the release of the Two Windows album, Markus Acher left the band.

== Discography ==
=== Studio albums ===
- Tridecoder (1999)
- Scary World Theory (2001)
- Faking the Books (2004)
- Our Inventions (2010)
- Two Windows (2017)

=== Compilation albums ===
- I Thought I Was Over That: Rare, Remixed, and B-Sides (2005)

=== EPs ===
- Clear Cut (2001) with Bomb the Bass
- Left Handed (2003)
- Silver Light (2012)

=== Singles ===
- "The Safe Side" (1998)
- "Snooze" (1999)
- "Nin-Com-Pop" (2001)
- "Common Ground" (2002)
- "Micronomic" (2004)
- "Remember" (2010)
- "Move On" (2011)
- "Machines Are Human" (2014) with Trampauline
- "Deep Dream" (2017)
- "The Bucket" (2017)
- "Two Windows" (2017)
- "Being Water" (2019)

=== Remixes ===
- Two Lone Swordsmen - "It's Not the Worst (Lali Puna Remix)" from Further Reminders (2001)
- Dntel - "(This Is) The Dream of Evan and Chan (Lali Puna Remix)" from "(This Is) The Dream of Evan and Chan" (2002)
- Boom Bip - "Awaiting an Accident (Lali Puna Remix)" from Corymb (2004)
