= Ms. John Soda =

German indietronica band

- Origin: Weilheim in Oberbayern, Germany
- Genres: Indie rock, electronica
- Years active: 2002–present
- Labels: Morr Music
- Members: Stefanie Böhm; Micha Acher
- Website: www.msjohnsoda.de

Ms. John Soda is an indietronica band from Weilheim in Oberbayern, Germany. It consists of Stefanie Böhm and Micha Acher.

== History ==
Ms. John Soda released the first album No P. or D. on Morr Music in 2002. It is listed by Pitchfork Media as the 45th top album of 2003.

The While Talking EP was released on Morr Music in 2003. It includes "I & #8217," a remix medley of tracks from No P. or D. by Subtle.

The duo released the second album Notes and the Like on Morr Music in 2006.

== Discography ==
=== Albums ===
- No P. or D. (2002)
- Notes and the Like (2006)
- Loom (2015)

=== EPs ===
- Drop = Scene (2002)
- While Talking (2003)
