= Jón Trausti Sigurðarson =

Icelandic marketing director and lawyer (born 1982)

Jón Trausti Sigurðarson (born 4 January 1982) is an Icelandic marketing director and lawyer, best known for founding the Reykjavík-based, English language magazine Reykjavik Grapevine with Hilmar Grétarsson and Valur Gunnarsson. The newspaper, which Sigurðarson helped to establish, now has a circulation of almost 50,000.
