= The Go Find =

Belgian musical group

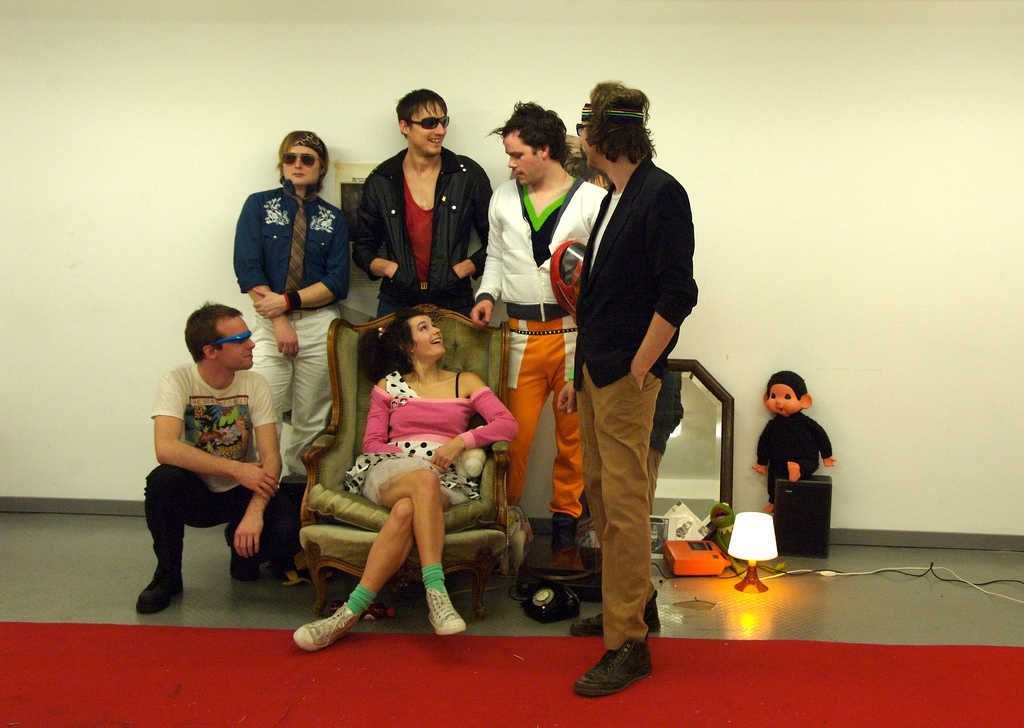
- The Go Find

Background information
- Birth name: Dieter Sermeus
- Born: 1975
- Origin: Antwerp, Belgium
- Genres: Indie Pop, Electronic
- Labels: Morr
- Website: www.thegofind.com

The Go Find is a Belgian group led by vocalist and multi-instrumentalist Dieter Sermeus (b. 1975), previously of Orange Black. Initially an electronica side-project it soon developed into a working band, which has released five albums to date.

== Discography ==
=== Albums ===
- Miami, 2004
- Stars on the Wall, 2007
- Everybody Knows It's Gonna Happen Only Not Tonight, 2010
- Brand New Love, 2014
- Present the Empathy Exams, 2023

== Reviews ==
- Splendid Magazine reviews The Go Find: Miami
- PopMatters review: The Go Find: Everybody Knows It’s Gonna Happen Only Not Tonight
