= Kinder Versions =

Studio album by Mammút
- Released: July 14, 2017
- Length: 42:54
- Label: Bella Union

Mammút chronology
Komdu til mín svarta systir (2013)	Kinder Versions (2017)

Professional ratings
Aggregate scores
Source	Rating
Metacritic	79/100
Review scores
Source	Rating
The Line of Best Fit	9.5/10
Clash	8/10

Kinder Versions is the fourth studio album by Icelandic band Mammút. It was released in July 2017 under Bella Union.

== Track listing ==
No.	Title	Length
1.	"We Tried Love"	7:44
2.	"Kinder Version"	6:22
3.	"Bye Bye"	3:42
4.	"The Moon Will Never Turn on Me"	4:04
5.	"Breathe Into Me"	3:29
6.	"Walls"	3:49
7.	"What's Your Secret?"	3:50
8.	"Pray for Air"	4:18
9.	"Sorrow"	5:36
