= Populous (musician) =

Italian electronic musician

Andrea Mangia, who uses the stage name Populous, is an Italian electronic musician from Salento.

== Biography ==
Populous studied music at university and signed with Morr Music after sending the label a demo tape. He released three full-length albums with the label, including 2005's Queue for Love, which received attention from American independent music outlets. After the 2008 release Drawn in Basic, Mangia took six years between records, returning with Night Safari for the Bad Panda label in 2014. His 2020 release W was dedicated to women and features several female guest vocalists.

== Discography ==
- Quipo (Morr Music, 2002)
- Queue for Love (Morr Music, 2005)
- Drawn in Basic with Short Stories (Morr Music, 2008)
- Night Safari (Bad Panda Records, 2014)
- Azulejos (Wonderwheel Recordings, 2017)
- W (Wonderwheel, 2020)
- Stasi (La Tempesta Dischi, 2021)
- Isla Diferente (Latinambient, 2025)
