= Brand New Love (album) =

Studio album by The Go Find
- Released: 7 February 2014
- Genre: Indie Pop, Electronic
- Label: Morr Music
- Producer: The Go Find

The Go Find chronology
Everybody Knows It’s Gonna Happen, Only Not Tonight (2010)	Brand New Love (2014)

Singles from Brand New Love
- 1. "We Run" Released: December 6, 2013

Brand New Love is the fourth album by The Go Find released on the 7 February 2014 in Europe and the 18 February 2014 in North America through Morr Music. The title of the album was inspired by the Sebadoh song of the same name.

== Track listing ==
All tracks are written by The Go Find

No.	Title	Length
1.	"Jungle Heart"	4:16
2.	"The Lobby"	3:45
3.	"We Run"	3:20
4.	"Your Heart"	3:55
5.	"We Promised Together"	3:27
6.	"Summer Boys"	4:10
7.	"Japan"	4:40
8.	"On The Rebound"	3:25
9.	"The Message"	3:02
10.	"The River"	4:04
