= Born to Be Free (Borko album) =

Studio album by Borko
- Released: October 2012
- Genre: Alternative rock, indie rock
- Length: 47:16
- Label: Kimi Records and Sound of A Handshake

Borko chronology
Celebrating Life (2008)	Born to Be Free (2012)

Born to Be Free is the second full-length album by Icelandic musician Borko. It was released in the fall of 2012 by Sound Of A Handshake.

== Track listing ==
1. "Born to Be Free" – 4:28
2. "Hold Me Now" – 3:38
3. "Abandoned in the Valley of Knives" – 5:41
4. "Two Lights" – 5:11
5. "Waking Up to Be" – 6:22
6. "Bodies" – 5:16
7. "The Final Round" – 3:52
8. "Yonder" – 5:38
9. "Sing to the World" – 7:17

== Critical reception ==
Born to Be Free was praised by Árni Matthíasson as an "exceptionally entertaining and diverse album" ("framúrskarandi skemmtileg og fjölbreytt plata").
