= Fréttatíminn =

Former Icelandic newspaper

- Type: weekly newspaper
- Founded: 1 October 2010
- Ceased publication: 7 April 2017
- Language: Icelandic
- City: Reykjavík
- Country: Iceland
- Circulation: 82,000
- OCLC number: 870995661

Fréttatíminn (Icelandic for: Newstime) was an Icelandic newspaper founded in 2010, with the first edition being published on 1 October that year. The newspaper came out every Friday, and had a circulation of approximately 82,000. Around 70,000 copies where distributed in the Reykjavík capital area. Fréttatíminn was free of charge. It went bankrupt in 2017, with its last edition being published on 7 April that year.
