= Masha Qrella =

German singer-songwriter (born 1975)

Masha Qrella (real name Mariana Kurella, born 1975 in East Berlin) is a German singer-songwriter. Her music has been described as belonging to the genres of indie pop and "a mixture of electronics and indie rock."

== Biography ==
Qrella's father was a Russian physicist and her mother was a German somnologist. Her musical career began with her playing with German bands Mina and Contriva.

== Solo career ==
Qrella's solo debut album, Luck, was released in 2004. It was followed by Unsolved Remained, released in 2005. Patrick Sisson, writing for XLR8R, compared this album's sound to the music of Aimee Mann. In 2009, Qrella released "Speak Low: Loewe and Weill in Exile", a covers album consisting of Qrella's performances of songs originally by Kurt Weill and Frederick Loewe. Qrella had been commissioned to produce the album by the Haus der Kulturen der Welt in celebration of its 50th anniversary. Eric Hill wrote in Exclaim! that on this album, Qrella's tone "manages to capture both the hope and loneliness at the heart of the songs." Her fourth album, Analogies, was released in 2012.

== Discography ==
- Luck (Monika Enterprise, 2002)
- Unsolved Remained (Morr, 2005)
- Speak Low: Loewe and Weill in Exile (Morr, 2009)
- Analogies (Morr, 2012)
- Keys (Morr, 2016)
- Woanders (2021)
