= Kraumur =

Icelandic music fund

Kraumur Music Fund is an independent Icelandic music fund and operation established by the Aurora Charity Foundation in the beginning of 2008 "to strengthen Icelandic musical life, primarily by supporting young musicians in performing and presenting their works."

Among its board of advisers are artists Björk, Mugison, and Kjartan Sveinsson (former member of Sigur Rós).

KRAUMUR’S ADVISORY BOARD

- Árni Matthíasson, journalist
- Björk
- Elísabet Indra Ragnarsdóttir, radio show host at Iceland National Radio 1
- Guðni Tómasson, chairman of the board of directors, The Iceland Symphony Orchestra
- Kjartan Sveinsson, musician
- Mugison, musician
- Sigtryggur Baldursson, director of Icelandic Music Export (IMX), and a founding member of the Sugarcubes

Kraumur runs a small office in Reykjavík, Iceland, from where it works on strengthening the position of young musicians in Iceland through direct grants, professional assistance and various forms of cooperation. Kraumur has worked with and supported artists like Mugison, amiina, FM Belfast, pianist Víkingur Ólafsson, Ólöf Arnalds, Of Monsters and Men, múm, Sólstafir, Retro Stefson, Anna Þorvalds and Dikta.

== Special initiatives ==
In the spring of 2008 Kraumur launched a program - 'Innrásin' - with the aim to support Icelandic artists to tour Iceland. Among artists featured on the first 'Innrásar-tours', playing in towns all over the island, were; Sign, Reykjavík!, Benni Hemm Hemm and Borko.

Later that year plans for the first Kraumur Awards ('Kraumsverðlaunin' in Icelandic) were announced to acknowledge and support records being released by Icelandic artists. Nominations are chosen by a selected panel of Icelandic music journalist, radio show hosts and music specialists.

== Mission ==
The Board of Aurora Charity Foundation issued the following statement when establishing the fund in January 2008;

“Icelandic musical life has a special uniqueness, in particular because of the palpable power and boldness that characterise young musicians. The Sugarcubes and Björk pioneered the global explosion of Icelandic music, and many musicians have followed in their footsteps with amazing results. Today, the Icelandic music experience has become one of the strongest elements of the image that Iceland and Icelanders enjoy abroad. The unusual interplay of pop and classical music can be a driving force in ongoing successes. The support of young musicians in their works, and in various forms of cooperation, creates a stronger foundation under this important growth area of Icelandic culture.”
