= Mammút =

Icelandic rock band

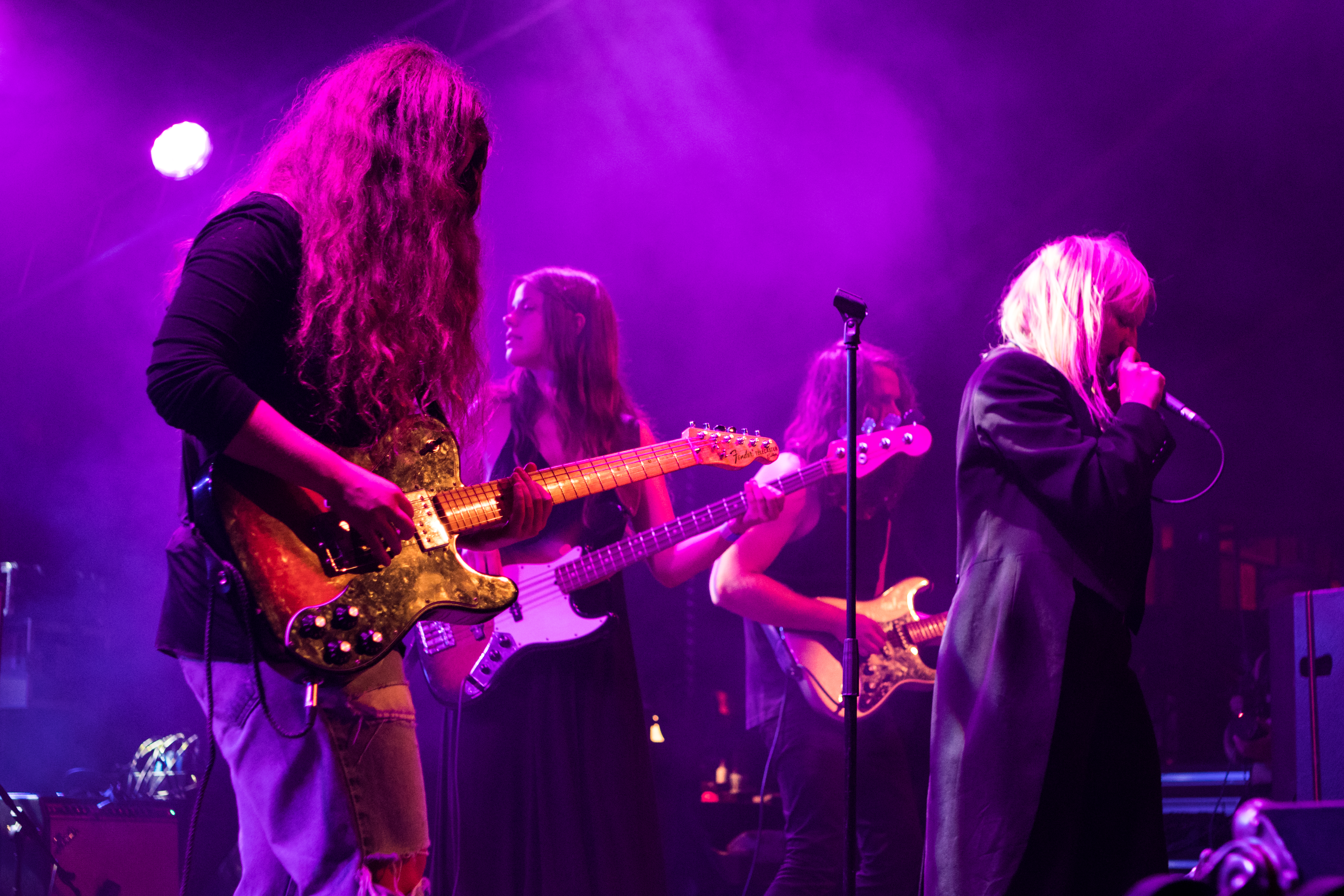
- Mammút at Haldern Pop Festival 2017

Background information
- Also known as: ROK (2003-2004); Mammút (since 2004)
- Origin: Reykjavík, Iceland
- Genres: Indie rock, post-punk, alternative rock
- Years active: 2003-present
- Members: Katrína Mogensen; Vilborg Ása Dýradóttir; Alexandra Baldursdóttir; Arnar Pétursson; Valgeir Skorri Vernharðsson
- Past members: Guðrún Heiður Ísaksdóttir; Andri Bjartur Jakobsson
- Website: www.mammut.is

Mammút is an Icelandic rock band based in Reykjavík. Formed in 2003 as ROK, an all-female trio highlighting vocalist Kata (Katrína Kata Mogensen, daughter of former Kukl bassist Birgir Mogensen), the group expanded in early 2004 to a 5-piece band by recruiting guitarist Arnar Pétursson and drummer Andri Bjartur Jakobsson, and adopted the new name Mammút.

Mammút won Músiktilraunir, the Icelandic annual battle of the bands in 2004. The band enjoys popularity in Iceland and internationally. Mammút's eponymous debut album was released in Iceland in 2006 on the Smekkleysa label founded by The Sugarcubes. The follow-up album, Karkari, was released in 2008 and included "Svefnsýkt" which became the band's first major hit with immense radio play and charting in Iceland. With Karkari, the band was nominated in the "Best Band" category at the 2008 Icelandic Music Awards.

On its tenth anniversary, the band released its third album, Komdu til mín svarta systir. The album garnered critical acclaim and earned Mammút eight nominations at the 2013 Icelandic Music Awards; the band eventually won three accolades: "Album of the Year – Pop & Rock", "Song of the Year – Pop & Rock" (for their single "Salt"), and "Album Cover of the Year".

Their 2017 album, Kinder Versions, was released on 14 July 2017 following a successful fundraising campaign on Icelandic crowdfunding website Karolina Fund.

In October of 2020, Mammút released their fifth LP titled "Ride the Fire" and Valgeir Skorri Vernharðsson made his debut as the band's drummer.

== Members ==
- Alexandra Baldursdóttir — guitar
- Arnar Pétursson — guitar
- Katrína Kata Mogensen — vocals
- Valgeir Skorri Vernharðsson - drummer
- Vilborg Ása Dýradóttir — bass
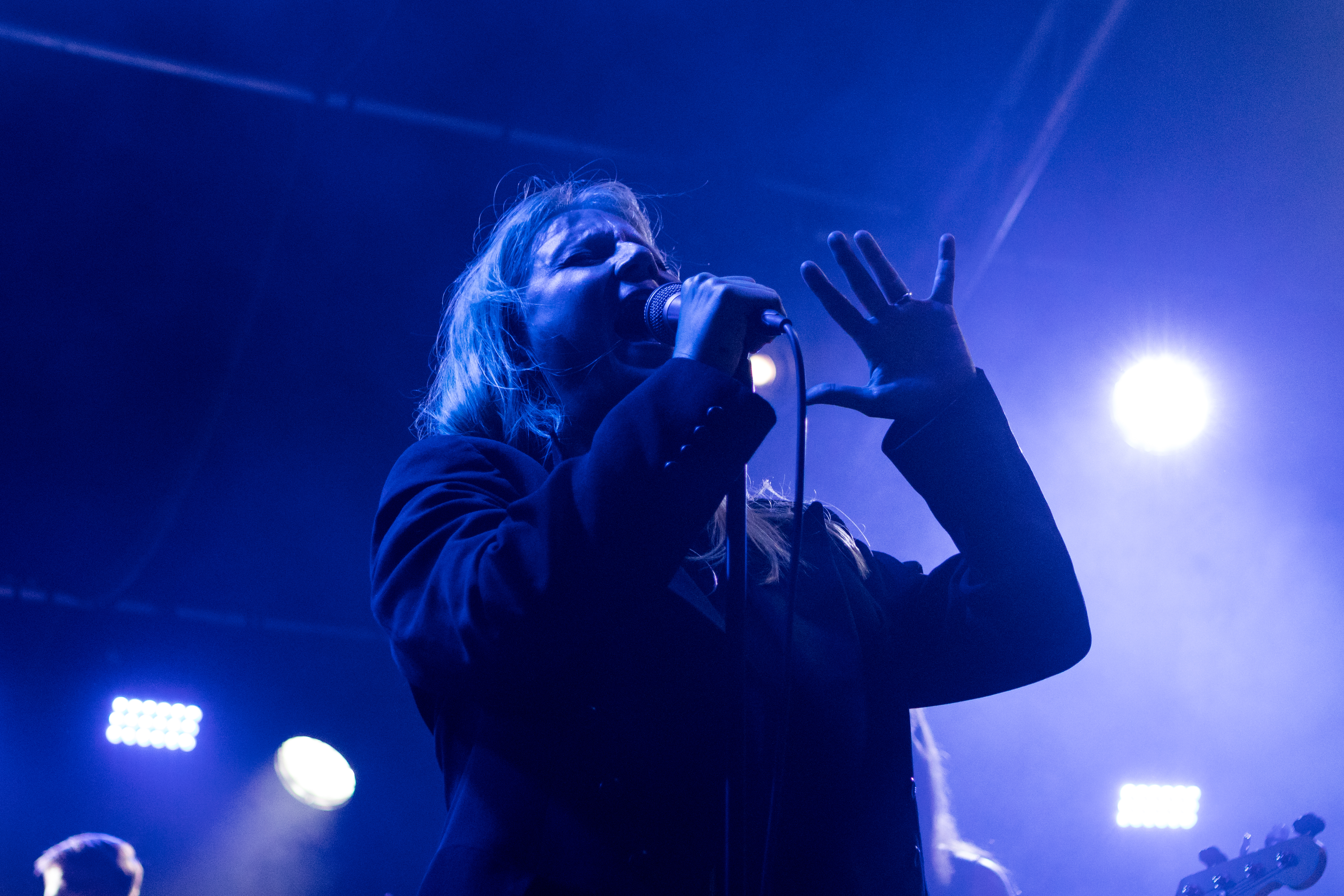
  Katrína Mogensen
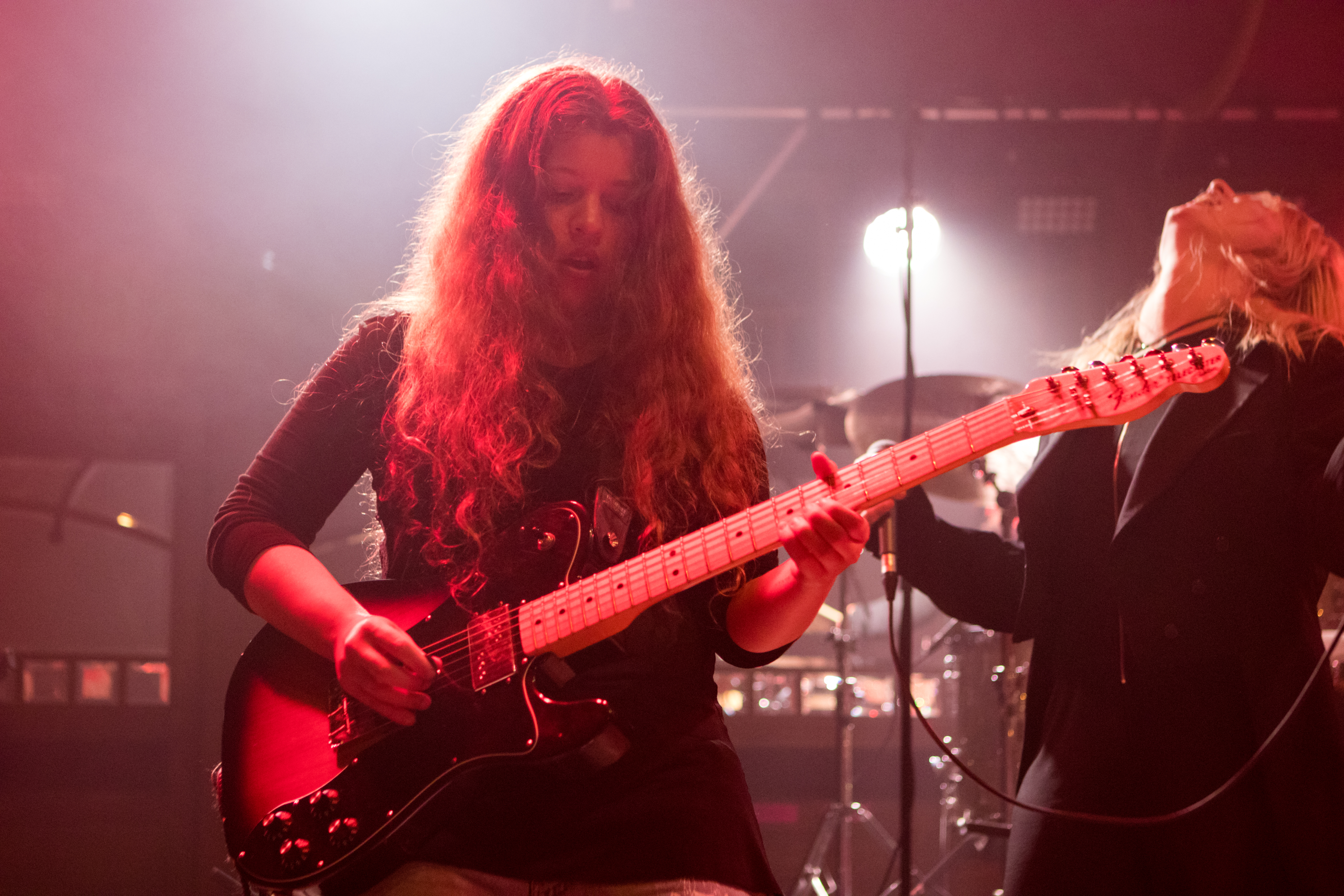
  Alexandra Baldursdóttir
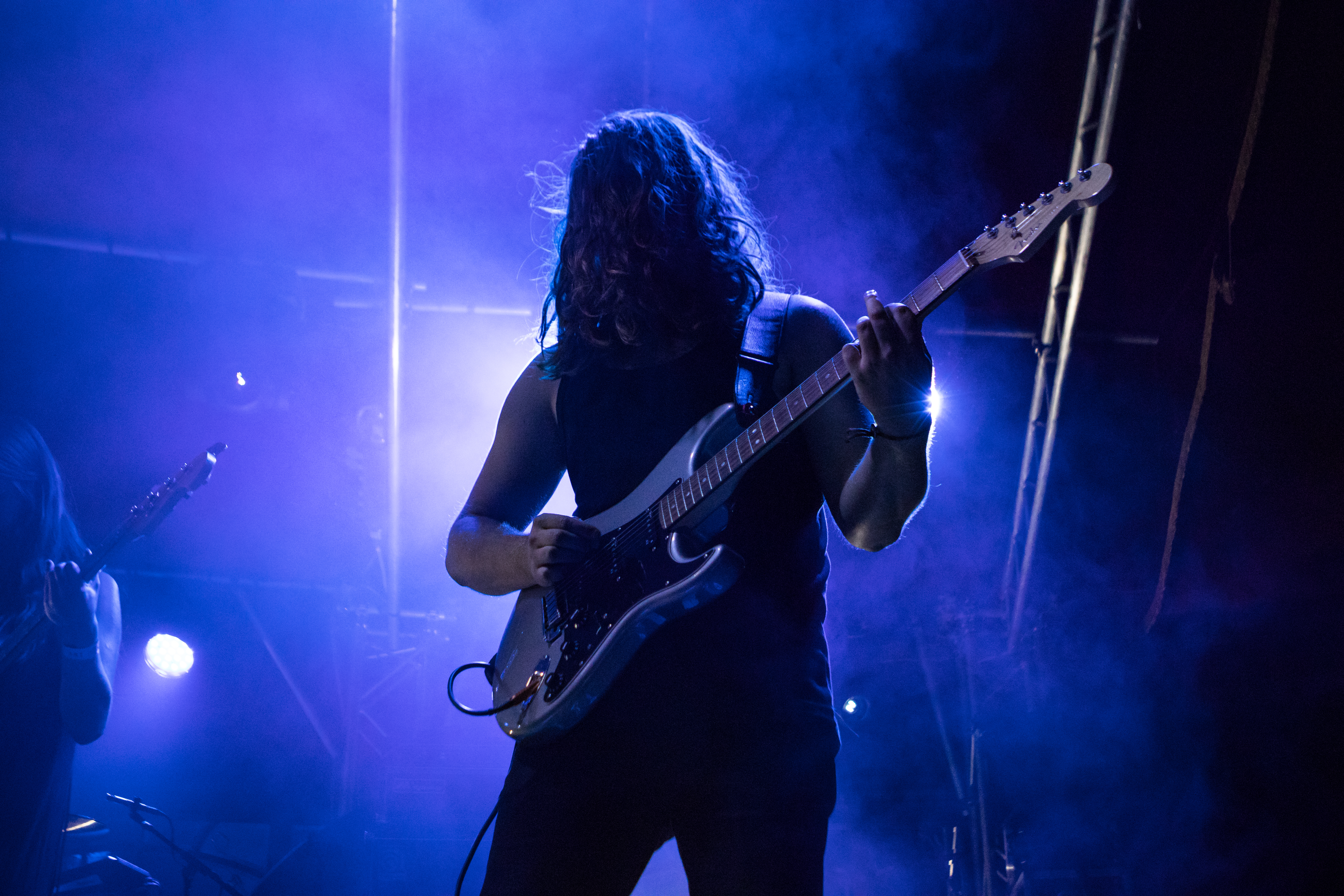
  Arnar Pétursson
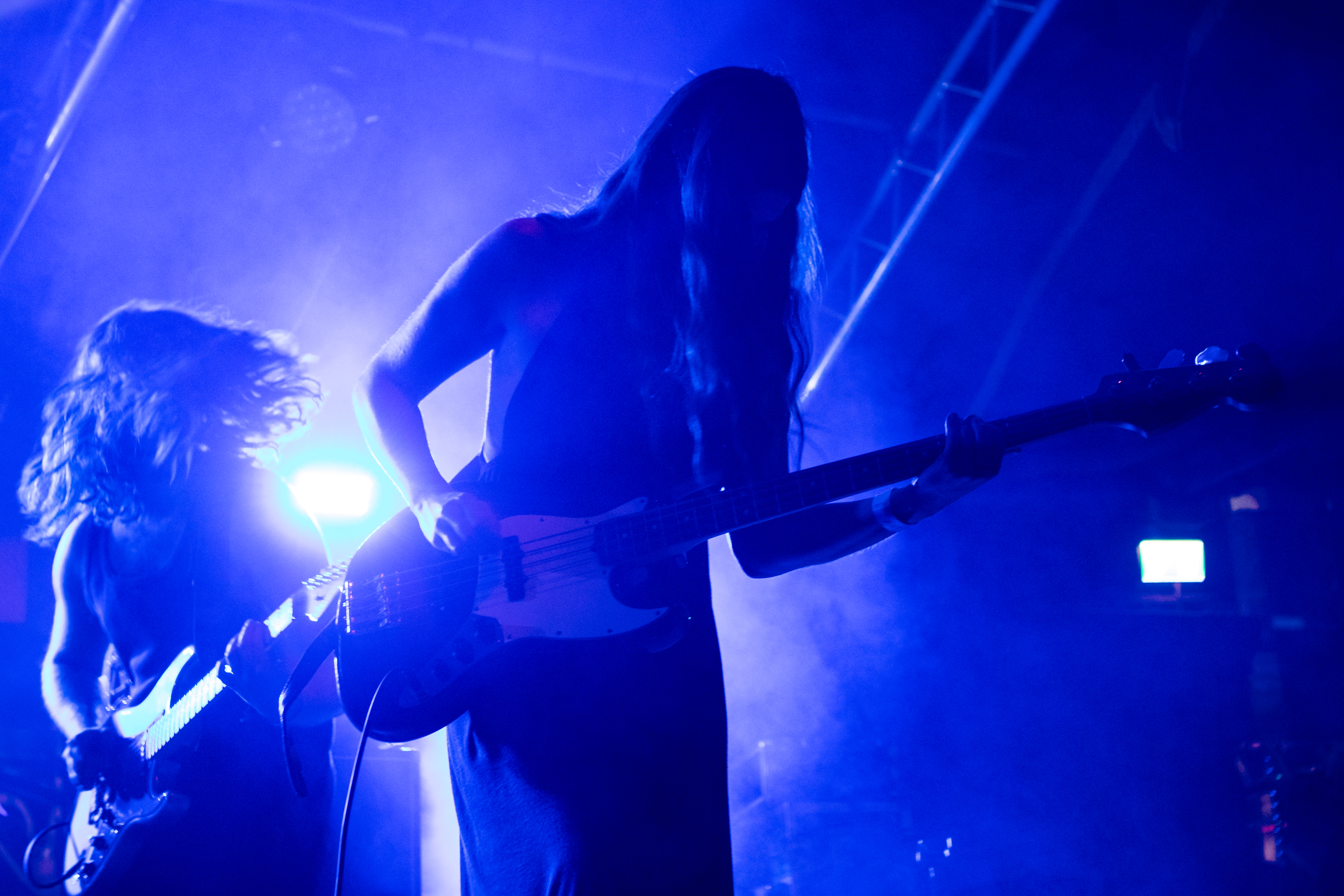
  Vilborg Ása Dýradóttir

== Discography ==
=== Albums ===
- 2006: Mammút
- 2008: Karkari
- 2013: Komdu til mín svarta systir (come to me, my black sister)
- 2017: Kinder Versions
- 2020: Ride the Fire

=== Singles ===
- 2008: "Svefnsýkt"
- 2011: "Bakkus"
- 2013: "Salt"
- 2013: "Blóðberg"
- 2014: "Ströndin"
- 2017: "Breathe into Me"
- 2017: "The Moon Will Never Turn on Me"
- 2019: "Forever on Your Mind"
