= Sin Fang =

Icelandic musician

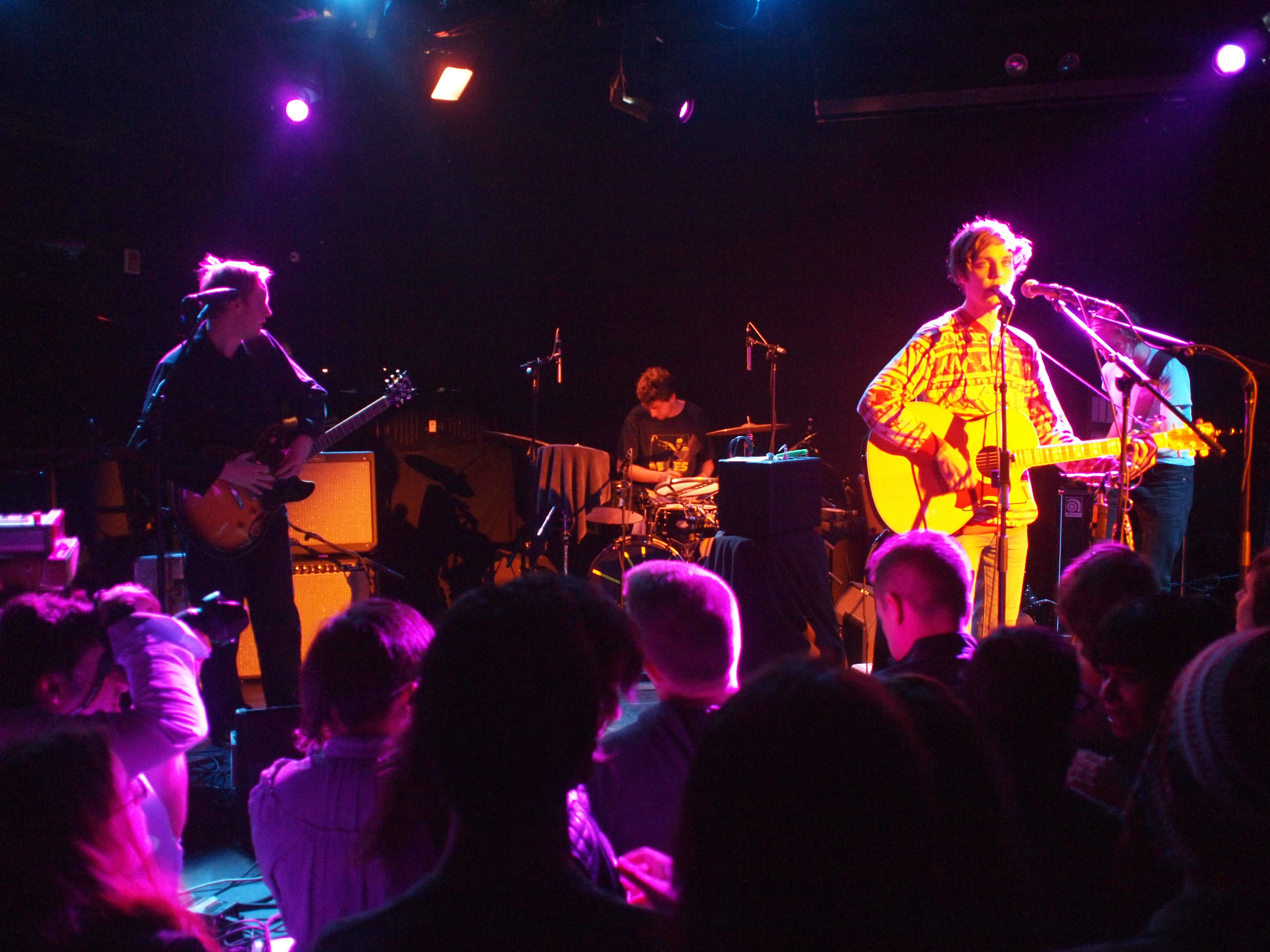
Sin Fang Bous

Sin Fang is the stage name of Sindri Már Sigfússon, an Icelandic musician and member of the band Seabear.

== History ==
Sindri founded the band Seabear in 2000, signing with the label Morr Music. Seabear was initially conceived as a solo project, but Sindri quickly added members; later in the 2000s, he began releasing solo albums under the name Sin Fang Bous. Shortening this to Sin Fang after the release of the Clangour album, Sindri has released four full-lengths as Sin Fang: Summer Echoes (2011), Flowers (2013), Spaceland (2016) and Sad Party (2019).

In 2017, take part in a collaborative project with fellow Icelandic artists, Sóley and Örvar Þóreyjarson Smárason (from the band Múm), which sees the trio release a new song each month, making twelve in total and released as Team Dreams in 2018. The group began to work on a second album with the same premise starting in 2021 with the album finished and released in 2022 as "Dream Is Murder".

== Discography ==
=== Studio albums ===
Title	Album details
Clangour (as Sin Fang Bous)	Released: 5 December 2008; Label: Morr Music (MM 088); Formats: LP, CD, digital download
Summer Echoes	Released: 4 March 2011; Label: Morr Music (MM 104); Formats: LP, CD, digital download
Flowers	Released: 31 January 2013; Label: Morr Music (MM 120); Formats: LP, CD, digital download
Spaceland	Released: 16 September 2016; Label: Morr Music (MM 149); Formats: LP, CD, digital download
Team Dreams (with Sóley and Örvar Smárason)	Released: 8 December 2017; Label: Morr Music (MM 150); Formats: LP, CD, digital download
Sad Party	Released: 8 November 2019; Label: Morr Music (MM 170); Formats: LP, CD, digital download
The Last Shall Be First	Released: 3 November 2020; Label: INNI (INNI01); Formats: Digital download
Dream is Murder (with Sóley and Örvar Smárason)	Released: 17 December 2021; Label: Morr Music (MM 185); Formats: LP, digital download
Sounds Of Fischer Vol. 1 (with Jónsi, Alex Somers and Kjartan Holm)	Released: 16 September 2022; Label: INNI; Formats: Digital download
Sounds of Summer Vol. 1 (as part of Fischersund)	Released: 18 August 2023; Label: INNI; Formats: Digital download, LP
Sounds of Christmas (as part of Fischersund)	Released: 5 December 2023; Label: INNI; Formats: Digital download, LP

=== Extended plays ===
Title	Album details
Space Echoes	Released: 28 October 2016; Label: Morr Music; Formats: Digital download, LP

=== Compilation albums ===
Title	Album details
Slim Fang (2015-2020)	Released: 23 November 2020; Label: INNI; Formats: Digital download

- Flóra (INNI, 2020)
- Foscad (INNI, 2021)
- Sikadene (Original Score) (INNI, 2023)
- The Price of a Story (INNI, 2023)
- The Black Knight (Official Soundtrack) (INNI, 2024)
- All My Friends Are Sleeping (Ambient Mixtapes 1-5) (INNI, 2024)
