= Borko =

Icelandic musician

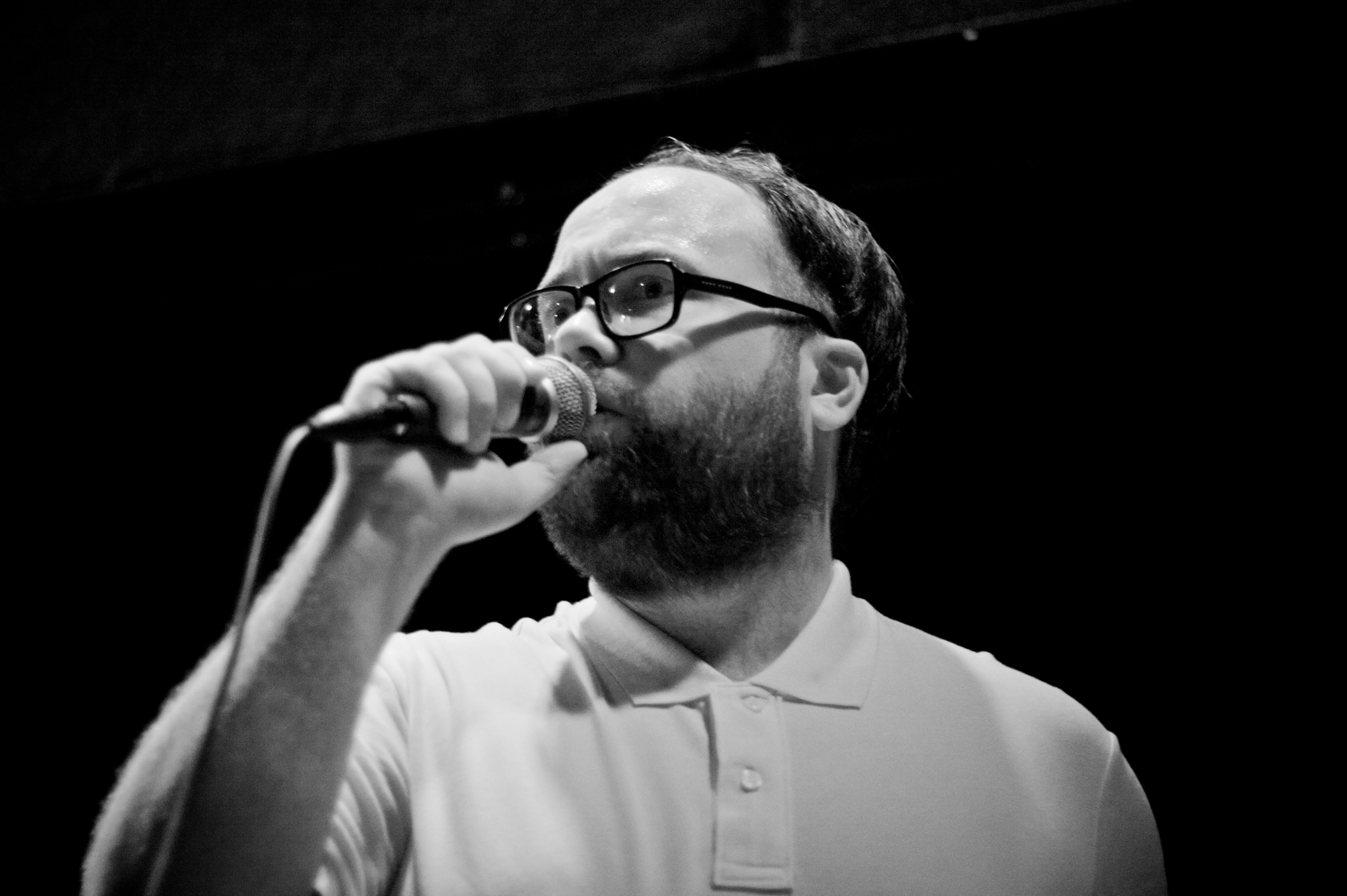
- Borko performing in Sweden, 2008

Background information
- Born: Björn Kristjánsson; Iceland
- Genres: Alternative rock; indie rock
- Instruments: Vocals; keyboard; guitar; drums
- Years active: 2008–present
- Labels: Kimi Records; Morr Music

Björn Kristjánsson, known professionally as Borko, is an Icelandic musician. His debut album, Celebrating Life, was released in March 2008 on record labels. Morr Music and Kimi Records. Borko and the band toured with the Icelandic bands. Múm, FM Belfast, and Seabear. Now he is a teacher in Laugalækjarskóli.

== Discography ==
- Celebrating Life (2008)
- Born to Be Free (2012)
