= The Reykjavík Grapevine =

English language Icelandic magazine and online news

- Type: Magazine
- Format: Tabloid
- Owner(s): Aðalsteinn Jörundsson, Jón Trausti Sigurðarson, Oddur Óskar Kjartansson & Marcus Parks
- Publisher: Jón Trausti Sigurðarson
- Editor-in-chief: Bart Cameron
- Founded: June 13, 2003
- Headquarters: Reykjavík, Iceland
- Circulation: 25,000
- ISSN: 2298-5212 (print); 2298-5220 (web)
- Website: grapevine.is

The Reykjavík Grapevine is an English-language Icelandic magazine and online newspaper based in the Icelandic capital of Reykjavík. Its target audience primarily consists of foreigners, immigrants, international students, young Icelanders, and tourists. The magazine is currently a year-round publication, fortnightly from May to October and monthly from November to April.

The magazine debuted on June 13, 2003. Its first six issues were edited by Jón Trausti Sigurðarson and Valur Gunnarsson. In its second year, the magazine grew in circulation from 25,000 issues to 30,101. In its third year, American-born Bart Cameron took over as editor, also editing Inside Reykjavík, the Grapevine Guide, in 2006 through the Mál og Menning imprint of Edda Press.

Bart was followed over the next decade by editors Sveinn Birkir Björnsson, Haukur S. Magnússon, Anna Andersen, Helga Þórey Jónsdóttir, Sveinbjörn Pálsson again, Jón Trausti Sigurðarson. and Valur Grettisson. Valur was followed by Canadian-born Catharine Fulton. In August 2025, Bart Cameron returned and took over as editor again.

During the Iceland Airwaves music festival, The Reykjavík Grapevine became a daily publication focusing on music for some years. From 2016 to 2019, The Reykjavík Grapevine published a special magazine to celebrate the Iceland Airwaves festival and started a quarterly city-guide sister publication, Best of Reykjavík. A thrice-annually Best of Iceland magazine followed. The magazine's relative longevity has positioned it uniquely as an English-language publication about Iceland and has sometimes made it a popular reference point in international news and media. The magazine's Twitter coverage of the UEFA Euro 2016 football tournament became popular internationally.
