= Morr Music =

German independent record label

Morr Music is an independent record label based in Berlin, Germany, founded in 1999 by Thomas Morr. Most artists on the label fall into the categories of intelligent dance music, electronica and dreampop, but all reflect Thomas Morr's personal taste. This results in a cohesive aesthetic observable in both the aural and visual elements of the label's releases.

== Style ==
The label's style of music, for which Thomas Morr coined the term plinkerpop (or plinker music), stems from the hybridization of electronica and indie or shoegaze rock. First popularized by the now-defunct German duo Herrmann & Kleine, plinkerpop typically consists of pop rock melodies buried beneath "glitchy" synthetic tones and layers of digital signal processing effects, such as distortion and reverb. Music journalism sites often reference bands such as My Bloody Valentine, Cocteau Twins, and Slowdive when reviewing Morr Music releases; stylistic influences confirmed by the two-disc Morr compilation album Blue Skied an' Clear, which contains one full disc of artists reworking Slowdive tracks in plinkerpop style, and another disc to which Morr bands contributed original songs "inspired by" Slowdive. Other influences on the Morr roster include Kraftwerk, OMD, the Smiths, Autechre and Seefeel.

== Roster ==
- The American Analog Set
- Benni Hemm Hemm
- F. S. Blumm
- Borko
- Butcher the Bar
- Contriva
- Couch
- Duo 505
- Electric President
- Fenster
- B. Fleischmann
- Herrmann & Kleine
- The Go Find
- Guther
- Isan
- It's a Musical
- Christian Kleine
- Lali Puna
- Limp
- Man's Best Friend
- Manual
- Ms. John Soda
- múm
- Opiate
- The Notwist
- Orcas
- Pascal Pinon
- People Press Play
- Phonem
- Populous
- Masha Qrella
- Radical Face
- Seabear
- Seavault
- Sin Fang
- Sóley
- Solvent
- Styrofoam
- Surf City
- Tarwater
- Tied & Tickled Trio
