= Raum (album) =

Studio album by Tangerine Dream
- Released: 25 February 2022
- Recorded: 2021
- Studio: Raum (Berlin, Germany); The Shoppe (Berlin, Germany)
- Genre: Electronic; ambient
- Length: 68:35
- Label: Kscope

Tangerine Dream chronology
Quantum Gate (2017)	Raum (2022)

Raum ([ʁaʊ̯m], "space, room") is a studio album by Tangerine Dream, released on 25 February 2022 through Kscope. It topped the UK Dance Albums Chart. It received generally favorable reviews from critics.

== Background ==
Raum is Tangerine Dream's second studio album since the death of founding member Edgar Froese in 2015. It was created by Thorsten Quaeschning, Hoshiko Yamane, and Paul Frick, using Froese's archives from 1977 to 2013, with access to his Cubase arrangements and tape recordings. Music videos were released for the tracks "Raum" and "You're Always On Time".

== Critical reception ==
Professional ratings
Aggregate scores
Source	Rating
Metacritic	78/100
Review scores
Source	Rating
AllMusic	3.5/5 stars
Pitchfork	6.7/10
PopMatters	7/10
Spectrum Culture	70%
Uncut	8/10

According to the review aggregator Metacritic, Raum received "generally favorable reviews" based on a weighted average score of 78 out of 100 from 7 critic scores.

Paul Simpson of AllMusic stated, "As Tangerine Dream's influence seemed more prominent throughout electronic music during the 2010s than it had since the group's heyday, the existing lineup produced the band's most inspired work in ages." He added, "Raum feels a little bit more like a transitional work than the unexpectedly solid Quantum Gate, but that album seemed like more of an overt revisit of the band's classic sound, while Raum finds them taking more chances and exploring fresh ideas." Parker Desautell of PopMatters commented that Raum is "every bit as spacey and floaty as you'd expect a Tangerine Dream album to be, but it doesn't fall into the wallpaper-music trappings that a lot of their work falls into." Ben Cardew of Pitchfork wrote, "Its unashamed drift and scale pay a tribute to a world where music is huge, omnipresent, and never ending."

== Track listing ==
Raum track listing
No.	Title	Writer(s)	Length
1.	"Continuum"	Thorsten Quaeschning; Hoshiko Yamane; Paul Frick	7:08
2.	"Portico"	Edgar Froese; Quaeschning; Yamane; Frick	6:44
3.	"In 256 Zeichen"	Quaeschning; Yamane; Frick	19:10
4.	"You're Always On Time"	Quaeschning; Yamane; Frick	8:08
5.	"Along the Canal"	Quaeschning; Yamane; Frick	5:29
6.	"What You Should Know About Endings"	Froese; Quaeschning; Yamane; Frick	6:55
7.	"Raum"	Froese; Quaeschning; Yamane; Frick	14:54
Total length:			68:35

== Personnel ==
Credits adapted from liner notes.

- Edgar Froese – synthesizer (2, 6, 7), sequencer (2, 6, 7), original photography
- Thorsten Quaeschning – musical direction, synthesizer, sequencer, piano, mixing
- Hoshiko Yamane – violin, electric violin/viola
- Paul Frick – synthesizer, sequencer, piano
- Birgir Jón Birgisson – mastering
- Bianca Froese-Acquaye – cover artwork
- Julian Moser – studio photography
- Melanie Reinisch – layout, design

== Charts ==
Chart performance for Raum
Chart (2022)	Peak position
German Albums (Offizielle Top 100)	39
Scottish Albums (OCC)	19
UK Dance Albums (OCC)	1
UK Independent Albums (OCC)	6
