= In Praise of More (album) =

Studio album by Engineers
- Released: 27 September 2010
- Recorded: York and London, 2009–2010
- Genre: Post-rock, dream pop, shoegazing, indie rock
- Length: 37:54
- Label: Kscope
- Producer: Mark Peters, Ulrich Schnauss and Dave Potter

Engineers chronology
Three Fact Fader (2009)	In Praise of More (2010)	Always Returning (2014)

Professional ratings
Review scores
Source	Rating
Spin	7/10 stars
Clash	8/10 stars
musicOMH	4/5 stars

In Praise of More is the third full-length studio album by British shoegaze band Engineers, released on 27 September 2010 through the Kscope label. It is the first to feature Daniel Land, Matthew Linley and Ulrich Schnauss as full-time members of the band.

== Track listing ==
All songs written and composed by Engineers.

No.	Title	Length
1.	"What It's Worth"	3:49
2.	"Subtober"	4:25
3.	"Las Vega"	4:10
4.	"Press Rewind"	4:06
5.	"There Will Be Time"	2:38
6.	"To an Evergreen"	5:17
7.	"Twenty Paces"	6:09
8.	"In Praise of More"	3:36
9.	"Nach Hause"	3:49

== Singles ==
- "Subtober" (6 December 2010)
  1. "Subtober" (Single Edit)
  2. "Subtober" (North Atlantic Oscillation Remix)
- "To An Evergreen EP" (13 June 2011)
  1. "To An Evergreen" (Edit)
  2. "What It's Worth" (Helios Remix)
  3. "Twenty Paces" (Beroshima Remix)
  4. "In Praise of More" (Elika Remix)
  5. "Subtober" (North Atlantic Oscillation Remix)
  6. "Twenty Paces" (A Shoreline Dream Remix)
  7. "Hey You" (Pink Floyd cover)

== Personnel ==
=== Engineers ===
- Simon Phipps: Lead vocals on 1, 2, 3, 5, 7 and 8.
- Mark Peters: Lead vocals on 4 and 6, guitars, bass and backing vocals on 7 and 8. All instruments, programming and backing vocals on 1-6 and 9 except/in addition to:
- Daniel Land: Backing vocals on 1, 2, 3, 4 and 5.
- Ulrich Schnauss: Synthesizers, cp 80 and backing vocals on 7 and 8.
- Matthew Linley: Drums and percussion on 7 and 8.

=== Additional musicians ===
- Jayn Hanna: Backing vocals on 1, 3 and 4.
- Ant Read: Drums on 3.
- Craig Sergeant: Percussion on 3.
- Judith Beck: Backing vocals on 7 and 8.

=== Producers ===
- Tracks 1–6 and 9 produced and mixed by Mark Peters.
- Additional production by Dave Potter on 1, 3, 4, 5 and 6.
- Additional mixing on 1–6 by Ulrich Schnauss.
- Additional engineering on 1, 3 and 5 by Craig Sergeant.
- Tracks 7 and 8 produced and mixed by Ulrich Schnauss and Mark Peters.
- Additional engineering on 7 and 8 by Adrian Hall.
- Mastered by Tom Durack.

=== Graphic artists ===
- Mark Peters – cover photography.
- Iain Fuller and Mark Peters – other photography.
- Iain Fuller and Scott Robinson – CD package design.
