= Always Returning =

Studio album by Engineers
- Released: 11 August 2014
- Recorded: York, London, September 2013 – May 2014
- Genre: Post-rock, dream pop, shoegazing, indie rock
- Length: 41:19
- Label: Kscope
- Producer: Mark Peters and Ulrich Schnauss

Engineers chronology
In Praise of More (2010)	Always Returning (2014)

Professional ratings
Aggregate scores
Source	Rating
Metacritic	77/100
Review scores
Source	Rating
Allmusic	4/5 stars
musicOMH	4/5 stars
Under the Radar	6.5/10 stars
The Upcoming	4/5 stars

Always Returning is the fourth full-length studio album by British shoegazing band Engineers, released on 11 August 2014 through the Kscope label. The album is the first to feature Mark Peters on lead vocals throughout, with the rest of the band consisting of Ulrich Schnauss and Matthew Linley. It is the first release not to include vocalist Simon Phipps. The album was preceded by a single, "Fight Or Flight", released on 28 July 2014, with a second single, "A Million Voices," out on 19 January 2015.

== Track listing ==
All songs written and composed by Engineers.

No.	Title	Length
1.	"Bless the Painter"	3:15
2.	"Fight or Flight"	4:23
3.	"It Rings So True"	4:18
4.	"Drive Your Car"	3:51
5.	"Innsbruck"	4:19
6.	"Searched for Answers"	3:05
7.	"Smiling Back"	4:43
8.	"A Million Voices"	3:25
9.	"Smoke and Mirrors"	3:43
10.	"Always Returning"	6:17

== Singles ==
- "Fight Or Flight" (28 July 2014)
  1. "Fight Or Flight"
  2. "Drive Your Car (Instrumental)"
- "A Million Voices" (19 January 2015)
  1. "A Million Voices"
  2. "One Possible Ending"
  3. "Smoke and Mirrors (demo)"

== Personnel ==
=== Engineers ===
- Mark Peters: Vocals, guitars, bass and sampler on all songs. Keyboards on 8.
- Ulrich Schnauss: Synths on all songs.
- Matthew Linley: Drums on all songs except 3 and 9, synth on 2, organ on 3 and 8 and piano on 4, 5, 7, 9, 10.

=== Additional musicians ===
- Sophie McDonnell: Vocals on all songs except 9.
- Craig Sergeant: Harmonica on 10.
- Maud Waret: Backing vocals on 8.
- Anna Drysdale: French horn on 2 and 8.

=== Producers ===
- Produced and mixed by Mark Peters at home in York except:
- Ulrich's synths: produced and mixed by him at his home in London.
- Drums and piano: engineered by Elliot Ireland, recorded at Pedigree Cuts studio, London.
- Matthew's keyboards, Maud's vocals and Anna's French horn produced by him at his home in London.
- Mastering by Tom Meyer at Master And Servant, Hamburg
