= Quantum Key =

Studio album (mini-album) by Tangerine Dream
- Released: 20 November 2015
- Recorded: 2015
- Studios: Eastgate, Vienna, Austria; Townend, Berlin, Germany
- Genres: Electronic, ambient
- Length: 32:50
- Label: Invisible Hands Music Eastgate
- Producer: Bianca Froese-Acquaye

Tangerine Dream chronology
The Official Bootleg Series Volume One (2015)	Quantum Key (2015)	The Official Bootleg Series Volume One (2016)

Tangerine Dream mini-album chronology
Mala Kunia (2014)	Quantum Key (2015)	Particles (2016)

Reviews
Review scores
Source	Rating
Record Collector	3/5 stars
Babyblaue-Seiten	11/15

Quantum Key is a 2015 mini-album by Tangerine Dream. It is roughly the group's 145th release. It is a precursor and companion album to the 2017 major studio album Quantum Gate.

== Track listing ==
All tracks composed by Edgar Froese, Thorsten Quaeschning and Ulrich Schnauss except where noted

1. "Genesis of Precious Thoughts" – 9:13
2. "Electron Bonfire" – 5:05
3. "Drowning in Universes" – 11:07
4. "Mirage of Reality" – 6:44 (Quaeschning, Schnauss)

== Personnel ==
Tangerine Dream

- Edgar Froese – synthesizers, guitar
- Thorsten Quaeschning – Musical director, synthesizers, guitar, steel drums, bass guitar
- Ulrich Schnauss – synthesizers, sequencer
- Hoshiko Yamane – violin

Credits

- Bianca Froese-Acquaye – producer
- Birgir Jón Birgisson – mastering
- Katja Zerull – printing supervisor
- Ian Laidlaw – band photography
