= Deep Blue Remixes =

EP by Mark Peters & Elliot Ireland
- Released: October 21, 2016
- Genre: Electronic
- Length: 23:37
- Label: Pedigree Cuts

Mark Peters & Elliot Ireland chronology
Deep Blue (2015)	Deep Blue Remixes (2016)

Professional ratings
Review scores
Source	Rating
The Big Takeover	(favourable)

Deep Blue Remixes is a collection of remixes created following the release of Deep Blue, the debut collaborative album by Mark Peters and Elliot Ireland, released on 21 October 2016. This collection was released as an EP by the record label Pedigree Cuts (part of Warner/Chappell Production Music). The EP was originally released via Juno Download on 7 October 2016, and featured an exclusive bonus track, ′Cloudsurfing (Engineers Remix).′ The bonus track was no longer available following the full release.

== Track listing ==
No.	Title	Length
1.	"Oar (Ulrich Schnauss Remix)"	6:17
2.	"The Aching Light (Arovane Remix)"	3:17
3.	"Mountain of Silver (Jonas Munk Remix)"	4:49
4.	"Deep Blue (Engineers Remix)"	5:39
5.	"Secret Solstice (Clem Leek Remix)"	3:35
Total length:		23:37

== Personnel ==
- Mark Peters: Vocals, guitars, bass, sampler/programming.
- Elliot Ireland: Guitars, bass, piano, synth.

=== Additional musicians ===
- Sophie McDonnell: Vocals.
- Dan Hewson: Electric piano and piano.
- Flavio Carvalho: Drums.
- Shawn Lee: Drums on 1.

=== Producers ===
- Produced, recorded and mixed by Mark Peters and Elliot Ireland at Mark's home in York and Pedigree Cuts Studios, London.
