= Mala Kunia =

Studio album (mini-album) by Tangerine Dream
- Released: 17 November 2014
- Recorded: 2014
- Genres: Electronic, Berlin-School
- Length: 52:11
- Label: Eastgate
- Producer: Edgar Froese

Tangerine Dream chronology
Phaedra Farewell Tour – The Concerts (2014)	Mala Kunia (2014)	Booster VII (2015)

Tangerine Dream mini-albums chronology
Josephine the Mouse Singer (2014)	Mala Kunia (2014)	Quantum Key (2015)

Reviews
Review scores
Source	Rating
BeyondChron	positive
Stereonet	5/5 stars

Mala Kunia (2014) is a mini-album and roughly the 140th release by electronic music group Tangerine Dream. Violinist Hoshiko Yamane is not credited on this release.

== Overview ==
Mala Kunia was released as a limited edition on occasion of the Australian concerts in late 2014. The album features seven new compositions, including two which were co-composed by new band member Ulrich Schnauss together with Edgar Froese.

With this release a new Tangerine Dream era was started, "The Quantum Years", which focuses on a more back to basics approach to composition influenced by quantum physics.

This album is named for the name of two Indigenous Australian tribes – according to Pitjantjatjara mythology – living ages ago around Uluru, also known as Ayers Rock, whereas the Mala (rufous hare-wallaby) tribe lived on the sunny northern side and the Kunia people (Kuniya, woma python) on the shaded southern side of the rock.

The first 100 orders shipped of this release came with a photo postcard signed by all four members of the band.

== Track listing ==
All compositions by Edgar Froese, except where indicated.

1. "Shadow And Sun" – 7:54 (Edgar Froese, Ulrich Schnauss)
2. "Madagaskunia" – 6:51
3. "Madagasmala" – 7:04 (Edgar Froese, Ulrich Schnauss)
4. "Beyond Uluru" – 7:49
5. "Vision of the Blue Birds" - 8:39
6. "Snake Men's Dance at Dawn" - 5:51
7. "Power of the Rainbow Serpent" - 8:03 (Thorsten Quaeschning)

== Personnel ==
Tangerine Dream

- Edgar Froese
- Thorsten Quaeschning
- Ulrich Schnauss
