= Deep Blue (Mark Peters and Elliot Ireland album) =

Studio album by Mark Peters & Elliot Ireland
- Released: 4 September 2015
- Recorded: York, London 2014–15
- Genre: Dream pop, indie rock
- Length: 46:34
- Label: Pedigree Cuts
- Producer: Mark Peters & Elliot Ireland

Mark Peters & Elliot Ireland chronology
Deep Blue (2015)	Deep Blue Remixes (2016)

Professional ratings
Review scores
Source	Rating
The Big Takeover	(favourable)
Penny Black Music	(favourable)

Deep Blue is the debut collaborative studio album by Mark Peters of Engineers and Elliot Ireland, released on 4 September 2015, through Pedigree Cuts, a label that boasts Peters' Engineers bandmate, Ulrich Schnauss, on its roster.

In 2016, the track Deep Blue was used in the soundtrack for Realive, a science fiction film written and directed by Mateo Gil.

Following the album, the duo released Deep Blue Remixes in October 2016, featuring reworkings of album tracks including Ulrich Schnauss, Arovane and more.

== Track listing ==
All songs written and composed by Mark Peters & Elliot Ireland.

No.	Title	Length
1.	"Seven Year Monday"	2:59
2.	"Mojave Eagle"	4:46
3.	"Interstate 80 West"	4:43
4.	"Deep Blue"	4:48
5.	"Oar"	6:01
6.	"When You Sleep"	3:48
7.	"Mountain of Silver"	2:22
8.	"The Aching Light"	3:50
9.	"Scarlet Sunset"	3:33
10.	"Cloud Surfing"	3:47
11.	"Secret Solstice"	3:22
12.	"When You Dream"	2:35

== Personnel ==
- Mark Peters: Vocals, guitars. bass on all songs except 8. Sampler/programming on 1, 2, 3, 4, 8, 10, 11. Synth on 6 and 9.
- Elliot Ireland: Guitar on 3, 6, 11, 12. Bass on 8. Piano on 2, 3, 5, 7, 8, 9, 10, 11. Clarinet on 3 and 9. Synth on 11. Ukulele on 12. Whistling on 9.

=== Additional musicians ===
- Sophie McDonnell: Vocals on 1, 2, 4, 6 and 8.
- Dan Hewson: Electric piano and piano on 1 and 8.
- Flavio Carvalho: Drums on all songs except 5, 11 and 12.
- Shawn Lee: Drums on 5.

=== Producers ===
- Produced, recorded and mixed by Mark Peters and Elliot Ireland at Mark's home in York and Pedigree Cuts Studios, London.
