= AztecCormorant =

Studio album by Matthew Gilbert Linley
- Released: January 2014
- Recorded: London, 2011 - 2013
- Genre: Psychedelic music, dream pop, shoegazing, Folktronica
- Length: 32:54
- Producer: Matthew Gilbert Linley

Professional ratings
Review scores
| Source | Rating |

AztecCormorant is the third full-length studio album by London-based composer/producer Matthew Gilbert Linley, and was released in January 2014 under the same project name. The tracks 'And Lo' and 'In Serenades' were featured on Tom Robinson's July and November 2014 BBC 6 Music Mixtapes.

== Track listing ==
| No. | Title | Length |
|---|---|---|
| 1. | "Alight!" | 4:16 |
| 2. | "You Always Left" | 3:27 |
| 3. | "Cormorant Flying" | 2:48 |
| 4. | "And Lo" | 2:52 |
| 5. | "In Serenades" | 3:21 |
| 6. | "Ritornello" | 3:24 |
| 7. | "Interlude" | 2:31 |
| 8. | "A Lock Of Your Hair" | 3:14 |
| 9. | "Novus Ordo Mundi" | 4:37 |
| 10. | "Reprise" | 2:24 |

== Personnel ==
=== Musicians ===
- Matthew Gilbert Linley: Synths, organs, celeste and piano, drums and percussion.
- Maud Waret: Vocals.
- Roger Linley: Double bass, bass guitar.
- Brian Lee: Violin, spoken word on 9.
- Geoff Irwin: Viola.
- Masumi Yamamoto: Harpsichord.
- Anna Drysdale: French horn.
- Feargal Murray: Vocals on 9.

=== Production ===
- Recorded and produced by Matthew Gilbert Linley in London, except:
- Drums recorded at Tileyard Studios by Nikolaj Bjerre.
- Mixed in London by Mark Peters of Engineers.
- Mastered by Duncan Cowell at Sound Mastering London.
