= Goodbye (Ulrich Schnauss album) =

Ulrich Schnauss album

Studio album by Ulrich Schnauss
- Released: 10 July 2007
- Genres: Shoegaze, new-age
- Length: 55:55
- Labels: Independiente / ISOM68CD (Europe), Domino (US)
- Producer: Ulrich Schnauss

Ulrich Schnauss chronology
| Quicksand Memory EP (2007) | Goodbye (2007) | Underrated Silence (2012) |

Professional ratings
Aggregate scores
| Source | Rating |
|---|---|
| Metacritic | 64/100 |
Review scores
| Source | Rating |
| About.com | 5/5 stars |
| AllMusic | 4/5 stars |
| Blender | 3.5/5 stars |
| The Line of Best Fit | 80% |
| NME | 8/10 |
| Pitchfork | 5.4/10 |
| The Skinny | 4/5 stars |
| Spin | 8/10 |
| Stylus | B− |
| Tiny Mix Tapes | 4.5/5 stars |

Goodbye is the third album by German musician and producer Ulrich Schnauss.

It was originally released as a ten track album, then re-released on Independiente on 20 Jul 2008 in a revised form with a wider dynamic range and two additional tracks. For the album's 2019 boxset remaster, the tracklist was reordered again.

== Track listing ==
All tracks are written by Ulrich Schnauss, except where noted.

2007 release
| No. | Title | Writer(s) | Length |
|---|---|---|---|
| 1. | "Never Be The Same" | | 5:31 |
| 2. | "Shine" (featuring Longview) | Schnauss, McVey | 5:50 |
| 3. | "Stars" | | 6:21 |
| 4. | "Einfeld" | | 5:16 |
| 5. | "In Between the Years" (featuring Judith Beck) | | 3:53 |
| 6. | "Here Today, Gone Tomorrow" | | 5:04 |
| 7. | "A Song About Hope" | | 5:55 |
| 8. | "Medusa" | | 6:27 |
| 9. | "Goodbye" | | 7:55 |
| 10. | "For Good" (featuring Judith Beck) | Judith Beck | 3:43 |
| Total length: | | | 55:56 |

2008 revised release
| No. | Title | Writer(s) | Length |
|---|---|---|---|
| 1. | "Never Be The Same" | | 5:31 |
| 2. | "Shine" (featuring Longview) | Schnauss, Rob McVey | 5:50 |
| 3. | "Stars" | | 6:21 |
| 4. | "Einfeld" | | 5:16 |
| 5. | "Here Today, Gone Tomorrow" | | 5:04 |
| 6. | "A Song About Hope" | | 5:55 |
| 7. | "Medusa" | | 6:27 |
| 8. | "Goodbye" | | 7:55 |
| 9. | "For Good" (featuring Judith Beck) | Judith Beck | 3:43 |
| 10. | "Love Forever" (featuring Chapterhouse) | Simon Rowe | 5:58 |
| 11. | "Look At The Sky" (featuring Rob McVey and Below the Sea) | Schnauss, McVey, Below the Sea | 4:29 |
| 12. | "In Between the Years" (featuring Judith Beck) | | 3:53 |
| Total length: | | | 66:23 |

Tracks 10, 11, and 12 are listed separately on the packaging as bonus tracks.

2019 remastered release
| No. | Title | Writer(s) | Length |
|---|---|---|---|
| 1. | "Never Be The Same" | | 5:31 |
| 2. | "Shine" (featuring Longview) | Schnauss, Rob McVey | 5:50 |
| 3. | "Stars" | | 6:21 |
| 4. | "Einfeld" | | 5:16 |
| 5. | "Here Today, Gone Tomorrow" | | 5:04 |
| 6. | "A Song About Hope" | | 5:55 |
| 7. | "Medusa" | | 6:27 |
| 8. | "Goodbye" | | 7:55 |
| 9. | "In Between the Years" (featuring Judith Beck) | | 3:53 |
| 10. | "Love Forever" (featuring Chapterhouse) | Simon Rowe | 5:58 |
| 11. | "Look At The Sky" (featuring Rob McVey and Below the Sea) | Schnauss, McVey, Below the Sea | 4:29 |
| 12. | "For Good" (featuring Judith Beck) | Judith Beck | 3:43 |
| Total length: | | | 66:23 |

== Singles ==
1. "Quicksand Memory EP" (28 May 2007)
2. "Stars EP" (19 Aug 2008)
