= Engineers (Engineers album) =

Album by Engineers

Studio album by Engineers
- Released: 7 March 2005
- Recorded: 2004
- Genre: Post-rock; dream pop; shoegazing; indie rock
- Length: 49:31
- Label: The Echo Label
- Producer: Engineers; Kevin Bacon; Jonathan Quarmby; Tim Holmes

Engineers chronology
Folly EP (2004)	Engineers (2005)	Three Fact Fader (2009)

Singles from Engineers
- 1. "Come In Out Of The Rain" Released: 20 September 2004; 2. "Forgiveness" Released: 21 February 2005; 3. "Home" Released: 13 June 2005

Professional ratings
Aggregate scores
Source	Rating
Metacritic	81/100
Review scores
Source	Rating
AllMusic	3.5/5 stars
Austin Chronicle	3.5/5 stars
Drowned in Sound	8/10
NME	9/10
Pitchfork	7.2/10
PopMatters	9/10
Q	4/5 stars
Stylus	B+
Tiny Mix Tapes	4/5 marks
Under the Radar	7/10

Engineers is the debut studio album of the British shoegaze band Engineers, released on 7 March 2005 by the Echo Label. Engineers was supported by the release of two singles, "Forgiveness" in February 2005 and "Home" in June 2005. The album was preceded by the mini-album Folly on 27 September 2004, which includes the album version of "Come in Out of the Rain" and the original mix of "Forgiveness".

The album was released to generally positive reviews; at Metacritic, which assigns a normalised rating out of 100 reviews from mainstream critics, the album has received a generally favourable score of 81, based on 18 reviews.

In 2010, the song "Home" became the theme song for the HBO TV series Big Love.

== Artwork ==
The artwork for releases by Engineers during this period feature paintings by British artist David Thorpe (through the Maureen Paley gallery):

- Folly EP
  - front cover: Do What You Have to Do, 1998
- Engineers album
  - front cover: Pilgrims, 1999
  - booklet: Untitled (Skyline), 1999
- "Forgiveness" single
  - front cover: Out from the Night, the Day Is Beautiful and We are Filled with Joy, 1999

== Track listing ==
All tracks are written by Engineers.

No.	Title	Length
1.	"Home"	4:07
2.	"Waved On"	5:21
3.	"New Horizons"	4:54
4.	"Forgiveness"	3:39
5.	"Let's Just See"	4:20
6.	"Come In Out of the Rain"	4:04
7.	"Peter Street"	1:23
8.	"Said and Done"	4:49
9.	"Thrasher"	3:52
10.	"How Do You Say Goodbye?"	5:19
11.	"One in Seven"	7:45

Japanese CD bonus tracks
No.	Title	Length
12.	"Stake to Glory"	4:45
13.	"Cats of Justice"	4:04

== Singles ==
- "Forgiveness" (21 February 2005)
- CD (ECSCD159)
  1. "Forgiveness"
  2. "Stake to Glory"
  3. "Cats of Justice"
- 7" vinyl (ECS159)
  1. "Forgiveness"
  2. "Cats of Justice"
- "Home" (13 June 2005)
- Netherlands CD EP (113.0166.179)
  1. "Home"
  2. "Home" (Jagz Kooner Funhouse Remix)
  3. "Home" (Mogwai Wazzap Remix)
  4. "Home" (U-MYX enhanced section)
  5. "Home" (enhanced video)
  - Released as a digital download only in the UK. Originally planned for 7" (ECS166) and CD (ECSCD166); was released in the Netherlands by Play It Again Sam.

== Credits ==
- All songs produced by Engineers, except:
  - "Home" produced by Engineers, with additional production by Kevin Bacon and Jonathan Quarmby for Manna Productions.
  - "Forgiveness" produced by Kevin Bacon and Jonathan Quarmby, with additional production by Engineers.
  - "Waved On" produced by Engineers and Tim Holmes.
  - "Peter Street" produced by Mark Peters
- All tracks mixed by David Bascombe, except:
  - "Home" and "Forgiveness" mixed by Kevin Bacon and Jonathan Quarmby.
  - "New Horizons" and "Thrasher" mixed by Dan MacBean and Mark Peters
  - "Peter Street" mixed by Mark Peters
- Art direction and design by Simon Earith for Blue Source; original artwork by David Thorpe.
