= New Routes out of Innerland =

Remix album by Mark Peters
- Released: 19 April 2019
- Studio: York, Wigan
- Genre: Indietronica; ambient techno
- Length: 48:22
- Label: Sonic Cathedral
- Producer: Mark Peters

Mark Peters chronology
Innerland (2017)	New Routes out of Innerland (2019)

Professional ratings
Review scores
Source	Rating
AllMusic	3.5/5 stars
Concrete Islands	(favourable)
Crackle Feedback	4/5 stars

New Routes out of Innerland is a follow-up reworking of Mark Peters' debut solo album, Innerland. Released on 19 April 2019, it comprises all eight original album tracks, reworked by artists including Ulrich Schnauss, Brian Case and Odd Nosdam. It is referenced as Peters' "final visit" to his debut solo album, and was released on CD, digital and green vinyl. The album sees Peters "looking outwards, away from the bleak, post-industrial landscapes of Wigan, and inviting eight different artists from around the world to interpret and translate the instrumentals of Innerland into their own musical and geographical languages."

== Track listing ==
No.	Title	Length
1.	"Twenty Bridges (Andi Otto Remix)"	7:02
2.	"Mann Island (Olga Wojciechowska Rework)"	5:00
3.	"Windy Arbour (Brian Case Remix)"	6:35
4.	"May Mill (Ulrich Schnauss Remix)"	5:27
5.	"Gabriel’s Ladder (Moon Gangs Remix)"	6:12
6.	"Shaley Brow (Odd Nosdam Remix)"	7:00
7.	"Cabin Hill (E Ruscha V Remix)"	4:50
8.	"Ashurst’s Beacon (Jefre Cantu-Ledesma Remix)"	6:16

== Personnel ==
=== Musicians ===
- Mark Peters: Guitar, piano, synth, programming.
- Craig Sergeant: Harmonica on 3.
- Matthew Linley: Drums on 4 and 8.

=== Producers ===
- Written, produced and mixed by Mark Peters.

=== Other personnel ===
- Mastered by Carim Clasmann.
- Design by Marc Jones.
- Navigation by Nathaniel Cramp.
