= Tomorrow Is Another Day =

"After all... tomorrow is another day", is a quotation from Gone With the Wind; it is also the title of:

- Tomorrow Is Another Day (1951 American film)
- Tomorrow Is Another Day (1951 Italian film)
- Tomorrow Is Another Day (2017 film)
- Tomorrow Is Another Day (TV series) a 2014 Hong Kong TV series
- Tomorrow Is Another Day (album)
- "Tomorrow (Is Another Day)" a dance song by Canadian musician Marc Mysterio and British singer Samantha Fox
- "Tomorrow Is Another Day", a song from Walt Disney Productions' 1977 animated musical film The Rescuers
