= Quantum Gate (album) =

Studio album by Tangerine Dream
- Released: 29 September 2017
- Recorded: August 2014–June 2017
- Length: 70:47
- Labels: Eastgate, Kscope

Tangerine Dream chronology
The Sessions I (2017)	Quantum Gate (2017)	The Sessions II (2018)

Main studio albums chronology
The Angel of the West Window (2011)	Quantum Gate (2017)	Raum (2022)

Quantum Gate is the 150th release and 30th main studio album by Tangerine Dream, released on 29 September 2017. It is the first full-length album since the death of founder Edgar Froese in 2015, and is largely based on ideas and musical sketches left by Froese. The album was preceded by and is companion to the 2015 mini-album Quantum Key.

The album earned the group the most press they had had since the release of 1988's Optical Race due to the revived interest in the group following Froese's death.

== Track listing ==
=== CD version ===
All titles composed by Edgar Froese, Thorsten Quaeschning, and Ulrich Schnauss, except where noted.

No.	Title	Length
1.	"Sensing Elements"	13:33
2.	"Roll the Seven Twice"	6:25
3.	"Granular Blankets"	5:03
4.	"It Is Time to Leave When Everyone Is Dancing" (T. Quaeschning, U. Schnauss)	6:36
5.	"Identity Proven Matrix"	5:18
6.	"Non-Locality Destination"	10:00
7.	"Proton Bonfire"	8:25
8.	"Tear Down the Grey Skies"	6:17
9.	"Genesis of Precious Thoughts"	9:10

=== LP version ===
The vinyl releases of the album feature a different track order, though this was not needed to fit the tracks onto sides.

Side one
No.	Title	Length
1.	"Sensing Elements"	13:33
2.	"Roll the Seven Twice"	6:25

Side two
No.	Title	Length
3.	"Identity Proven Matrix"	5:18
4.	"Tear Down the Grey Skies"	6:17
5.	"Proton Bonfire"	8:25

Side three
No.	Title	Length
6.	"It Is Time to Leave When Everyone Is Dancing"	6:36
7.	"Non-Locality Destination"	10:00

Side four
No.	Title	Length
8.	"Genesis of Precious Thoughts"	9:10
9.	"Granular Blankets"	5:03

== Personnel ==
- Edgar Froese – synthesizers, guitar
- Thorsten Quaeschning – musical director, synthesizers, guitar, steel drums, bass guitar
- Ulrich Schnauss – synthesizers, sequencer
- Hoshiko Yamane – violin (tracks 3, 6, 7, 8, 9)
