= Salt Rush with Mark Peters =

2016 studio album

Studio album by Salt Rush with Mark Peters
- Released: 24 June 2016
- Recorded: London, York
- Genres: Electronic, dream pop
- Length: 40:58
- Label: Pedigree Cuts
- Producers: Matthew Linley, Mark Peters

Professional ratings
Review scores
Source	Rating
The Big Takeover	(favourable)

Salt Rush with Mark Peters is the debut collaborative album by composer Matthew Linley, vocalist Maud Waret and guitarist Mark Peters of Engineers. It is the first release by the collective and was released on Pedigree Cuts (part of Warner/Chappell Production Music) on 24 June 2016 as a digital download.

== Track listing ==
No.	Title	Length
1.	"Carry On"	3:30
2.	"In Eternal"	3:16
3.	"Reveal Yourself"	2:49
4.	"Always"	3:31
5.	"Salt Rush"	4:20
6.	"Cascades"	3:39
7.	"We Summon You"	2:01
8.	"Cormorant Flying"	2:57
9.	"Ritornello"	3:37
10.	"Cross Ancient Blue"	3:16
11.	"Whomsoever"	2:49
12.	"Where Elka Lie"	2:34
13.	"Interlude"	2:39

== Personnel ==
=== Musicians ===
- Maud Waret - vocals
- Matthew Linley - synths, drums, programming
- Mark Peters - guitars, programming
- Roger Linley - bass on tracks 8 and 9

=== Producers ===
- Written and produced by Matthew Linley
- Mixed and produced by Mark Peters
