= Ron Thompson (actor) =

American actor (1941–2024)

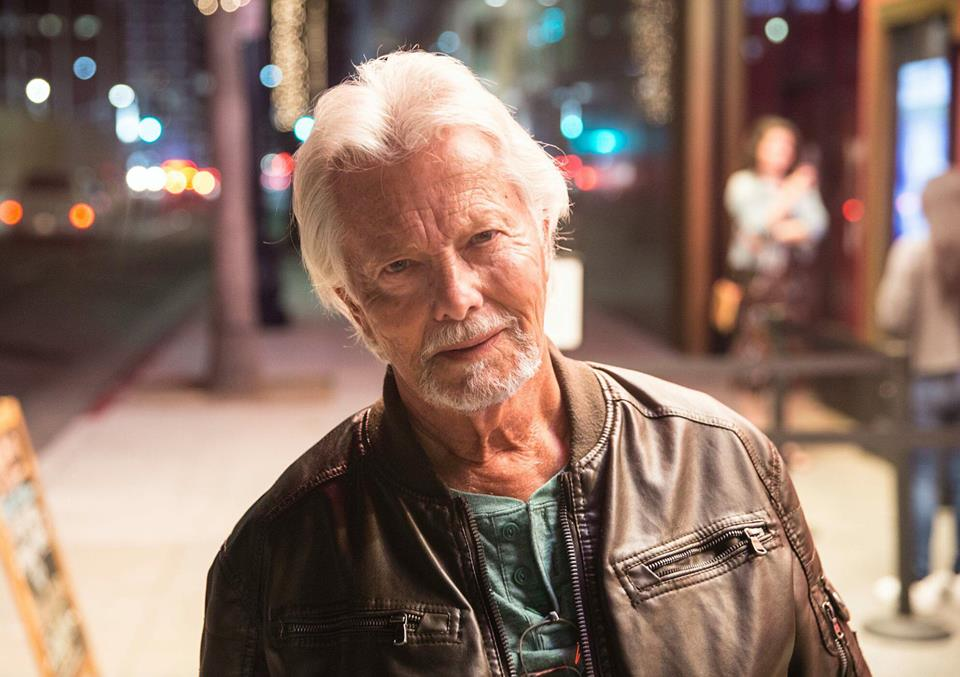
- Thompson in 2018 at the Cargo premiere
- Born: January 31, 1941; Louisville, Kentucky, U.S.
- Died: April 13, 2024 (aged 83); Van Nuys, Los Angeles, California, U.S.
- Occupations: Actor, singer, songwriter
- Years active: 1962–2023

Ron Thompson (January 31, 1941 – April 13, 2024) was an American actor and singer-songwriter.

== Life and career ==
Born in Louisville, Kentucky, Thompson was perhaps best known for his dual lead roles in Ralph Bakshi's critically acclaimed rotoscope film American Pop and the 1970s TV series Baretta in the role of Detective Nopke.

Thompson's first film appearance was as an uncredited extra in the 1960 Jerry Lewis film The Bellboy.

Thompson had a brief career as a rock singer in the 1960s and wrote and recorded a number of singles as Ronnie Thompson under the guidance of his mentor and friend, rockabilly singer Ersel Hickey.

Thompson originated the role of Shanty Mulligan in the 1969 Pulitzer Prize winning play No Place to Be Somebody by Charles Gordone. In his review for The New York Times, Mel Gussow wrote that Thompson was "splendid" in his role.

Thompson won the Los Angeles Drama Critics Circle Award for his 1973 theatre lead performance in the play Does a Tiger Wear a Necktie? A young Al Pacino had won a Tony for playing the part in 1969.

The Progress Bulletin praised Thompson's performance in the 1976 Felton Perry play Buy the Bi and Bye calling it an "offbeat and hilarious black satire with a zinging performance by Ron Thompson."

Thompson did a dramatic portrayal of Henry David Thoreau on the 1976 NBC television series The Rebels.

Thompson starred in the 2018 thriller film Cargo.

Thompson died at his apartment in Van Nuys, Los Angeles, on April 13, 2024, at the age of 83. He was found dead by filmmaker Joe Black.

== Theatre ==
| Date | Production | Role | Notes |
|---|---|---|---|
| 1969 | No Place to Be Somebody | Shanty Mulligan | |
| 1972 | The Time of Your Life | Willie | |
| 1973 | Does a Tiger Wear a Necktie? | Bickham | Los Angeles Drama Critics Circle Award (Lead Performance) |
| 1976 | Buy the Bi and Bye | WD | |

== Film ==
| Year | Film | Role | Notes |
|---|---|---|---|
| 1960 | The Bellboy | Extra | Uncredited |
| 1967 | Brown Eye, Evil Eye | Freddy St. Claire | |
| 1973 | The No Mercy Man | John Dunn | aka "The Vietnam Soldier" – Europe (English title) (video title) aka "Trained to Kill: USA" – USA (DVD title) |
| 1977 | The White Buffalo | Frozen Dog Pimp | aka "Hunt to Kill" – USA (TV title) |
| 1981 | American Pop | Tony Belinsky / Pete Belinsky | |
| 1992 | American Me | Junkie | |
| 1992 | Deep Cover | Store Owner | |
| 1993 | Death Ring | "Needles", Tattooer | |
| 1998 | Fallen Arches | Leslie | |
| 2006 | Bottleneck | Husband | |
| 2015 | Last Days of Coney Island | Cops | Voice |
| 2017 | Stitches | Ron | |
| 2017 | Hate Horses | Rex Napier | |
| 2017 | Low Town | Langston Bedry | |
| 2018 | Cargo | Anthony Peterson | |
| 2018 | Chicks, Man | Sherman | |
| 2018 | Gena | John | |
| 2019 | Tellers | Harry Dawn | |
| 2021 | Natasha Hall | Marlon Franklin | Voice |
| 2023 | Suffrage | Harry Dawn | |

== Television ==
| Year | Program | Role | Episodes | Title |
|---|---|---|---|---|
| 1962 | Armstrong Circle Theatre | Larry / Junkie | 2 | Securities for Suckers; Runaway Road-Story of a Missing Person; Assignment: Teenage Junkies; Assignment: Teenage Junkies |
| 1963 | Armstrong Circle Theatre | Junkie | 1 | Assignment: Teenage Junkies |
| 1974 | Mannix | Kirk Bullard | 1 | Death Has No Face |
| 1974 | Ironside | The Bartender | 1 | Amy Prentiss: Part 1 |
| 1974 | Ironside | Jamie | 1 | Run Scared |
| 1974 | The Gun | Tom | TV movie | |
| 1975 | The Dream Makers | Dave | TV movie | |
| 1975 | The Streets of San Francisco | Willie | 1 | Web of Lies |
| 1975 | Bronk | Barrow | 1 | Crackback |
| 1975–1976 | Baretta | Penguin / Detective Nopke | 6 | Count the Days I'm Gone; Murder For Me; Pay or Die; The Dippers; Death on the Run; Street Edition |
| 1976 | The Rebels | Henry David Thoreau | 1 | Henry David Thoreau |
| 1977 | Quincy, M.E. | Claude Stern | 1 | The Thigh Bone's Connected to the Knee Bone |
| 1980 | The Waltons | GI | 1 | The Prodigals |
| 1982 | The Greatest American Hero | Guard | 1 | Good Samaritan |
| 1985 | Cagney & Lacey | Jimmy MacDonald | 1 | Organized Crime |
| 1989 | Imagining America | Beatnik Poet | 1 | This Ain't Bebop |
| 1997 | Crisis Center | Junkie | 1 | He Said, She Said |
| 2020 | Ethnically Ambiguous | Ralph | 1 | Asian Persuasion |
