= Underrated Silence =

Studio album by Ulrich Schnauss & Mark Peters
- Released: 3 February 2012
- Recorded: York, London
- Genres: Indietronica, ambient techno
- Length: 48:38
- Label: Bureau B
- Producers: Ulrich Schnauss & Mark Peters

Ulrich Schnauss & Mark Peters chronology
Underrated Silence (2012)	Tomorrow Is Another Day (2013)

Professional ratings
Review scores
Source	Rating
Drowned in Sound	7/10 stars
The Line of Best Fit	(favourable)
Q Magazine	4/5 stars
Q Magazine	3.5/5 stars
The Times	4/5 stars

Underrated Silence is the debut collaborative release by German electronic musician Ulrich Schnauss and Engineers' Mark Peters, released on 3 February 2012 through Bureau B.

== Track listing ==
No.	Title	Length
1.	"The Messiah Is Falling"	3:39
2.	"Long Distance Call"	2:47
3.	"Forgotten"	4:08
4.	"Yesterday Didn't Exist"	5:22
5.	"Rosen im Asphalt"	5:29
6.	"The Child or the Pigeon"	3:38
7.	"Ekaterina"	5:22
8.	"Amoxicillin"	4:14
9.	"Gift Horse's Mouth"	7:14
10.	"Underrated Silence"	6:45
11.	"Balcony Sunset (iTunes bonus song)"	4:44

== Personnel ==
=== Musicians ===
- Ulrich Schnauss: Synthesizer, piano.
- Mark Peters: Guitar, bass.
- Judith Beck: Guitar on "Forgotten," vocals on "Long Distance Call" and "Forgotten".

=== Producers ===
- Produced and mixed by Mark Peters and Ulrich Schnauss at home in York and London respectively.
- Mastering by Tom Durack.

== Other appearances ==
- "Balcony Sunset" also appeared on the charity album for the Japan earthquake of 2011 For Nihon which was released on Helios' Keith Kenniff's label Unseen. The album featured acts such as Robin Guthrie and Harold Budd, Jon Hopkins, Ryuichi Sakamoto and Max Richter.
