= Buy the Bi and Bye =

American theatrical production

- Written by: Felton Perry
- Original language: English
- Genre: Satire
- Setting: Theater

Premiere
- Date premiered: 1976
- Place premiered: Los Angeles, California, United States

Buy the Bi and Bye is an American play written by Felton Perry that was first staged in 1976 at the Actor's Theater in Los Angeles, California.

== Plot ==
A group of mostly black actors gather at a theater to read through a fictional play called Killing Flo by a white writer-director with schizophrenia.

== Reception ==
The Progress Bulletin newspaper praised the 1976 premiere staging of the play calling it an "offbeat and hilarious black satire with a zinging performance by Ron Thompson."

When the play was later performed in 1986 the Los Angeles Times wrote "The voice of a keenly observant satirist is heard throughout "Buy the Bi and Bye," at the Richmond Shepard. Yet Felton Perry's play isn't as sharp as it must have been 10 years ago at Los Angeles Actors' Theatre."
