= Far Away Trains Passing By =

Studio album by Ulrich Schnauss
- Released: 14 November 2001
- Genres: Electronic, downtempo, trip hop
- Length: 43:21
- Label: City Centre Offices
- Producer: Ulrich Schnauss

Ulrich Schnauss chronology
Far Away Trains Passing By (2001)	A Strangely Isolated Place (2003)

Singles from Far Away Trains Passing By
- 1. "...Passing By" Released: 15 August 2006

Professional ratings
Review scores
Source	Rating
AllMusic	4/5 stars
Entertainment Weekly	A−
Muzik	5/5
Pitchfork	6.9/10

Far Away Trains Passing By is the debut studio album by German electronic musician Ulrich Schnauss, released on 14 November 2001 by City Centre Offices.

Domino Recording Company reissued Far Away Trains Passing By with a second disc of six bonus tracks on 1 November 2005. On 13 October 2008, Independiente issued a remastered edition of the album with an extra disc containing the same bonus tracks, along with the track "A Million Miles Away". Far Away Trains Passing By was remastered again in 2019 for a new reissue, which was released on 3 April 2020 by Scripted Realities; this reissue features the aforementioned seven bonus tracks, along with the tracks "Brooks Was Here" and "A Lie for Breakfast".

== Track listing ==
All tracks are written by Ulrich Schnauss, except where noted.

No.	Title	Length
1.	"Knuddelmaus"	7:01
2.	"Between Us and Them"	7:29
3.	"...Passing By"	6:35
4.	"Blumenwiese neben Autobahn"	6:33
5.	"Nobody's Home"	7:36
6.	"Molfsee"	8:07
Total length:		43:21

2005 reissue bonus disc
No.	Title	Writer(s)	Length
1.	"Sunday Evening in Your Street"		6:45
2.	"Suddenly the Trees Are Giving Way"		6:22
3.	"Nothing Happens in June"		6:17
4.	"As If You've Never Been Away"		7:00
5.	"Crazy For You"	Neil Halstead	6:32
6.	"Wherever You Are"		6:37
Total length:			39:33

2008 reissue bonus disc
No.	Title	Writer(s)	Length
1.	"Sunday Evening in Your Street"		6:45
2.	"Suddenly the Trees Are Giving Way"		6:22
3.	"Nothing Happens in June"		6:17
4.	"As If You've Never Been Away"		7:00
5.	"A Million Miles Away"		7:09
6.	"Crazy for You"	Halstead	6:32
7.	"Wherever You Are"		6:37
Total length:			46:42

2020 reissue bonus disc
No.	Title	Writer(s)	Length
1.	"Brooks Was Here"		7:09
2.	"Sunday Evening in Your Street"		6:45
3.	"Suddenly the Trees Are Giving Way"		6:22
4.	"A Lie for Breakfast"		6:09
5.	"Nothing Happens in June"		6:17
6.	"As If You've Never Been Away"		7:00
7.	"A Million Miles Away"		7:09
8.	"Crazy for You"	Halstead	6:32
9.	"Wherever You Are"		6:37
Total length:			60:00

== Personnel ==
Credits are adapted from the album's liner notes.

- Ulrich Schnauss – production
- Artificial Duck Flavour – cover design
- Markus Knothe – photography
- Loop-O – mastering
