= A Strangely Isolated Place =

Studio album by Ulrich Schnauss
- Released: 9 June 2003
- Genres: Ambient; shoegaze
- Length: 61:49
- Label: City Centre Offices
- Producer: Ulrich Schnauss

Ulrich Schnauss chronology
Far Away Trains Passing By (2001)	A Strangely Isolated Place (2003)	Quicksand Memory EP (2007)

A Strangely Isolated Place is the second studio album by German electronic musician Ulrich Schnauss, released on 9 June 2003 by City Centre Offices. It was released in the United States on 5 October 2004 by Domino Recording Company.

On 13 October 2008, a remastered edition of A Strangely Isolated Place was issued by Independiente. The album was remastered again in 2019 for a new reissue, which was released on 17 April 2020 by Scripted Realities.

== Critical reception ==
Professional ratings
Review scores
Source	Rating
AllMusic	5/5 stars
Muzik	5/5 stars
Pitchfork	7.6/10
Stylus Magazine	7.5/10

Resident Advisor named A Strangely Isolated Place the 37th best album of the 2000s, describing it as "ambient music with enough oomph to keep the club kids happy." In 2016, Pitchfork ranked the record at number 31 on its list of the 50 best shoegaze albums of all time.

== Track listing ==
All tracks are written by Ulrich Schnauss.

No.	Title	Length
1.	"Gone Forever"	8:12
2.	"On My Own"	6:41
3.	"A Letter from Home"	6:57
4.	"Monday – Paracetamol"	7:57
5.	"Clear Day"	7:42
6.	"Blumenthal"	6:38
7.	"In All the Wrong Places"	6:53
8.	"A Strangely Isolated Place"	10:49
Total length:		61:49

2008 reissue and 2020 CD reissue bonus tracks
No.	Title	Length
9.	"Gone Forever" (Robin Guthrie remix)	5:45
10.	"On My Own" (Robin Guthrie remix)	6:55
Total length:		74:29

== Personnel ==
Credits are adapted from the album's liner notes.

- Ulrich Schnauss – production
- Aesthetic Investments – cover design
- Judith Beck – vocals
- Paul Davis – guitar
- Markus Knothe – photography
- Loop-O – mastering
