= The Dream Makers =

- Genre: Drama; Music
- Written by: Bill Svanoe
- Directed by: Boris Sagal
- Starring: James Franciscus; Diane Baker; John Astin; Ron Thompson; Kenny Rogers; Mickey Jones; Michael Lerner; Katey Sagal
- Music by: Fred Karlin
- Country of origin: United States
- Original language: English

Production
- Executive producer: Charles Robert McLain
- Producer: Boris Sagal
- Production locations: Metro-Goldwyn-Mayer Studios - 10202 W. Washington Blvd., Culver City, California
- Cinematography: Howard Schwartz
- Editor: Jim Benson
- Running time: 90 min.
- Production company: MGM Television

Original release
- Network: NBC
- Release: January 7, 1975

The Dream Makers is a 1975 American made-for-television drama film starring James Franciscus, Diane Baker, John Astin, Ron Thompson, Kenny Rogers and directed by Boris Sagal. It aired on January 7, 1975 on the NBC television network.

== Plot ==
A university professor launches a career in the music industry, eventually running his own record label. To ensure radio stations play run his recording artists' music he illegally pays off deejays and in doing so, runs the risk of destroying what he's built.

== Cast ==
- James Franciscus as Sammy Stone
- Diane Baker as Mary Stone
- John Astin as Manny Wheeler
- Kenny Rogers as Earl
- Mickey Jones as Jesse
- Jamie Donnelly as Sally
- Devon Ericson as Carol
- Steven Keats as Barry
- Michael Lerner as Mike
- Ron Thompson as Dave
- John Lupton as Dean Halder
- Lois Walden as Jo
- Erica Yohn as Helen
- Ron Rifkin as Herb

== Reception ==
Steven Puchalski wrote on Shock Cinema:

A boring, middle-class family man gets addicted to the fast-paced world of the music industry in this generic NBC made-for-TV movie by director Boris Sagal (The Failing of Raymond, A Case of Rape). Since the script was written by someone with first-hand knowledge of the record biz -- Bill Svanoe, from the folk trio The Rooftop Singers, who had a Number One hit in 1963 with Walk Right In -- you might've thought he'd come up with something more insightful than this heavyhanded rise-and-fall hogwash....

[When] Sammy is sacked for allegations involving drugs and kickbacks, his out-of-control ego is determined to find a way back on top, possibly with the help of a hungry new band dubbed Cat Weazel (Kenny Rogers and The First Edition, just before they broke up and Rogers went solo). Sammy is persona non grata though, with every shot at a fresh start quickly quashed and the leaden script explicitly informing us that Sammy is "hooked on power like a junkie," until this delusional dude hits rock bottom...

Every single aspect of this shallow cautionary tale feels artificial, from Sammy's nearly-overnight success to the non-stop string of cliches he slams into on the way down.

== See also ==
- List of American films of 1975
