= Innerland =

Studio album by Mark Peters
- Released: 1 December 2017
- Studio: York, Wigan
- Genre: Indietronica; ambient techno
- Length: 34:37
- Label: Sonic Cathedral
- Producer: Mark Peters

Mark Peters chronology
Innerland (2017)	New Routes out of Innerland (2019)

Professional ratings
Review scores
Source	Rating
Caught By The River	(favourable)
musicOMH	4/5 stars
The Arts Desk	4/5 stars
Crackle Feedback	8/10 stars
Get Into This	(favourable)
dmcworld magazine	5/5 stars
Bearded Magazine	8/10 stars

Innerland comprises the debut solo recordings by Mark Peters. Initially released in December 2017 (on limited-edition cassette and packaged as a replica mini Ordnance Survey Landranger, with outer slipcase and an imaginary map) it was given a comprehensive (Vinyl/Cd/digital) release with two extra tracks ‘May Mill’ and ‘Gabriel’s Ladder’ in April 2018, as well as a limited-edition version with a bonus disc entitled Ambient Innerland, which includes reworked versions of the full extended album. The songs on the album are inspired by memories of places near where Peters grew up.

== Track listing ==
No.	Title	Length
1.	"Twenty Bridges"	4:36
2.	"Mann Island"	4:41
3.	"Windy Arbour"	4:35
4.	"May Mill"	4:57
5.	"Gabriel's Ladder"	3:10
6.	"Shaley Brow"	4:01
7.	"Cabin Hill"	3:53
8.	"Ashurst's Beacon"	4:44

== Personnel ==
=== Musicians ===
- Mark Peters: Guitar, piano, synth, programming.
- Craig Sergeant: Harmonica on 3.
- Matthew Linley: Drums on 4 and 8.

=== Producers ===
- Written, produced and mixed by Mark Peters.

=== Other personnel ===
- Design by Marc Jones.
