= Dream Brother: The Songs of Tim and Jeff Buckley =

Dream Brother: Songs of Tim and Jeff Buckley

Studio album by Various Artists
- Released: January 31, 2006
- Genre: Folk, Rock, Pop
- Label: Full Time Hobby, Rykodisc
- Producer: Kathyrn Williams, David Scott, Romeo Stodart

Professional ratings
Review scores
Source	Rating
Allmusic	3.5/5 stars
Pitchfork Media	(7.0/10)
Rolling Stone	2/5 stars

Dream Brother: The Songs of Tim and Jeff Buckley is a studio album performed by various artists in tribute to 1960s musician Tim Buckley, and his son, also a musician, Jeff Buckley. Both father and son died prematurely, Tim Buckley of an overdose and Jeff Buckley in a drowning accident.

== Track listing ==
1. "Sing a Song for You" (Tim Buckley) performed by The Magic Numbers - 3:27
2. "Yard of Blonde Girls" (Audrey Clark, Lori Kramer) performed by Micah P. Hinson - 2:58
3. "She Is" (Tim Buckley, Larry Beckett) performed by Sufjan Stevens - 2:22
4. "Grace" (Jeff Buckley, Gary Lucas) performed by King Creosote - 5:34
5. "I Must Have Been Blind" (Tim Buckley) performed by The Earlies - 5:18
6. "Dream Brother" (Jeff Buckley) performed by Bitmap - 4:52
7. "Song to the Siren" (Tim Buckley, Larry Beckett) performed by Engineers - 4:32
8. "Mojo Pin" (Jeff Buckley, Gary Lucas) performed by Adem - 5:05
9. "No Man Can Find the War" (Tim Buckley, Larry Beckett) performed by Tunng - 5:03
10. "Morning Theft" (Jeff Buckley) performed by Stephen Fretwell - 3:41
11. "Buzzin' Fly" (Tim Buckley) performed by Kathryn Williams - 4:07
12. "Everybody Here Wants You" (Jeff Buckley) performed by Matthew Herbert, Dani Siciliano - 4:48
13. "The River" (Tim Buckley) performed by Clayhill - 5:54

== Personnel ==
- "Sing a Song for You" -The Magic Numbers
- "Yard of Blonde Girls" - Micah P. Hinson
- "She Is" - Sufjan Stevens
- "Grace" - King Creosote
- "I Must Have Been Blind" - The Earlies
- "Dream Brother" - Bitmap
- "Song to the Siren" - Engineers
- "Mojo Pin" - Adem
- "No Man Can Find the War" - Tunng
- "Morning Theft" - Stephen Fretwell: Bass guitar, guitar, percussion, vocals
- "Buzzin' Fly" - Kathryn Williams
- "Everybody Here Wants You" - Matthew Herbert, Dani Siciliano
- "The River" - Clayhill
- Matthew Watson - Piano, wurlitzer
- Tom Knott - Engineer
- Richard Wilkinson - Engineer, Mixing
- David Browne - Liner Notes
- David Scott - Producer
- Kathyrn Williams - Producer
- Romeo Stodart - Producer
