= Wahoola! =

Studio album by Matthew Gilbert Linley
- Released: December 1, 2010
- Recorded: London, 2008 - 2010
- Genre: Dream pop, electronica, folktronica
- Length: 36:08
- Producer: Matthew Gilbert Linley

Wahoola! is the second full-length studio album by London-based composer/producer Matthew Gilbert Linley, and was released in December 2010.

== Track listing ==
| No. | Title | Length |
|---|---|---|
| 1. | "It's All So Bright" | 3:48 |
| 2. | "Where (Are You)?" | 3:59 |
| 3. | "Snow Snow Snow Snow Snow" | 5:19 |
| 4. | "Red Leaves Floating On The Water" | 4:27 |
| 5. | "Wahoola!" | 4:47 |
| 6. | "So Far Away" | 4:45 |
| 7. | "Blow The Trumpets" | 4:25 |
| 8. | "Let's Go Away" | 4:38 |

== Personnel ==
=== Musicians ===
- Matthew Gilbert Linley: Synths, organs, celeste and piano, drums and percussion.
- Maud Waret: Vocals.
- Roger Linley: Double bass, bass guitar.
- Kenny Paterson: Bass guitar on 1 and 8.
- Brian Lee: Violin, spoken word on 5.
- Geoff Irwin: Viola.
- Masumi Yamamoto: Harpsichord.
- Kai Hoffman: French horn.
- Feargal Murray: Flugel Horn, backing vocals on 8.
- Lettie Maclean: Vocals on 8.
- Ruby Aspinall: Harp.
- Rhodri Davies: Harp on 2 and 8.
- Paul Bishop: Banjo.
- Jeanine Moss: Flute.

=== Production ===
- Recorded and produced by Matthew Gilbert Linley in London, except:
- Drums recorded at Goldtop Studios.
- Mixed in London by Kenny Paterson.
- Mastered by Duncan Cowell at Sound Mastering London.
