= Hoshiko Yamane =

Japanese violinist (born 1981)

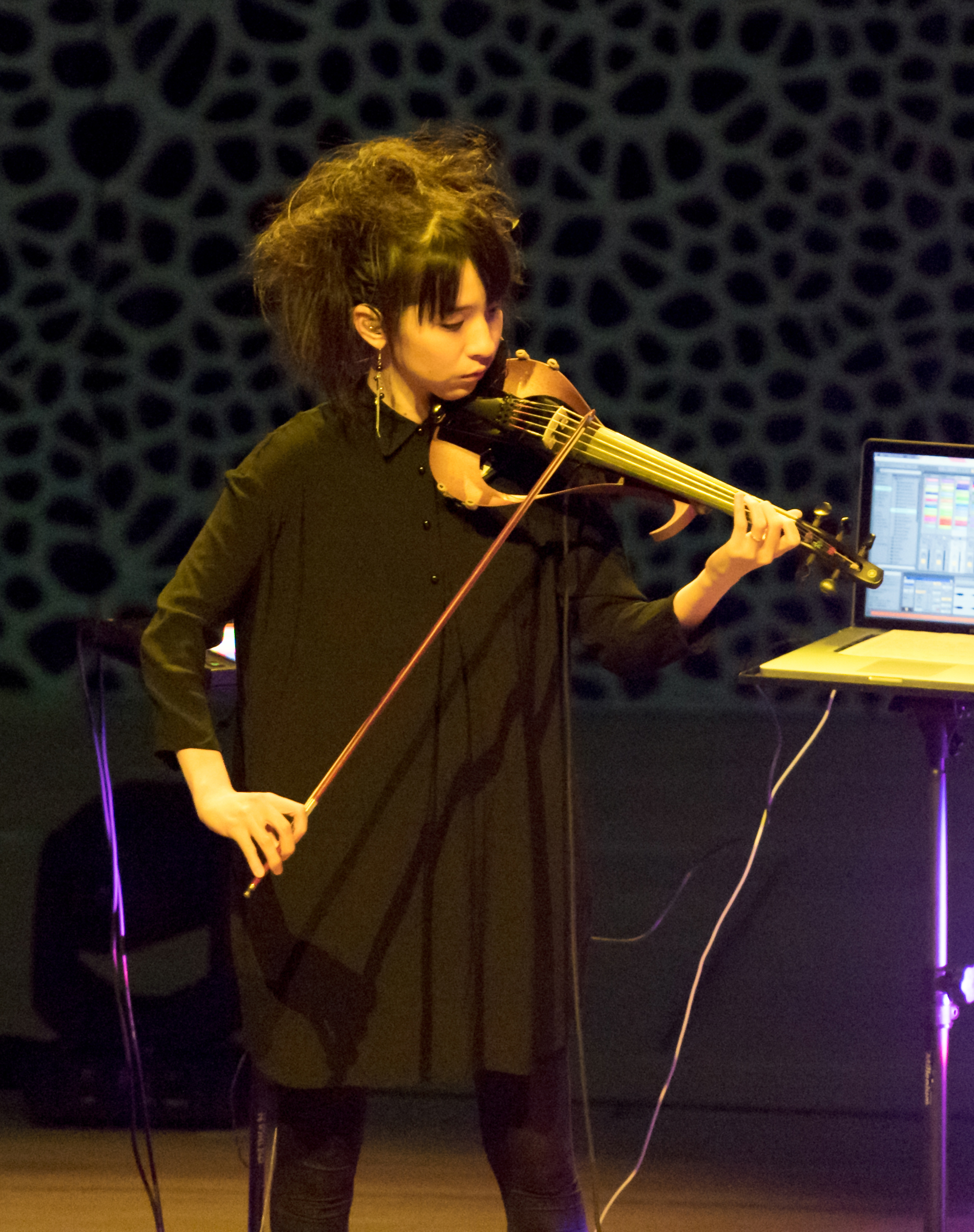

Background information
- Born: 4 April 1981 (age 45); Osaka, Japan
- Genres: Electronic; ambient; experimental
- Occupations: Composer, musician
- Instruments: Violin; Ableton Push; cello; synthesizers; viola
- Member of: Tangerine Dream, Tukico (solo project)
- Website: hoshikoyamane.com

Hoshiko Yamane (山根星子, Yamane Hoshiko; born 4 April 1981) is a Japanese violinist, composer and performer based in Berlin. She has been a member of Tangerine Dream since 2011.

== Biography ==
Born in Osaka, Yamane attended the University of Arts in Aichi. Her training destined her to be a violinist in classical music, but she extended her practice to modern music and later to pop music. She moved to Europe to further study in Berlin and Rostock, finally relocating in Berlin.

In 2009 she started an experimental contemporary dance and live music project, Tansik, with dancer Chizu Kimura. The group produced e.g. the plays "~ing" in 2012 and "Discord" in 2016.

In 2011 she joined the band Tangerine Dream.

In 2013 she started a solo project, Tukico, with a debut performance at Madame Claude, Berlin, in 2014. She pairs up with Jürgen Heidemann in KiSeki (木石), producing experimental music with the sound of wood (木, wood of a violin, played by Yamane) and stones (石, stones, played by Heidemann). ("Kiseki" is a pun on 奇跡 (kiseki) which means "miracle" in Japanese.) She often toured as a violinist with Jane Birkin and other Japanese musicians. She composes and plays with the Berlin-based Motimaru Dance Company.

In 2017 she performed on the Cargo original motion picture soundtrack composed by Thorsten Quaeschning of Tangerine Dream.

== Discography (partial) ==
- 2014: KiSeki: Traumstein
- 2015: Tukico: SD card [Regen from Ame] (video works)
- 2016: Hoshiko Yamane/Tansik: Discord (dance soundtrack)
- 2017: Hoshiko Yamane: MUT (dance soundtrack)
- 2017: Hoshiko Yamane/Duenn: Nakaniwa
- 2017: Hoshiko Yamane: A Story of a Man EP
- 2018: Hoshiko Yamane: Threads
- 2018: Hoshiko Yamane: Twilight EP (dance soundtrack)

== Tangerine Dream (partial) ==
- 2011: Live at the Lowry (The Gate of Saturn, live at the Lowry, Manchester)
- 2011: Knights of Asheville (live in Asheville)
- 2011: The Island of the Fay (guest on track 4)
- 2011: The Angel of the West Window (plays on 3 tracks)
- 2015: Supernormal – The Australian Concerts 2014
- 2015: Quantum Key
- 2016: Live at The Philharmony Szczecin – Poland
- 2016: Particles
- 2017: The Sessions I
- 2017: Light Flux
- 2017: Quantum Gate
- 2018: The Sessions II
- 2018: The Sessions III
- 2018: The Sessions IV
- 2019: The Sessions V
- 2019: Recurring Dreams
- 2020: The Sessions VI
- 2021: The Sessions VII
- 2021: Probe 6-8
- 2022: Raum
- 2022: From Virgin to Quantum Years - Coventry Cathedral 22
- 2025: 50 Years of Phaedra: At The Barbican
