= Tomorrow Is Another Day (album) =

Studio album by Ulrich Schnauss & Mark Peters
- Released: 25 October 2013
- Recorded: York, London
- Genres: Indietronica, ambient techno
- Length: 48:51
- Label: Bureau B
- Producers: Ulrich Schnauss & Mark Peters

Ulrich Schnauss & Mark Peters chronology
| Underrated Silence (2012) | Tomorrow Is Another Day (2013) |

Professional ratings
Review scores
| Source | Rating |
|---|---|
| A Strangely Isolated Place | (favourable) |
| Norman Records | 10/10 stars |
| Q Magazine | 4/5 stars |

Tomorrow Is Another Day is the second collaborative release by German electronic musician Ulrich Schnauss and Engineers' Mark Peters, released on 25 October 2013 through Bureau B.

== Track listing ==
| No. | Title | Length |
|---|---|---|
| 1. | "Slow Southern Skies" | 4:17 |
| 2. | "Tomorrow Is Another Day" | 3:37 |
| 3. | "Das Volk Hat Keine Seele" | 5:04 |
| 4. | "Inconvenient Truths" | 5:27 |
| 5. | "One Finger And Someone Else's Chords" | 4:12 |
| 6. | "Additional Ghosts" | 4:45 |
| 7. | "Walking With My Eyes Closed" | 5:39 |
| 8. | "Rosmarine" | 4:10 |
| 9. | "Bound By Lies" | 6:05 |
| 10. | "There's Always Tomorrow" | 5:35 |

== Personnel ==
=== Musicians ===
- Ulrich Schnauss: Synthesizer, piano, vocals.
- Mark Peters: Guitar, bass, vocals.

=== Producers ===
- Produced and mixed by Mark Peters and Ulrich Schnauss at home in York and London respectively.
- Mastering by Bo Kondron at Calyx Mastering, Berlin.

== Other appearances ==
- "There's Always Tomorrow" from the album also appeared on the compilation album 'Possibilities of Circumstance' on Projekt which features acts such as Steve Roach and Hans Joachim Roedelius.
