= Gilbert (band) =

- Born: Matthew Gilbert Linley
- Origin: London, England
- Occupation: Musician
- Instrument(s): Drums, keyboard
- Labels: Shifty Disco, Pedigree Cuts
- Website: Soundcloud.com/gilbertlinley

Gilbert is the performance name of Matthew Gilbert Linley, a London-based composer and musician. He is also the drummer in Engineers with Mark Peters and Ulrich Schnauss.

== Biography ==
He began playing the drums at an early age and then went on to study classical music and composition at Oriel College, Oxford University and Goldsmiths College. After a period of writing soundtracks for film and television he began writing under the Gilbert moniker.

Gilbert's eponymous debut album was released in 2007 on the independent record label Shifty Disco Records. It received excellent reviews and extensive national radio airplay.

In 2010, Gilbert's album Wahoola! was released. About the new record Linley wrote: "I wanted Wahoola! to more obviously feature the talents of the people who have been performing the first album live.....especially Maud Waret's vocals and Brian Lee's violin-playing".

2014 saw a new album and musical project named AztecCormorant.

In 2016, Linley collaborated with bandmate from Engineers, Mark Peters, on a new album and project entitled Salt Rush with Mark Peters. This album was released by the record label Pedigree Cuts (part of Warner/Chappell Production Music)

Gilbert's music is performed live by five musicians playing an array of musical instruments. Gilbert has gigged extensively throughout the UK, including sets at the 2007 Green Man Festival, 2008 Brighton Loop, and 2009 Southbank Udderbelly. Gilbert also supported Mice Parade and Silje Nes in London, in October 2010.
