= Madrid (band) =

- Origin: Toronto, Ontario, Canada
- Genres: Electronic
- Years active: 2003–present
- Labels: YYZ Records; Awesome Music
- Members: Adam Perry; Duncan Christie; Eric Lightfoot

Madrid is a Canadian electronic music group from Toronto, Ontario. The band consists of Adam Perry (guitars, keys, vox), Duncan Christie (bass, keys, vox) and Eric Lightfoot (drums). Their music is a combination of Electro, Shoegaze, and Psychedelia.

== History ==
Perry and Christie, two friends from Niagara Falls, Ontario, began creating songs and electronic music together. They formed Madrid in 2003 and added Lightfoot when they began playing live in Toronto clubs and bars. That year the group released their debut album, Warm Waters, on record label Aporia. The album, which featured analogue synthesizer music, was featured on the BBC music website. After four years, Madrid released an EP, First Message.

The band's first single, "Reply (To Everyone)" was released in mp3 format as a free download in 2009. Their work was remixed by Ulrich Schnauss, vitaminsforyou, The Cansecos, and dubstep-impresario XI. In November 2009, they toured across Canada with DJ Champion & His G-Strings.

In 2011, they performed in Toronto as part of Canada Music Week. In March that year, the band released their full-length recording, Original Message on Awesome Music and distributed by EMI Records.

== Discography ==
- 2003 Warm Waters
- 2007 First Message (EP)
- 2011 Original Message
