= Felton Perry =

American actor

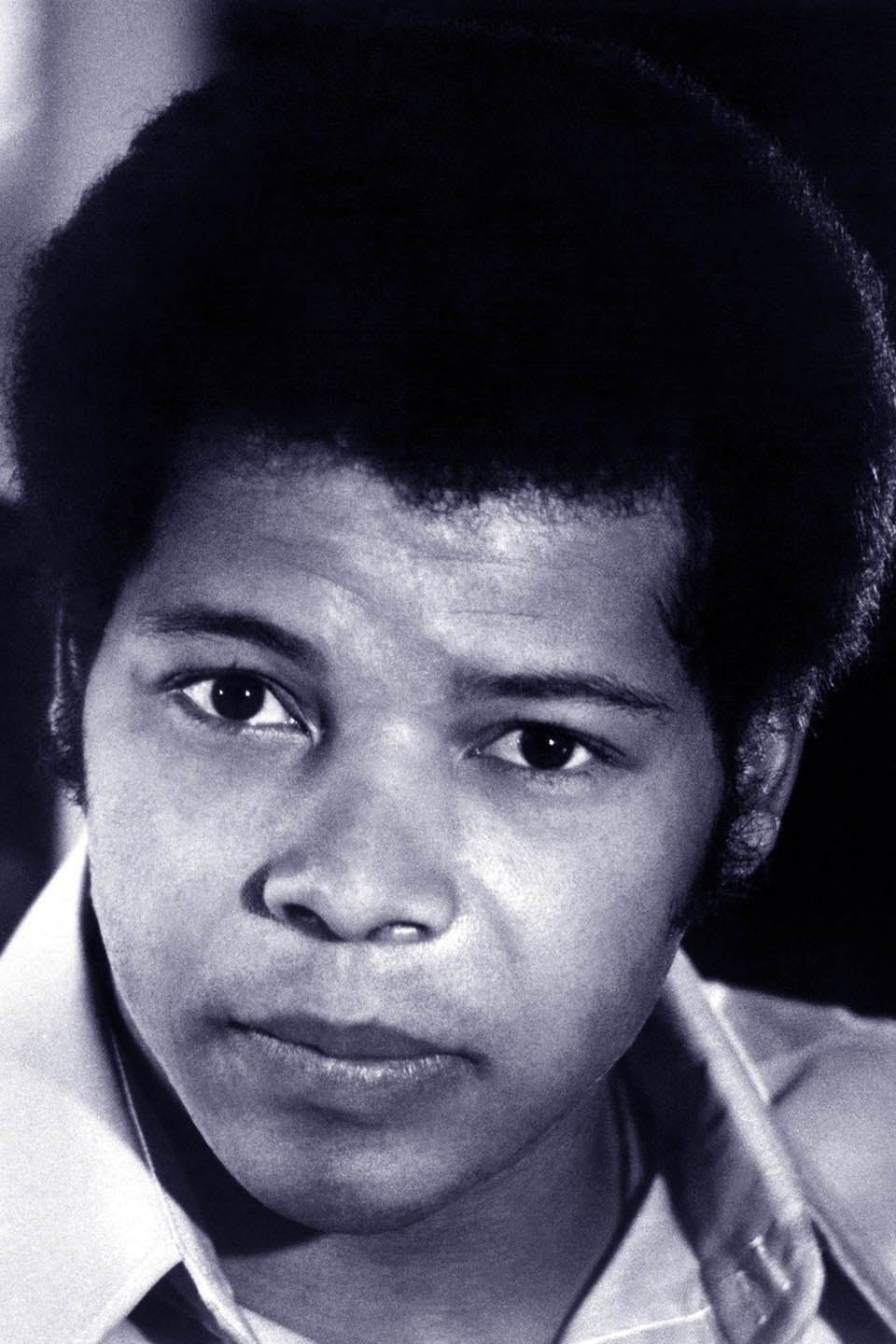
- Born: September 11, 1945 (age 80); Chicago, Illinois, U.S.
- Occupations: Actor; playwright
- Years active: 1968–2007
- Website: feltonperry.com

Felton Perry (born September 11, 1945) is a retired American actor. He is most notable for his roles as Deputy Obrah Eaker in the 1973 movie Walking Tall, and as Inspector Early Smith in the 1973 movie Magnum Force, the second film in the Dirty Harry series. Felton's other well-known role is in the 1987 science fiction movie RoboCop as Donald Johnson, an executive at the corporation Omni Consumer Products (OCP). He reprised his role as Johnson in the sequels RoboCop 2 (1990) and RoboCop 3 (1993).

Perry is also a playwright known for such plays as Buy the Bi and Bye which in 1976 the Progress Bulletin called an "offbeat and hilarious black satire with a zinging performance by Ron Thompson."

== Career ==
A life member of the Actors Studio, Felton starred on the television show Hooperman as Inspector Clarence McNeil. He has made guest appearances on many TV series, including 227, Adam-12, Ironside, Hill Street Blues, L.A. Law, Cagney and Lacey, What's Happening Now!!, Mannix, The Partridge Family, Barnaby Jones, The Fresh Prince of Bel-Air, N.Y.P.D. Blue, Judging Amy, Civil Wars, Murphy Brown, Stingray, Marcus Welby, M.D., Sports Night and The West Wing.

He has also voiced characters in animation including the feature film The Nine Lives of Fritz the Cat and the children's television series A Pup Named Scooby-Doo.

== Partial filmography ==
- Medium Cool (1969) – Black Militant
- Brute Corps (1971) – Hill
- Night Call Nurses (1972) – Jude
- Trouble Man (1972) – Bobby Golden
- Walking Tall (1973) – Deputy Obrah Eaker
- Magnum Force (1973) – Inspector Early Smith
- The Nine Lives of Fritz the Cat (1974) – (voice)
- The Towering Inferno (1974) – SFFD Firefighter Scott
- Sudden Death (1977) – Wyatt Spain
- Mean Dog Blues (1978) – Jake Turner
- Down and Out in Beverly Hills (1986) – Al
- RoboCop (1987) – Donald Johnson
- Weeds (1987) – Associate Warden
- Checking Out (1989) – Dr. Duffin
- RoboCop 2 (1990) – Donald Johnson
- Talent for the Game (1991) – Fred
- Perfume (1991) – Freddy
- Let's Kill All the Lawyers (1992) – Cyrus
- RoboCop 3 (1993) – Donald Johnson
- Relentless 3 (1993) – Detective Ziskie
- Puppet Master 4 (1993) – Dr. Carl Baker
- Dumb & Dumber (1994) – Detective Dale
- Dark Breed (1996) – Astronaut Bill Powell
- Buck and the Magic Bracelet (1999) – Shanka
- Hollywood Vampyr (2002) – Professor Chiles
- The Members (2007) – Mjaji
- Robodoc: The Creation of Robocop (Documentary) (2023) – Himself

=== Television appearances ===
- Room 222 (1969) – E.M. Farmer
- Ironside (1969–1973) – Gilbert Loggins / Roger Stewart / Mustafa / Charlie Tattersall
- Dragnet (1970) – Howie Frazer
- Julia (1970) – Jerome
- Nanny and the Professor (1970) – Fred
- O'Hara, US Treasury (1971–1972) – Don Eberly / Billy Trent
- Adam-12 (1971–1972) – Floyd Sinclair / Cleotis James
- Mannix (1972) – Jesse / Berdue
- Medical Center (1974) – Jeff
- Police Story (1975) – Clyde Williamson
- Barnaby Jones (1978) – Alexander Street
- Hill Street Blues (1982–1985) – Bobby Castro / Alonzo / Carter Reese
- Cagney & Lacey (1985) – Earl Covay
- Hooperman (1987–1989) – Inspector Clarence McNeil
- L.A. Law (1986–1990) – Detective Lester Tuttle
- Daughter of the Streets (1990) - Captain Towers
- Murphy Brown (1991) – John Lloyd Barrows
- The Fresh Prince of Bel-Air (1991–1992) – Lester
- Hangin' with Mr. Cooper (1993) – Mr. Foster
- NYPD Blue (1994) – Calvin Butler
- Living Single (1995) – Bernie
- Sports Night (1998) – Man
- Judging Amy (2002) – Dr. Connelly
