= The Rebels (TV series) =

- Genre: Drama; Interview; Talk show Historical
- Presented by: Keith Berwick
- Starring: Ron Thompson
- Country of origin: United States
- No. of episodes: 13

Production
- Producer: Sue Booker
- Running time: 30 minutes

Original release
- Network: KNBC
- Release: 1976 – 1976

The Rebels is a 1976 American television show broadcast on KNBC, NBC's owned-and-operated station in Los Angeles.

== Format ==
NBC television series where actors performed dramatic portrayals of famous American historical figures that were interviewed for a modern audience by host Keith Berwick.

== Episode list ==
The only season of The Rebels aired in 1976. It consisted of thirteen episodes.

No.	Title	Original release date
1	"Thomas Jefferson"	April 24, 1976
A fictional interview with Thomas Jefferson.
2	"Abigail Adams"	May 1, 1976
A fictional interview with historical figure Abigail Adams.
3	"Thomas Paine"	May 15, 1976
A fictional interview with Thomas Paine.
4	"Henry David Thoreau"	June 6, 1976
Actor Ron Thompson portrays Henry David Thoreau.
5	"Sojourner Truth"	June 12, 1976
A fictional interview with Sojourner Truth.
6	"John Brown"	June 19, 1976
A fictional interview with abolitionist John Brown.
7	"Dr. Martin Delany"	June 26, 1976
A fictional interview with Dr. Martin Delany.
8	TBA	1976
-
9	TBA	1976
-
10	TBA	1976
-
11	TBA	1976
-
12	TBA	1976
-
13	TBA	1976
-
