= A Shoreline Dream =

American indie rock band

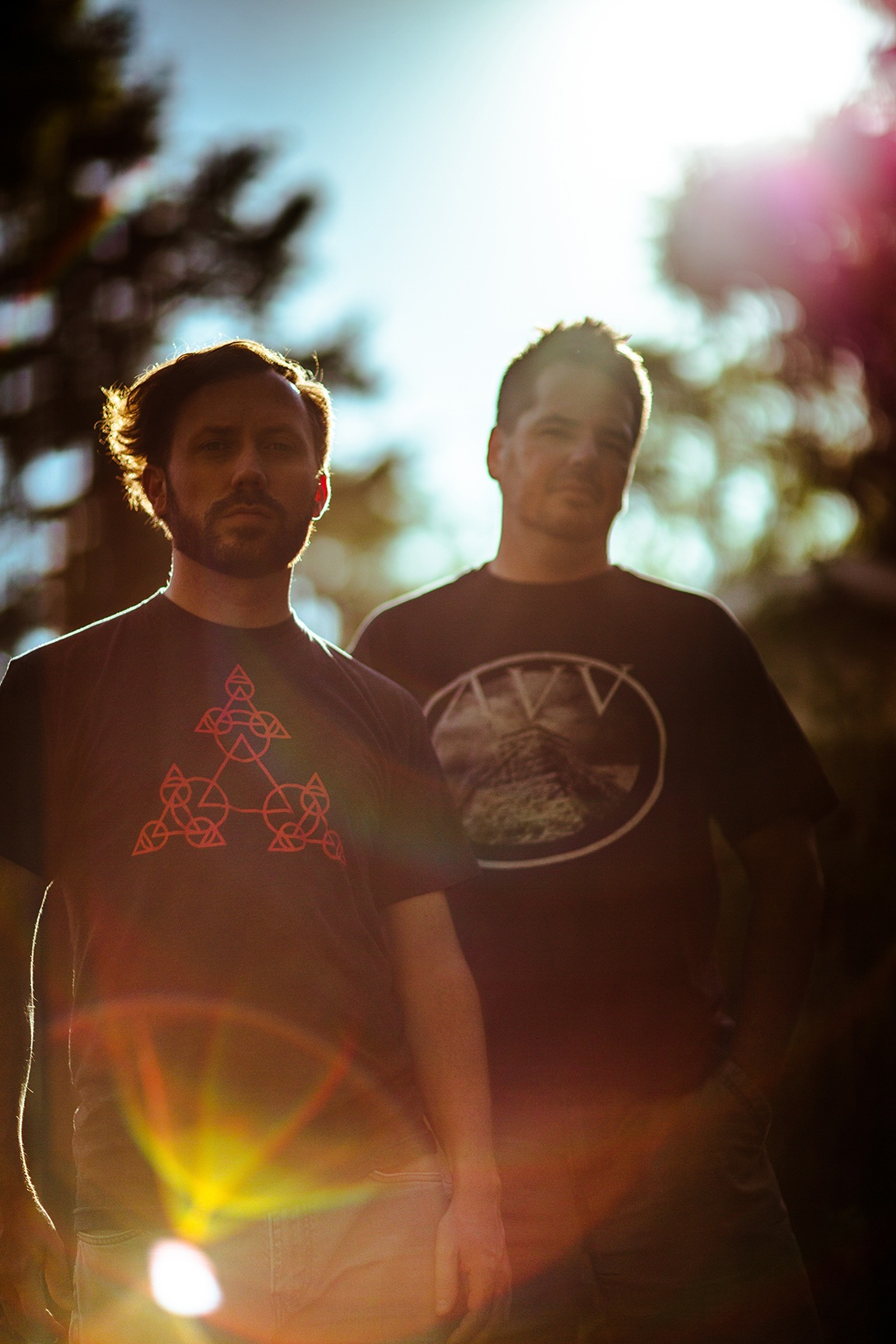
- Taken in 2014 by Eddie Breidenbach

Background information
- Origin: Barnum, Denver, Colorado, United States
- Genres: Indie rock, shoegazing, post-rock
- Years active: 2005–present
- Label: Latenight Weeknight Records
- Members: Ryan Policky; Erik Jeffries
- Past members: Gabriel Ratliff; Enoc Torraca; Michael Scarano; Adam Edwards; Sean Merrell; Jack Burns
- Website: ashorelinedream.com

A Shoreline Dream is an American indie rock band from the Barnum neighborhood of Denver, Colorado. Their sound has been described as being “a moody blend of psych ... and post-rock," as sounding "like a band out of time," and possessing a sound quality unique enough that it "outruns" the shoegaze moniker which bands of this kind are often labeled. The band currently consists of the two original members, vocalist/guitarist/producer Ryan Policky and guitarist Erik Jeffries, who record in their own Barnum-based Shoreline Studios.

== History ==
Policky formed A Shoreline Dream in 2005 with drummer/DJ Gabriel Ratliff. The pair had previously worked together in the bands Pure Drama (which issued two albums, 2001's On the Surface and 2003's Pure Drama) and Drop the Fear (which released a sole eponymous album in 2004). Jeffries was recruited from an earlier Policky project called Pure Drama, while bassist Enoc Torraca was culled from a group of acquaintances. The band used a mortgage on Policky's house to set up its own record label, Latenight Weeknight Records, and thus recorded, released and promoted a self-titled EP and debut full-length album Avoiding the Consequences in 2006.

In 2007, A Shoreline Dream released a second EP, Coastal, which attracted the attention of German producer Ulrich Schnauss, of whom the band were fans. Ratliff had departed by this point, and Michael Scarano drummed on two of the tracks. Schnauss subsequently collaborated with the band (including new drummer Sean Merrell) on the NeverChanger EP, which was mastered by Low/Galaxie 500 producer Kramer and released in July 2008, shortly after the band were featured in Urb Magazine's "Next 100."

After a 2008 summer tour with Schnauss, A Shoreline Dream, recorded their second full-length album, Recollections of Memory, which was released in February 2009 on Latenight Weeknight. The album was again mastered by Kramer, and included three more collaborations with Schnauss.

In September 2009, Torraca left the band to pursue individual goals and was replaced by Adam Edwards, formerly of Flyaway Minion.

The band were showcased at Austin's annual South by Southwest festival in March 2010.

In July 2010, the band recorded a collaboration with Schnauss, "London", at the latter's studio in Leytonstone, England. It was issued on January 24, 2011 on the Rocket Girl label's 3... 2... 1... A Rocket Girl Compilation.

In early 2011, they released a digital single, a cover of Fleetwood Mac's "The Chain", followed by a third album, Losing Them All to This Time. That July, British GQ used A Shoreline Dream's song "NeverChanger" in a video for their first iPad app. This spot featured Rosie Huntington-Whiteley and was also available on YouTube.

In 2012, the band released three EPs, one per month for three months, titled Three, 3 and III; that September the EPs were issued together as a limited-edition three-disc box set titled 333.

A Shoreline Dream finished 2012 with a single released on Christmas Day titled "The Land of Those Who Wander". Ensuing live performances that year featured the return of original drummer Ratliff)

A Shoreline Dream released their fourth album, The Silent Sunrise, on September 9, 2014. In a positive review, PopMatters described it as "what you’d get if My Bloody Valentine walked onto the ‘80s set of a John Hughes movie." For the recording, Policky and Jeffries were joined by bassist Edwards and drummers Scarano and Erin Tidwell.

== Discography ==
=== Albums ===
- Avoiding the Consequences (2006, Latenight Weeknight Records)
- Recollections of Memory (2009, Latenight Weeknight Records)
- Losing Them All to This Time (2011, Latenight Weeknight Records)
- The Silent Sunrise (2014, Latenight Weeknight Records)
- Melting (2020, Latenight Weeknight Records)
- Loveblind (2022, Latenight Weeknight Records)
- Whitelined (2024, Latenight Weeknight Records)
- To Where They Have Gone (2026, Latenight Weeknight Records)

=== Singles and EPs ===
- A Shoreline Dream EP (2006, Latenight Weeknight Records)
- "New York" single (2007, Latenight Weeknight Records)
- Coastal EP (2007, Latenight Weeknight Records)
- NeverChanger EP (2008, Latenight Weeknight Records)
- "The Chain" single (2011, Latenight Weeknight Records)
- Three EP (2012, Latenight Weeknight Records)
- 3 EP (2012, Latenight Weeknight Records)
- III EP (2012, Latenight Weeknight Records)
- "The Land of Those Who Wander" single (2012, Latenight Weeknight Records)
- "The Heart Never Recovered" single (2014, Latenight Weeknight Records)
- "Time Is a Machine Gun" single (2015, Latenight Weeknight Records)
- "Revolvist" single (2016, Latenight Weeknight Records)
- "Room for the Others" single (2017, Latenight Weeknight Records)
- Waitout EP (2018, Latenight Weeknight Records)
- "Always in Dreams" single (2026, Latenight Weeknight Records)
- "Triggered" single (2026, Latenight Weeknight Records)
- "Bleed & Reject" single (2026, Latenight Weeknight Records)
- "In The Clouds" single (2026, Latenight Weeknight Records)

=== Compilation albums ===
- 333 box set (2012, Latenight Weeknight Records)

=== Compilation appearances ===
- "London" with Ulrich Schnauss on 3... 2... 1... A Rocket Girl Compilation (2011, Rocket Girl)
