= Three Fact Fader =

Studio album by Engineers
- Released: 6 July 2009
- Recorded: 2007–2008
- Studio: Rockfield Studios, Monmouth, Wales; Jacobs Studios, Farnham, Surrey; Engineers Studio, London
- Genre: Post-rock, dream pop, shoegazing, indie rock
- Length: 56:31
- Label: Kscope
- Producer: Ken Thomas and Engineers

Engineers chronology
Engineers (2005)	Three Fact Fader (2009)	In Praise of More (2010)

Singles from Three Fact Fader
- 1. "Clean Coloured Wire" Released: 20 July 2009; 2. "What Pushed Us Together" Released: 7 December 2009

Professional ratings
Review scores
Source	Rating
AllMusic	3.5/5 stars
Bearded	(favourable)
Daily Express	4/5 stars
Drowned in Sound	8/10
Gigwise	4/5 stars
NME	8/10
The Scotsman	4/5 stars
The Skinny	4/5 stars
The Times	4/5 stars

Three Fact Fader is the second full-length studio album by British shoegazing band Engineers, released on 6 July 2009 through the Kscope label. The album was produced by the band along with Ken Thomas, who also worked with Sigur Rós, M83 and Maps, with artwork created by Tom Sheehan.

To start promoting the record, the band played their first live gig in over two years on 10 July 2009 at the Bush Hall in London. They were joined onstage by special guest Ulrich Schnauss (who would later join Engineers as a full-time member). Richard Barbieri of British progressive rock group Porcupine Tree also performed that night.

The Three Fact Fader minisite was set up by Kscope containing information about the album. A single for "Clean Coloured Wire" was released on 20 July 2009, and a video clip for the song was released through the minisite to accompany the single. The minisite also includes an excerpt of a remix of the song "Sometimes I Realise" by British musician, record producer, and Kscope label founder Steven Wilson.

The entire album was available for streaming through the website of NME.

== Track listing ==
All tracks are written by Engineers.

No.	Title	Length
1.	"Clean Coloured Wire"	5:12
2.	"Sometimes I Realise"	3:43
3.	"International Dirge"	5:12
4.	"Helped by Science"	4:22
5.	"Brighter as We Fall"	6:05
6.	"Hang Your Head"	4:38
7.	"Crawl from the Wreckage"	4:53
8.	"Three Fact Fader"	4:02
9.	"Song for Andy"	3:41
10.	"Emergency Room"	4:52
11.	"The Fear Has Gone"	3:49
12.	"Be What You Are"	2:44
13.	"What Pushed Us Together"	3:23

- Track 1 incorporates a sample of "Watussi" from the first Harmonia album Musik Von Harmonia, written by Hans-Joachim Roedelius, Dieter Moebius, and Michael Rother.

== Singles ==
- "Clean Coloured Wire" (20 July 2009)
  1. "Clean Coloured Wire" (Radio Edit)
  2. "Clean Coloured Wire" (SeriousMusic 438 kHz Mix)
  3. "Be What You Are" (Chicken Feed Remix)
  4. "Sometimes I Realise" (Steven Wilson Remix)
- "What Pushed Us Together" (7 December 2009)
  1. "What Pushed Us Together"
  2. "What Pushed Us Together" (A Ricardo Tobar Remix)

== Personnel ==
=== Musicians ===
- Simon Phipps – lead vocals, guitars
- Mark Peters – guitars, bass, programming and backing vocals
- Dan MacBean – guitars, keyboards programming and bass
- Andrew Sweeney – drums and backing vocals

=== Producers ===
- Produced and mixed by Ken Thomas and Engineers.
- Assisted by Ben Hampson, Jeff Knowler, and Ben Thackerey.
  - Track 6 mixed by Engineers and Ben Thackerey; additional mixing by Ken Thomas.
  - Tracks 12 and 13 produced and mixed by Mark Peters and Dan MacBean; assisted by Fred Vessey.
- Recorded at Rockfield Studio, Wales; Jacob's Studios, Surrey; and Engineers Studio, Rainford, Merseyside.
- Mixed at Miloco's Engine Room, London.
  - Tracks 12 and 13 mixed at Brittania Row Studio, London.
- String quartet on tracks 4, 10, and 11 arranged by Mark Peters and Dan MacBean; recorded at Townhouse Studios, London.
- Mastered by John Davis at Alchemy; except for tracks 12 and 13 mastered by Dick Beeson at 360 Mastering.

=== Graphic artists ===
- Tom Sheehan – cover photography and concept
- Justin Lambert – press photography
- Engineers – other photography
- Scott Robinson – other photography, website design, and CD package design
