= North Atlantic Oscillation (band) =

Post-progressive rock and electronic band

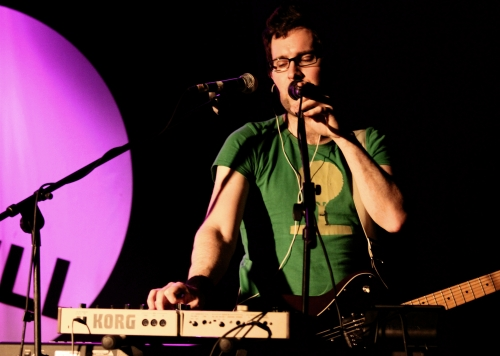
- Sam Healy from the band playing live in Leeds, UK

Background information
- Origin: Edinburgh, Scotland
- Genres: Post-progressive rock; electronic
- Years active: 2005–present
- Label: Kscope
- Members: Sam Healy (vocals, guitars, keyboards); Ben Martin (drums, programming); Chris Howard (bass, bass synth, backing vocals)
- Past members: Bill Walsh (bass, bass synth, backing vocals, remixes)
- Website: naoband.net

North Atlantic Oscillation are a post-progressive rock and electronic band from Edinburgh, Scotland. They are signed to the Kscope record label and released their debut album Grappling Hooks on 22 March 2010. The band currently consists of Sam Healy (lead vocals, guitars, keyboards), Ben Martin (drums, programming) and Chris Howard (bass, bass synth, backing vocals).

The band was initially formed in 2005 by Healy, who had played in several bands previously, and Martin, who had moved from the English Midlands to Edinburgh to study. The duo later expanded to a three piece when they added Bill Walsh to the live line-up. After Walsh left at the end of 2009 he was replaced by Howard, although Walsh still appears on-stage with the band from time to time on guitars and additional keyboards, and has produced several remixes for the band. The band are named after the North Atlantic Oscillation, a fluctuating change in the atmospheric pressure differential that exists between the Icelandic Low and Azores High.

In November 2009 the band released an EP titled Callsigns EP. As well as containing their own song "Cell Count", it also featured a remix by Engineers (also signed to Kscope) and a cover of "I Only Have Eyes For You", a song made popular by the American doo-wop group The Flamingos during the 1950s. During 2008, financed by Healy, the band recorded and mixed their debut album Grappling Hooks which was released on 22 March 2010 on the Kscope record label. It has received largely positive reviews from critics including the NME and Uncut magazine. Clash described the album as, "a near-criminal stockpile of beeps, buzzes and glitches generously sprayed over a spacious psychedelic rock canvas". However, some critics offered negative views. This included Drowned in Sound who criticised the record for failing to, "hit the heights it aims for". Nevertheless, during the week of its release it was featured as 'Album of the Week' on Zane Lowe's popular BBC Radio 1 evening show. Lowe himself described the music as, "super exciting new Rock n Roll for a new decade".

Their music has been compared to contemporary American bands such as Grandaddy and The Flaming Lips, Scottish bands such as The Beta Band, and 70s prog-rock band Pink Floyd. Their music combines elements of electronic beats with alt-rock guitars and "hazy vocals".

In 2013 Healy released a solo album under the name 'Sand', also on Kscope Music.

In August 2014, North Atlantic Oscillation announced their third studio album 'The Third Day'. The album was released on 6 October 2014 via Kscope.

In 2016, Healy released a second Sand album, A Sleeper, Just Awake, on the Vineland Music label.

In November 2018, North Atlantic Oscillation released their fourth album Grind Show on the Vineland Music label.

On 1st May 2023, the band released their fifth album United Wire.

== Discography ==
=== Albums ===
- Grappling Hooks (2010)
- Fog Electric (2012)
- The Third Day (2014)
- Grind Show (2018)
- United Wire (2023)

=== Compilation albums ===
- Lightning Strikes the Library (2016, compilation)

=== EPs ===
- Callsigns (2009)
- Chirality (2013)
- Glare (2015)
