= Mark Peters (musician) =

- Born: 21 July 1975 (age 51); Liverpool, England
- Genres: Shoegaze; ambient; dream pop; electronic
- Occupations: Guitarist; vocalist; producer
- Instruments: Vocals, guitar, bass
- Years active: 2003–present
- Labels: Kscope; The Echo Label; Bureau B; Sonic Cathedral; Pedigree Cuts; EMI Production Music
- Member of: Engineers
- Website: mark-peters.bandcamp.com

Mark Peters (born 21 July 1975) is an English musician, songwriter and producer who has mainly created music for the band Engineers. He has also collaborated with the electronic musician Ulrich Schnauss on three albums; Underrated Silence, Tomorrow Is Another Day. and Destiny Waiving.

In December 2017, Peters released his debut solo album, Innerland, In April 2019, Peters released a reworked version of his solo debut album, titled New Routes out of Innerland.

Schnauss and Peters have also collaborated on a remix of the track "Falling in Swirls" by Helios, "Keep it Softcore" by Naked Lunch, "The Wind Was Playing with My Hair" by Rainbirds.

== Discography ==
with Engineers

- Engineers (2005)
- Three Fact Fader (2009)
- In Praise of More (2010)
- Always Returning (2014)
- Pictobug (2020)

with Ulrich Schnauss

- Underrated Silence (2012)
- "Balcony Sunset"/"Sonnenaufgang 4:46 Uhr" – split single with Pyrolator (2012)
- Tomorrow Is Another Day (2013)
- "Remix of Rainbirds Wind Was Playing with My Hair"/"Im Nachtbus"/"Remix of Fehlfarben Herbstwind" – split single with Pyrolator (2014)
- Destiny Waiving (2021)

with Elliot Ireland

- Deep Blue (2015)
- Deep Blue Remixes EP (2015)

with Salt Rush

- Salt Rush with Mark Peters (2016)

with Clem Leek

- Thesis 19 (2020)

Solo

- Innerland (2017)
- "Silent Night" (2017)
- "Jingle Bells" (2018)
- New Routes out of Innerland (2019)
- Ambient Innerland (2019)
- Box of Delights 7" (2019)
- Winterland EP (2019)
- Home KPM Shorts (2020)
- Red Sunset Dreams (2022)
- The Magic Hour EP (2023)
- Progress EP (2024)
- 9 tracks on Celebrate Yourself! The Sonic Cathedral Story 2004–2024
- "Jingle Bells" included on Maps / Younghusband / Mark Peters 7" 2024
- Shadow Quarter EP (2025)
