= Cargo (2018 film) =

2018 American horror thriller film

- Film poster
- Directed by: James Dylan
- Written by: James Dylan
- Produced by: James Dylan; Christopher Gosch; J.C. Maçek III
- Starring: Ron Thompson; Eliot; Mark Wood; Corbin Timbrook; Matthew Rosvally; Jose Rosete; Danika Fields; J.C. Maçek III
- Cinematography: Christopher Gosch
- Edited by: Christopher Gosch; Rob Gosch; George Missor
- Music by: Thorsten Quaeschning
- Distributed by: Wild Eye Releasing
- Release dates: July 17, 2018 (Beverly Hills); November 13, 2018
- Running time: 80 minutes
- Country: United States
- Language: English

Cargo is a 2018 American horror thriller film directed by James Dylan and starring Ron Thompson.

== Plot ==
A corrupt businessman awakens trapped inside a locked cargo container with only a cell phone. He is given 24 hours to raise ten million in his own ransom money or his kidnappers will let him suffocate.

== Critical reception ==
Ain't It Cool News wrote "This is a low budget horror film. This entire movie sticks in that storage container. If you enjoy a film that dares to give you every shot possible within a large box like BURIED, SAW, and DEVIL, then I think you’ll enjoy CARGO."

1428 Elm said "So overall Cargo is a suspenseful movie that delivers. Ron Thompson gives a solid performance. You can feel his anxiety and pain (there is one scene where he “tortures” himself). He is the only one onscreen, after all. I would give Cargo 4 out of 5 stars. It’s a short movie with a strong message, money can't always save you!"

Film Threat wrote "Since then, strong entries in the subgenre like Locke and 10 Cloverfield Lane have kept the fire alive. The new indie film [Cargo] wants to join their ranks, but within the first minute, it’s clear that its contents should be left to suffocate and die."

Rue Morgue said "If [CARGO] was a five-minute short film, I’d recommend a watch with a drunken batch of friends, but as a feature. . . Well, I’ve already labeled the movies it borrows from, so just watch those instead."

== Soundtrack ==
The Cargo original motion picture soundtrack was composed by Tangerine Dream front man Thorsten Quaeschning.

Ain't It Cool News wrote "The soundtrack here is awesome by Tangerine Dream's Thorsten Quaeschning! It really reminded me of John Carpenter's THE THING at times."

Ain't It Cool News also wrote "Hey, folks... remember that teaser for [CARGO] that we covered a couple of weeks ago? A snippet of music from it has been released... and it's spellbindingly good. If it conjures up Stein and Dixon's work on STRANGER THINGS for you, that's no surprise-- Tangerine Dream's Thorsten Quaeschning composed the soundtrack. Seeing the trailer, I was expecting something atonal and basic like Jason Segal's FORGETTING SARAH MARSHALL character might have performed under the direction 'dark and ominous'... but this is something out of my TRON dreams.

Mojo magazine wrote "IF ANYONE knows how to pastiche an '80s Tangerine Dream soundtrack it’s Thorsten Quaeschning of Picture Palace Music."

Conversely, Film Threat said "The synthwave soundtrack is a bizarre fit for the material, but it's fine."

The Cargo soundtrack was performed live by composer Thorsten Quaeschning on September 29, 2018 at the Electronic Circus Festival in Germany.

== Novelization ==
The Cargo official novelization was written by Cargo producer J.C. Maçek III and published by UK publisher Bloodhound Books.

Kirkus Reviews described the novel as "A frequently intense kidnapping tale that takes full advantage of its confined setting."
