= PopMatters =

International online pop culture magazine

- Managing Editor: Karen Zarker
- Founder: Sarah Zupko
- Founded: October 1999; 26 years ago
- Based in: Chicago
- Language: English
- Website: popmatters.com
- OCLC: 1122752384

PopMatters is an international online magazine of cultural criticism that covers aspects of popular culture. PopMatters publishes reviews, interviews, and essays on cultural products and expressions in areas such as music, television, films, books, video games, comics, sports, theater, visual arts, travel, and the Internet.

== History ==
PopMatters was founded by Sarah Zupko, who had previously established the cultural studies academic resource site PopCultures. PopMatters launched in late 1999 as a sister site providing original essays, reviews and criticism of various media products. Over time, the site went from a weekly publication schedule to a five-day-a-week magazine format, expanding into regular reviews, features, and columns. In the fall of 2005, monthly readership exceeded one million readers.

From 2006 onward, PopMatters produced several syndicated newspaper columns for McClatchy-Tribune News Service. By 2009 there were four different pop culture related columns each week.

The PopMatters Book Imprint published Joss Whedon: The Complete Companion, edited by Mary Money, with Titan Books in May 2012. The imprint also published four books in a series with Counterpoint/Soft Skull in 2008–2009 including China Underground by Zachary Mexico, Apocalypse Jukebox: The End of the World in American Popular Music by Edward Whitelock and David Janssen, Rebels Wit Attitude: Subversive Rock Humorists by Iain Ellis, and The Solitary Vice: Against Reading by Mikita Brottman.

== Staff ==
PopMatters publishes content from worldwide contributors. Its staff includes writers from backgrounds ranging from academics and professional journalists to career professionals and first time writers. Many of its writers are published authorities in various fields of study.

Notable contributors include David Weigel, political reporter for Slate, Steven Hyden, staff writer for Grantland and author of Whatever Happened to Alternative Nation?, writer, author and film producer J.C. Maçek III, documentarian and writer Rodger Jacobs and Rob Horning, executive editor of The New Inquiry. Karen Zarker is the managing editor.
