= Bianca Froese-Acquaye =

German artist, author and painter (born 1964)

- Born: Bianca Acquaye; 1964 (age 61–62); West Germany
- Known for: Painter, photographer, producer, vocalist, author
- Spouse: Edgar Froese
- Website: Official website

Bianca Froese-Acquaye is a painter, photographer, producer, vocalist, and author. She is the manager of the band Tangerine Dream.

She performed vocals on the 2002 Tangerine Dream album Inferno.

She is the co-author of Edgar Froese's autobiography Force Majeure. Bianca Froese-Acquaye co-produced the TV-documentary Tangerine Dream: Sound from Another World and the longer cine version Revolution of Sound: Tangerine Dream, directed by Margarete Kreuzer.

The 2014 Grand Theft Auto V soundtrack album The Cinematographic Score — GTA 5 was composed and produced by Edgar Froese, while Bianca Froese-Acquaye provided the cover art and acted as executive producer.

== Personal life ==
Froese-Acquaye is of mixed German and Ghanaian descent.
