= Thorsten Quaeschning =

German musician

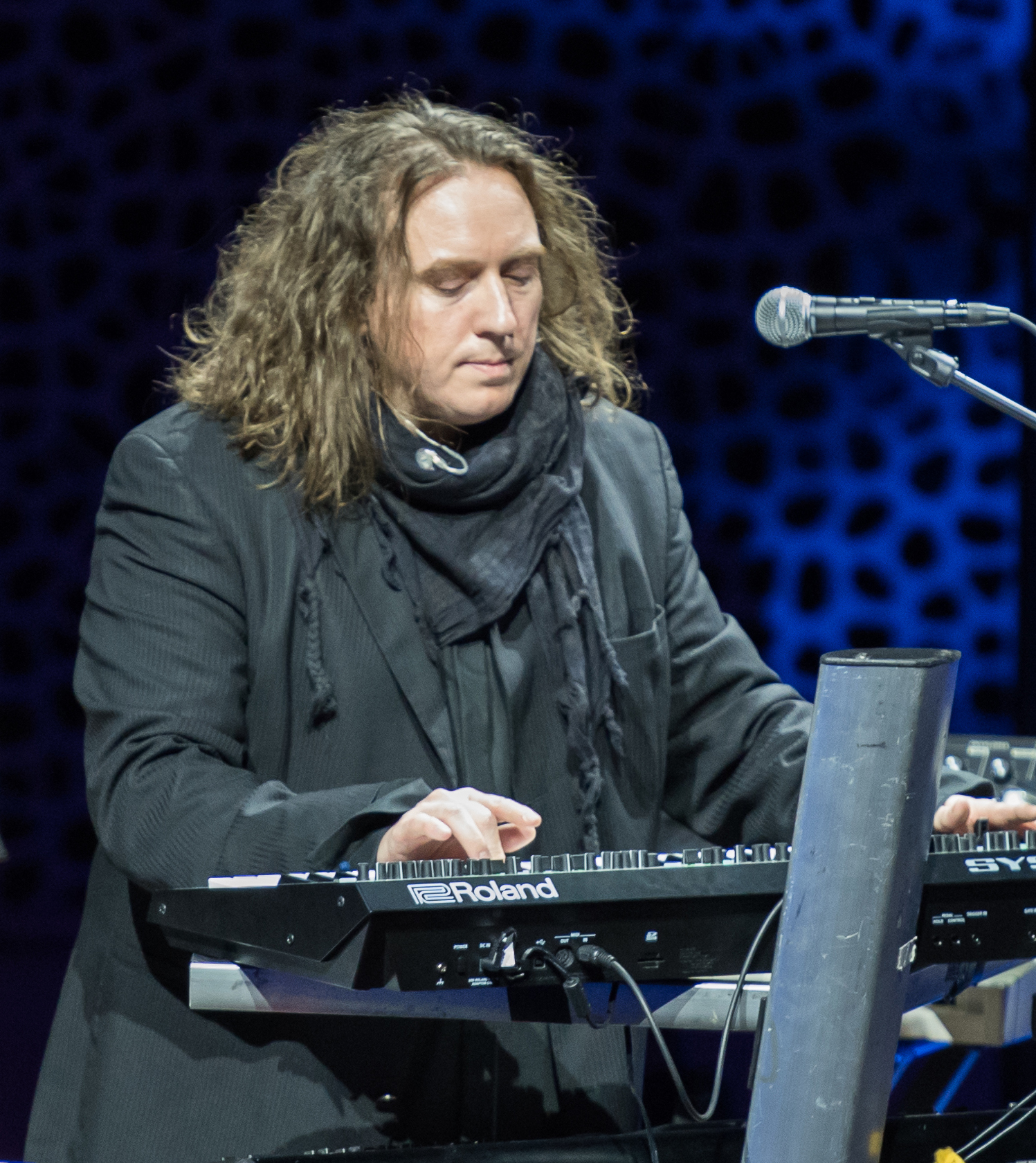
- Quaeschning performing with Tangerine Dream in 2018

Background information
- Born: 23 February 1977 (age 48); Berlin, Germany
- Genres: Electronic; ambient; soundtrack
- Occupations: Musician, composer, producer
- Instruments: Synthesizers, vocals, guitar, drums
- Labels: Pledge, Azure Vista, Invisible Hands
- Member of: Tangerine Dream
- Website: thorstenquaeschning.com

Thorsten Quaeschning (born 23 February 1977) is a German musician. He is the bandleader of the electronic music group Tangerine Dream which he joined in 2005. He was chosen to continue as leader of the group by founder Edgar Froese shortly before his death in 2015. He performs synthesizers, vocals, guitar and drums.

== Early life ==
Quaeschning was born in 1977 in Berlin to a classically trained, music-loving family.

As a child, he learned violin, piano, drums, and flute; and was drawn to classical composers such as Engelbert Humperdinck, Wagner, Telemann, Smetana and Mozart.

== Career ==
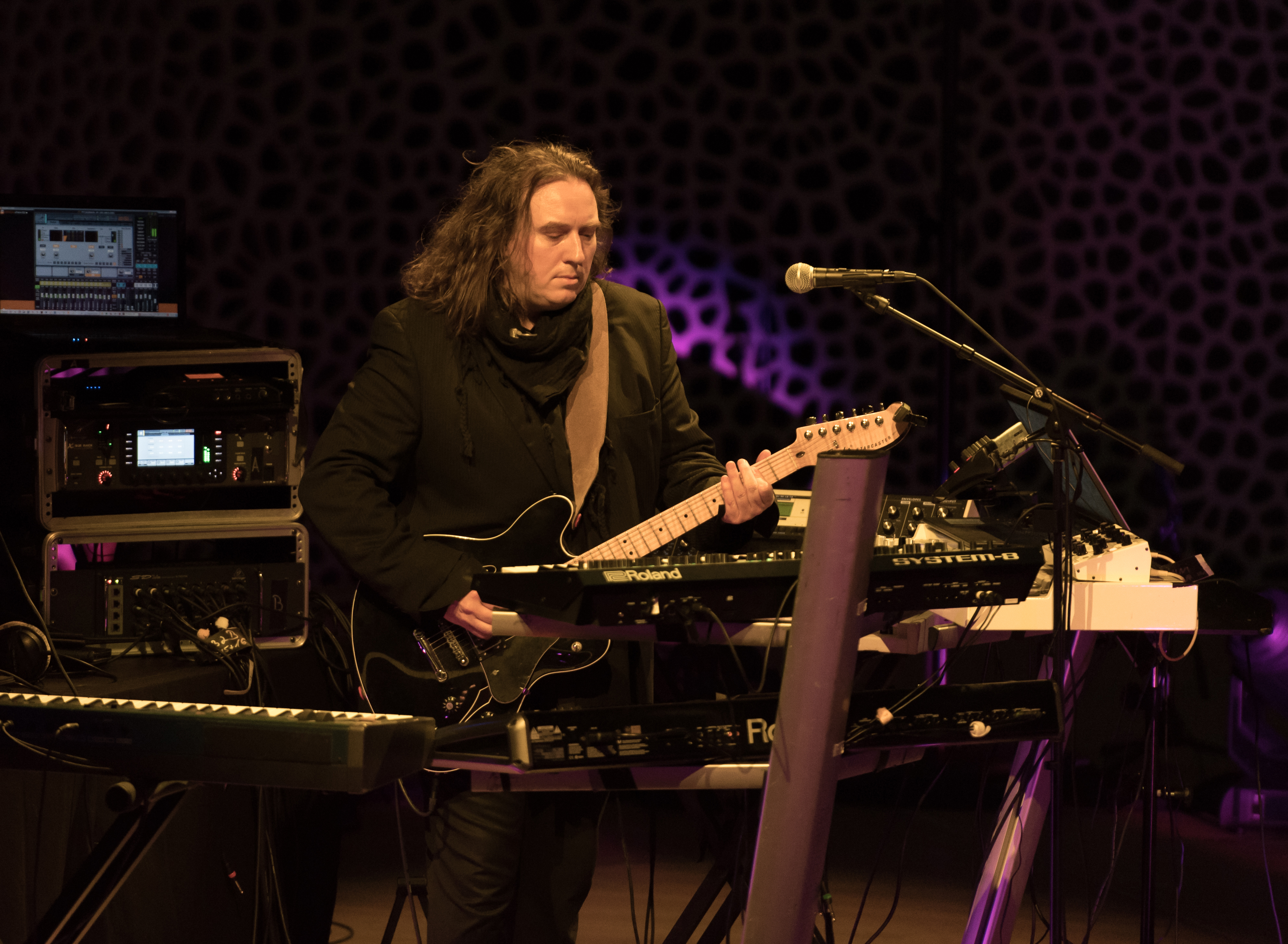
Quaeschning performing with Tangerine Dream in 2018

Before joining Tangerine Dream, Quaeschning worked as a producer for the band Minory. Afterwards, he began to tour with Tangerine Dream behind the scenes in 2003 before joining them two years later.

Quaeschning has a second band called Picture Palace music.

In 2018, Quaeschning released the soundtrack to the thriller film Cargo.

== Discography ==
=== Solo ===
- Icicled Drone Session (2018)
- The Seaside Stage Session (2019)
- The Munich Session (2019)
- Autokino Session (2020)
- The Capitol Session (2020)
- Ballhaus Session (2020)
- Ama (2021)

=== with Ulrich Schnauss ===
- Synthwaves (2017)

=== with Picture Palace Music ===
- Nostalgia (2006)
- Somnambulistic Tunes (2007)
- Symphony for Vampires (2008)
- Natatorium (2009)
- Fairy-Marsh-Districts (2010)
- Midsummer (2010)
- Metropolis Poetry (2011)
- Indulge the Passion (2012)
- Remnants (2013)
- Cargo (2018)
