= Ulrich Schnauss =

German musician and producer

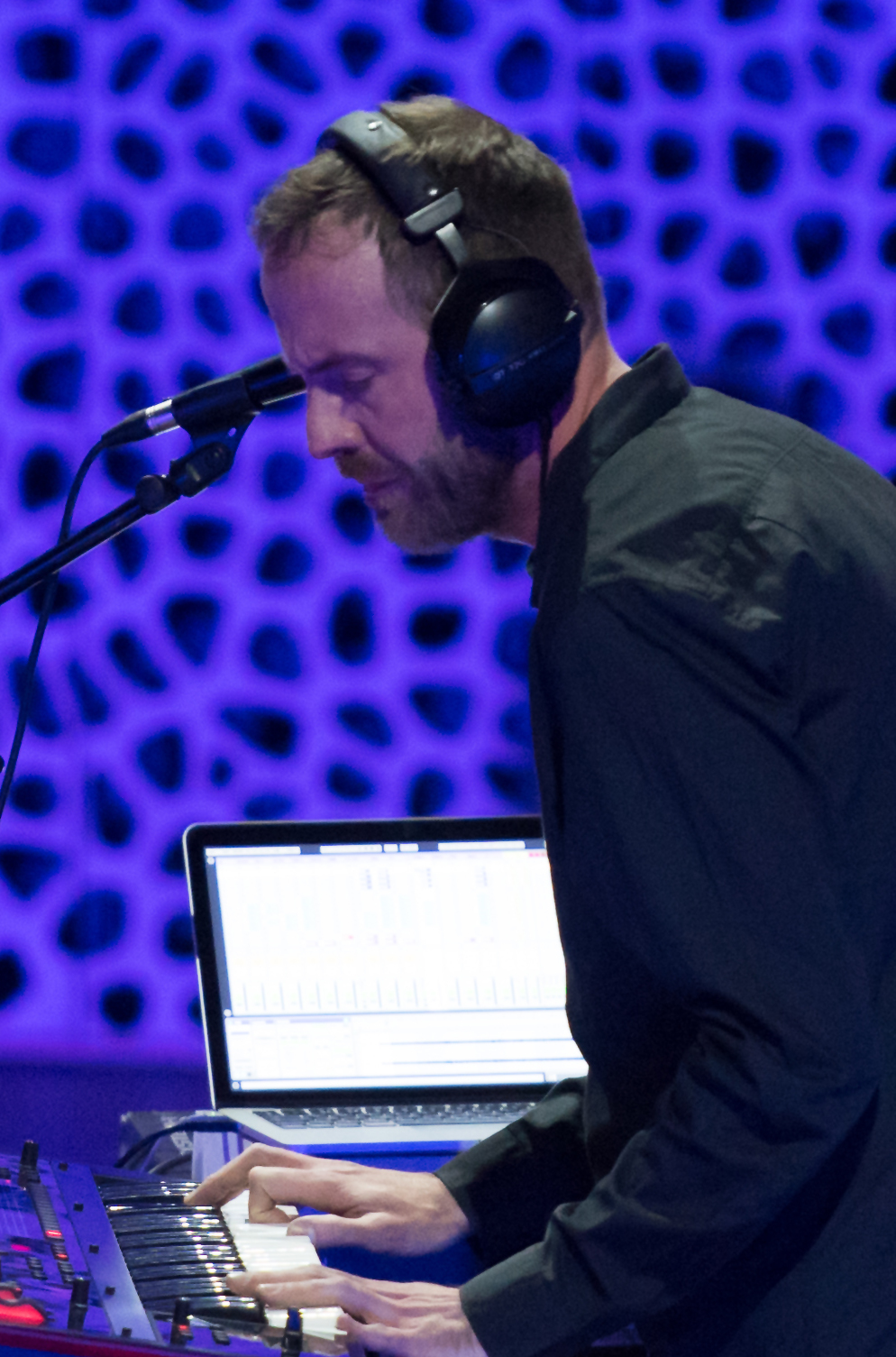
- Schnauss in 2018

Background information
- Born: 8 September 1977 (age 49); Kiel, West Germany
- Genres: Electronic, ambient, downtempo, IDM, shoegaze
- Occupations: Musician, music producer, remixer
- Labels: Independiente/Domino, Rocket Girl: A Shoreline Dream; Bianca Froese-Acquaye; BT; Edgar Froese; Engineers; Hoshiko Yamane; Longview; Mark Peters; Tangerine Dream; Thorsten Quaeschning; Quaeschning & Schnauss
- Website: ulrich-schnauss.com

Ulrich Schnauss (born 8 September 1977) is a German electronic musician and producer based in London, England. He was a member of Tangerine Dream from 2014 to 2020.

== Biography ==
Ulrich Schnauss was born in the northern German seaport of Kiel in 1977. He had piano lessons when he was seven. He became interested in a range of music: My Bloody Valentine, Slowdive, Tangerine Dream, Chapterhouse, and early bleep and breakbeat tracks. There was not much opportunity to see his musical influences in Kiel, so he moved to Berlin in 1996.

Schnauss' musical output began under the pseudonyms of View to the Future and Ethereal 77. These electronica and drum-driven pieces were noticed by Berlin electronica label CCO (City Centre Offices), to which Schnauss sent CDs on a regular basis. Schnauss developed these submissions to CCO into his first album under his own name, Far Away Trains Passing By, released in Europe in 2001 and in the United States in 2005.

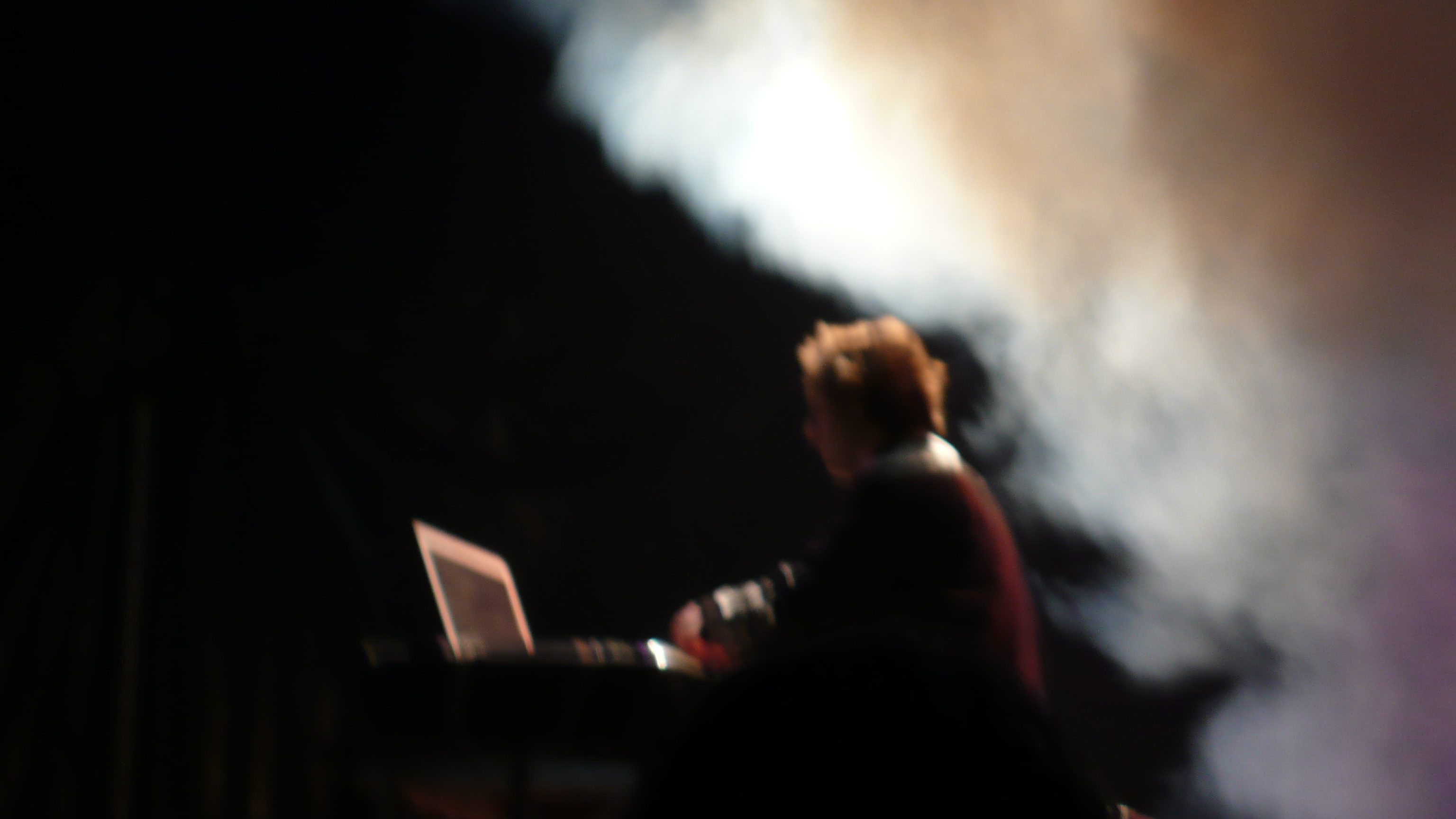
Schnauss performing at Bestival (2008)

His next album, 2003's A Strangely Isolated Place, showed the influence of My Bloody Valentine's Kevin Shields and Cocteau Twins' Robin Guthrie. Schnauss has said of this album, "When you've worked with computers and keyboards for a number of years, they become not so fascinating of themselves anymore. I gained confidence after people began to discover Far Away Trains Passing By, and it hasn't really stopped since then. This time I decided not to compromise on what I wanted to do, with what I thought people might want me to do."

Since the release of both albums Schnauss has been asked to work with and remix with artists, including port-royal, Mojave 3, Airiel, A Shoreline Dream, Asobi Seksu, Televise, Longview, Johannes Schmoelling, The Zephyrs, Lunz (Roedelius), and others.

He also plays keyboards for UK indie band Longview, whose singer Rob McVey was featured on Schnauss' next album, Goodbye. In an interview, he said: "I have always loved music that has both elements: melancholy and sadness as a description of the current situation you are in, but at the same time a hopeful, utopian element that reminds you of the possibility of a different life."

His third album, Goodbye, was completed in early 2007. It was released in Europe by Independiente Records on 25 June 2007. The United States release followed on 10 July under Domino Records. Regarding this album, he said: "The overall idea was pretty much the same. I just wanted to merge the indie songwriting elements and electronic instrumentation. After the previous album I still had a feeling like there was more room to take these ideas to an extreme level when it comes to layering and laying down as many tracks as possible."

On 12 June 2007, Schnauss released an EP, Quicksand Memory, which contains two remixes by Robin Guthrie of previous releases, a mix by Rob McVey of a previously unreleased track, and an edit of a track appearing on his latest album.

In the spring of 2008, Schnauss remixed two tracks by the Manchester-based shoegaze band Daniel Land and the Modern Painters. On 27 October 2008, the two tracks, "Within the Boundaries" and "Benjamin's Room", were released as a double A-side 7" single by the independent record label Sonic Cathedral, the label's 11th release.

In July 2008, the Stars EP was released to support his June/July US tour. A co-produced/co-written track with A Shoreline Dream, titled "neverChanger", was released on an EP of the same name. Schnauss traveled out for a short tour with the band in Texas and Colorado to promote this effort and performed this track with A Shoreline Dream during his performances.

In October 2009, Schnauss' record labels, Independiente and Domino, sued Guns N' Roses, alleging that the band had committed copyright infringement by using portions of Schnauss' compositions in the track "Riad 'n the Bedouins" on the album Chinese Democracy.

In 2010, Schnauss was involved in the mixing of Exit Calm's self-titled debut album.

Schnauss also provided keyboards and backing vocals on Engineers' third album, In Praise of More. Schnauss also played as a headlining act for the "Phrase One" festival held in the small Irish town of Carrick-on-Shannon on 19 April 2013.

Schnauss was a member of Tangerine Dream from 2014 to 2020. His first release with the group was the mini-album Mala Kunia (2014) which launched "The Quantum Years"-era of the group influenced by quantum physics.

After obtaining the rights to his entire catalog, Schnauss remastered and mixed all five of his solo studio albums, releasing them in 2019 on the 7CD compilation box set Now is a Timeless Present, along with a bonus disc of unreleased recordings and outtakes. Albums A Long Way to Fall and No Further Ahead than Today were also re-worked and partially re-recorded, and given new artwork and titles of A Long Way to Fall – Rebound and No Further Ahead than Tomorrow. Each remastered album was later released individually in 2020.

== In other media ==
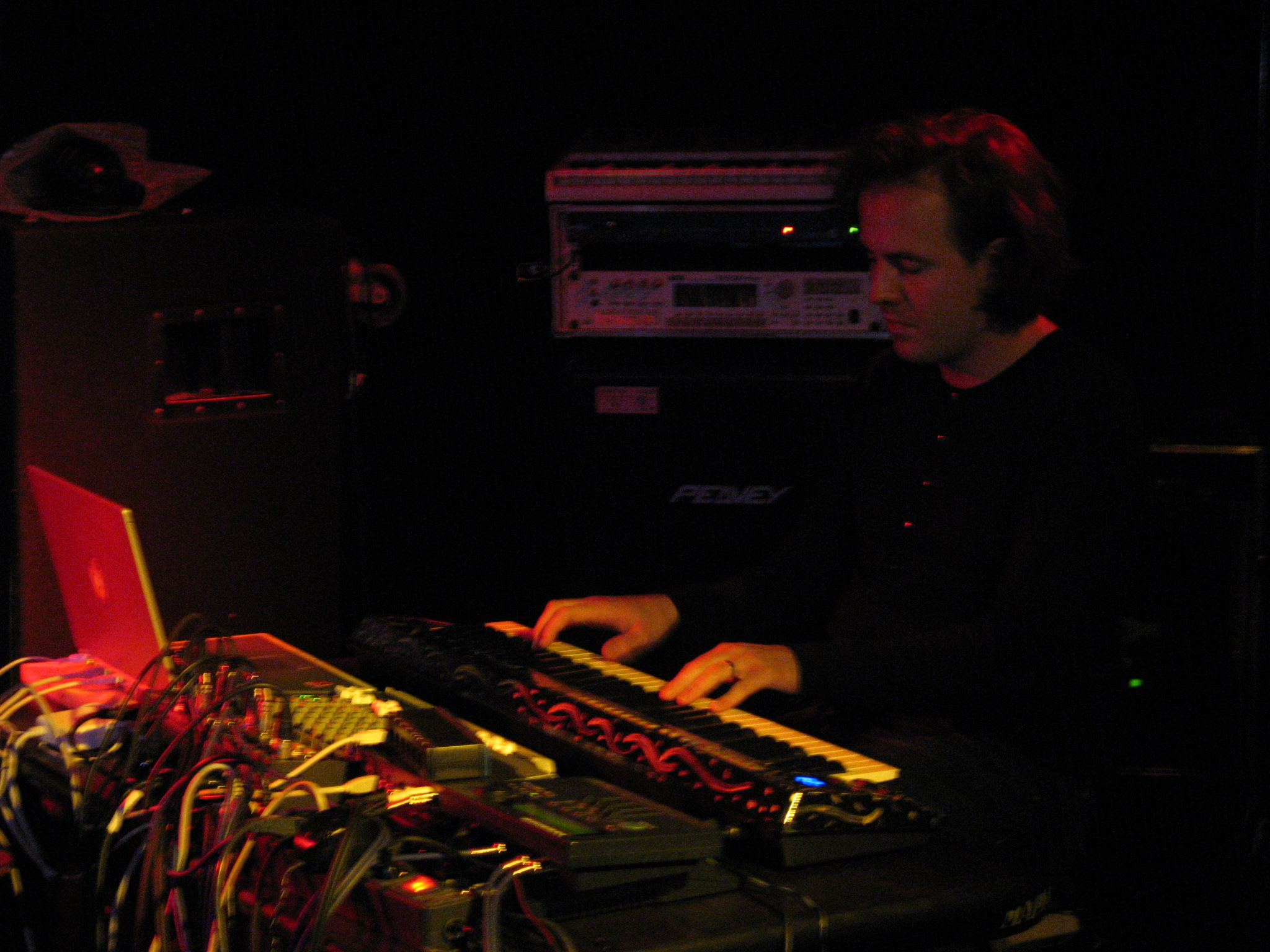
Live in London

- "Monday Paracetamol", from A Strangely Isolated Place, was used as one of the BGMs for the 2007 version of popular global EA Sports video game franchise Tiger Woods PGA tour.
- Later in 2007, "On My Own", from A Strangely Isolated Place, was used by Pontiac in its "Cars" TV commercial.
- GMC's Super Bowl commercial in 2008 ("Mountain Top") featured "Blumenwiese Neben Autobahn", from Far Away Trains Passing By.
- "Knuddelmaus" was used in the 2009 "My Phone Can Read My Mind" TV commercial for the Palm Pre starring Tamara Hope.
- "A Million Miles Away" was featured in the PAL territory version of the PlayStation 2 video game Gran Turismo 4 (Also hidden in Music Theatre in NTSC-J version).
- "...Passing By", from Far Away Trains Passing By, was featured in the 2005 movie Elizabethtown and its accompanying soundtrack
- In the CSI: Miami Season 3 episode "Under the Influence", the song "On My Own" can be heard playing in the background as the newest addition to Horatio Caine's team, Ryan Wolfe (played by Jonathan Togo), is busy searching through Kenwall "Duke" Duquesne's car for evidence.
- "On My Own", from A Strangely Isolated Place, was featured in the Spring Summer 2012 collection for Emanuel Ungaro.
- "Look at the Sky" was selected as the Tom Hiddleston song of the day on 1 November 2011.
- "Stars" was used as the backing track in a 2014 Cadillac CTS Sedan TV commercial.
- "Gone Forever" is used in the closing scene and during the beginning of the end credits in the 2014 film White Bird in a Blizzard, featuring Shailene Woodley.

== Pseudonyms and groups ==
- Ulrich Schnauss
- Ethereal 77
- View to the Future
- The Extremist
- Hexaquart
- Police in Cars With Headphones
- Hair (with Alex Krueger)
- Beroshima
- Measured
- Tinkabell
- Longview (keyboardist)
- Engineers (keyboardist)

== Discography ==
=== Releases ===
Release title	Released as	Release type	Label	Year
Broken	View to the Future	12" single	White Label	1995
Wegwerfgesellschaft	Police in Cars with Headphones	CD album	FSP	1995
Journey to the Other World	View to the Future	12" single	VTTF	1996
Purity	View to the Future	12" single	Alphakid Recordings	1997
Music Is Music	View to the Future	12" single	Airdrops	1997
We Rule the 80s	Hair (With Alex Krueger)	12" EP	Müller	1997
The 7th Seal	View to the Future	CD album	Alphakid Recordings	1997
Unicorn	View to the Future	12" single	Case Invaders	1998
Hair 2	Hair (With Alex Krueger)	12" EP	USM	1998
Spring Rmx	Ethereal 77	12" single	Base Daddy	1999
Landscapes	Ethereal 77	CD album	Base Daddy	1999
Ignorance	Junkie Sartre Vs Hexaquart	12" EP	Force Tracks	2000
Exploitation	Hexaquart	12" EP	Lifetime	2001
Far Away Trains Passing By	Ulrich Schnauss	CD / LP	City Centre Offices	2001
Zero Gravity	Ethereal 77	12" single	Looking Good	2002
A Strangely Isolated Place	Ulrich Schnauss	CD / 2xLP	City Centre Offices (Europe) / Domino (US)	2003
Quicksand Memory EP	Ulrich Schnauss	CD/EP	Independiente (Europe) / Domino (US)	2007
Goodbye	Ulrich Schnauss	CD/LP	Independiente (Europe) / Domino (US)	2007
Stars	Ulrich Schnauss	CD/EP	Independiente (Europe) / Domino (US)	2008
neverChanger	A Shoreline Dream	CD/EP	Latenight Weeknight	2008
Recollections of Memory	A Shoreline Dream	CD album	Latenight Weeknight	2009
Ulrich Schnauss & Jonas Munk	Ulrich Schnauss & Jonas Munk	CD album	Pedigree Cuts	2011
Underrated Silence	Ulrich Schnauss & Mark Peters	CD album	Bureau B	2012
77 EP	Ulrich Schnauss & ASC	12" EP	Auxiliary	2012
A Long Way to Fall	Ulrich Schnauss	CD album	PIAS	21 January 2013
Tomorrow Is Another Day	Ulrich Schnauss & Mark Peters	CD album	Bureau B	2013
No Further Ahead Than Tomorrow	Ulrich Schnauss	CD / 2xLP	PIAS	2016
Passage	Ulrich Schnauss & Jonas Munk	CD / LP	Azure Vista Records	2017
Synthwaves	Ulrich Schnauss & Thorsten Quaeschning			2017
Snöflingor EP	Seba & Ulrich Schnauss	12" EP	Blu Mar Ten	2017
Now Is a Timeless Present	Ulrich Schnauss		Scripted Realities	2019
Eight Fragments of an Illusion	Ulrich Schnauss & Jonas Munk	CD / LP	Azure Vista Records	2021
Destiny Waiving	Ulrich Schnauss & Mark Peters			2021

=== with Tangerine Dream ===
- Mala Kunia (2014)
- Booster VII (2015) (appears only on tracks "Heart Throb" and "Shadow and Sun")
- Supernormal – The Australian Concerts 2014 (2015)
- Quantum Key (2015)
- Live at the Philharmony Szczecin – Poland 2016 (2016)
- Particles (2016)
- Quantum Gate (2017)
- Light Flux (2017)
- The Sessions I (2017)
- The Sessions II (2018)
- The Sessions III (2018)
- The Sessions IV (2018)
- Recurring Dreams (2019)
- The Sessions V (2019)
- Live at Augusta Raurica Switzerland 2016 (2019)
- The Sessions VI (2020)
- The Sessions VII (2021)

=== Compilation appearances (exclusive tracks only) ===
- Police in Cars with Headphones – "Bitte Lächeln – Wenn Sie Wollen" on Artgenda 96
- View to the Future – "Addicted to Your Smile" on Barcode
- Tinkabell – "Rosarotes Meer" on Chillin' Voices 2 (Shift Music – Collaboration With K. Hein)
- Ethereal 77 – "Forever" on Schöne Neue Welt (Space Teddy)
- Ethereal 77 – "Oblivion" & "Open Skiez" on Unpleasant Poems (Ground Liftaz)
- Ulrich Schnauss – "Nothing Happens in June" on Mashed Mellow Grooves 5
- Ulrich Schnauss – "You Were the Only One Around" on The Sound of the Cosmos (Hooj Choons)
- Ulrich Schnauss – "Crazy for You" & "Wherever You Are" on Blue Skied an' Clear (Morr Music)
- Ulrich Schnauss – "As If You've Never Been Away" on The Trip (Universal)
- Ulrich Schnauss – "On My Own (Sasha Involver Remix)" on Involver (Global Underground)
- Ulrich Schnauss – "Nobody's Home" on Nick Warren:Reykjavik (Global Underground)
- Ulrich Schnauss – "Here Today, Gone Tomorrow" (live version) on Vapor Trails: The Echoes Living Room Concerts Volume 14 (Echodisc)

=== Remixes ===
==== As Ulrich Schnauss ====
- Death Cab for Cutie – "Home Is a Fire (Ulrich Schnauss Remix)" (Atlantic)
- aus – "Halo (Ulrich Schnauss Remix)" on Lang Remixed (Preco)
- Madrid – "Out to Sea" (YYZ Records)
- port-royal – "Stimmung" (Resonant Recordings)
- The High Violets – "Chinese Letter" (Reverb Records)
- Howling Bells – "Setting Sun" (Bella Union)
- Lycoriscoris - "Shirabe" (Anjunadeep)
- Johannes Schmoelling – "Icewalk" (Viktoriapark – Collaboration with Robert Wässer)
- Hrk – "Love World" (Joint Records)
- Obscure Celebrities – "Fahreinheit" (Gooom Disques)
- I'm Not a Gun – "Make Sense & Loose" (City Centre Offices)
- Airiel – "Sugar Crystals" (Highwheel)
- Justin Robertson – "Love Movement" (Bugged Out)
- Mojave 3 – "Bluebird of Happiness" (4ad)
- Longview – "Can't Explain" (14th Floor Rec)
- Longview – "Will You Wait Here" (14th Floor Rec)
- Pete Lawrence – "Musical Box" (Big Chill)
- Sia – "Breathe Me" (Go Beat)
- Depeche Mode – "Little 15" (Reprise/Mute)
- The Zephyrs – "Stand Round Hold Hands" (Club Ac30)
- Coldplay – "Talk" (Parlophone)
- Rachel Goswell – "Coastline" (4AD)
- Mark Gardener – "The Story of the Eye" (Sonic Cathedral)
- Asobi Seksu – "Strawberries" (One Little Indian)
- A Sunny Day in Glasgow – "Ghost in the Graveyard" (Ruined Potential Records)
- Kriece presents Shamatha – "Eye of the Beholder"
- Mint Julep – "To the Sea" (Village Green)
- Skye – "Featherlight" (Pias Recordings)
- Pet Shop Boys – "Memory of the Future" (Parlophone/EMI)
- Locust – "Fall for Me" (Editions Mego)
- St. Savor – "Mysterious Russian Souls" (Sudbeat)
- Donni Sò – "La Pagliarella"(Stereo Deluxe)
- Keaton Henson – "Elevator Song" (Oak Ten Records)
- Archive – "Black and Blue" (Dangervisit)
- Naibu feat. Key – "Just Like You" (Horizons Music)
- Yppah – "Occasional Magic" (Counter Records)
- Dave DK – "Kronsee" (Kompakt)
- Project Skyward – "Holographic Universe" (Nebula Records)
- matryoshka – "Niedola" (Virgin Babylon Records)
- András Schiff – Bach: Prelude and Fugue In C (Decca Records)
- Bryan Ferry and Todd Terje – "Johnny and Mary" (BMG)
- Celldweller – "Awakening with You" (FiXT)

==== As View to the Future ====
- Korsakow & Nudge (Usm)

==== As Hexaquart ====
- Daniel Lodig – Connect (Müller)
- Beroshima – Electronic Discussion (Müller)

== See also ==
- A Shoreline Dream
- Carl Weingarten
