= Engineers (band) =

English band

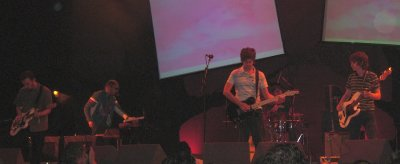
- Engineers performing at Summer Sundae 2005

Background information
- Origin: London, England
- Genres: Shoegaze, dream pop
- Years active: 2003– present
- Labels: Kscope; Echo Records
- Members: Mark Peters; Ulrich Schnauss; Matthew Linley
- Past members: Simon Phipps; Daniel Land; Dan MacBean; Andrew Sweeney
- Website: http://www.kscopemusic.com/engineers

Engineers are a British shoegaze/dream pop band. The band was formed in London in 2003 by bassist/guitarist/keyboardist Mark Peters, singer/guitarist Simon Phipps, bassist/guitarist Dan MacBean (previously known as guitarist of The Shining), and drummer Andrew Sweeney. After the release of their second album Three Fact Fader in 2009, MacBean and Sweeney left the band, and were replaced by bassist/vocalist Daniel Land, drummer Matthew Linley, and keyboardist Ulrich Schnauss. Phipps and Land would later leave the band before the release of 2014's Always Returning. Engineers' sound has been described as "hazy, ethereal and atmospheric" and the band often cites the works of The Beach Boys, Brian Eno, Cocteau Twins, Spiritualized and Pink Floyd as influences.

== History ==
=== Beginnings and debut album ===
Engineers were signed to the Echo Records label in 2004, and the band recorded and released their first single "Home"/"New Horizons" in April 2004; both songs were re-recorded for the band's debut album the following year. The mini-album Folly arrived on 27 September 2004, preceded by the single "Come in Out of the Rain" a week prior. The mini-album also featured a cover of Tim Hardin's "If I Were a Carpenter", and the original recording of "Forgiveness". Their eponymous debut album followed in March 2005, preceded by the re-recorded Top 50 single "Forgiveness" in late February. The album was released to generally positive reviews; at Metacritic, which assigns a normalised rating out of 100 reviews from mainstream critics, the album has received a generally favourable score of 81, based on 18 reviews. The album's second single was "Home", which was released in June 2005 but failed to chart. In early 2010, "Home" became the theme song for the fourth season of the United States TV series Big Love, replacing "God Only Knows" by The Beach Boys which ran from season one through three.

Later in 2005, Engineers recorded a version of Tim Buckley's "Song to the Siren" for the 2005 tribute album Dream Brother: The Songs of Tim and Jeff Buckley.

=== Three Fact Fader ===
Whilst in the process of mixing their follow-up album, the band split with Echo Records and their future became uncertain. After a period of silence, bassist/guitarist Mark Peters posted a message on the band's official forum in February 2008 that the second album would be released digitally in the first half of the year, and that the band members had been working in various side-projects apart from Engineers. The digital release of the album never came to fruition. On 29 August 2008, Peters posted a new message stating that one of the tracks from the second album, titled "Sometimes I Realise", had been remixed by DJ Sasha for inclusion on his album Invol2ver.

By 2009, the band signed with Snapper Music sub-label Kscope, and their second album Three Fact Fader was released on 6 July 2009. The album was released to further critical acclaim, with Drowned in Sound awarding the album an 8 out of 10 rating, as well as 4-star reviews from Gigwise, The Skinny, and The Times.

On 1 February 2010, it was announced that Dan McBean and Andrew Sweeney had left the band, with Peters noting, "No arguments or disagreements prompted anyone to leave, but when we got back together to play after Three Fact Fader was released it was clear we had all moved on personally and professionally." Shortly thereafter, it was announced that Phipps and Peters would continue with a new line-up, and musicians Ulrich Schnauss, Daniel Land (of the band Daniel Land & The Modern Painters), and Matthew Linley (of the band Gilbert) were added to the official line-up.

=== In Praise of More ===
Engineers' third studio album, and first album with the new line-up, entitled In Praise of More, was released by Kscope on 27 September 2010. The album was largely written and recorded by Mark Peters, with assistance from Dave Potter and Ulrich Schnauss. The album was released to generous critical acclaim; MusicOMH praised the album's "incredible melodies", SPIN magazine gave the album a 7/10 rating, and Clash Music called the album "a joy to behold" and stated that "In Praise of More has [the band] stripping back the density of previous releases, letting in a little warmth and allowing the songs [to] breathe, resulting in a broadening of their sound much to their benefit."

=== Always Returning ===
On 2 June 2014, after a brief silence following selected live dates, the band announced their fourth studio album, Always Returning. The album was set for release on 11 August 2014, and would be the band's first release with just Peters, Schnauss and Linley as the core members of the group. Of the lineup change, Peters confirmed that "based on mutual agreement after a recent conversation, we decided that Simon (Phipps) would sit this one out. There are no plans to tour this album, so Daniel (Land) wasn't needed either. As the band was essentially a solo project since 2009, no one has 'left' in the traditional sense – they're just not on this album."

== Band members ==
Current members

- Mark Peters (born 21 July 1975; Liverpool, England) – vocals, guitar, bass, keyboards (2003–present)
- Ulrich Schnauss (born 1977; Kiel, Germany) – keyboards (2010–present)
- Matthew Linley – drums (2010–present)

Former members

- Simon Phipps (born 29 December 1974; Basildon, Essex, England) – vocals, guitar, bass (2003–2014)
- Daniel Land (born 21 December 1980; Barnstaple, Devon, England) – bass, vocals (2010–2014)
- Dan MacBean (born September 1973; Salford, Lancashire, England) – bass, guitar (2003–2010)
- Andrew Sweeney (sometimes known as just "Sweeney") (born 6 November 1971; Ormskirk, Lancashire, England) – drums (2003–2010)

== Discography ==
=== Studio albums ===
| Year | Details | Peak chart positions |
| Year | Details | UK |
|---|---|---|
| 2005 | Engineers: Released: 7 March 2005; Label: Echo Records (ECHCD61); Format: CD, 2LP | 84 |
| 2009 | Three Fact Fader: Released: 6 July 2009; Label: Kscope (KSCOPE118); Format: CD | — |
| 2010 | In Praise of More: Released: 27 September 2010; Label: Kscope (KSCOPE160); Format: 2CD (includes bonus instrumentals disc) | — |
| 2014 | Always Returning: Released: 11 August 2014; Label: Kscope (KSCOPE295); Format: CD, 2CD (includes bonus instrumentals disc) | — |
| 2020 | Pictobug: Released: 7 September 2020; Label: Independent; Format: Digital Download | — |
"—" denotes a release that did not chart.

=== EPs ===
- Folly mini-album (27 September 2004) (ECHCD55, CD; ECHLP55, 12" vinyl)
  1. "A Given Right"
  2. "Forgiveness"
  3. "Come in Out of the Rain"
  4. "If I Were a Carpenter" (Tim Hardin cover)
  5. "Nature's Editing"
  6. "Pictobug"
- "To an Evergreen" EP (13 June 2011)
  1. "To an Evergreen" (Edit)
  2. "What It's Worth" (Helios Remix)
  3. "Twenty Paces" (Beroshima Remix)
  4. "In Praise of More" (Elika Remix)
  5. "Subtober" (North Atlantic Oscillation Remix)
  6. "Twenty Paces" (A Shoreline Dream Remix)
  7. "Hey You" (Pink Floyd cover)
  - Released as a digital download only.

=== Singles ===
- "Home" (25 April 2004) (ECSCD150, CD; comes in a die-cut 7"-sized sleeve; limited edition of 500)
  1. "Home"
  2. "New Horizons"
  3. "Home" (enhanced video)
- "Come in Out of the Rain" (20 September 2004) (ECS154, 7")
  1. "Come in Out of the Rain"
  2. "If I Were a Carpenter"
- "Forgiveness" (21 February 2005) (ECSCD159, CD; ECS159, 7") UK: No. 48
  1. "Forgiveness"
  2. "Stake to Glory"
  3. "Cats of Justice"
- "Home" (re-issue) (13 June 2005) (Netherlands CD EP, 113.0166.179)
  1. "Home"
  2. "Home" (Jagz Kooner Funhouse Remix)
  3. "Home" (Mogwai Wazzap Remix)
  4. "Home" (U-MYX enhanced section)
  5. "Home" (enhanced video)
  - Released as a digital download only in the UK. Originally planned for 7" (ECS166) and CD (ECSCD166). Was released in the Netherlands on the Play It Again Sam label.
- "Clean Coloured Wire" (20 July 2009)
  1. "Clean Coloured Wire" (Radio Edit)
  2. "Clean Coloured Wire" (SeriousMusic 438 kHz Mix)
  3. "Be What You Are" (Chicken Feed Remix)
  4. "Sometimes I Realise" (Steven Wilson Remix)
- "What Pushed Us Together" (7 December 2009)
  1. "What Pushed Us Together"
  2. "What Pushed Us Together" (A Ricardo Tobar Remix)
- "Subtober" (6 December 2010)
  1. "Subtober" (Single Edit)
  2. "Subtober" (North Atlantic Oscillation Remix)
  - Released as a digital download only.
- "Fight Or Flight" (28 July 2014)
  1. "Fight Or Flight"
  2. "Drive Your Car (Instrumental)"
  - Released as a digital download only.
- "A Million Voices" (19 January 2015) (KSCOPE704, 7")
  1. "A Million Voices"
  2. "Smoke and Mirrors (Demo)"
  - Released digitally with additional track "One Possible Ending."

=== Appearances on compilations ===
- "Song to the Siren" (Tim Buckley cover) on Dream Brother: The Songs of Tim and Jeff Buckley (31 January 2006).
- "Sometimes I Realise" (Sasha Remix) on Invol2ver by Sasha (8 September 2008).
- "Hey You" (Pink Floyd cover) on Mojo magazine's The Wall Re-Built, a 2CD re-recording of Pink Floyd's The Wall by various modern artists (January 2010).

=== Remixes and collaborations ===
- Bloc Party – "Blue Light" (Engineers 'Anti-Gravity' Remix) on Silent Alarm Remixed (2005)
- Viva Voce – "Alive With Pleasure" (Engineers Remix) on Alive With Pleasure EP (2005)
- Steven Wilson – "Abandoner" (Engineers Mix) on NSRGNTS RMXS (2009)
- North Atlantic Oscillation – "77 Hours" (Engineers Mix) on Grappling Hooks (Expanded Edition) (2011)
- Anathema – "Universal" (Engineers Remix) on Dreaming Light single (2011)
- Mark Peters & Elliot Ireland – "Deep Blue" (Engineers Remix) on Deep Blue Remixes EP (2016)

=== Television soundtracks ===
- "Home" was used on the soundtrack of Australian soap opera Neighbours, during the break-up of Steve and Miranda Parker's marriage.
- "Home" was used as the theme song for the fourth and fifth seasons of the United States TV series Big Love, replacing "God Only Knows" by The Beach Boys which ran from season one through three.
- "How Do You Say Goodbye?" was featured in the US original series The 4400, in the episode "Trial by Fire."
- "How Do You Say Goodbye?" was featured in the BBC comedy television series 'Gavin & Stacey', during Episode 7 of Series 2.
- "Clean Coloured Wire" was used in the Top Gear Middle East special.
