= E-girl and e-boy subculture =

Youth subculture

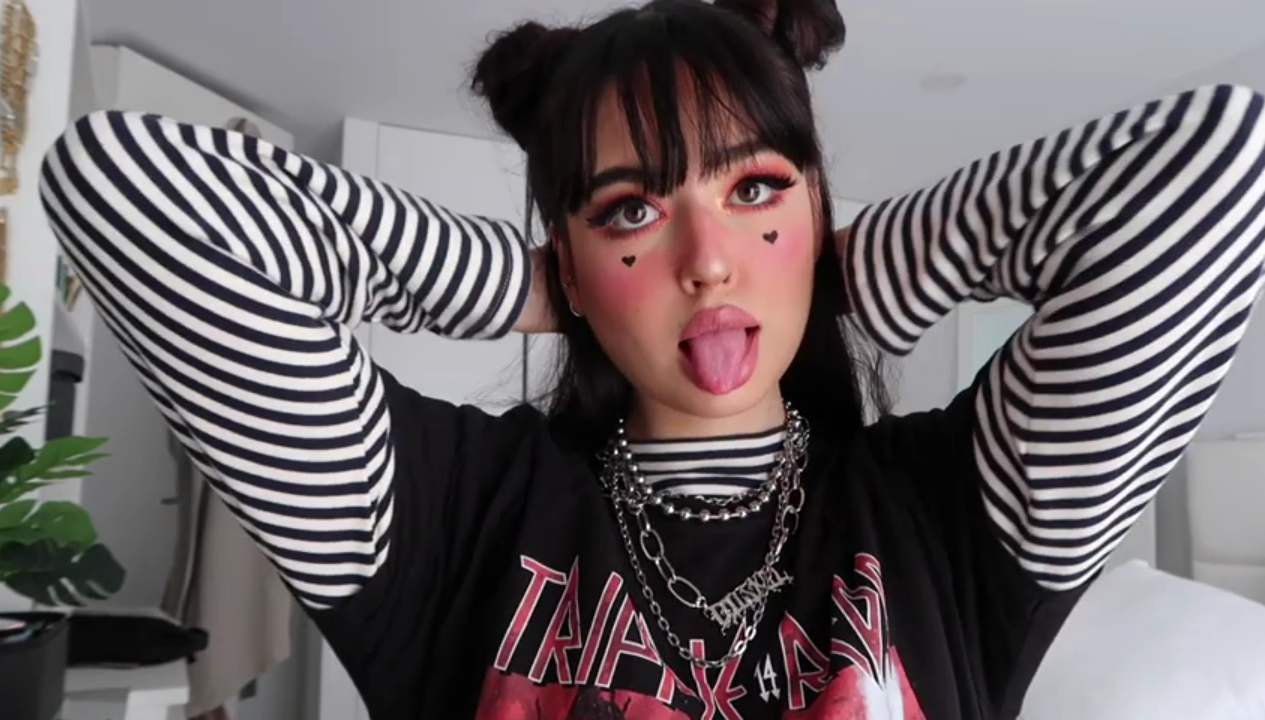
E-girl with typical fashion and makeup. Heavy eyeliner, small symbols applied to the face, and heavy blush are common.

E-girls and e-boys, sometimes collectively referred to as e-kids, are a youth subculture that emerged in the late 2010s, notably popularized by the video-sharing application TikTok. It is an evolution of emo, scene, and mall goth fashion, combined with Japanese and South Korean street fashion.

Videos by e-girls and e-boys tend to be flirtatious and, many times, overtly sexual. Eye-rolling and protruding tongues (a facial expression known as ahegao, imitating climaxing) are common.

According to Business Insider, the terms are not gender-specific, instead referring to two separate styles of fashion, stating that "While the e-boy is a vulnerable 'softboi' and embraces skate culture, the e-girl is cute and seemingly innocent".

== Etymology ==
The terms "e-girl" and "e-boy" are derived from "electronic girl" and "electronic boy" due to their association with the internet. The term "E-girl" was first used in the late-2000s as a pejorative against women perceived to be seeking out male attention online.

== History ==
=== Origins ===
According to an article by Business Insider, the earliest examples of e-girls were found on Tumblr, with Vice Media stating the subculture evolved out of the earlier emo and scene cultures. Vox writer Rebecca Jennings instead referred to the Tumblr aesthetic as a precursor of the subculture, as it lacked the cutesy aspect that would come to define e-girl hair and makeup.

Ruby Barry of Heatworld traces the origins of e-girl fashion to 2000s Japanese street fashion, including anime, kawaii and lolita fashion styles. Kayla Marci of Edited described it as an evolution of emo, scene and mall goth fashion that was heavily influenced by Asian fashion styles such as anime, cosplay and K-pop. i-D referred to Avril Lavigne as "the original e-girl" due to her polished take on alternative fashion, contrast to mainstream norms of the time and affinity for Japanese kawaii culture. Additionally, fictional characters such as Ramona Flowers, Harley Quinn and Sailor Moon were influential on the development of the subculture.

By the late-2010s, e-boys had split from this original all female culture, embracing elements of emo, mallgoth, and scene culture. The popularity and eventual death of emo rapper Lil Peep also influenced the beginnings of the subculture, with the New York Post describing him as "the patron musical saint of e-land". E-boys also make use of "soft-boy aesthetics" through presenting themselves as sensitive and vulnerable. According to the Brown Daily Herald this is due to a transformation of ideal male attractiveness from being traditionally masculine to embracing introvertedness, shyness, emotional vulnerability and androgyny.

=== Mainstream popularity ===
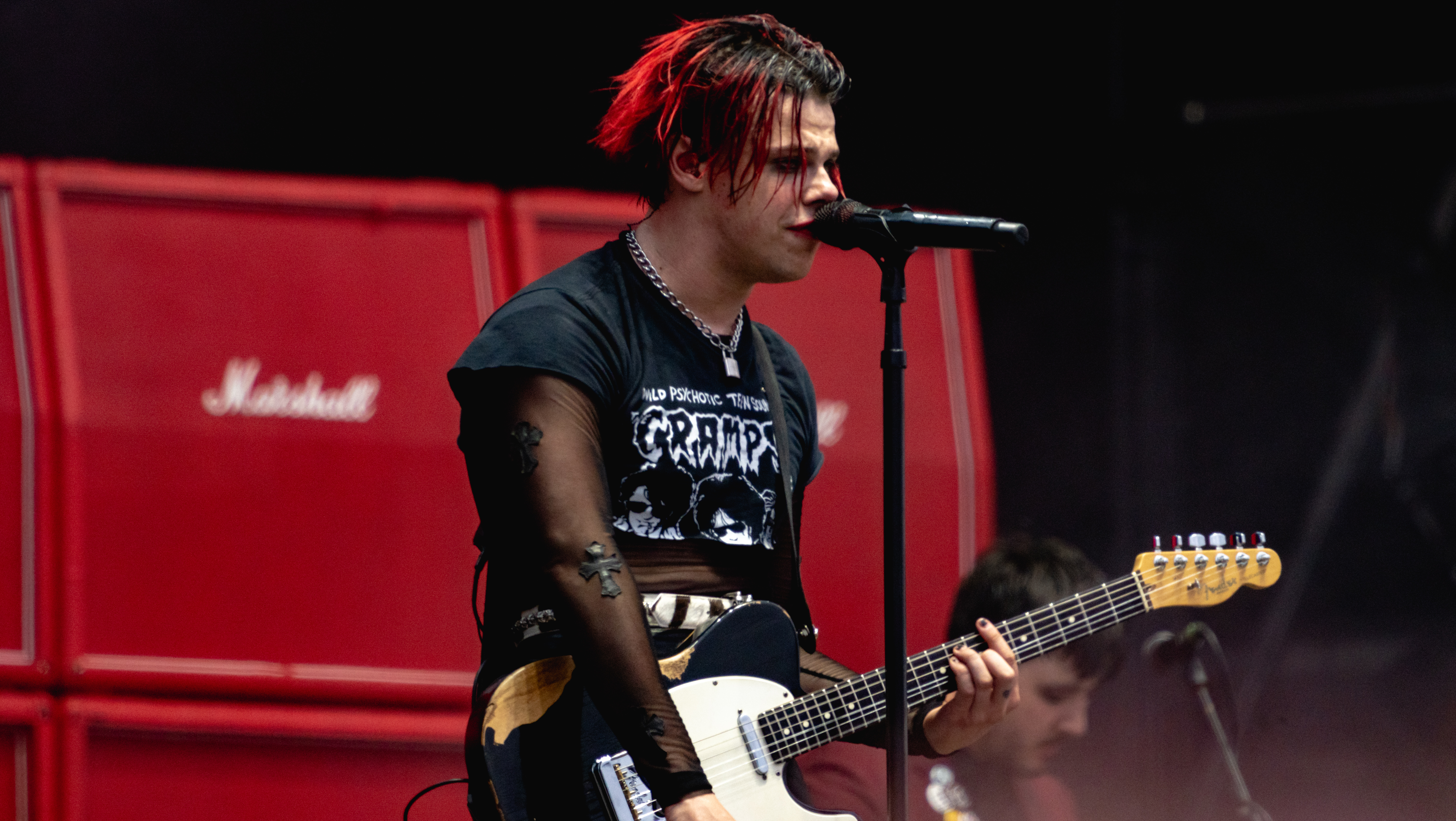
English musician Yungblud is an e-boy.

The subculture gained mainstream attention in 2018, following the worldwide release of TikTok. According to an article in i-D, the subculture's emergence on the app challenged the polished and edited photos of influencers and VSCO girls common on Instagram, due to TikTok lacking the features to do so. An article by CNN stated that "If VSCO girls are the sunshine-basking hippies of 2020, e-girls are the opposite". The subculture first began to gain mainstream attention in 2019. MEL Magazine attributed the subculture's popularity to the increased interest of K-Pop groups like BTS, Exo and Got7 in the Western mainstream, due to the two's similar style of dress and hair. A trend soon began on TikTok and other social media platforms, where people would upload videos "transforming" into an e-boy or e-girl, according to Vox Media, this is how the culture "entered the mainstream lexicon". In the summer of 2019, Belle Delphine's emerging online prominence helped bring attention to the e-girl subculture; Business Insider described Delphine as "a symbol of the first wave of e-girl". The July 2019 murder of Bianca Devins also brought attention to e-girls due to Devins' participation in the subculture.

The subculture continued to grow in prominence through 2020, with Vogue publishing an article featuring Doja Cat discussing e-girl makeup, and "e-girl style" being in the top 10 trending fashion terms on Google in the year. Additionally, a number of mainstream celebrities began to adopt the bleached stripes hairstyle associated with e-girls, including American socialite Kylie Jenner and Kosovar-English singer Dua Lipa. In July, high fashion designer Hedi Slimane released a preview of a collection called "the Dancing Kid" for Celine, influenced by the fashion of e-boys. In a July 29 article from GQ, fashion critic Rachel Tashjian referenced this as a sign that "TikTok is now driving fashion". Corpse Husband's song "E-Girls Are Ruining My Life!", which was released in September, gained large amounts of attention on TikTok, eventually charting in the UK Singles Chart for three weeks. In late 2020 and early 2021, a number of high fashion designers, namely Ludovic de Saint Sernin and Celine, began designing collections inspired by e-boy fashion. Both InStyle and Paper magazine credited e-boys and e-girls as important to the rise in popularity and resurgence of pop punk in the 2020s.

== Fashion ==
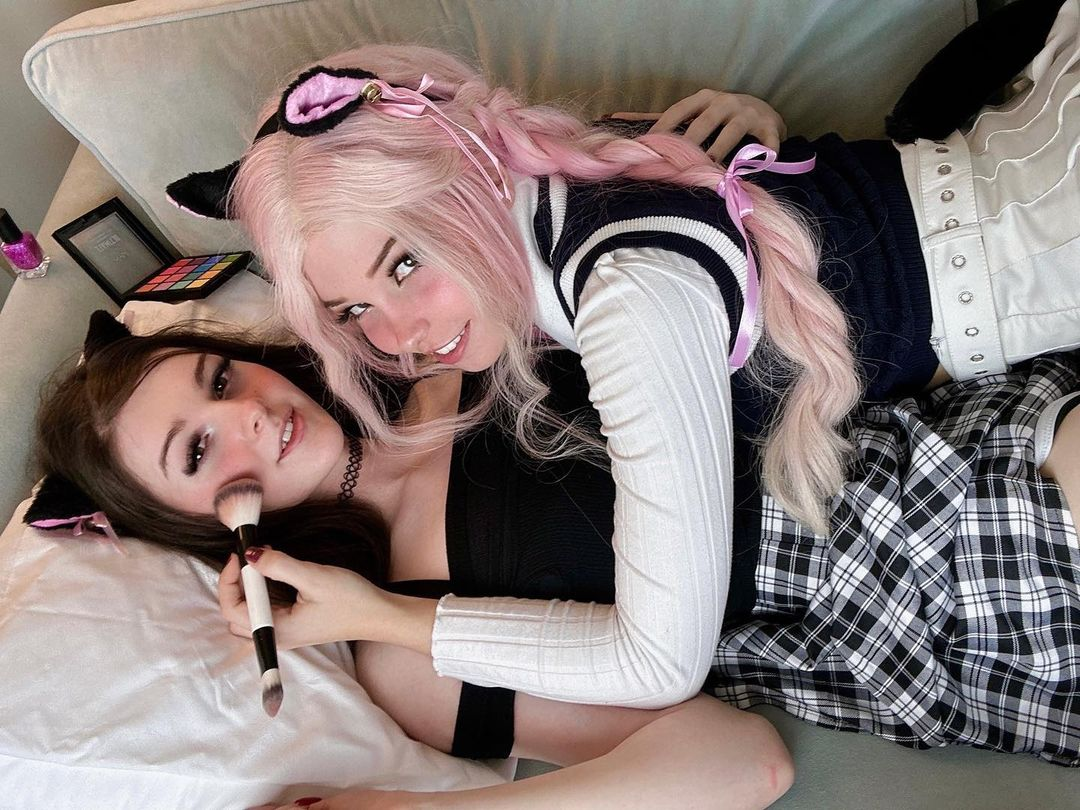
F1NN5TER and Belle Delphine, two online personalities known for their e-girl fashion aesthetics

The subculture's fashion is inspired by a number of prior subcultures, fashion trends and forms of entertainment, including mall goth, 1990s–2000s fashion, skater culture, anime, Japanese street fashion, cosplay, K-pop, BDSM, emo, scene, hip hop, and rave. Dazed described the aesthetic as "A little bit bondage, a little bit baby". Outfits commonly consist of baggy, thrifted clothes. In particular, some e-girls wear mesh shirts, plaid skirts, oversized t-shirts, crop tops, platform shoes, chokers and beanies, while e-boys wear oversized sweaters or monochrome clothes and band merchandise layered over long sleeve striped shirts, and polo necks. Chain necklaces, wallet chains and dangle earrings are also frequently worn. E-boys often wear curtained hair, whereas e-girls hair is dyed neon colors, often pink or blue, or is bleached blonde in the front. Some tie their hair into pigtails. Hair dyed two different colours down the centre (known as "split-dye hair") is common amongst both sexes.

Both boys and girls may wear heavy makeup, in particular pink blush on the cheeks and nose, imitating anime. Fake freckles, unkempt nail polish, and winged, heavy eye liner are common. YouTuber Jenna Marbles made a video imitating an e-girl's makeup style, calling it a mix between "Harajuku, emo, and igari makeup", the latter of which is a Japanese makeup style imitative of a hangover. Some e-girls draw over their philtrum using lipstick to make their lips look rounder. One notable element of e-girl makeup is under-eye stamps, often in a heart shape, a trend that has been influenced by Marina Diamandis. Discussion of mental health is also common.

== Music ==
E-boys and e-girls are associated with "Sad Boy" music, a broadly defined grouping of musicians who create music influenced by sadness and mental illness, as well as emo rap. The term has been criticized by artists such as James Blake due to its portrayal of mental illness, which he considers "unhealthy and problematic".

In the 2020s, it became common for participants of the subculture to listen to artists associated with the 2020s pop punk revival.

== See also ==
- Alt kid – Youth subculture
- Internet aesthetic – Visual styles and subcultures associated with the internet
- Internet culture – Culture that has emerged from the use of computer networks
- Clubbing (subculture) – Contemporary subculture
- Performative male – 2025 internet meme
- Scene (subculture) – Youth subculture
- Seapunk – Internet subculture
