= Finster =

Finster is a surname. Notable people with the surname include:

- Felix Finster, German mathematician
- Howard Finster, American artist
- Carl Hermann Arthur Finster, German diplomat and genealogist

== Fictional characters ==
- Baby-Face Finster, a criminal disguised as a baby in the Merrie Melodies animated short film Baby Buggy Bunny
- Finster, a villain in Mighty Morphin Power Rangers
- Chuckie Finster, Chaz Finster, Kira Finster and Kimi Finster from the animated Nickelodeon TV series Rugrats
- Lorraine Finster, a character from the TV show Will & Grace
- Miss Muriel P. Finster, assistant principal from the animated Disney TV series Recess
- Irwin Finster, a villain in the video game Wasteland

== See also ==
- F1NN5TER, Twitch streamer
- Fenster, surname
- Finsta (social media), a type of Instagram account
