= Belle Delphine =

British internet personality (born 1999)

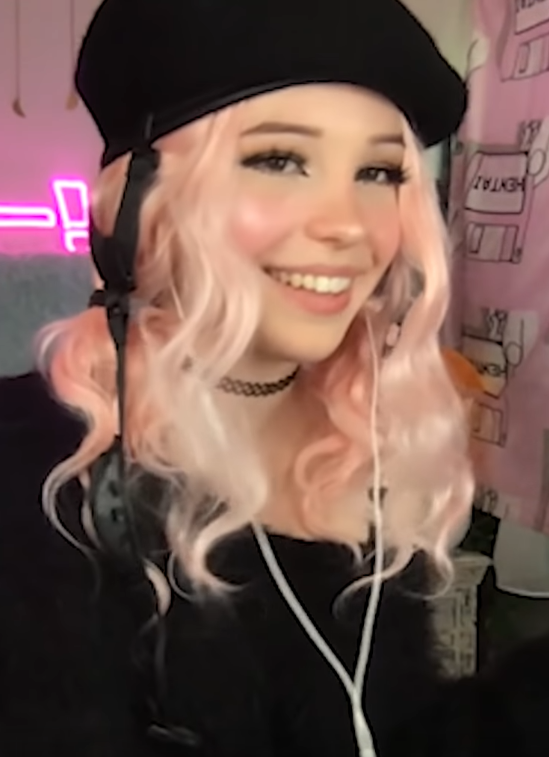
- Delphine in 2020
- Born: 1999 (age 26–27)
- Other name: Bunny Delphine
- Occupations: Media personality; pornographic film actress; model; YouTuber
- Years active: 2015–present (Note: Delphine has taken multiple months-long hiatuses from online content creation.); 2020–present (pornography) (Note: Satirical Pornhub account created in June 2019. OnlyFans created in June 2020 and first hardcore porn released in December 2020.)

YouTube information
- Channel: belle delphine
- Years active: 2016; 2018–present
- Genres: Beauty and makeup; music; vlog
- Subscribers: 2.04 million
- Views: 0 (Note: None of Belle Delphine's videos are available for public viewing. According to Social Blade, her views peaked in February 2024, at over 118.8 million.)
- Last updated: 2 November 2026

Belle Delphine (born 1999) is a British social media personality, pornographic film actress, model, and YouTuber. Her social media accounts feature erotic and cosplay modelling, sometimes blending the two. Her online persona began in 2018 through her cosplay modeling on Instagram. Her posts on the platform were often influenced by popular memes and trends.

In mid-2019, Delphine gained notoriety through creating a satirical Pornhub account and selling her "GamerGirl Bath Water" product through her online store. Shortly after, her Instagram account was deleted due to community guideline violations and she went on hiatus. Upon returning to online content creation, she launched an OnlyFans account on which she posts adult content and began uploading YouTube music videos that were markedly explicit.

Media outlets have described Delphine as an "e-girl" and a cross between an internet troll and a performance artist. Delphine has also been cited as an influence on the e-girl style commonly adopted by TikTok users.

== Early life ==
Delphine grew up in a devout Christian household in Cape Town, South Africa. After her parents divorced, she moved to England with her mother and settled in Lymington, Hampshire. As of December 2020, she was living in Hove, one of the two main parts of the city of Brighton and Hove. In her adolescence, she was "an avid watcher of the anti-political correctness genre of YouTubers like iDubbbz" and also enjoyed watching the parody character Filthy Frank online. She attended Priestlands School in Pennington, but dropped out at the age of 14 due to being bullied online. Delphine expressed that she was isolated by her classmates after they disseminated screenshots of her dark humour jokes. Around this time, she was treated for depression. She found work as a babysitter, barista, and waitress. She began posting "low-res and dimly lit" pictures of her cosplay on her Facebook account, which was later deleted.

== Online career ==
=== Early years and Instagram modelling ===
Delphine has had an Instagram account since 2015. In July 2016, she registered a YouTube account. The following month, she uploaded her first video, a makeup tutorial. In 2018, Delphine began to regularly upload pictures of her modelling on Instagram, using accessories such as pink wigs, thigh-high stockings, and cat ears to help create what she described as a "weird elf kitty girl" aesthetic. She also regularly produced cosplay-related content, which included characters such as Harley Quinn and D.Va. In March 2018, Delphine launched a Patreon account, where supporters could receive access to her "lewd" photosets. In September, she uploaded a second YouTube video featuring a tour of her room. Rolling Stone noted that her style in this second video is more in-line with that of the one she later adopted during her rise to prominence, which they described as "alien Disney princess porn star".

Delphine's popularity notably increased in the autumn of 2018. She "quickly rose to the top of the 'For You' page on TikTok", after participating in the platform's trends and challenges. Delphine's image was subsequently spread around 4chan and Reddit, where users praised her "ironic approach to online thotting" as "genius" and "brilliant performance art". Delphine's Instagram follower count surged from 850,000 in November 2018 to 4.2 million in July 2019. Her content began to notably and frequently include ahegao facial expressions, which are exaggerated expressions often featured in adult anime to signify an orgasm. Complex stated that she "posted clips of herself coyly eating a raw egg, shell and all. A scroll through her feed is just as likely to find colorful thirst traps as it is to see photos of her playing with a dead octopus".

As her popularity grew, Delphine began to draw controversy for her content. In January 2019, adult content creator Indigo White alleged that, while underage, Delphine passed off the photos of other sex workers as her own. A later February video, in which Delphine danced to a song about suicide while holding a gun, also drew controversy. Shortly after it was posted, false rumours of her death circulated online.

=== Pornhub account and GamerGirl Bath Water stunts ===
In June 2019, Delphine made a post on Instagram in which she promised to create a Pornhub account if the post reached 1 million likes. Pornhub responded to the post, calling it "the best news". The post quickly earned over 1.8 million likes; as promised, Delphine created a Pornhub account, to which she uploaded 12 videos. The videos were all troll videos that featured misleading titles and thumbnails and were not sexually explicit. Each of the videos received poor like-to-dislike ratios, ranging between 66% and 77% dislikes. Pornhub Insights published a statistics report detailing that Delphine's videos became the most-disliked in the website's history. One of the videos, titled "PewDiePie goes all the way Inside Belle Delphine", was a minute-long clip which featured "a cat ear-clad Delphine eating a picture of YouTuber PewDiePie, winking throughout". The video drew a similarly joking response from PewDiePie. Later in 2019, Delphine won the Top Celebrity Pornhub Award. In December, Pornhub's annual statistics report listed Delphine as the most-searched celebrity in 2019; "Belle Delphine" was also the site's fourth-most-searched term in general during the year.

On 1 July 2019, Delphine launched her online storefront, including a product dubbed "GamerGirl Bath Water." She announced the product on her Instagram account, where she posted an image of herself in a bathtub, with the caption "bath water for all you thirsty gamer boys." The product was marketed as the remains of her bath water in a jar and was priced at $30 (£24). Delphine stated that the idea for the product to sell her bath water came from continued fan comments on her photos saying they would drink her bath water. Upon initially selling the product, Delphine added the note: "This water is not for drinking and should only be used for sentimental purposes." The first run of the bath water sold out in three days. The product was met with controversy, media coverage, and Internet memes. Two days after the bath water product sold out, a website was created attempting to capitalize on its success, selling "GamerGirl Pee" for just under $10,000; this was confirmed not to be associated with Delphine. @BakeRises, a since-banned Twitter user, fabricated a headline alleging that Delphine's product caused a herpes outbreak, which was debunked. YouTube video responses also sprung up featuring individuals supposedly drinking, cooking, and vaping the bath water.

EJ Dickson of Rolling Stone noted that the response to Delphine's gamer girl bath water stunt from media outlets alternated between "deriding Delphine's fans for their naïveté and applauding her for her marketing savvy". Katie Bishop, writing for The Guardian, reported that the sale was "widely mocked". Patricia Hernandez of Polygon opined "What's curious about Delphine's side hustle here is that it seems to be a mixture of business and next-level performance art. In the video advertising the bath water, she outright calls this a stunt. And if you look at her wider Instagram oeuvre, Delphine's work is defined by her willingness to go there".

In response to her increased public exposure, Delphine was interviewed by The Guardian; she stated "I'm lucky. I can do crazy things and get to see the world react to it, and there's definitely enjoyment in that, even if it's sometimes a little scary. I get a bigger reaction to my weirder content but I think that's only possible because I also make risqué content". She added "I think it's been amazing and fun, but it's time to move on to new things. I have a diary next to my bed full of crazy ideas. I'm not sure what will top this, but I'm looking forward to seeing what will come next".

In May 2024, Delphine stated on X (formerly Twitter) that PayPal, which she had used to process the payments from selling jars of her bathwater in 2019, had frozen her account for violating its terms of service and withheld over $90,000 in proceeds from selling the bathwater from her for nearly five years, since each violation of PayPal's terms of service carried with it a $2,500 fine. Shortly after Delphine tweeted about the situation and several media outlets contacted PayPal about it, the company released the funds and returned the money to Delphine.

=== Instagram account ban and social media hiatus ===
On 19 July 2019, Delphine's Instagram account was banned. A spokesperson for Instagram stated that her account had violated the community guidelines, though the specific post or reason was not provided. At the time of the ban, her account had accumulated over 4.5 million followers, according to Business Insider and Social Blade. Business Insider reported that there "appeared to be a coordinated effort to report Delphine's account".

Delphine continued using her Patreon and Twitter accounts. At one point, her Patreon account had over 4,400 supporters. Polygon noted that "at least one man" spent $2,500 in exchange for a personal Skype conversation with Delphine. In late August, Delphine became inactive on her social media platforms, making many Patreon supporters believe they were being scammed out of previously promised upcoming content.

On 7 October 2019, Delphine tweeted an image of her mugshot, with a caption detailing that she was arrested. The image contained a "Metropolitan Police Service" watermark, although there was not any external proof of an arrest from the Metropolitan Police or otherwise. Delphine later stated that someone had stolen her pet hamster at a party and that she vandalised that person's car in retaliation, resulting in her arrest. Online publications and users questioned the authenticity of her claims, while the Metropolitan Police stated they were "unable to disclose any information" regarding the arrest due to the Data Protection Act. After she uploaded her fourth YouTube video in November 2019, Delphine took an online hiatus.

=== Transition to OnlyFans and pornographic content ===
In June 2020, Delphine returned to social media with a YouTube music video parodying the song "Gooba" by American rapper 6ix9ine. The video also promoted her newly launched Instagram, TikTok, and OnlyFans accounts. She was later banned from TikTok. The Spectator and Business Insider reported that her OnlyFans account draws in over $1.2 million (£1 million) per month. She uploaded "eat my ass", another music video in July, which also served as an announcement for "gamer girl"-branded condoms. In September, Delphine uploaded a music video for Doll.ia's "Plushie Gun" song, which featured her twerking, licking a razor blade, and playing with toy guns.

On 20 November, Delphine's YouTube channel was terminated without warning "due to multiple or severe violations of YouTube's policy on nudity or sexual content". This termination occurred almost immediately after Delphine's "Plushie Gun" video was removed for violating the platform's sexual content guidelines. Prior to this, many of her videos had been age-restricted for their adult content. Her channel had around 1.8 million subscribers and 78 million video views prior to its termination. The termination drew criticism from both Delphine and her fans, who questioned if there was a double standard between mainstream celebrities and independent content creators like Delphine. Her channel was shortly reinstated with YouTube attributing the termination to "a mistake by the review team". Around this time, Delphine started posting adult and explicit content on her Twitter account. Her erotic posing was often accompanied by gaming paraphernalia. She announced her venture into pornographic content through a music video on YouTube; titled "I'm Doing Porn", it featured her "[gyrating] for faux TikTok videos, wield[ing] a fake Uzi submachine gun, and splash[ing] around half naked in a kiddie pool". On 25 December, she uploaded her first homemade hardcore porn to her OnlyFans account.

In January 2021, Delphine posted images of a staged-kidnapping fantasy shoot on Twitter, which led to several users accusing her of promoting rape. Delphine defended her post, stating "there is nothing wrong with enjoying power-play and BDSM where both people are consensual". She took another hiatus from the Internet in 2021, sharing on Twitter that she "vowed never to do porn again," wanting instead to live in a cottage and travel. However, in April 2022, she resumed making online content. During a 2024 interview with Louis Theroux, Delphine once again expressed a desire to "disappear" from the internet, stating she is not interested in fame and once "it's run its course, I'll just leave it".

== Media reception and public image ==
=== Surrealist eroticism of content ===
Delphine's ahegao face attracted considerable online media attention.

Delphine's persona and content has garnered curiosity and scrutiny from online users and media outlets alike. Various outlets, including Business Insider, The Cut, Kotaku, and Polygon have described her as a "troll", and several instances of her activity online as "stunts". Many of those outlets also assert that Delphine's often erotic content has a satirical and ironic layer to it. Business Insider cited one fan response in particular, which likened Delphine to a "2019 Andy Warhol". Referring to her as "a surrealist troll that became too much for Instagram", the publication also ranked Delphine 89th on the 2019 edition of its UK Tech 100 list. The list's purpose is to feature the one-hundred "most interesting, innovative, and influential people shaping the UK tech scene".

The intentionally "weird" aspect of Delphine's social media presence has been often noted in media coverage of her. Alex Galbraith, writing for Complex, commented that her "exceptionally weird" stunts "seem to be satirizing the whole idea of sexiness". Writing for Vice, Kitty Guo described Delphine's humour as "tongue-in-cheek and deliberately gross-out", and commented that her modelling shots have a "slick glamour". Bishop wrote that Delphine "has successfully tapped into an online subculture by creating content that exists somewhere between Internet pranks and erotic modelling. For many of her followers, Delphine is a personality before she is a pornographic model". Aoife Wilson, Head of Video at Eurogamer commented positively on Delphine's online persona and content, asserting that "[Delphine] is an incredibly savvy businesswoman. She gained a huge online following through her love of cosplay and her ability to replicate real-life ahegao faces. She's kept that momentum going by engaging with her followers and trying new things, always skirting the line between sexy and surreal. She absolutely knows her audience".

Writing for Kotaku, Joshua Rivera opined that the overt sexuality in Delphine's content was presented satirically, "given her long list of stunts that all tend to subvert or toy with well-established fetish tropes". On the sexuality found in her social media posts, James Cook of The Telegraph commented on Delphine being "one of a new breed of mostly young social media celebrities to have found a way to harness obsessive, sexualised internet culture to make huge amounts of money", albeit in a "dubious fashion".

Delphine herself views her modelling as falling into the category of erotica, but in December 2020, when asked on if she considers her online activity as performance art, Delphine disputed the idea. Instead, she described her actions as "just jokes," and went on to say she enjoys "playing" around online, calling the internet "a really fun place to tease and mess around with".

Her content's use of themes from Japanese popular culture has also been examined. Originating in 1990s Japanese manga, the ahegao facial expression was specifically cited by media outlets for its frequency and prominence in Delphine's imagery. Business Insider stated Delphine was "most famous" for her ahegao photos, while The Spectator referred to her replication of the facial expression as her "break-out" online. Dickson wrote that the references to Japanese culture in Delphine's content have sparked criticism, as she has been "accused of racism and cultural appropriation in her cosplay, as well as capitalizing on the eroticisation of young girls". Conversely, Japanese adult performer Marica Hase stated "I see her manga characters as more of an homage and not racist".

=== E-girl and gamer girl persona ===
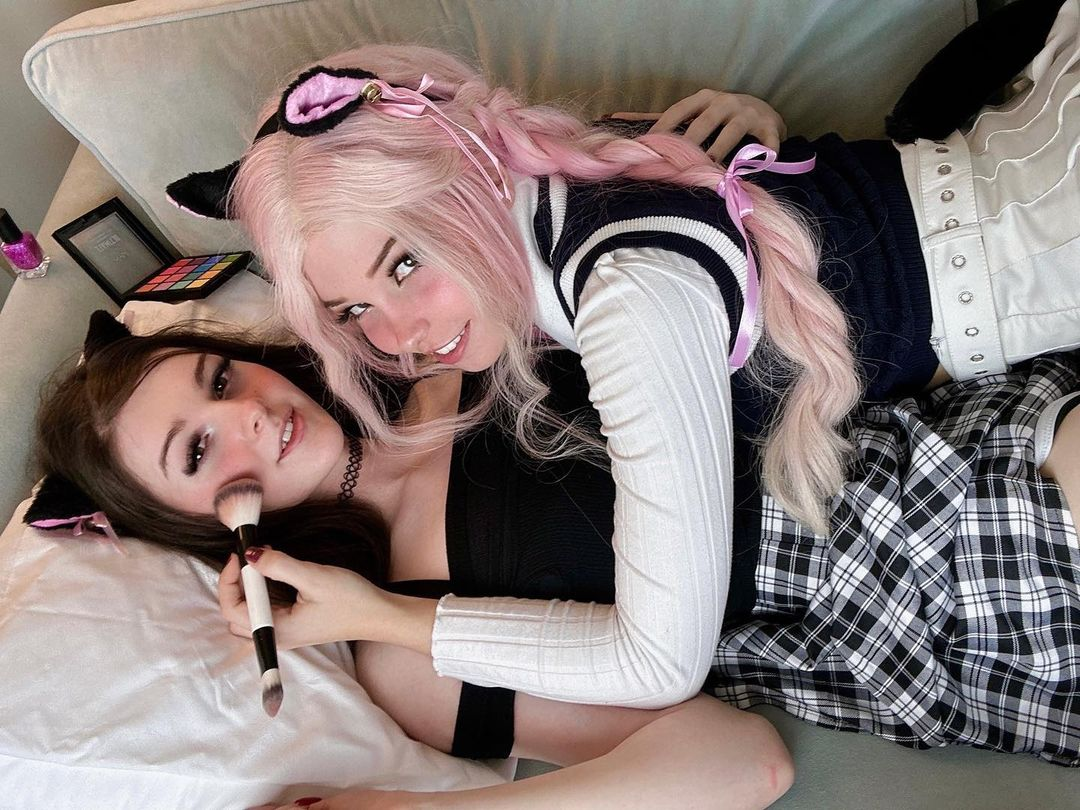
Delphine with F1NN5TER, another streamer known for his e-girl aesthetic

Her association with an e-girl image has been covered in the media, with publications having cited her as influencing the e-girl aesthetic commonly found on TikTok. Kotaku and Business Insider have described Delphine as a "peak self-aware e-girl", and as a figure that some may point to as "a symbol of the first wave of e-girl", respectively. Kitty Guo of Vice also noted that over time, Delphine "moulded herself into the platonic ideal of an e-girl," as her content began leaning more into "a carefully crafted pastel-fairy-princess-anime aesthetic". Guo also labelled Delphine as an "Extremely Online" person. Delphine's e-girl image has also been reviewed in academia; in an article for Television & New Media, Christine H. Tran wrote that "Delphine's self-sexualization and hyperfeminized image refuse the normative associations of game streaming as a masculinized profession," and stated that Delphine's career lent context to "storied ascent and reclamation" of the term e-girl.

Delphine's gamer girl image and her leaning into related tropes has also been acknowledged. On her polarising social media presence, London Evening Standard wrote that Delphine "has sparked a flurry of debate online, with fans branding her everything from a master manipulator to a harmful sexist stereotype of gamer girls". Madeleine Aggeler of The Cut concurred, commenting:

Delphine herself has become something of an online Rorschach test, a figure in whom people see either a brilliant performance artist making a scathing commentary on the expectations of women online or someone cravenly taking advantage of misogynistic tropes of women gamers and appropriating Japanese cosplay culture.

After the success of Delphine's bath water product, Rivera opined "even the notion of 'gamer girl bath water' plays with all manner of stereotypes about women in games and how some men see them: as mythical unicorns to lust after". Lela London, writing for The Telegraph, opined that "for women to truly escape gaming's gendered grip, we need to raise more non-fetishised Gamer Girls to the top. Belle Delphine is proof there is still quite a way to go". Rolling Stones's EJ Dickson described Delphine's posts as being more "bizarre" and "ridiculous", rather than "overtly sexual", and opined that "Such content appears to indicate that Delphine is leaning into—if not overtly parodying—the perception of the ideal girl as a hot, innocent young thing whose desire to play Fortnite is only eclipsed by her desire for nerdy gamer boy dick". Dickson also opined on why Delphine attracts much controversy, writing that:

Delphine markets herself as a 'gamer girl', which engages with a very specific stereotype about women in gaming. In the gaming community, there's a longstanding perception of female gamers as desperate attention-seekers who sexualise themselves to get more views and capitalise on horny dudes' desire for nerdy female counterparts.

== See also ==
- List of YouTubers
