= Mall goth =

Goth subculture

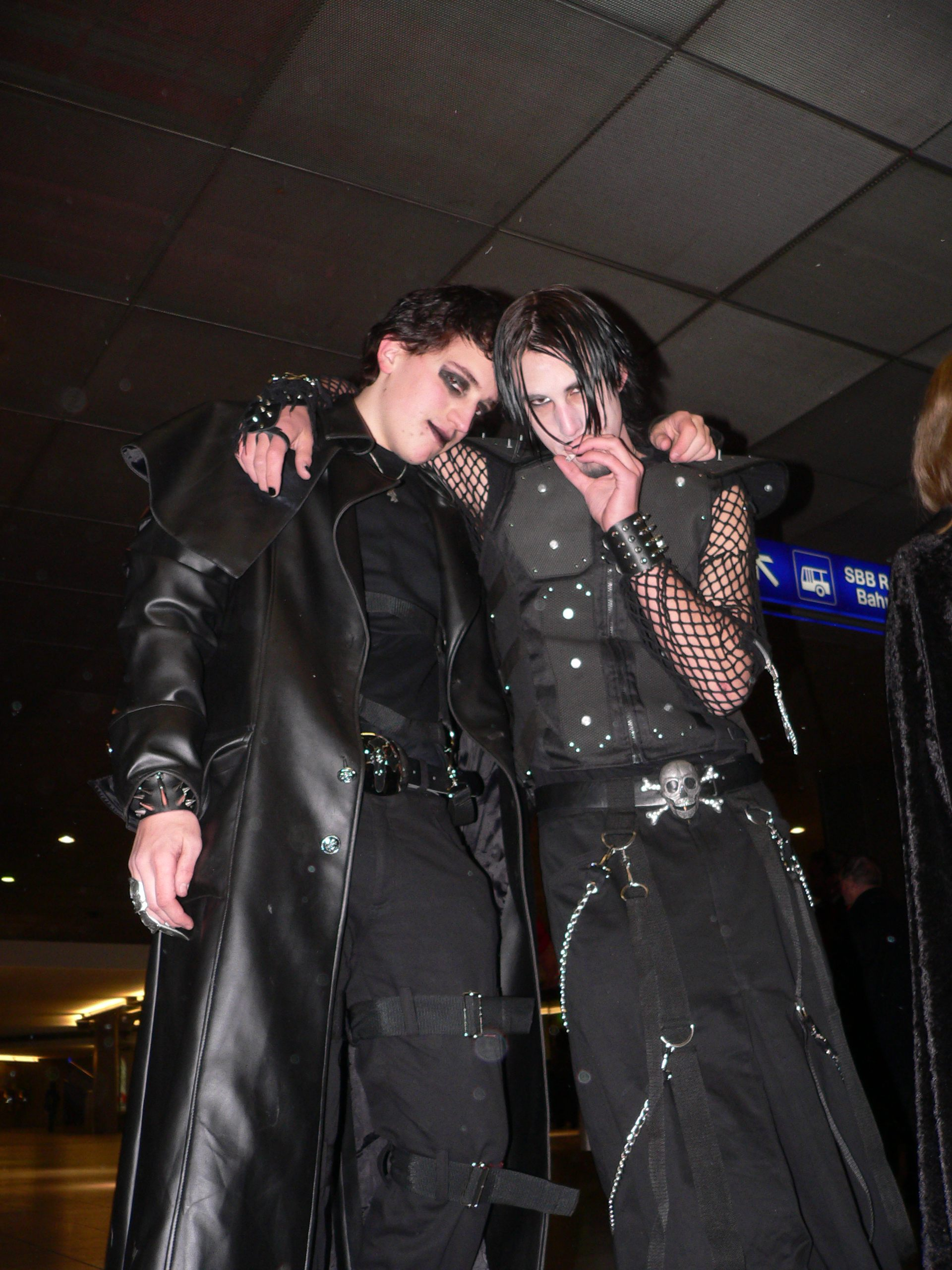
Mall goths in Basel in 2005

Mall goths (also known as spooky kids) are a subculture that began in the late-1990s in the United States. Originating as a pejorative to describe people who dressed goth for the fashion rather than culture, it eventually developed its own culture centred around nu metal, industrial metal, emo and the Hot Topic store chain. It has variously been described as a part of the goth subculture or as a separate subculture simply influenced by goth.

== History ==
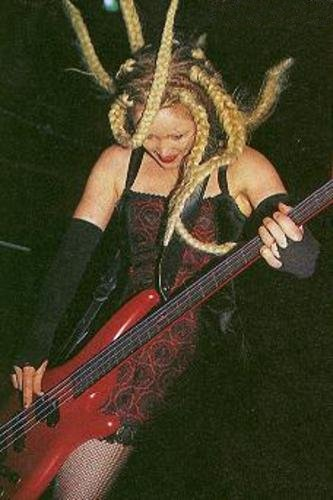
Coal Chamber is a popular mall goth band

=== Origins ===
"Mall goth" is derived from the words "mall" and "goth", referencing how many participants of the subculture would often spend time at shopping malls. In particular, it often references their buying of items from Hot Topic. The term began as pejorative, connoting solely being interested in goth for its fashion, rather than the subculture itself, similar to the use of poseur. Marilyn Manson and Amy Lee were influential upon the culture's development. According to writer Angelina Zaphyria on the website Adolescent, it began as a fusion of the cultures of the existing goth, third wave emo and nu metal movements, however according to Fashion writer Isabel Slone, it "combined the hallmarks of punk, goth and metal subcultures".

=== Popularity (late 1990s–mid 2000s) ===
In an article for The A.V. Club, writer Sean O'Neal credited The Crow as one of the main reasons for the subculture's popularity. At this time, mall goths often listened to nu metal bands like Korn, Slipknot, Kittie, and Mudvayne, and industrial metal bands like Rammstein, White Zombie and Marilyn Manson. During this period, animosity between mall goths and traditional goths was common. The conflict between the two cultures arose through many traditional goths perceiving mall goths to be simply interested in the fashion, and having little interest in gothic rock and the bands that spawned the subculture. Additionally, some goths considered mall goth to be a commercialisation of goth. In the early 2000s, mall goth gained further notoriety in the mainstream, and became increasingly associated with the emo subculture, emo pop music and groups such as My Chemical Romance. With the increased usage of the internet and social media, mall goths became frequent users of sites such as MySpace and Pure Volume.

=== Revival (late 2010s–present) ===
Although during its original popularity the subculture was mostly dominated by white people, the revival brought about an increased ethnic diversity, with people like Lil Uzi Vert and Aariana Philip becoming notable participants. To the extent that, in an article published on 22 May 2018 by Fashion, writer Isabel Slone cited Lil Uzi Vert's appearance at the 2018 Grammy Awards as "perhaps the most visible moment of the mall goth revival", through their wearing of bondage trousers and multiple wallet chains. MetalHammer writer Alice Pattillo credited Instagram accounts such as @1990smallgoth as a key part of the continued popularity of the subculture. During 2020, the subculture's popularity increased through trending videos on TikTok.

== Fashion ==
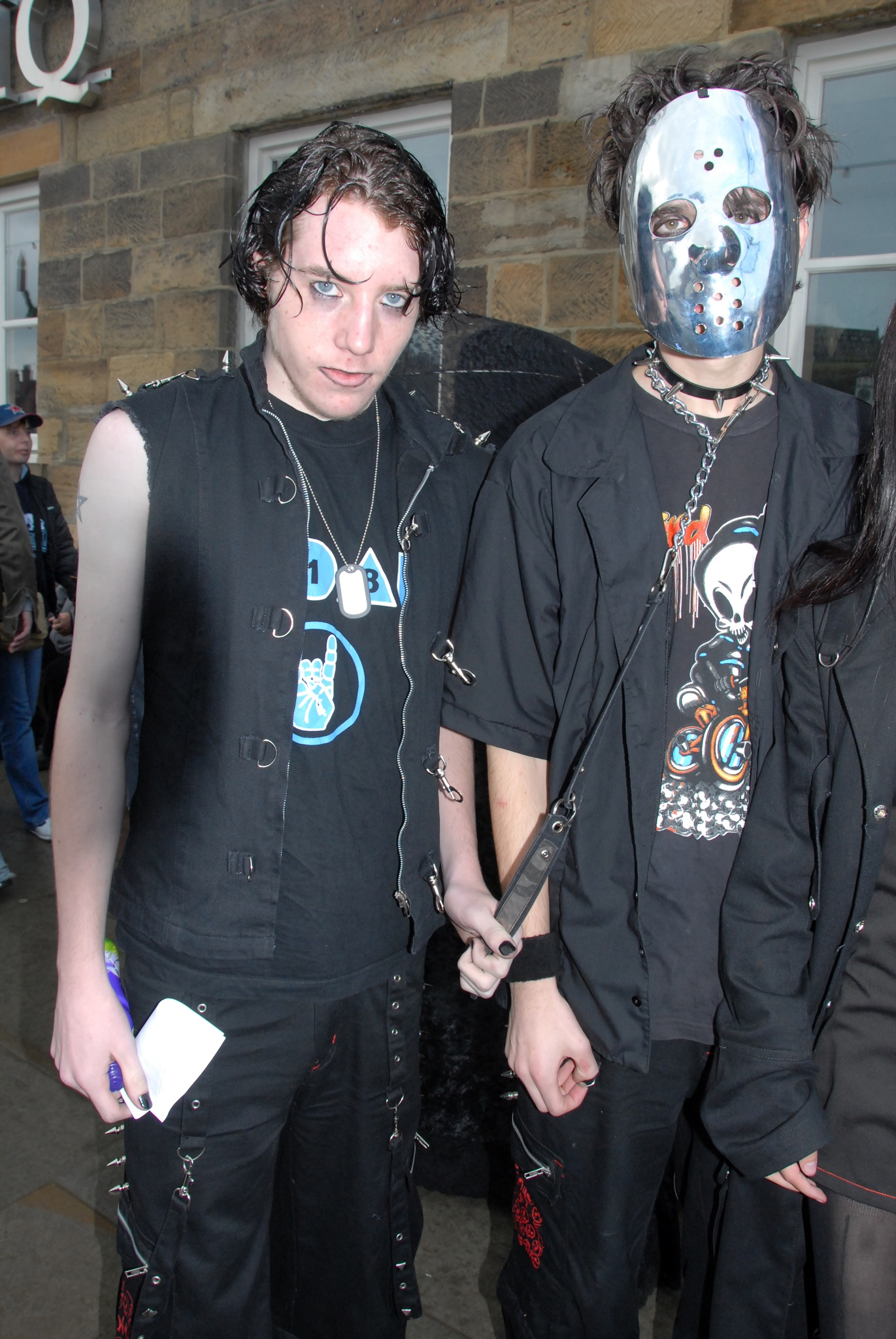
Two mall goths at Whitby Goth Weekend in 2006

Fashion items such as platform boots and oversized sweatshirts and trousers are common amongst mall goths, as well as striped and checkered prints. They are often associated with wearing brands such as Lip Service, Tripp, JNCO and Demonia. Chunky and platform sneakers were common, especially Buffalo. In an article for Elle, one former mall goth described that they wore "ankh necklace, combat boots over striped tights and did my eyeliner in a style that could only be described as raccoon-esque". Items such as pleather, chokers, creeper shoes and lip rings are all common. W writer Katherine Cusumano described Kristen Stewart's outfit on September 22 2016, of "bold swipe of black liquid liner, the deep reddish magenta under-eye liner, the slightly yellowed bleach job, and the padlocked necklace" as notably mall goth. In an article for Refinery29, Goth DJ and scholar Andi Harriman stated "Most Goths don't wear a lot of neon, face masks, or those over-the-knee stripy socks, basically anything Mall Goths wear".

Mall goths' hair is often dyed, particularly using Manic Panic dye. Sometimes hair is dyed two different colours. Some mall goths wear mullets.

During the subculture's revival, it became common for mall goths to wear baggy trousers contrasted with small tops. This look capitalised upon the "big pants, little shirt" fashion trend that was popular in the late 2010s and early 2020s.

== Influence ==
According to an article by WM Magazine, mall goth fashion was an influence upon the popularity of the normcore and scumbro fashion styles that became popular in the 2010s. Indie rock band Pale Waves' aesthetic is also influenced by mall goth.

In the mid-to-late 2010s, rappers such as Lil Peep and Lil Uzi Vert and singers Kim Petras and Benee began dressing in ways influenced by the fashion of mall goth. Additionally, a number of brands began creating fashion lines influenced by the subculture's fashion. In particular, Marc Jacobs' and Louis Vuitton's autumn 2016 collections, Dilara Findikoglu's collection from Spring 2018, Coach New York's pre-Autumn 2018 collection and Gypsy Sport's collection from autumn 2018, as well as a number of items from Open Ceremony from early 2018, all referenced the subculture. Additionally, mainstream celebrities such as Kanye West, Lorde, Kylie Jenner and Bella Hadid were photographed in mall goth outfits.

Mall goth influenced the fashion of the e-girls and e-boys subculture in the late 2010s and early 2020s.

== See also ==
- Cybergoth
- Rivethead
- Scene
