= Fenster =

Fenster is a surname, from the German language word for "window". Notable persons with this surname include:

- Della Dumbaugh, formerly Della Fenster, American historian of mathematics
- Aaron Fenster, Canadian engineer
- Ariel Fenster (born 1943), Canadian science promoter and lecturer at McGill University
- Boris Fenster (1916–1960), Russian dancer, choreographer and ballet master
- Darren Fenster (born 1978), American baseball player and coach
- Fred Fenster (born 1934), American metalsmith
- Gigi Fenster, South African-born New Zealand author, creative writing teacher and law lecturer
- Julie M. Fenster (born 1957), American author of historical articles and books
- Mark Fenster, American lawyer and author in Florida
- Saul Fenster, president of New Jersey Institute of Technology during 1978–2002
- Karol Martesko-Fenster, American media executive
- Leon Fenster, British artist

== Fictional characters ==
- Arch Fenster, a character in the American 1962–63 sitcom I'm Dickens, He's Fenster
- Fred Fenster, a character in the 1995 film The Usual Suspects

== Other uses ==
- Fenster (band), a German band
- Fenster, another name for a tectonic window (a geologic structure)
- Fenster School, American school in Catalina Foothills, Arizona
- Schnell Fenster, Australian band, active 1986–1992
- "Tausend Fenster", Austrian entry in the Eurovision Song Contest 1968
