= Quantum Web =

Studio album by Discovery Zone
- Released: March 8, 2024
- Length: 44:41
- Label: RVNG
- Producers: JJ Weihl; E.T.

Discovery Zone chronology
Remote Control (2020)	Quantum Web (2024)

Quantum Web is a studio album by American singer and producer JJ Weihl under the name Discovery Zone. It was released on March 8, 2024, through RVNG Intl.

== Background ==
Discovery Zone is a solo project of JJ Weihl. She was formerly a member of the band Fenster. Quantum Web is her second album, following Remote Control (2020). It was released on March 8, 2024, through RVNG Intl. Music videos were released for the tracks "Ur Eyes", "Mall of Luv", "All Dressed Up with Nowhere to Go", "Pair a Dice", and "Operating System".

An expanded edition of the album, titled Quantum Web EXP, was released on March 7, 2025, through RVNG Intl. and Mansions & Millions. Music videos were released for the tracks "Qw4nt0hmW3b" and "Supernatural (Extended)".

== Critical reception ==
Professional ratings
Review scores
Source	Rating
AllMusic	4/5 stars
The Guardian	3/5 stars

Timothy Monger of AllMusic commented that Quantum Web "expands on her debut's core sound, blending tech-nostalgia and dreamy ambience with some '80s zing and a quirky wistfulness." He added, "Weihl is a craftswoman with a knack for building intricate worlds that are unexpectedly fun to visit." Ben Beaumont-Thomas of The Guardian stated, "At her best, Weihl conjures the pasts we choose to remember but perhaps never even lived through – the collective fantasias of a culture in retreat from the horror of now." Joe Roberts of DJ Mag wrote, "Whether or not the title refers to this voyage of musical self-discovery, it's an engrossing, enjoyable trip to join Weihl on."

Bandcamp Daily included Quantum Web on its list of "The Best Albums of Winter 2024".

== Track listing ==
All tracks are written by JJ Weihl.

Quantum Web track listing
No.	Title	Length
1.	"Supernatural"	1:42
2.	"Pair a Dice"	4:25
3.	"Ur Eyes"	6:33
4.	"FYI"	3:49
5.	"Qubit Lite"	1:07
6.	"Test"	4:17
7.	"Out"	1:48
8.	"Operating System"	4:32
9.	"Mall of Luv"	4:01
10.	"Kite"	0:59
11.	"All Dressed Up with Nowhere to Go"	3:18
12.	"Undressed"	1:25
13.	"Qubit QT"	1:10
14.	"Keep It Lite"	4:34
15.	"Xrystal"	0:56
Total length:		44:41

== Personnel ==
Credits adapted from liner notes.

- JJ Weihl – performance, production, arrangement
- Lucas Chantre – intro (2), additional percussion (2), bass guitar on bridge (2), bridge arrangement (2), additional vocoder arrangement (3), additional synthesizer on bridge and chorus (4)
- Magnus Bang Olsen – guitar (3), bass guitar (3), additional synthesizer (3)
- E.T. – additional guitar (4, 11), sampler (15), production, arrangement, recording, mixing
- Jane Penny – flute (8, 11)
- Linda Fox – saxophone (9)
- Pedrum Siadatian – guitar (12)
- Heba Kadry – mastering
- Josh Bonati – lacquer cut
- Will Work for Good – artwork
- Andie Riekstina – back cover photography
