= GenderGP =

Transgender healthcare clinic, founded 2015

- Formation: 2015; 11 years ago
- Founders: Helen Webberley and Mike Webberley
- Location: Singapore
- Owner: GenderGP PTE Ltd.
- CEO: Unknown; Nick Imrie (formerly); Helen Webberley (formerly)

GenderGP is an online gender clinic founded in 2015 by English physicians Helen Webberley and Mike Webberley. It is based in Singapore and provides services worldwide. It has been the subject of controversy within the United Kingdom and regulatory actions have been taken against its founders.

== History ==
GenderGP was founded in 2015 by English physicians Helen Webberley and Mike Webberley as a private telemedicine service for gender-affirming care to transgender and gender-diverse patients following the concern of excessive waiting lists for an initial NHS assessment. The clinic provides worldwide access to gender-affirming healthcare as well as counselling services for patients and family members. Within the United Kingdom, the clinic was the only private provider of health care for transgender youth, where it was seen by some as the only available option due to lengthy waiting lists and uncertainty following the announced closure of the Tavistock clinic. In 2018, Helen Webberley was convicted of failing to register the service with a health regulator in Wales and fined £12,000. As a result of controversy surrounding the clinic's founders, ownership was transferred to Harland International of Hong Kong in 2019. GenderGP is registered in Singapore as of December 2022.

Alongside Susie Green, the former CEO of Mermaids, GenderGP launched a charitable fund in February 2023 to provide gender-affirming health care to young trans people through the clinic's services. Twitch streamer and gamer F1NN5TER donated $50,000 to the fund in May 2023. Green said that the donation would likely provide support for 24 people, with each individual receiving a year of free care.

The Telegraph published two investigative articles critical of GenderGP in February 2021. The first article reported that the clinic was willing to prescribe testosterone to an undercover reporter posing as a 15-year-old trans boy, without needing parental consent. The second article stated that two undercover reporters posing as the parents of a 12-year-old trans girl might be able to get a prescription for puberty blockers, following the reporters having two appointments with a counsellor and one with a doctor. Although the child was not present, the report also stated that the 12-year old would need to have a few appointments with a counsellor. Responding to the investigations, GenderGP said that its doctors had "the ultimate authority on all treatments", and that the clinic follows a "stage not age" approach, referring to stage of puberty, when providing health care to trans youth.

In February 2024, The Telegraph reported that the clinical commissioning group for south-east London had issued a safety alert advising doctors not to prescribe puberty blockers or gender-affirming hormone therapy on the advice of GenderGP, as the clinic did not "provide physiological or psychological support" to its patients.

In May 2024, GenderGP was criticised by Sir Andrew McFarlane in a High Court judgment. The case, which concerned issues of capacity to consent to treatment, was between the parents of a child who had been prescribed hormone treatment by GenderGP. The judge stated that there were "serious concerns as to the safety of patients accessing cross-hormone treatment from" GenderGP and that he "would urge any other court faced with a case involving Gender GP to proceed with extreme caution before exercising any power to approve or endorse treatment that that clinic may prescribe". Jacqueline Hewitt, a consultant paediatric endocrinologist in Australia, acting as an expert witness in the case, gave evidence that was highly critical of GenderGP. She testified that there was no physical examination of the patient, no skeletal bone age x-ray and bone densitometry investigation, a single "extremely poor quality" psychological assessment with an unregistered counsellor, "no record of counselling regarding the known risks of hormone treatment for gender dysphoria", and the prescribing of a dangerously high dose of testoterone.

Despite the company being registered in Singapore, it was reported on 4 December 2024 that it was restricted from providing teleconsultation services in the country as the doctors were not based in Singapore and also not registered with the medical authorities there. The access of the website within the country was also restricted by the Infocomm Media Development Authority.

== Suspension of founders ==
In May 2017, Helen Webberley, a general practitioner, was issued an interim suspension order by the General Medical Council (GMC), following complaints made about her clinical approach by clinicians at the Gender Identity Development Service. On appeal, the Medical Practitioners Tribunal Service (MPTS) found in 2022 that, while Webberley failed to provide adequate follow-up care to two patients, she was competent to provide treatment to trans youth and adults. The tribunal also found that her fitness to practice was impaired, saying she had failed to provide adequate advice to a 11-year-old patient about the risks to fertility arising from treatment. It suspended her from practice for a period of two months.

The tribunal findings were later overturned by the High Court, with Justice Robert Jay describing the tribunal's thinking as "confused, clearly wrong in places," and that it "omitted reference to important evidence." The ruling found that the allegation in the charge of failing to provide advice on the effects of fertility to the 11-year-old patient was unclear, as it did not state whether there was no discussion at all, or whether there was a discussion but it was not directly with the patient. It also found that the tribunal had erred by omitting reference to an email from Webberley's administrative assistant to the patient's mother. Although Jay had concerns about some aspects of Webberley's practice in relation to the patient, including that she should have discussed the risks to fertility directly with the patient, he said that "it is far from clear to me that what did take place should be strongly criticised." As a result of the appeal, Webberley was allowed to resume work as a doctor in the United Kingdom.

As a result of his wife's suspension in 2017, Mike Webberley, then a retired consultant gastroenterologist, took over care of the clinic's patients. In May 2019 the GMC issued an interim suspension order against him, stating that the care he provided "fell below the standards expected". A subsequent MPTS hearing found he had acted outside the limits of his expertise when providing treatment to seven transgender patients of GenderGP. Although the tribunal noted that he had not been subject to any previous disciplinary findings, it concluded that his conduct was incompatible with registration as a doctor, and struck his name from the medical register.

Helen Webberley's licence to practice was revoked by the General Medical Council on 19 July 2024 after she failed to comply with her legal obligation to revalidate her licence every five years.
