= Ahegao =

Facial expression, often with erotic meaning

Youtuber Belle Delphine doing an ahegao.

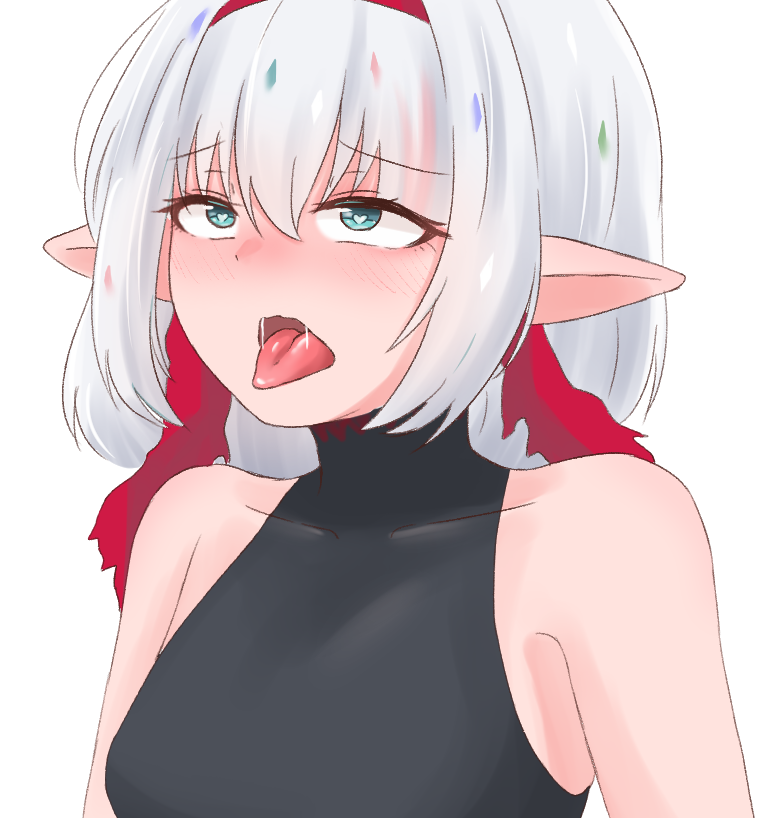
Ahegao facial expression

Ahegao (アヘ顔, Japanese pronunciation: [ahegao]) is a term in Japanese pornography, often used in erotic manga, anime (hentai), and video games (erogē), that describes a facial expression of characters—‌usually women—‌during either intense sexual arousal or orgasm, typically with rolling or crossed eyes, protruding tongue, drool, and slightly reddened face, to show enjoyment or ecstasy.

== Etymology ==
The first part of the term, ahe (katakana: アヘ), is an abbreviation for aheahe (アヘアヘ), an onomatopoeia for 'pant' or 'moan'. The second part, gao or kao (顔), means 'face'. Thus, ahegao can be interpreted as 'moaning or panting face'.

Many other terms have been coined for the facial expressions made at the moment of orgasm. One of these is ikigao (イキガオ) meaning 'coming [i.e., orgasmic] face'. Others are acmegao (アクメ顔) from the French loanword acmé (orgasm), and yogarigao (よがり顔) for "satisfaction face".

== Description ==
Typical characteristics are rolled or crossed eyes, a hanging tongue, and flustered cheeks. A character's overall face shape may also be distorted in ahegao scenes. An ahegao face of various levels of distortion is used to depict different grades of sexual arousal. Ahegao indicates that the pleasure experienced is so intense that the character loses control of their facial expression.

While ahegao is often used in pornographic manga, anime, and video games, it is not exclusively a term of hentai. A number of non-adult works feature ahegao faces.

== History ==
The term ahegao dates at least as far back as the early 2000s. Pornographic magazines used the word to describe the facial expressions of female live-action porn actresses during orgasm. In the same context, ahegao was used in some postings at 2Channel and its sister community for adult content, BBSPink, as well as in pornographic videos at adult e-commerce platforms in the early 2000s.

In the midst of the 2000s, use of the term increased, and the drawing style became rather conventionalized and started spreading throughout the otaku culture. In 2008, the first ahegao-themed doujin comics anthology, A-H-E, was released. In the 2010s, major publishers produced more ahegao-themed comic anthologies. By that time, the facial expression was featured in regular pornographic videos during the popularization of hentai fetishes in the real-life sex industry. Ahegao-like exaggerated facial expressions are also sometimes featured in other anime and manga works, in a non-sexual context. In September 2016, an "ahegao challenge" meme spread on social media websites, mostly via Instagram, which spread the trend in the United States.

Media Critic Kimi Rito claims that reasons for including ahegao in a scene include reflecting a character's joyful emotions such as ecstasy or pleasure, to show negative emotions such as fear or reluctance, or to show domination, submission and loyalty.

According to an article from adult gaming site Nutaku, ahegao in combination with the peace sign became an Internet meme in Japan, known as "ahegao double peace" (アヘ顔ダブルピース). Rito states that this version was usually used after a gang rape scene, either breaking the victim's spirit or as the final part of a humiliation scene. However, as this was limiting, the use of the ahegao double peace became more common as a joke. The term itself is credited as first appearing in a 2010 self-published video game called Futa Letter, in which the main character's girlfriend does an ahegao double peace in a video sent to her boyfriend after she is "broken" by his uncle. In 2018, Belle Delphine drew coverage from various media outlets for her Instagram modeling which often featured her ahegao expressions.

== Ahegao clothing ==
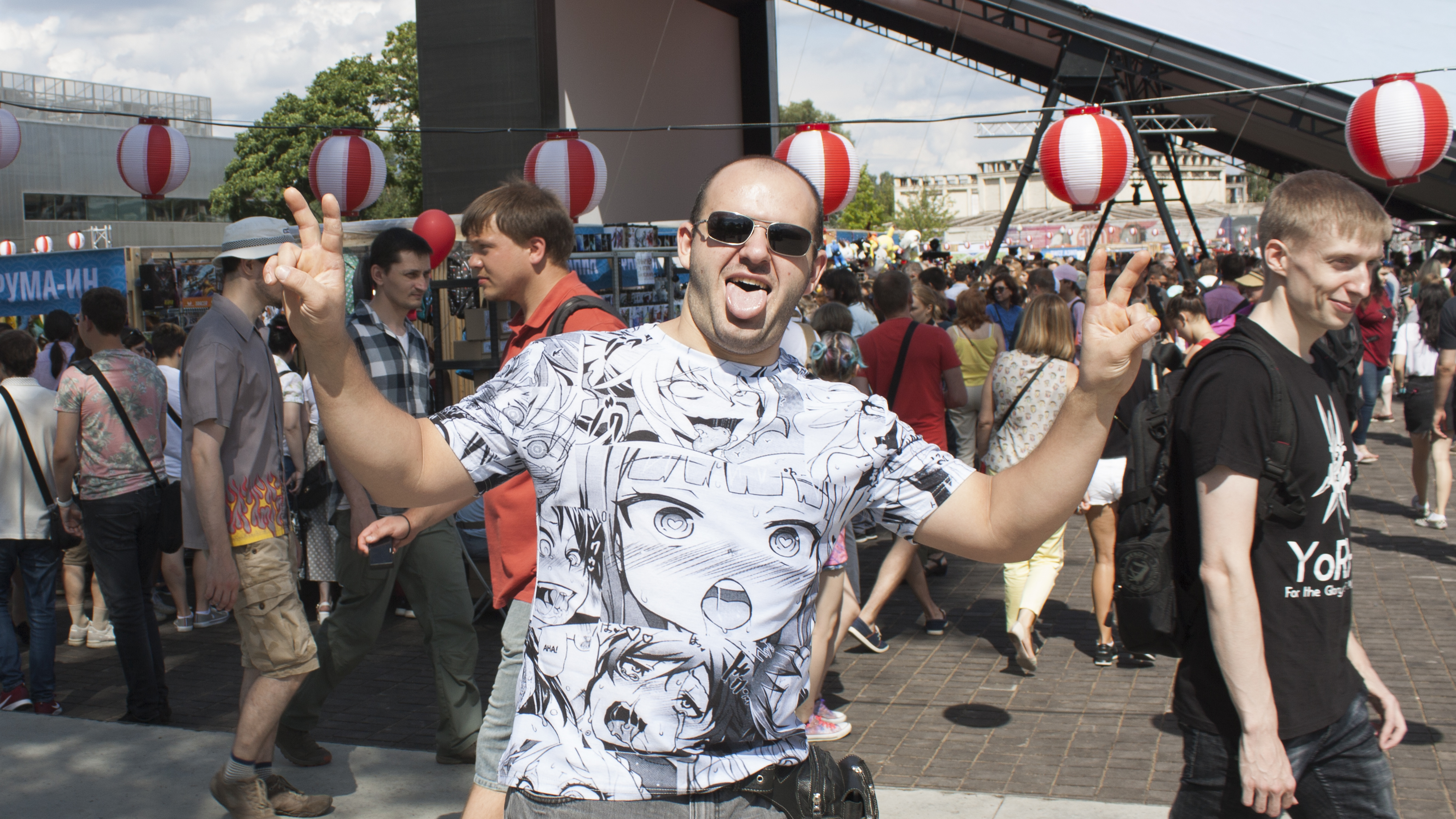
A man wearing an ahegao T-shirt

In 2015, an image by the hentai artist Hirame depicting various anime characters with the ahegao face circled the internet. Later that year, the pictures appeared on clothing. In May 2017, such images started appearing in western fashion, the clothes depicting among other works an image from the hentai Danke Dankei Revolution by Asanagi. This version is now sold by English-language hentai publisher FAKKU.

=== Ban of ahegao clothing ===
In January 2020, several anime conventions throughout the United States banned ahegao clothing on their grounds and forbade entry to those wearing such clothing. A similar movement also arose in Malaysia in 2022. Armageddon Expo in New Zealand also has an anti-ahegao-clothing policy in place and will refuse entry to people wearing said clothing, with stallholders also forbidden from selling it.

=== Trademark registration and lawsuit ===
The Chinese company Shenzhen Guangcai Trading filed a trademark registration for the term Ahegao in September 2018 and got approved by the United States Patent and Trademark Office on April 23, 2019. On July 27, 2020, Jacob Grady, the CEO of FAKKU, announced intent to contest the trademark registration and accused Shenzhen Guangcai Trading of using stolen artwork.
