= JJ Weihl =

American musician and filmmaker

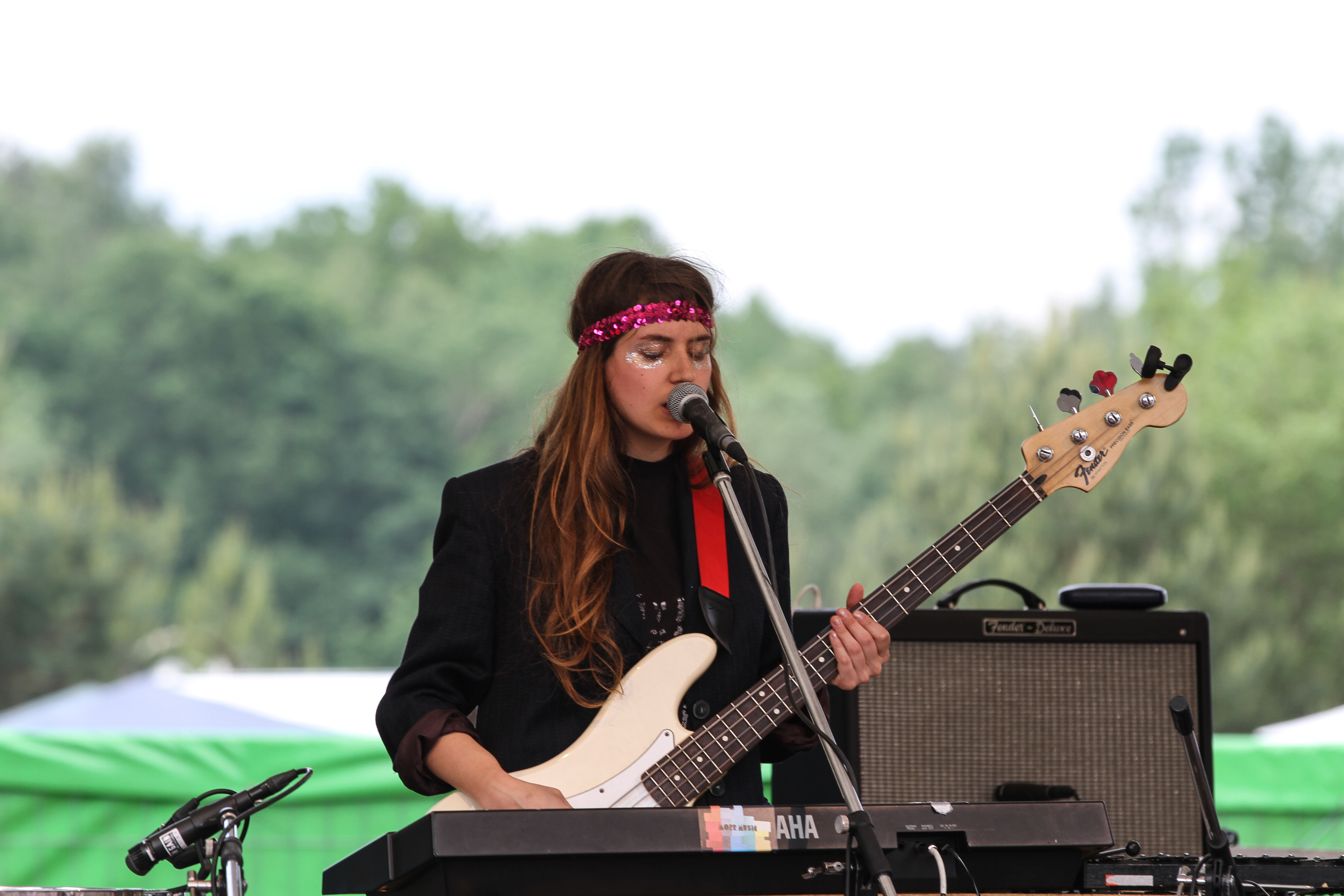
- JJ Weihl performing in 2013

Background information
- Also known as: Discovery Zone
- Born: New York, United States
- Occupations: Musician; multimedia artist; filmmaker; DJ; radio host
- Years active: 2020–present
- Labels: Mansions & Millions; RVNG Intl.
- Formerly of: Fenster

JJ Weihl, also known as Discovery Zone, is an American musician, multimedia artist, filmmaker, DJ, and former radio host.

== Biography ==
JJ Weihl was born and grew up in New York. She is a dual citizen of the United States and Germany.

She was a founding member and lead singer of the band Fenster.

In 2020, Weihl released Remote Control under the name Discovery Zone.

In 2024, she released the album Quantum Web.

She also released Library Copy Do Not Remove (2026).

== Discography ==
=== Studio albums ===
- Remote Control (as Discovery Zone; Mansions & Millions, 2020)
- Quantum Web (as Discovery Zone; RVNG Intl., 2024)
- Dreaming for Miles (with John Moods, as Discovery Zone & John Moods; Mansions & Millions, 2025)
- Library Copy Do Not Remove (as Discovery Zone; RVNG Intl., 2026)
