= Carl Hermann Arthur Finster =

German diplomat and author

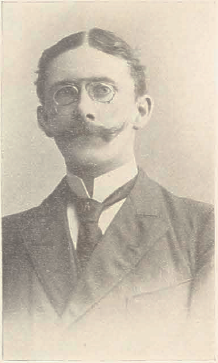
- Carl Hermann Arthur Finster
- Born: 25 March 1865; Breslau
- Died: 21 February 1929 (aged 63); Düsseldorf, Germany
- Known for: Diplomat
- Spouse: Auguste Wilhelmine Adele Leesemann

Carl Hermann Arthur Finster (25 March 1865 – 21 February 1929) known as CH, Arthur Finster served in the German diplomatic corps as a consulate secretary and as a reservist in the Imperial Prussian Army. He was awarded the Order of the Red Eagle, 4th Class c.1908. CH Arthur Finster was an author of a number of non-fiction books. He was a keen genealogist and from 1901 he appears in German genealogical journals relating to his consular postings and military career. An obituary for him appeared in the Blätter für fränkische Familienkunde.

== Career ==
Finster was born in Breslau on 25 March 1865.

In 1891 he moved to Pretoria as Consulate Secretary. In 1895 he moved to Amsterdam as Secretary of the Imperial German Consulate. In 1899 he became the Consulate Secretary in Sarajevo, Sofia (1903), and Genoa (1903–1907). He was First Secretary of the Imperial Consulate General in Genoa. Arthur retired from the Imperial Service on 1 May 1907. He joined the Mannesmann Pipe Mills in Düsseldorf on 1 April that year. He was then appointed as an authorised representative of the company on 13 September 1913.

In addition he became Second Lieutenant in the 39th Regiment of the Niederrhein Fusiliers. He was awarded Landwehr Dienstauszeichnung (Reserve and Territorial Army Service Award) Second Class (LD2) around this time. He was a Second Lieutenant in the Royal Prussian Army, and was awarded Landwehr Dienstauszeichnung (Reserve and Territorial Army Service Award) First Class (LD1) around this time.

In 1907 he became the Consulate secretary in Düsseldorf. He was promoted to First Lieutenant, 1908. Also awarded Order of the Red Eagle, 4th Class c.1908. He was still in the army in 1914, but no longer in service by 1916.

He was proposed as a member of the Verein für Heraldik, Genealogie und verwandte Wissenschaften.

Arthur Finster occupied himself with the study of German history, especially Silesian history, as well as heraldry and genealogy. He co-founded the Central Office for Personal and Family History in Leipzig and the West German Society for Family History in Cologne, and was a long-time member of the well-known ‘Herold’ (Berlin) and ‘Roland’ (Dresden) scholarly associations. For a number of years, he was a contributor to the Archive of Ancestry and Heraldry Studies. From Autumn 1919, he was the 2nd Chairman of the Düsseldorf Fencing Association (Fechterverband), a subordinate organisation of the Fencing Institute of the German Veterans’ Association (Fechtanstalt des Deutschen Kriegerbundes), and a board member of the German Officers’ Association's (Deutscher Offizierbund) Düsseldorf branch. From the end of 1920, he was an assessor of the Military Pension Court (Militärversorgungsgericht) in Düsseldorf, and a member of the Expert Committee at the Main Welfare Office for War-Affected Persons and War Survivors (Gutachterausschuss bei der Hauptfürsorgestelle für Kriegsbeschädigte und Kriegshinterbliebene) in Düsseldorf.

Carl Hermann Arthur Finster died on 21 February 1929 in Düsseldorf.

== English translation of The Finsters - From the Beginning of the 14th Century to the Present: A Genealogical Study ==
To mark the centenary of Arthur Finsters family history book a translation of the original 1921 work in German was translated to English and republished in 2021. C.H. Arthur Finster was inspired to write this history following the success of Max Finsters beautiful Finsters in Görlitz family tree, reproduced in this publication. The book briefly references:

- Landshut War of Succession (1504–1505). Cited as a reason for Finster family migration from Bavaria to Silesia due to devastation in the Bavarian Nordgau.
- Herero and Nama Genocide, Hermann Finster worked for Jantzen & Thormählen and was stationed in Africa. The Genocide is briefly referenced due to Hermann been injured.

This English edition includes a new Australian section by Lorraine Dooley, which adds the Australian story of the Finster family, from 1849 when Arthur Guido Finster emigrated from Görlitz, Germany to Melbourne, Australia.

== Publications ==
- Stammtafel der niederschlesischen Familie Finster Gottfriedscher Ast (Düsseldorf-Oberkassel, 1910)English title: Family tree of the Lower Silesian family Finster
- Die Finster von Beginn des XIV. Jahrhundert bis zur Gegenwart : eine familiengschichtliche Studie (Görlitz, 1921) English title: The Finsters from the Beginning of the 14th Century to the Present: A Family History Study
- Nachrichtenblatt des Familienverbandes der Finster und Finsterer (Görlitz, 1923) English title: News bulletin of the family association of Finster and Finsterer
