= Fenster School =

Defunct high school in Arizona, United States

Coordinates: 32°18′14″N 110°48′47″W

Location
- 8505 E Ocotillo Drive; Tucson, Arizona 85750

Information
- School type: Boarding school
- Closed: 2016
- CEEB code: 030480
- Accreditation: North Central Association of Colleges and Schools

The Fenster School of Southern Arizona was a school located in Catalina Foothills, Arizona, United States. Its college-preparatory curriculum offered students an opportunity to take courses for high school as well as towards college credit. Fenster School offered boarding and day student programs.

The school closed in 2016 and the campus is now home to Sabino Recovery Integrative Health and Wellness.

== Accreditation ==
The Fenster School was accredited by the North Central Association of Colleges and Schools.
