= Fenster (band) =

German dream pop band

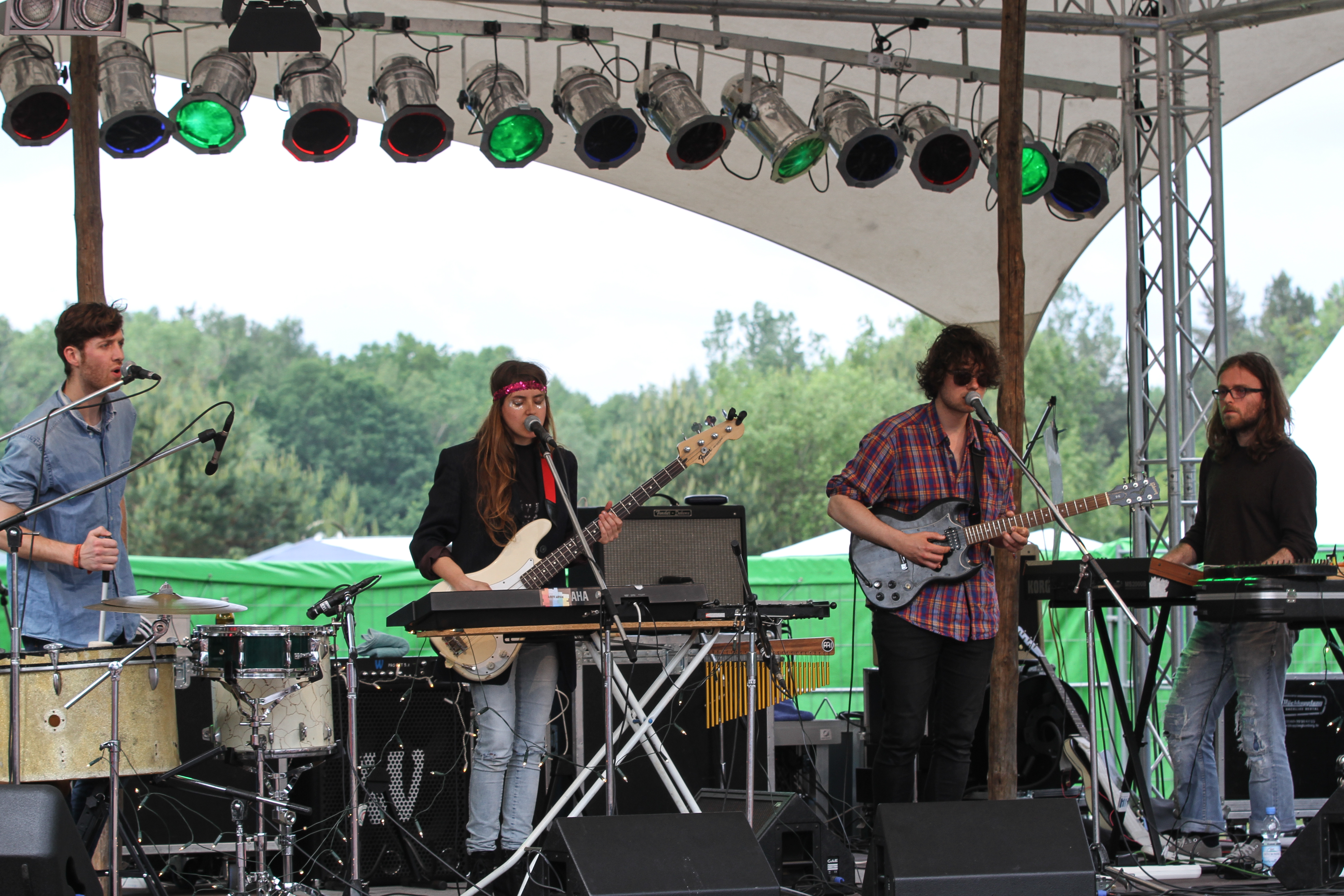
- Fenster performing in 2013

Background information
- Origin: Berlin, Germany
- Genre: Dream pop
- Years active: 2010–2018
- Labels: Morr Music; Altin Village & Mine
- Members: JJ Weihl; Jonathan Jarzyna; Lucas Chantre; Elias Hock
- Past members: Rémi Letournelle; Will Samson

Fenster was a German band from Berlin. Formed by JJ Weihl and Jonathan Jarzyna in 2010, the band released Bones (2012), The Pink Caves (2014), Emocean (2015), and The Room (2018).

== History ==
JJ Weihl, a native New Yorker, began creating music with Jonathan Jarzyna in Berlin. They formed Fenster in 2010. The band's name is German for "window".

In 2012, Fenster released its debut album, Bones. A follow-up album, The Pink Caves, was released in 2014. In 2015, the band released Emocean, a soundtrack to the film of the same name. In 2018, the band released another album, The Room.

== Members ==
- JJ Weihl (also known as Discovery Zone)
- Jonathan Jarzyna (also known as John Moods)
- Lucas Chantre (also known as Lucas Ufo and World Brain)
- Elias Hock

=== Past members ===
- Rémi Letournelle (also known as Slow Steve)
- Will Samson

== Discography ==
=== Studio albums ===
- Bones (Morr Music, 2012)
- The Pink Caves (Morr Music, 2014)
- The Room (Altin Village & Mine, 2018)

=== Soundtrack albums ===
- Emocean (Morr Music, 2015)
