= Nutaku =

Adult video game distribution platform

- Industry: Adult, Video games
- Founded: January 2015; 11 years ago
- Headquarters: Montreal, Quebec, Canada
- Products: PC Games; Online games; Free-to-play games; Downloadable games; Mobile games
- Owner: Aylo
- Website: nutaku.com (SFW); nutaku.net (NSFW)

Nutaku is a Canadian adult gaming platform owned by Aylo with primarily hentai games. Located in Montreal, Quebec, Nutaku offers games with mature content. The platform focuses on browser, downloadable and mobile games, offering microtransactions and purchasable options. As of early 2020, Nutaku had 50 million registered users. Nutaku offers a pool of 500+ free-to-play and paid titles of various genres, including action-adventure, massively multiplayer online game, real-time strategy, tower defense, dating sim, clicker, collectible card game, puzzle, turn-based strategy, strategy, visual novels, kinetic novels, and virtual reality.

== History ==
In December 2014, DMM partnered with Nutaku with the objective of marketing and publishing games to the western market. In January 2015, the platform was launched with four Japanese games that were translated for an English-speaking audience. Although they began with the release of card battle RPG Lord of Valkyrie Nutaku has rapidly expanded its selection to include online games of the card-battle, adventure, city building, and sim genres. It is particularly noted for its broad selection of translated Japanese erotic games.

In August 2015 an online version of Everlasting Summer with restored adult content was released on Nutaku. In November 2015 Nutaku announced the launch of an all-ages website.

In July 2016, Nutaku announced their partnership with Kimochi, a downloadable game client focused on the digital distribution of adult games from around the world. In early 2017, Nutaku released Android compatible version of some of their more popular games. In February 2017, Nutaku announced the launch of Kimochi Red Light, a new crowdfunding platform that's been set up exclusively to crowdfund adult games.

In June 2018, Nutaku held the Hentai Is Art art exhibit popup event in SoHo, New York. According to The Worley Gig, "At the Hentai Is Art pop up event, visitors were able to immerse themselves in the world of Hentai art with a range of styles and mediums to get turned on to. The ways in which Hentai is breaking into the mainstream—and helping to break down barriers—were showcased throughout the exhibit with virtual reality experiences, historically-inspired Hentai works, graffiti art, and a unique 'toy' showcase."

In 2019, Nutaku announced a $5 million investment in LGBTQ+ games. Nutaku first launched its LGBTQ+ games section in December of 2018 with the addition of Men Bang and Gay Harem.

In 2019, they also released items including a "Boob Console", a "Hentai Hot Sauce" and a gaming chair.

In 2020, Nutaku launched the website celebratehentai.com, an initiative to "put together a platform to showcase hentai, the many shapes and forms it comes in, and shed light on the wonders it has to offer".

In early 2021, Nutaku launched the #nowinutaku campaign a "series of safe-for-work advertisements that will reinforce the website’s position as a inclusive adult entertainment brand".
