= F1NN5TER =

English Twitch streamer (born 2000)

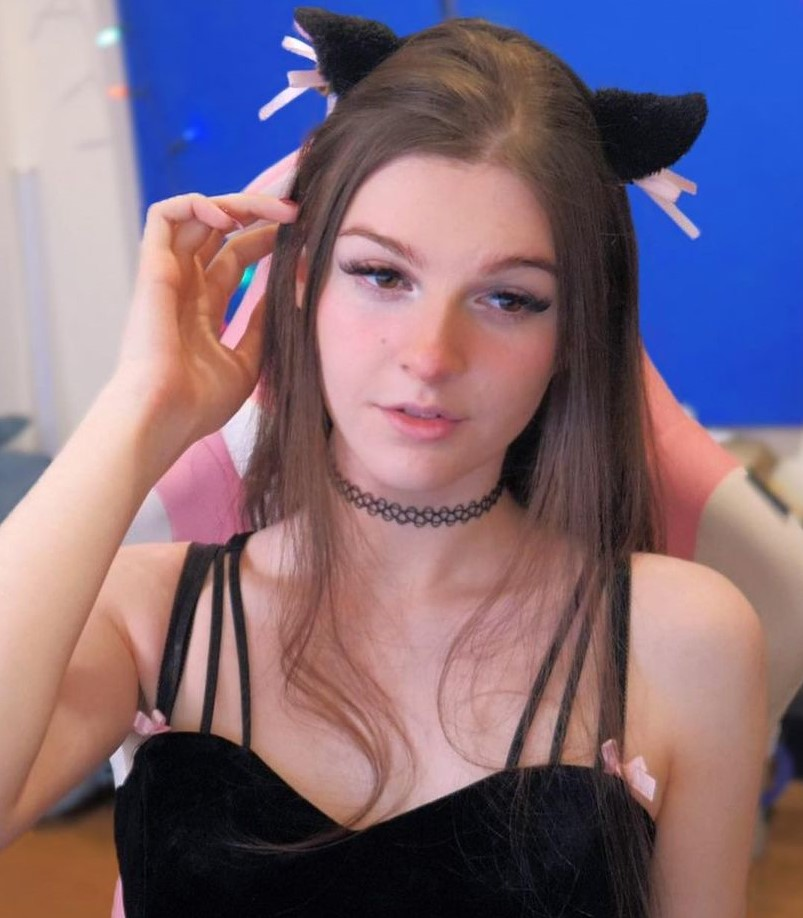
- F1NN5TER in December 2022
- Born: Jude (Note: F1NN5TER does not ordinarily provide his full name for privacy reasons.); 21 April 2000 (age 26); Birmingham, West Midlands, England
- Other names: Rose (e-girl persona), Finn
- Occupations: Twitch streamer; YouTuber

Twitch information
- Channel: F1NN5TER
- Genres: Gaming; chatting
- Game: Minecraft
- Followers: 1,468,420

YouTube information
- Channels: F1nn5terLIVE; F1NN5TER
- Years active: 2020–present; 2015–2023 (Minecraft channel)
- Subscribers: 663 thousand
- Views: 144.2 million
- Last updated: 29 March 2026

F1NN5TER (Note: /ˈfɪnstər/, like Finster. Sometimes rendered in lowercase; sometimes shortened to F1NN, F1nn, or Finn; sometimes spelled Finnster by third parties.) (born 21 April 2000) is an English Internet personality known for long-term cross-dressing. A Twitch streamer, TikToker, YouTuber, and OnlyFans model, he (Note: In his coming-out video, F1NN5TER says he is open to being referred to by any pronouns, but has a preference for he/him. His Twitter bio as of 4 April 2024 says "genderfluid (he/she)" and "her pronouns are he him". This article uses he/him for consistency.) began cross-dressing as a campaign in which he would dress as his e-girl persona Rose for a month if he received a certain amount of money in donations. He gained broader attention in 2023 when Twitch temporarily banned him for allegedly violating a policy usually applied only to women. Later in 2023, he donated $50,000 to the transgender medical care provider GenderGP together with a friend. In March 2024, he came out as genderfluid (preferring he/him) and shared that he had started feminising hormone replacement therapy, saying that after cross-dressing "[i]t felt a bit like I'd uncovered a part of myself that I had been purposely shutting down for as long as I could remember, and never questioned why."

== Streaming career and fundraising ==
F1NN5TER has streamed video games on YouTube and Twitch. He would sometimes crossplay as friends' Minecraft avatars as events, and later on-stream as an e-girl character named Rose. In 2020, he began a campaign called "Girl Week" (eventually "Girl Month"), in which he would dress as a girl for a month if he received a certain amount of money in donations. F1NN5TER grew his hair long and gained popularity on TikTok in clips where his e-girl aesthetic included long false eyelashes and thigh-highs adorned with bows. The "Girl Month" campaign resulted in years of cross-dressing and officially ended in 2023 with him explaining that it does not feel like "dressing as a girl" anymore, but rather just dressing like himself.

On 7 February 2023, F1NN5TER was suspended from Twitch for three days. While Twitch did not provide a reason publicly, F1NN5TER said that they privately said the ban was for "prolonged touching of female presenting breasts". F1NN5TER, who at the time identified as a cisgender man and a femboy, said that he had been adjusting his bra and opined that "As a man, touching your chest can now be bannable depending on how feminine Twitch sees you :)". According to GameRevolution, Twitch's rules for clothing have long been criticised as vague, and the platform also has a "Pools, Hot Tubs, and Beaches" category. Issy van der Velde of TheGamer criticised Twitch for "deciding a streamer's gender for them" and posed the converse question of whether a masculine-presenting woman would be exempt from the policy F1NN5TER was said to violate, also expressing concerns about how the rule would be applied to trans men. The case was later cited by Charlie Ferguson in the University of Pennsylvania Law Review as an example of how "attire can communicate a message about gender regardless of whether the wearer intended to share said message".

F1NN5TER announced an intention in December 2022 to donate to an organisation, and in May 2023 chose GenderGP, the only private provider of healthcare for transgender youth in the United Kingdom. He donated $50,000 together with a friend and viewer of his, TenMuses, which Watermark compared to Hbomberguy's fundraiser for Mermaids in 2019. In late March 2024, following the United Kingdom government's decision to ban puberty blockers, The Times published an article criticising the donation which also disclosed F1NN5TER's legal name and location without his consent — an act described by INTO magazine as a doxxing. F1NN5TER responded on X that he stood by the donation and would "happily pledge the entire donation amount again plus what was matched by my viewer at the time." He subsequently uploaded a YouTube video titled "I Got Doxxed," in which he announced that after further investigation he had concerns about GenderGP's business model and would redirect his next major donation toward a new non-profit of his own creation.

== Transition ==
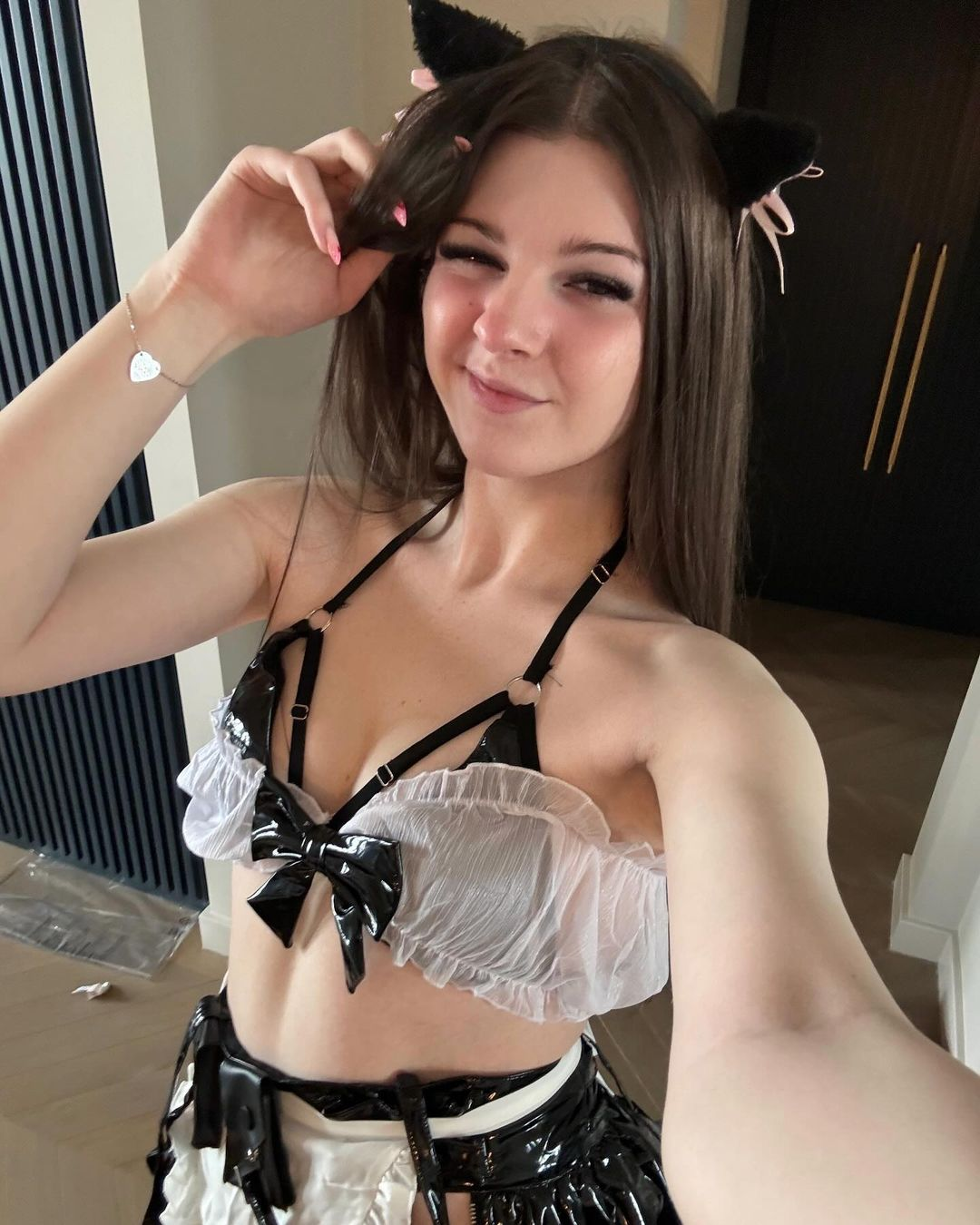
A selfie F1NN5TER posted in March 2024 to illustrate the effects of hormone replacement therapy

Many of F1NN5TER's followers viewed him as an egg (someone who has not yet realised they are transgender). He attracted many transgender followers who shared their experiences, which he said helped him better understand his gender over the course of two years.

On 1 March 2024, F1NN5TER uploaded a YouTube video titled "Coming Out", in which he explained that he had begun cross-dressing "for a 'meme'", but that his cross-dressing had attracted more trans viewers, and that through them he had learned more about the transgender community. He said that as he explored his gender, "It felt a bit like I'd uncovered a part of myself that I'd been purposely shutting down for as long as I could remember, and never questioned why." He said that he had been taking feminising hormone therapy and considered himself genderfluid, expressing openness to all third-person pronouns but personally preferring he/him. F1NN5TER added that he is bisexual and closed the video with brief conversations with his parents, who expressed their support. The video accumulated over 2.6 million views and was described by INTO as one of the most-watched creator coming-out videos of 2024. In June 2024, INTO magazine included F1NN5TER in its annual "25 Under 25" list of queer changemakers, recognising his coming-out video and his charitable support for trans healthcare in the United Kingdom.

In early 2026, F1NN5TER announced he would be undergoing facial feminization surgery (FFS), and subsequently documented his recovery in a YouTube video uploaded in March 2026 titled "Talking about my Facial Feminization Surgery."

For a time, F1NN5TER dated another transfeminine content creator, Icky, who described the pair as a "one-two punch", with his videos leading people to her videos on practical aspects of transitioning. The pair's streaming led to parasocial issues in how fans perceived their relationship.

== Other endeavours ==
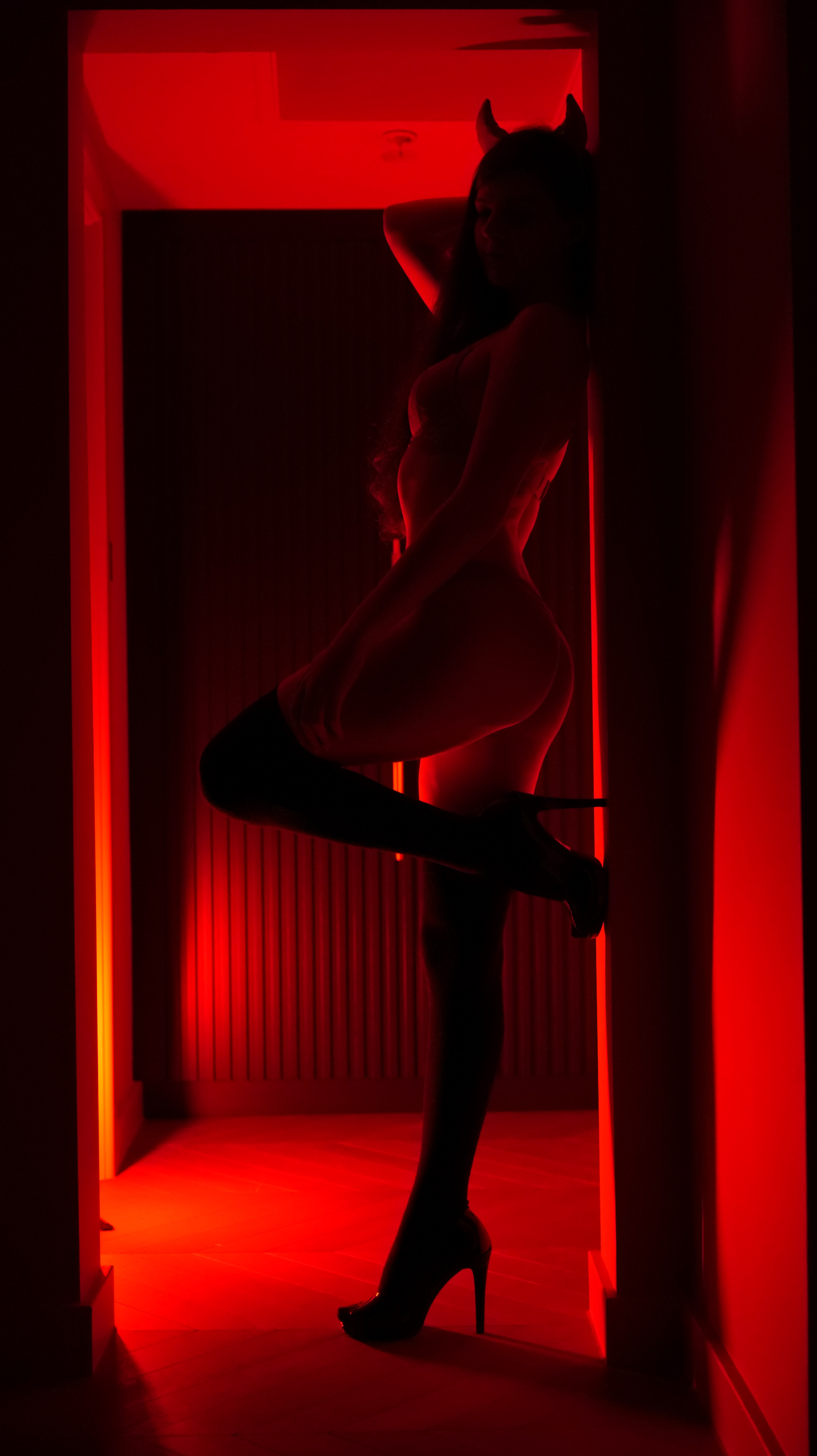
A modelling photo of F1NN5TER

In season 2 of the MC Championship, a Minecraft tournament, F1NN5TER was on the winning team in events 16 (August 2021) and 23 (July 2022).

The same week as his 2023 Twitch ban, F1NN5TER was quoted on the feminist website The Mary Sue for what he said in response to the criticism of men wearing women's clothing that was expressed by the right-wing advocacy group PragerU: "But what if it's reeeeaaallly fun".

In addition to his streaming career, F1NN5TER is a model on the online video chat platform OnlyFans. He reached the site's top 0.01% in his first week on the platform. After starting his OnlyFans modelling, he stopped doing Minecraft streams, to avoid attracting a younger audience for whom his adult content would be inappropriate.

=== Anne Healthcare ===
In November 2025, F1NN5TER revealed he was involved in establishing non-profit private trans healthcare provider Anne Healthcare in the United Kingdom, having provided early financial support during the organisation's founding in 2024. Anne Healthcare confirmed in a statement published alongside F1NN5TER's announcement video that his contribution had secured the organisation's first prescriber, stating that the clinic "would not have happened without the money F1NN5TER contributed." Co-founder and Joint CEO Lizzie Jordan said that his support had been provided "at a critical moment when we were struggling to find medical professionals willing to work with under-18s and faced resistance from traditional funding sources." A Christmas fundraiser associated with the announcement raised £35,804, more than twice its £15,000 target. The organisation provides private hormone replacement therapy prescriptions, mental health support, and surgery referrals for trans adults and young people, and reported subsidising 97 patients' care in 2025.

The announcement was divisive within the trans community. While many praised F1NN5TER's support, others criticised Anne Healthcare's pricing model — which includes a one-off setup fee of £200 and a sliding-scale monthly membership — as too expensive, with some characterising it as exploitative. F1NN5TER told PinkNews that he had anticipated criticism from right-wing commentators regarding the clinic's provision of services to trans youth, but was surprised by the nature and source of the actual response: "We were expecting an awful lot more of people on the right-wing side of things critiquing the services [Anne Health] caters for trans youth. That's what we were preparing for." He attributed much of the negative reaction to misunderstandings about the service's model, particularly among audiences unfamiliar with how private healthcare operates in the United Kingdom. Jordan said she understood why trans people were "angry and frustrated" at private healthcare more broadly, but argued that the service filled a gap left by NHS wait times, which a QueerAF report had found extended to over 200 years at some gender clinics. Jordan stated: "What we provide should be available free at the point of access via the NHS. We would love nothing more than not needing to do what we're doing."
