= Wallet chain =

Fashion-related item

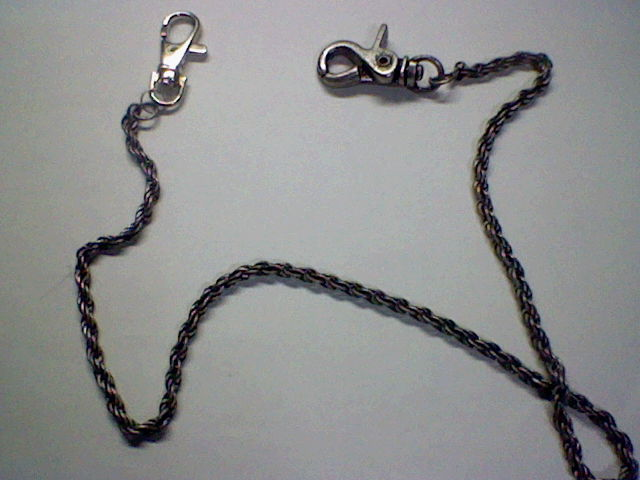
A wallet chain

A wallet chain is a fashion accessory consisting of a chain worn from a belt loop, originally used to hold the wearer's wallet.

== History and usage ==
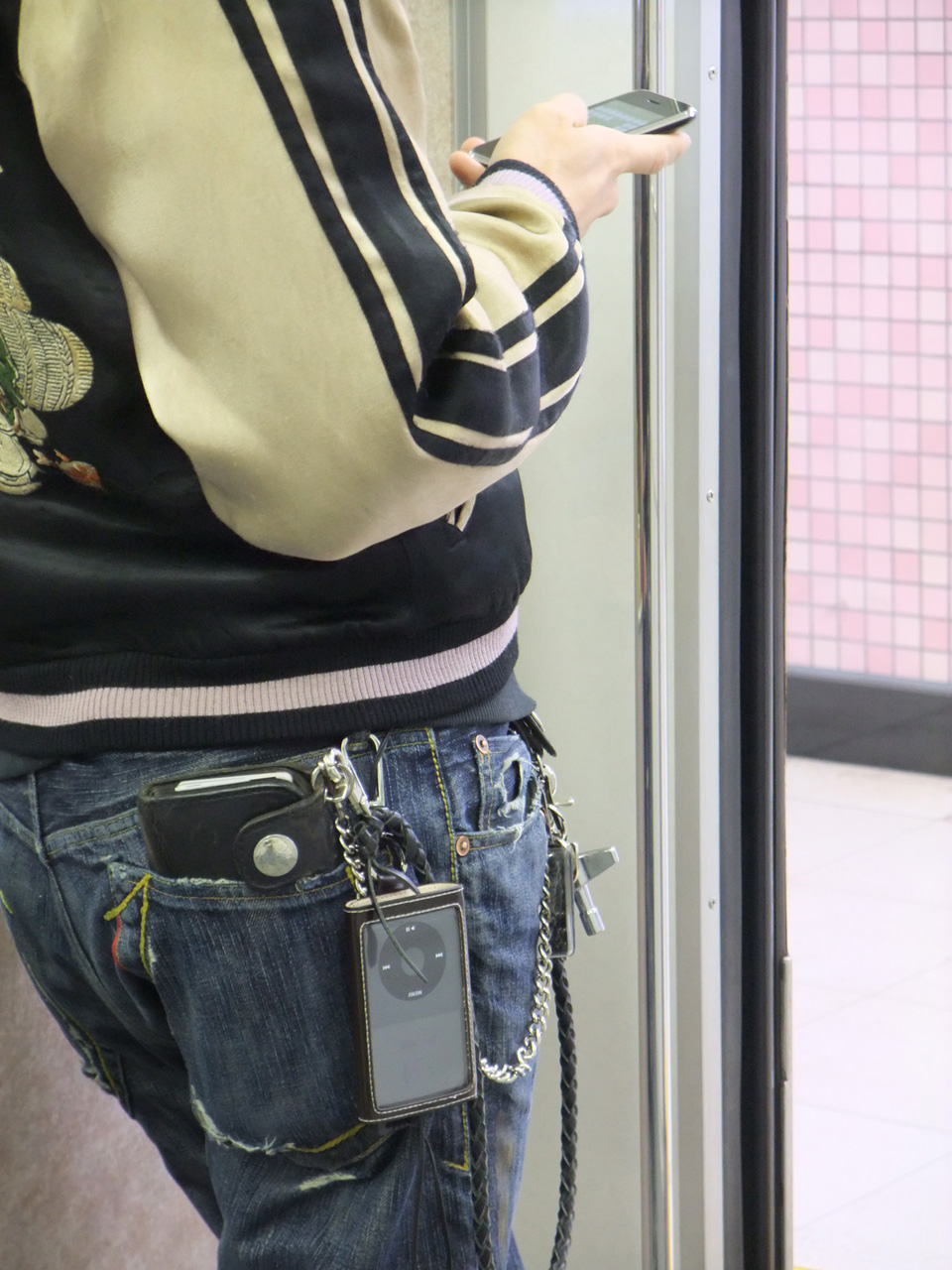
A person in Tokyo wearing a wallet chain

Wallet chains were originally worn by bikers to secure their wallets, with one end connected to the wallet and the other to the loop of one's belt. This prevents losing your wallet on the road while riding, as the vibrations can cause the rider's wallet to fall out of their pocket. They were a notable fashion trend in the 2000s, being primarily associated with bikers, streetwear, alternative subcultures such as punk and grunge, and skateboarders. Some chains may feature the logo of a motorcycle club that someone is associated with.

They can also be attached to keys, lighters, or cell phone cases, or used as an anti-theft measure.
