= List of experimental musicians =

This is a list of notable experimental musicians. The list is in alphabetical order by surname of the musicians - or the group thereof. As well as a tagline - of which is a short descriptor of the artists production & their contributions.

== A–E ==
- Mohamed Abdelwahab Abdelfattah – (Egypt) experimental music
- Acid Mothers Temple – experimental psychedelic rock
- Frédéric Acquaviva – (France) experimental music
- Giulio Aldinucci – experimental electroacoustic composer
- Miguel Álvarez-Fernández – experimental radio and sound installations
- Amnesia Scanner – Finnish experimental electronic duo
- Tori Amos – alternative, Baroque pop, experimental
- Anaiis – (French) (Senegal) experimental musician
- Laurie Anderson – electronic music
- Ron Anderson – noise and progressive
- Animal Collective – experimental music collective
- Aphex Twin – IDM, experimental, ambient, glitch
- Arca – (Venezuela) Experimental, Electronic music
- Autechre – (UK) IDM, Experimental, Ambient, Glitch, Flashcore
- Nigel Ayers – (UK) sound art, sound collage, member of Nocturnal Emissions
- Derek Bailey – guitarist
- Beck – (USA) anti-folk and experimental music
- David Behrman – live electronics
- Bipolar Explorer - experimental dreampop, spoken word, field recording
- Björk – alternative, avant-garde, experimental, electronica
- Bladee – cloud rap, experimental pop
- Boards of Canada – ambient, downtempo, IDM, electronica
- Boredoms – Japanese noise rock
- Burkhard Beins – percussion and objects
- Kate Bush – art pop/rock, experimental rock, alternative rock, Baroque pop
- Buckethead – guitarist
- Butthole Surfers – alternative rock, experimental, avant-Garde
- Glenn Branca – guitar, noise ensemble
- George Brecht – performance art
- Gavin Bryars – indeterministic orchestration
- Bull of Heaven – minimalism, noise, drone, avant-garde jazz, modern classical
- John Cage – indeterminate music
- Can – Krautrock band
- Captain Beefheart – avant-garde blues artist
- Cornelius Cardew – British composer
- Cardiacs – British rock band
- Charli XCX – experimental pop star
- Rhys Chatham – guitar, noise ensemble
- Cities Aviv – experimental hip-hop, post-genre
- Clipping. – experimental hip-hop
- Coil – sidereal sound, scrying, hallucinogens, ANS, glitches
- Nicolas Collins
- Loren Mazzacane Connors
- Controlled Bleeding – Paul Lemos
- David Cope – composer, computerist
- Henry Cowell – (USA) tone clusters and Extended technique
- Cui Jian – Alternative, avant-garde, experimental, electronica
- Alvin Curran – found sounds
- Current 93 – coined the term "apocalyptic folk"
- Chris Cutler – English experimental music composer and percussionist
- Dead Air Fresheners – masked, anonymous chance music or indeterminate music ensemble
- Death Grips – experimental hip-hop
- Deftones – experimental rock
- Stuart Dempster – reverberant spaces, just intonation, extended trombone techniques
- Earl Sweatshirt – experimental hip hop
- The Dillinger Escape Plan – experimental metal, mathcore
- Arnold Dreyblatt – just intonation
- Kevin Drumm – guitarist
- Iancu Dumitrescu – composer, founder of Hyperion group dedicated to experimental music
- Judy Dunaway
- Kyle Bobby Dunn – composer, arranger, experimental guitarist
- Trevor Dunn – bassist
- Eartheater – vocalist, producer
- Marc Edwards – free jazz
- Leif Elggren
- Brian Eno – ambient music, algorithmic composition
- Experimental Audio Research – ambient, synth/noise
- Carolina Eyck – thereminist

== F–J ==
- KÁRYYN
- Jean-Baptiste Favory – musique concrète & electronic
- Florian-Ayala Fauna – musician, music producer
- FKA Twigs – (UK) musician, songwriter, producer, director
- Morton Feldman – composer
- Flume – experimental electronic producer
- The Flying Lizards – (UK) experimental new wave group
- Flying Lotus – hip hop, IDM, jazz, electronica
- Henry Flynt – violinist, guitarist, inventor of Electronic Hillbilly Music
- David Fenech – musique concrète & experimental pop music
- David First – drones and interference beats
- John Frusciante – guitarist, rock musician, electronica, hip hop, avent-Garde
- Cor Fuhler – improvising multi instrumentalist, composer, instrument builder
- Ellen Fullman – long string Instrument
- Diamanda Galás – vocalist, composer
- Roopam Garg – guitarist, composer
- Qubais Reed Ghazala – musician, composer, father of circuit-bending
- Seppe Gebruers – Quartertone pianist, improvisor and composer
- Alice Glass – (Canada) Experimental, witch house, noise
- Philip Glass – minimalism, composer
- Percy Grainger – composer and performer
- Eli Gras
- Grimes – experimental electronica, synthpop
- Bruce Haack – experimental electronic composer
- Half Japanese – experimental indie rock
- Richard D. James – experimental, ambient, electronic music, techno
- The Hafler Trio
- Lou Harrison – (USA) gamelan influenced
- Carl Michael von Hausswolff
- Joseph Haydn – composer
- Pierre Henry – musique concrète
- Lejaren Hiller – first computer composition Illiac Suite (1957) with Leonard Issacson
- Susumu Hirasawa
- Christopher Hobbs – experimental and systems music composer
- Tim Hodgkinson – English experimental music composer and performer
- Gustav Holst – English composer
- Horse Lords – experimental math rock, krautrock
- Emily Howell – computer composer
- The Hub – interactive real-time computer network: John Bischoff, Tim Perkis, Chris Brown, Phil Stone, Scot Gresham-Lancaster, Mark Trayle
- I Set My Friends on Fire
- Martín Irigoyen – guitar, prepared guitar, multi-instrumentalist, steampunk, composer
- Rafael Anton Irisarri - ambient, experimental, modern classical
- Charles Ives – quarter tones, tone clusters, aleatoric music, polyrhythm and polytonality
- Don Joyce – sound collage
- iwrestledabearonce
- JPEGMAFIA – experimental hip-hop

== K–P ==
- KK Null – noise rock
- Kommissar Hjuler – cut-up collages
- Anne La Berge – flute, improvisation, electronics, composition
- Daniela Lalita – (Peru) vocalist and producer of experimental music
- André Éric Létourneau – gamelan, flute, composition, chance-operations, electronic music, microtonal music
- George E. Lewis – trombone, composition, improvisation, electronic music, computer music
- Steve Lieberman – American punk bassist, flutist called The Gangsta Rabbi
- A Life of Science – Arizona based electronic band
- Lightning Bolt – noise rock
- Lil Ugly Mane - Experimental Artist
- Franz Liszt – composer and performer
- Annea Lockwood – environmental sounds
- Alvin Lucier – (USA) acoustical phenomena
- John Lydon – (UK) singer
- Mama Baer – voice improvisation
- The Mars Volta – rock band
- Elio Martusciello – Italian experimental music composer and performer
- Melvins – experimental
- Meshuggah – extreme metal, experimental metal, progressive metal
- Miranda Sex Garden - British experimental music group
- Miya Masaoka – composer and performer
- Olivier Messiaen – (France) composer and organist
- Merzbow – (Japan) noise music
- Midori – (Japan) four-member jazz-punk fusion band
- Moondog – composer
- Gordon Mumma – live electronics
- Muslimgauze – (UK)
- Ben Neill – sound installations, mutantrumpet
- Phill Niblock – minimal music composer
- Nocturnal Emissions – (UK)
- Nurse With Wound – (UK and Ireland) collaborative solo project of artist Steven Stapleton
- Michael Nyman – (UK) composer and former critic and musicologist
- The Observatory – Singapore-based art-rock band
- Obsil – (ITA) composition, electronic music
- Pauline Oliveros – (USA) meditative music, just intonation, reverberant spaces, Expanded Instrument System
- Oneohtrix Point Never – (USA) electronic music, ambient music, vaporwave
- Yoko Ono – (UK, USA, Japan) happenings
- Orange Monkey – (USA)
- Orchestral Manoeuvres in the Dark – (UK) electronic music
- Ortiz Morales – (Spain) Experimental and noise music (old kinematic synchronisms reconstructions)
- John Oswald – (USA) plunderphonics
- Nam June Paik – happenings, action music
- Paul Panhuysen – string and other sound installations
- Evan Parker – (UK) saxophonist
- Harry Partch – (USA) microtonal composer
- Portishead – Bristol
- Henri Pousseur – (Belgium)

== Q–Z ==
- A.R. Rahman – (India) Film Music composer
- Steve Reich – (USA) multimedia documentary opera
- Hans Reichel – Free improvisation musician and inventor of electro-acoustic instruments
- Renaldo and the Loaf – (UK)
- Dino Residbegovic – (BiH) experimental/live-electronic contemporary music composer
- The Residents – (USA)
- Boyd Rice – (USA) noise music, ambient music
- Terry Riley – (USA) multimedia minimalist composer
- Ivette Román-Roberto – experimental vocalist
- Cipriano de Rore – (Franco-Flemish)
- David Rosenboom – biofeedback (human)
- Keith Rowe – British guitarist
- Luigi Russolo – Futurism and noise music
- Kristoffer Rygg – Frontman and main composer of Ulver
- Erik Satie – precursor of minimalism, dada
- Pierre Schaeffer – Musique concrète
- Mathias Rehfeldt – experimental organist, composer
- Giancarlo Schiaffini – Italian experimental music composer and performer
- Elliott Sharp – multi-instrumentalist
- Mark Stanley – guitarist, composer
- Solage – composer
- Sonic Youth – noise rock band
- SOPHIE - experimental pop
- Soul Coughing – improvisational jazz, hip hop, noise, and samples
- Sprain – experimental
- Howard Stelzer – (USA)
- Sunn O))) – drone metal band
- Svoy – (USA, Russia) Universal Music Group producer/writer/artist,
- Swans (band) – experimental rock, no wave
- Toru Takemitsu – composer
- James Tenney – alternate tunings, perceptual phenomena
- They Might Be Giants – alternative rock, indie rock, experimental rock, children's music
- Lynda Thomas – experimental musician and performer
- Throbbing Gristle – industrial music, noise, shock lyrics
- Edgard Varèse – electronic music
- Michael Waller – contemporary music
- Ween – psychedelic and lo-fi band that covers a multitude of genres
- Xiu Xiu – experimental rock, noise pop, spoken word
- Kathleen Yearwood – experimental, avant garde composer
- La Monte Young – just intonation, minimalist, drone music
- Richard Youngs – postmodern minimalist
- Frank Zappa – composer and performer
- Evan Ziporyn – (Bang on a Can), gamelan
- John Zorn – postmodern, various genres
- Zoviet France – British band

== See also ==
- List of musicians by genre
