= We Think as Instruments =

Studio album by I'm Not a Gun
- Released: 2 May 2006
- Genre: Post-rock, folktronica, electronica
- Length: 48:45
- Label: City Centre Offices
- Producer: John Tejada, Takeshi Nishimoto

I'm Not a Gun chronology
Our Lives on Wednesdays (2004)	We Think as Instruments (2006)	Mirror (2008)

Professional ratings
Review scores
Source	Rating
AllMusic	4/5 stars

We Think as Instruments is the third studio album by instrumental musical duo I'm Not a Gun. It shows the duo heading towards more guitar-oriented post-rock music.

== Track listing ==
1. "Soft Rain in the Spring" – 4:58
2. "Ripples in the Water" – 5:27
3. "Move" – 4:58
4. "Long Afternoon" – 5:43
5. "A Letter from the Past" – 4:09
6. "Rush Hour Traffic" – 2:47
7. "Unseen Moment" – 4:55
8. "Blue Garden" – 5:11
9. "As Far as Forever Goes" – 5:21
10. "Continuous Sky" – 5:16

== Personnel ==
- John Tejada – drums, bass, guitar (4, 9, 10), electronics
- Takeshi Nishimoto – guitar, bass, sarod
