= Our Lives on Wednesdays =

Studio album by I'm Not a Gun
- Released: December 13, 2004
- Genre: Post-rock, electronica
- Length: 53:56
- Label: City Centre Offices
- Producer: John Tejada, Takeshi Nishimoto

I'm Not a Gun chronology
Everything at Once (2003)	Our Lives on Wednesdays (2004)	We Think as Instruments (2006)

Professional ratings
Review scores
Source	Rating
Tiny Mix Tapes	3.5/5 stars
Brainwashed	(favorable)

Our Lives on Wednesdays is the second studio album from the instrumental musical duo I'm Not a Gun. The album's title is based on the circumstances in which the album was recorded. The performers, John Tejada and Takeshi Nishimoto, met on Wednesdays over a five-year period to play music, and the album is the outcome of the sessions.

== Track listing ==
1. "Walk Through Walls" – 4:44
2. "Every Moment Is Ours" – 5:15
3. "Slowly Discovering" – 5:13
4. "Off in the Distance" – 4:50
5. "Words Speak and Choose" – 4:55
6. "Champion" – 5:00
7. "Sundays Will Never Change" – 5:04
8. "Scenes of Someone Else" – 5:21
9. "Never Meant to Be" – 4:28
10. "Stable Soundwaves" – 4:38

== Personnel ==
- John Tejada – electronics, programming, drums, guitar, bass
- Takeshi Nishimoto – guitar, bass
