= Minima Moralia (disambiguation) =

Minima Moralia is a critical theory book by Theodor W. Adorno.

Minima Moralia may also refer to:

- Minima moralia, an ethics book by Andrei Pleşu
- Minima Moralia, an album by Chihei Hatakeyama
