= Tides (Arovane album) =

Studio album by Arovane
- Released: 1 June 2000
- Recorded: 1999
- Genre: IDM; ambient; downtempo
- Length: 39:51
- Label: City Centre Offices
- Producer: Uwe Zahn

Arovane chronology
Atol Scrap (2000)	Tides (2000)	AER (Valid) (2001)

Tides is the second studio album by German electronic music producer Arovane, released on 1 June 2000 by City Centre Offices.

== Critical reception ==
Professional ratings
Review scores
Source	Rating
AllMusic	4.5/5 stars
Muzik	5/5
NME	8/10
Pitchfork	8.8/10

Resident Advisor placed Tides at number 99 on its list of the 100 best albums of the 2000s; in an accompanying write-up, critic Todd Burns dubbed the album "a small masterpiece of ambient music that seemed to have nary a Max/MSP patch in sight." In 2017, Tides was ranked at number 44 on Pitchfork's list of the 50 best IDM albums of all time.

== Track listing ==
All tracks are written by Uwe Zahn.

No.	Title	Length
1.	"Theme"	3:40
2.	"Tides"	5:32
3.	"Eleventh!"	4:45
4.	"Tomorrow Morning"	1:51
5.	"Seaside"	3:35
6.	"A Secret"	4:39
7.	"The Storm"	7:23
8.	"Deauville"	5:43
9.	"Epilogue"	2:43
Total length:		39:51

== Personnel ==
Credits are adapted from the album's liner notes.

- Uwe Zahn – production
- Bettina Hovgaard-Petersen – cover artwork
- Christian Kleine – guitar
- Oliver Schulze – cover artwork
