= Giving Up the Ghost (disambiguation) =

"Giving Up the Ghost" is an episode of the television series Ugly Betty.

Giving Up the Ghost may also refer to:

== Music ==
=== Albums ===
- Giving Up the Ghost, by Gene Loves Jezebel, 2001
- Giving Up the Ghost, by Jackie Greene, 2008
- Giving Up the Ghost, by SubtractiveLAD, 2005
- Giving Up the Ghost, by Robert Walter, 2003
- Giving Up the Ghost, by Windsor for the Derby, 2005
- Giving Up the Ghost, an EP by Alex Vargas, 2015

=== Songs ===
- "Giving Up the Ghost", by a-ha from Cast in Steel, 2015
- "Giving Up the Ghost", by the Bee Gees from E.S.P., 1987
- "Giving Up the Ghost", by Birds of Prey from The Hellpreacher, 2009
- "Giving Up the Ghost", by Blossoms from Cool Like You, 2018
- "Giving Up the Ghost", by BT from Movement in Still Life, 1999
- "Giving Up the Ghost", by Marc Cohn from Join the Parade, 2007
- "Giving Up the Ghost", by GZR from Plastic Planet, 1995
- "Giving Up the Ghost", by Kerli from Shadow Works, 2019
- "Giving Up the Ghost", by DJ Shadow from The Private Press, 2002
- "Giving Up the Ghost", by T'Pau from Red, 1998
- "Giving Up the Ghost (That's Haunting Me)", by Lee Greenwood from Holdin' a Good Hand, 1990

== Other media ==
- Giving Up the Ghost, a 2003 memoir by Hilary Mantel
- Giving Up the Ghost, a 1986 play by Cherríe Moraga
- Giving Up the Ghost, a 2008 radio play by Lynne Truss
- Giving Up the Ghost, a 1998 television film directed by Claudia Weill
- "Giving Up the Ghost", an episode of Ghost Whisperer

== See also ==
- Give Up the Ghost (disambiguation)
