= Lilies (Arovane album) =

Studio album by Arovane
- Released: 14 June 2004
- Genre: Electronica, IDM
- Label: City Centre Offices
- Producer: Uwe Zahn

Lilies was the last album prior to a nine-year hiatus for Arovane, ending in 2013 with the release of Ve Palor.

It is rated 3.5 out of 5 stars on AllMusic.

== Track listing ==
1. "Ten Hours" (3:01)
2. "Windy Wish Trees" (3:19)
3. "Passage to Nagoya" (2:07)
4. "Cry Osaka Cry" (5:08)
5. "Pink Lilies" (4:00)
6. "Lilies" (5:27)
7. "Tokyo Ghost Stories" (5:07)
8. "Instant Gods Out of the Box" (4:35)
9. "Good Bye Forever" (3:48)
