= N5MD =

American record label

n5MD
- Founded: 2000
- Founder: Mike Cadoo
- Distributors: Redeye (Global, ex. UK); SRD (UK / EU); P*Dis / Inpartmaint (JP) n5B2B (Iceland)
- Genre: Electroacoustic; post-rock; post-classical; experimental; ambient; electronica
- Country of origin: United States
- Location: Oakland, California
- Official website: n5md.com

n5MD is an American record label based in Oakland, California. The label was founded by Mike Cadoo in 2000.

n5MD started out as a MiniDisc-only label, the label name meaning "No Fives, Minidiscs!" But when Sony DADC Austria stopped manufacturing pre-recorded MDs, n5MD changed over to CDs, continuing to release a few 7" records and eventually moving to 12". Much of the back catalog is available for purchase in MP3 format from the label's web site.

The label specializes in more emotive styles of contemporary music, with their releases branching between post-rock, post-classical, experimental music and electronica. The label has released over 100 albums to date.

n5MD signed with Redeye Worldwide in October 2017 for North American physical and worldwide digital distribution.

== Active roster ==
- (Ghost)
- Aerosol
- Arovane
- Asonat
- Axel Rigaud
- Boy Is Fiction + Ghosts Of Tyto Alba
- Bvdub
- Dalot
- Daniel McCagh
- Dreissk
- Ex Confusion
- Fall Therapy
- Hollie Kenniff
- ILUITEQ
- Jason van Wyk
- Last Days
- Loess
- Mark Harris
- Miwon
- Near The Parenthesis
- Ocoeur
- Okada
- Porya Hatami And Arovane
- Preghost
- Ruxpin
- Stray Theories
- Suumhow
- Tangent
- To Destroy A City
- Winterlight

== Alumni ==
- Another Electronic Musician
- Arc Lab
- Bavaria
- Bitcrush
- Crisopa
- Dag Rosenqvist
- Damiak
- Diamat
- Dryft
- Eleventhfloorrecords
- Elise Melinand
- Ent
- Funckarma
- Ghost Bike
- Hologram
- Jvox
- Keef Baker
- Lights Out Asia
- Ml
- Plastik Joy
- Port-Royal
- Portland
- Proem
- Run_Return
- Spark
- SubtractiveLAD
- Tim Koch
- Tobias Lilja
- Vcam
- Vesna

== See also ==
- List of record labels
- List of independent record labels
- List of electronic music record labels
