= Sonic Subjunkies =

Sonic Subjunkies (sometimes abbreviated as SSJ) was a German Digital Hardcore band based in Berlin, best known for releasing records on Digital Hardcore Recordings.

== History ==
Formed in the autumn of 1992, The band consisted of vocalist Holger Phrack, programmer Rob Marvin and producer/programmer Thaddeus Herrmann. The trio would later go on to release two limited edition albums and a handful of singles on Digital Hardcore, before defecting to the label Iris Light in 1998 for the release of their album Molotov Lounge.

In later years Thaddi also contributed to other projects such as Herrmann & Kleine, but was also DJ for radio KISS FM Berlin and went on to be editor of the German music magazine de:bug. No new SSJ material has surfaced since 1998, but a re-released vinyl version of Molotov Lounge was bought out on Lux Nigra in 2004.

=== Discography ===
- Suburban Soundtracks Pt.1 (12", EP) Digital Hardcore Recordings (DHR) 1994
- Sounds From The City Of Quartz (Cass) Midi War 1995
- Turntable Terrorist E.P. (12", EP) Digital Hardcore Recordings (DHR) 1995
- Live At The Suicide Club 8 - 7 - 95 (CD) Digital Hardcore Recordings (DHR) 1998
- Molotov Lounge (CD) Iris Light Records 1999, re-released on Lux Nigra in 2004
- With A Little Love / Sonic Junior (7", Pur) Irritant 2000
