= Thaddeus Herrmann =

German musician and journalist

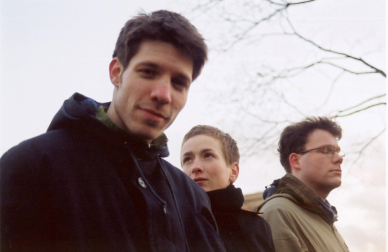
Herrmann & Kleine, with Herrmann right (ca. 2002)

Thaddeus "Thaddi" Herrmann (born 1972) is a German electronic musician, label owner as well as music and technology journalist.

== Life and career ==
In 1992 Herrmann, Holger Phrack and Rob Marvin founded the band Sonic Subjunkies, that released some full-length recordings on Alec Empires label Digital Hardcore Recordings (DHR). Their first EP Suburban Soundtracks Volume 1 was released in 1994 on DHR. The Sonic Subjunkies were featured in the online tribute from BBC's Radio 1 to John Peel. During these years Herrmann and Bassdee were also working as radio DJs at 98.8 KISS FM Berlin where they hosted the drum and bass show Radio Massive.

Together with the Manchester-based Shlom Sviri Herrmann founded the label City Centre Offices (CCO) in 1998, that has released recordings from various acts, including Casino Versus Japan, I'm Not A Gun, and Ulrich Schnauss. Since 2000 Herrmann also runs the small Berlin-based house label Just Another Beat.

In 1997 Herrmann met Christian Kleine during one of his radio shows and both founded Herrmann & Kleine in 1999. A few years later, in 2003 Herrmann, Hans Möller and Michael Zorn founded the project Boy Robot, with the debut album Glamorizing Corporate Lifestyle released at CCO. Together with Zorn he also released under the moniker No Movement No Sound No Memories.

Herrmann is the editor for De:Bug, a German magazine that focuses on electronic music and technology. He also blogs for the German edition of technology blog Engadget. He hosts the show Nightflight at Radio Fritz.

== Discography ==
Albums

- 1995: Sonic Subjunkies – Sounds From The City Of Quartz (Midi War)
- 1998: Sonic Subjunkies – Molotov Lounge (Lux Nigra)
- 2002: Herrmann & Kleine – Our Noise (Morr Music)
- 2003: Boy Robot – Glamorizing Corporate Lifestyle (City Centre Offices)
- 2005: Boy Robot – Rotten Cocktails (City Centre Offices)
- 2006: No Movement No Sound No Memories – Removed / Acetate (Lux Nigra)

Singles & EPs

- 1994: Sonic Subjunkies – Suburban Soundtracks Pt.1 (Digital Hardcore Recordings)
- 1995: Sonic Subjunkies – Turntable Terrorist E.P. (Digital Hardcore Recordings)
- 1998: Sonic Subjunkies – Live At The Suicide Club 8-7-95 (Digital Hardcore Recordings)
- 1999: No Movement No Sound No Memories – Removed (Lux Nigra)
- 2000: Sonic Subjunkies – With A Little Love / Sonic Junior (Irritant Records)
- 1999: Herrmann & Kleine – Transalpin EP (City Centre Offices)
- 2000: Herrmann & Kleine – Kickboard Girl EP (Morr Music)
- 2003: Boy Robot – Set It For Me (City Centre Offices)
- 2004: Herrmann Karaoke – Untitled (Inzest Records)
- 2006: No Movement No Sound No Memories – Acetate (Lux Nigra)
