= Christian Kleine =

German musician (born 1974)

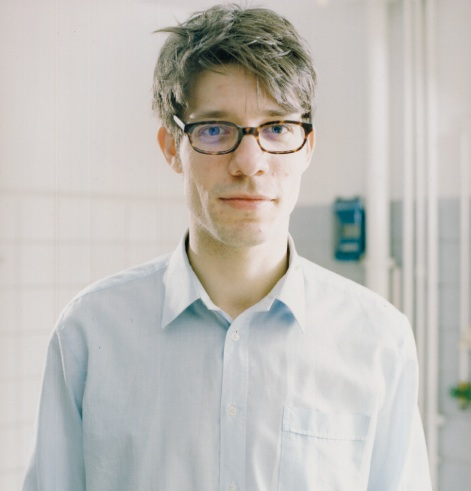
- Pictured in 2011

Background information
- Born: 8 December 1974 (age 50); Lindau, Germany
- Genres: Electronica, intelligent dance music
- Years active: Early 1990s–present
- Labels: City Centre Offices, Morr Music
- Website: www.christiankleine.com

Christian Kleine (born 8 December 1974, in Lindau) is a German musician.

== Career ==
Kleine grew up at the Bodensee and with 10 years age started to study classical trumpet. He later learned to play electric bass, drums and guitar. Influenced by new wave music, post-punk and later by electronic music, Kleine started with DJing at the age of 17.

In 1995 Kleine moved to Berlin, where he produced his own electronic music. In 1997 he met radio DJ Thaddeus Herrmann and both founded the project Herrmann & Kleine. The duo released the album Our Noise in 2002 as well as two EPs.

Kleine's solo debut album Beyond Repair was released in 2001 on the City Centre Offices label. The Valis EP followed in 2002 on Morr Music. He later collaborated with Arovane for a split EP and co-produced Arovane's second album Tides.

His second full-length solo album, Real Ghosts, was released in 2004, back on City Centre Offices.

== Discography ==
=== Albums ===
- 2001: Beyond Repair (City Centre Offices)
- 2004: Real Ghosts (City Centre Offices)
- 2010: Illusion (Self release at boomkat.com)
- 2013: Shipbuilding (Self release at Bandcamp)
- 2016: Coreal (Self release at Bandcamp)
- 2017: Stokes (Self release at Bandcamp)
- 2018: Electronic Music From The Lost World 1998-2001 (a strangely isolated place)
- 2019: Strange Holiday Pt1 & 2 (Self release at Bandcamp)
- 2020: Touch & Fuse (a strangely isolated place)

=== EPs ===
- 2000: Minus Time / Quadriga (City Centre Offices)
- 2002: Valis (Morr Music)
- 2002: Firn EP (City Centre Offices)
- 2022: Island ep1 & Island ep2 (Self release at Bandcamp)

=== Split Releases ===
- 2000: Yeer / Disper with Arovane (Awkward Silence)
