= Give Up the Ghost =

Give Up the Ghost may refer to:

- Give Up the Ghost (band), now American Nightmare, a hardcore punk band
- Give Up the Ghost (album), by Brandi Carlile, 2009
- "Give Up the Ghost", a song by Ariana and the Rose
- "Give Up the Ghost", a song by C2C from Tetra
- "Give Up the Ghost", a song by Immature from The Journey
- "Give Up the Ghost", a song by Radiohead from The King of Limbs
- "Give Up the Ghost", a song by Starsailor from Good Souls: The Greatest Hits
- "Give Up the Ghost", a song by Switches from Heart Tuned to D.E.A.D.
- Give Up the Ghost, a 2019 Jordanian short film directed by Zain Duraie

== See also ==
- Giving Up the Ghost (disambiguation)
