= Signs Under Test =

2015 studio album by John Tejada

Studio album by John Tejada
- Released: February 2, 2016
- Genres: Techno, Tech House
- Length: 58:09
- Label: Kompakt

John Tejada chronology
The Predicting Machine (2012)	Signs Under Test (2016)	Dead Start Program (2018)

Professional ratings
Aggregate scores
Source	Rating
Metacritic	79/100
Review scores
Source	Rating
Exclaim!	8/10
Pitchfork Media	7.4/10
PopMatters	8/10 stars
Resident Advisor	4.1/5 stars
musicOMH	4/5 stars

Signs Under Test is the tenth full-length release for the California-based techno DJ/producer John Tejada. It was released on February 2, 2015 on Kompakt.

== Track listing ==
No.	Title	Length
1.	"Two 0 One"	5:43
2.	"Y 0 Why"	4:34
3.	"Beacht"	5:11
4.	"R.U.R."	5:33
5.	"Vaalbara"	5:30
6.	"Cryptochrome"	5:41
7.	"Rubric"	5:13
8.	"Penumbra"	5:22
9.	"Endorphins"	5:22
10.	"Meadow"	5:10
11.	"Heave In Sight"	4:44
