= Daydreams in Cold Weather =

Studio album by John Tejada
- Released: 2002
- Genre: Electronica, House/Techno
- Length: 59:57
- Producer: John Tejada

John Tejada chronology
Daydreams in Cold Weather (2002)	The Toiling Of Idle Hands (2003)

'Daydreams in Cold Weather' (2002) is an album by DJ John Tejada.

AllMusic described the album as a "highly rewarding album overall."

== Track listing ==
All tracks by John Tejada

Daydreams in Cold Weather track listing
No.	Title	Length
1.	"To the West"	4:51
2.	"Stop the Mechanism"	4:31
3.	"Create Fixate"	4:42
4.	"Shifted"	5:13
5.	"Young"	5:54
6.	"Summer Rain"	5:18
7.	"Count the Seconds"	4:54
8.	"Rehearsing Disaster"	4:59
9.	"Abre Los Ojos"	4:03
10.	"The Silence of Us" (featuring Divine Styler)	5:24
11.	"In Coach"	5:06
12.	"Some Would Know Why"	5:02

== Personnel ==
- Divine Styler – Vocals
- Shawn King – Design
- Carmen Tejada – Vocals
- John Tejada – Producer
