= Nickolas Mohanna =

American artist and composer

- performing in Berlin, Germany 2023

Background information
- Genres: Experimental; free improvisation; ambient; noise
- Instruments: Guitar, Computer, etc.
- Years active: 2003–present
- Labels: Karlrecords, Longform Editions/Preservation, Aagoo Records, AKP Recordings, Run/Off
- Website: nickolasmohanna.com

Nickolas Mohanna is an American artist, composer, and guitarist. His interdisciplinary practice employs a variety of media to explore and blur the borders between music, sound art, video and drawing.

== Biography ==
Born 1979, he moved to the Bay Area to study printmaking at San Francisco State University and later went to the University of California, Davis for an MFA in Art Studio. While there he took courses with Mike Henderson, Bob Ostertag, Annabeth Rosen, Douglas Kahn, and Wayne Thiebaud. He lives and works in New York.

== Work ==
In his sound compositions, there is a "tendency of sculpting and orchestrating a minimal array of sounds into sonically rich and spacious atmospheres." Some pieces explore field recordings processed into abstract soundscapes with electroacoustic procedures. "While other arrangements invoke a post-punk minimalism with flashes of Arthur Russell." Most of the sounds are sourced from local environments. While certain tracks "bury melodies in multiple layers of distortion to reveal their latent chromatic richness through gradually mutating textural contrast." The "consistent tone makes it all flow together like raindrops forming a lake." The music critic Byron Coley, writes he "rides on psychedelic clouds of freedom." In a Village Voice interview, he remarks that his aim is to create an "immersive stereo space where the sound would be reduced to its rawest form." In addition to these works, he has also published a number of artists' books which have served as visual accompaniments, conceptual ideas, or graphic scores to his sonic practice on the imprint Run/Off; which he founded in 2014. Run/Off Editions has since published artists’ books by Marina Rosenfeld, Robin Watkins & Nina Canell, Milano Chow and others; focusing on the book form as a collaborative process.

== Selected Discography ==
- Hunting Horns (Abandon Ship Records, 2008)
- In Embers (Stunned Records, 2009)
- The Relative Middle (Small Doses, 2009)
- Birth To A Point (Blackest Rainbow, 2009)
- Optics (Slow Flow Rec, 2010)
- Transmission Hue (Low Point, 2010)
- Reflectors (Preservation, 2011)
- Parallax View (Low Point, 2013)
- Control Group (Metaphysical Circuits, 2013)
- Phase Line (Run/Off Editions & WFMU Free Music Archive 2015)
- Mantis (Preservation, 2016)
- Chroma (Karlrecords, 2017)
- Smoke (Aagoo Records, 2019)
- Throwing The Chain (Longform Editions, 2019)
- Automatic (with Matt Schulz) bs,bta, 2021)
- Nerve Plexus (Dadaist Tapes, 2021)
- Sight Drawings (Run/Off, 2022)
- Double Pendulum (Run/Off, 2023)
- LIVE (with Jef Mertens, 291, 2024)
- Speaker Rotations (AKP Recordings, 2025)

== Publications / Multiples ==
- Theater. France: Kaugummi, 2010.
- Particles Brooklyn, New York: Medium Rare, 2010.
- Apparatus France: Lendroit éditions, 2011. Offset poster publication. Edition of 1000.
- Interface France: Lendroit éditions, 2011. ISBN 978-2-917427-11-8.
- Floodlights Brooklyn, New York: Oso Press, 2012.
- Boundaries Los Angeles, CA: The Ice Plant, 2012. Edition of 100.
- LAND New York, New York: Run/Off Editions, 2015. ISBN 978-1-63415-661-5.
- Heat Death France: Lendroit éditions, 2017. ISBN 978-2-37751-005-4.
- Spin Group New York, New York: Run/Off Editions, 2021. ISBN 978-1-64871-848-9.
- Broken Chords New York, New York: Run/Off Editions, 2023. ISBN 979-8-88992-023-6
- Hydraulics New York, New York: Run/Off Editions, 2025. ISBN 979-8-90030-253-9

== Film / Video ==
His video and film work have been used in both gallery installations and for live sound performances; using a range of computer animation, found video, or appropriated footage. Many of them have mirrored various sound compositions by using collage or distortion to explore electronic & acoustic processes.

- Ruins, video projection, 16mm film transferred to video, 3:50 min, black/white, sound, 2008
- Ceremony, video, 5:20 min, color, sound, 2010
- Elements, 16mm film transferred to video 3:50 min, color, sound, 2011
- Generator, video projection, 2:00 min, black/white, sound, 2013
- Passage, video projection, 4:56 min, black/white, sound, 2015
- Quadrant, video projection, 2:00 min, color, sound, 2017
- Subsystem, video projection, animation, 6:17 min, black/white, sound, 2018
- Beam & Column, video projection, 2:00 min, color, sound, 2019

== Collections ==
His artists' books have been archived at the Franklin Furnace Archive, Whitney Museum of American Art, National Gallery of Art, Getty Research Institute, Tate Modern, Brooklyn Museum, Museum of Modern Art New York, Los Angeles County Museum, Cleveland Museum of Art, New York Public Library (Spencer Collection), Walker Art Center, Museum Ludwig (Cologne), and the Stedelijk Museum.
