= Mercedes Bunz =

German art historian and journalist

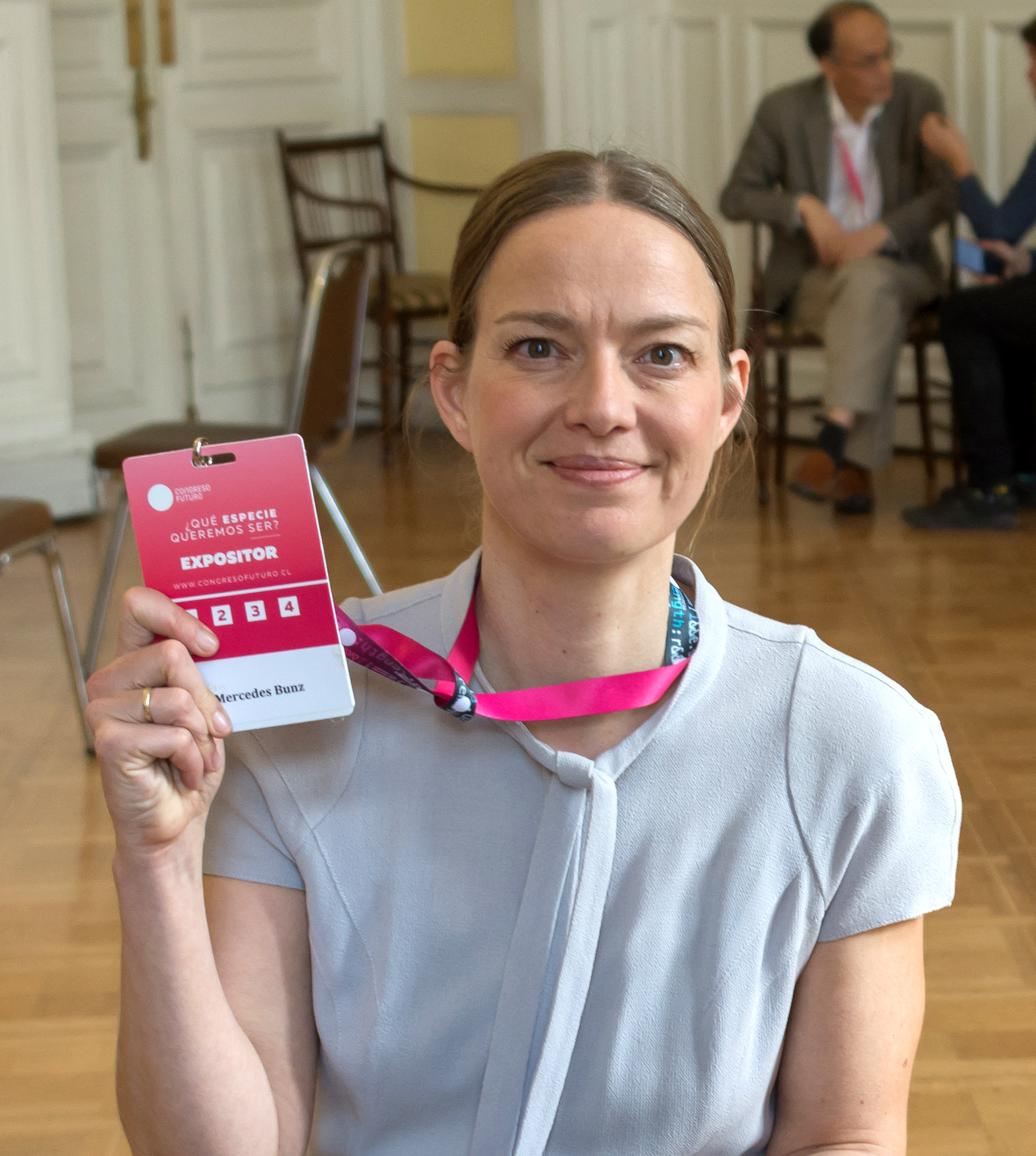
- Bunz in 2019
- Born: 16 November 1971 (age 55); Magdeburg, Saxony-Anhalt, Germany
- Occupations: Philosopher, journalist, art historian
- Known for: Founder of De:Bug

Mercedes Bunz (born 16 November 1971) is a German art historian, journalist, and the Professor of Digital Culture and Society at King's College London.

== Biography ==
=== Early career ===
Bunz studied philosophy and art history at the Freie Universität Berlin, after passing her final exams at the Celtis-Gymnasium secondary school in the German town of Schweinfurt in 1991. Together with Sascha Kösch, Riley Reinhold, and Benjamin Weiss she founded the Berlin music monthly De:Bug in 1997, becoming its co-editor and editor-in-chief from 1999 until 2001.

She was awarded a scholarship by Heinrich-Böll-Stiftung, enabling her to graduate at Bauhaus-Universität Weimar writing about the history of the internet between the 1950s and the 1980s. Her dissertation thesis was published as a non-fiction book in 2008. This was also used by Melih Bilgil in his 2009 animation History of the Internet.

=== Work ===
Mercedes Bunz's work has been both academic and journalistic. Having worked as a freelance journalist for a period, Bunz became a lecturer at Bielefeld University. In that same year she also began working for Berlin city magazine zitty before running the on-line business of the German daily Tagesspiegel. In 2009, she joined the London newspaper The Guardian as a media and technology reporter. She stayed with The Guardian until the beginning of 2011, where she followed events in on-line journalism and social networking websites.

In 2010 Bunz was awarded the Fachjournalisten-Preis by the German association of specialist editors, or Deutscher Fachjournalisten-Verband. In 2011 she held the Impakt Fellowship of the Centre for the Humanities from the Utrecht University. She has written for the German internet magazines Telepolis and Carta.

Her book on the impact of algorithms on society was published by Suhrkamp in 2012. An updated version of Mercedes Bunz: The Silent Revolution: How Digitalization Transforms Knowledge, Work, Journalism and Politics without Making Too Much Noise came out with Palgrave Macmillan in 2014. The Spanish version "La Revolución Silenciosa" has been translated by Cruce and came out in 2017.

She has been a member of the Interdisciplinary Network for the Critical Humanities Terra Critica and is a co-founder of meson press, an open access press that publishes research on digital cultures, technology and networked media, one outcome of the Hybrid Publishing Lab, Leuphana University, which she directed from 2012-2014.

She became Senior Lecturer at the University of Westminster, London in 2014. In 2018, her book written together with Graham Meikle on the internet of things came out with Polity, in which they explore questions regarding networked sensors and Artificial Intelligence as things become media.

On 31 October 2017 Mercedes Bunz gave evidence to the House of Lords Select Committee for Artificial Intelligence and presented her Artificial Intelligence research on the importance of publicly available datasets given the rise of machine learning that has been taken up in the report. In September 2018 she started working at the Department of Digital Humanities, King's College London., where she is Professor of Digital Culture and Society since 2022. In 2019 her co-written book on digital communication and machine communication was co-published (open access) by University of Minnesota Press and meson press.

== Writings ==
- Mercedes Bunz: Vom Speicher zum Verteiler – Die Geschichte des Internet. Kulturverlag Kadmos, Berlin 2008, ISBN 978-3-86599-025-9.
- Bunz, Mercedes. "Logik der Technik: Das Denken und die Digitalisierung". FAZ.NET (in German). ISSN 0174-4909.
- Mercedes Bunz: Die stille Revolution – Wie Algorithmen Wissen, Arbeit, Öffentlichkeit und Politik verändern, ohne dabei viel Lärm zu machen. Suhrkamp Verlag, edition unseld 43, Berlin 2012, ISBN 978-3518260432.
  - Mercedes Bunz: The Silent Revolution: How Digitalization Transforms Knowledge, Work, Journalism and Politics without Making Too Much Noise. Palgrave Macmillan, London 2014, ISBN 978-1-137-37350-2.
- Mercedes Bunz: La revolución silenciosa. Cómo los algoritmos transforman el conocimiento, el trabajo, la opinión pública y la política sin hacer mucho ruido. Cruce Casa Editora, Buenos Aires 2017, ISBN 978-987-45637-7-4.
- Mercedes Bunz and Graham Meikle: The Internet of Things. Polity Press, London 2018, ISBN 978-1509517466.
- Paula Bialski, Finn Brunton and Mercedes Bunz: Communication. University of Minnesota Press & meson press, Minneapolis 2019, ISBN 978-1517906474.
