= The Toiling of Idle Hands =

The Toiling Of Idle Hands

Studio album by John Tejada
- Released: 4 November 2003
- Genre: Electronica, House/Techno
- Length: 46:51
- Label: Immigrant
- Producer: John Tejada

John Tejada chronology
Daydreams In Cold Weather (2002)	The Toiling Of Idle Hands (2003)	Logic Memory Center (2004)

The Toiling of Idle Hands, is the 2003 moniker-free, solo release from John Tejada.

== Track listing ==
1. "Sound Of Possibility" – 5:25
2. "Tethered" – 5:05
3. "Beautiful Confusion" – 5:04
4. "Dividing Each Existence" – 4:59
5. "The Pavement View" – 4:55
6. "Mating Rhythm" – 5:11
7. "Mental Jukebox" – 5:12
8. "Electric Whipcrack" – 5:11
9. "Thoughts In Chains" – 5:12
10. "A Fading Memory" – 5:23

== Reception ==
Professional ratings
Review scores
Source	Rating
Allmusic	link
