= Karlrecords =

German record label

- Founded: 2006
- Founder: Thomas Herbst
- Genre: Contemporary music, Ambient, Post-classical, Electroacoustic
- Country of origin: Germany
- Location: Berlin
- Official website: www.karlrecords.net

Karlrecords is a Berlin-based record label founded in 2006 by Thomas Herbst. The label focuses on many different approaches to experimental and electroacoustic music. Alongside publishing new music, the Karlrecords also reissued various works, like Silver Apples of the Moon by Morton Subotnick and published a new edition of Iannis Xenakis Persepolis, that later was included in the Iannis Xenakis - Electroacoustic Works anthology.

== Artists ==
The following are artists with releases on Karlrecords:

- 75 Dollar Bill
- dieANGEL (Ilpo Väisänen and Dirk Dresselhaus)
- Arovane
- Audrey Chen
- Bérangère Maximin
- Bill Laswell
- Fret
- Gareth Davis
- Giulio Aldinucci
- Hanno Leichtmann
- Hans Castrup
- Iannis Xenakis
- Kammerflimmer Kollektief
- Karkhana
- Keiji Haino
- Konstrukt
- Laurent De Schepper Trio
- Martina Bertoni
- Morton Subotnick
- Nickolas Mohanna
- Peter Rehberg
- Porya Hatami
- Reinhold Friedl
- Thurston Moore
- Yoko Ono
- Zeitkratzer
