= Boy Robot =

German electronica duo

- Origin: Berlin, Germany
- Genres: Electronica, Chillout
- Years active: 2003–present
- Labels: City Centre Offices
- Members: Michael Zorn; Hans Möller

Boy Robot is an electronica duo from Berlin, Germany.

Michael Zorn and Hans Möller met in Berlin, both working for Ableton, one coding one marketing the new hope of musicians. Both had been making music before, both were looking for a new direction.

== Discography ==
=== Albums ===
- Glamorizing Corporate Lifestyle (2003)
- Rotten Cocktails (2005)
