= Herrmann & Kleine =

Electronic pop duo

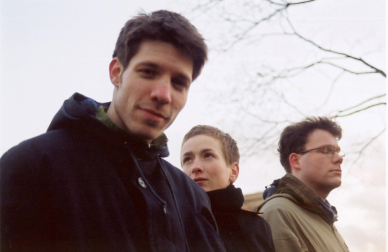
Herrmann (right) & Kleine (left)

Herrmann & Kleine was an electronic pop ("plinkerpop") duo that formed circa 1997 and featured DJ Christian Kleine and City Centre Offices label manager Thaddeus Herrmann.

Their sole full-length recording Our Noise saw release on 2 April 2002 via the Morr Music label.

In addition to releasing a pair of EP recordings, the duo also provided remixes to tracks by various notable bands, including His Name Is Alive and Bomb the Bass. They also shared stages with the likes of Lali Puna. It was disbanded in 2005.

== Our Noise ==
Professional ratings
Review scores
Source	Rating
Allmusic	link

Our Noise was released in 2002 on Morr Music.

=== Track listing ===
1. "Drop"
2. "Her Tune"
3. "Kissing You at 120 BPM"
4. "Still Tired"
5. "Shuttle"
6. "Blue Flower"
7. "Headlights"
8. "Wonder"
9. "Catch a Snowflake"
10. "Don't Look Back"

== Discography ==
=== Albums ===
- Our Noise (2002)

=== Singles & EPs ===
- Transalpin (1999)
- Kickboard Girl (2000)
