= I'm Not a Gun =

American post-rock/electronica music duo

- Origin: Los Angeles, California, US
- Genres: Post-rock, instrumental rock, electronica, folktronica
- Years active: 2000–present
- Labels: City Centre Offices, Palette
- Members: John Tejada; Takeshi Nishimoto
- Website: myspace.com/imnotagunofficial

I'm Not a Gun is an American post-rock and electronica musical duo by John Tejada and Takeshi Nishimoto, formed in 2000.

== Background ==
Tejada and Nishimoto met in 1998 and discovered that they took inspiration from the same musicians. Shortly afterward, they held several recording sessions and eventually released multiple albums on the City Centre Offices imprint.

Their music has been remixed by several artists, including Dntel, Ulrich Schnauss, and Polar. The duo's music has been compared to that of the Chicago-based post-rock group, Tortoise.

Their name comes from the animated feature film The Iron Giant.

== Discography ==
=== Albums ===
- Everything at Once (2003, City Centre Offices)
- Our Lives on Wednesdays (2004, City Centre Offices)
- We Think as Instruments (2006, City Centre Offices)
- Mirror (2008, Palette Recordings)
- Solace (2010, City Centre Offices)

=== EPs ===
- Make Sense and Loose Remixes (2003, City Centre Offices)
- Sundays Will Never Change Remixes (2005, City Centre Offices)
