= Jason van Wyk =

- Born: January 10, 1990 (age 36); Cape Town, South Africa
- Genres: Ambient; electronic; contemporary classical
- Occupations: Composer, music producer
- Years active: 2000s–present
- Labels: n5MD, Home Normal, Black Hole Recordings
- Website: jasonvanwyk.com

Jason van Wyk (born 10 January 1990) is a South African composer and music producer based in Cape Town. His work spans ambient, electronic, experimental and contemporary classical music.

== Career ==
Van Wyk began releasing electronic music in the mid-2000s, primarily through Black Hole Recordings, producing singles and remixes in the progressive trance genre.

Beginning with Days You Remember (2013), his work increasingly incorporated ambient and piano-based composition. Subsequent releases, including Attachment (2016) and Opacity (2017), released by the UK label Home Normal, further developed this direction.

In 2021, van Wyk released Threads through the American independent label n5MD. Threads was followed by albums Descendants (2022), Inherent (2025), and the EP Horizon (2025).

In addition to his solo work, van Wyk has composed music for film, documentary and commercial projects. He co-composed the score for the 2020 South African thriller Triggered, and has composed music for promotional films produced by Taschen and The Criterion Collection.

== Musical style ==
Van Wyk's music combines elements of ambient, contemporary classical and electronic music, often incorporating piano, synthesizers, strings, drones and field recordings. Critics have associated his work with the contemporary ambient and post-classical movement.

== Discography ==
=== Studio albums ===
- Days You Remember (White Notebook, 2013)
- Attachment (Home Normal, 2016)
- Opacity (Home Normal, 2017)
- Threads (n5MD, 2021)
- Descendants (n5MD, 2022)
- Inherent (n5MD, 2025)

=== Collaborative albums ===
- Deepriver - Volume One (with Joni Ljungqvist, n5MD, 2023)
- Inertia (with Ian Hawgood, Home Normal, 2026)
- Surroundings (with Ian Hawgood, Home Normal, 2026)

=== EPs ===
- Horizon (n5MD, 2025)
