= Arovane =

German electronic music artist

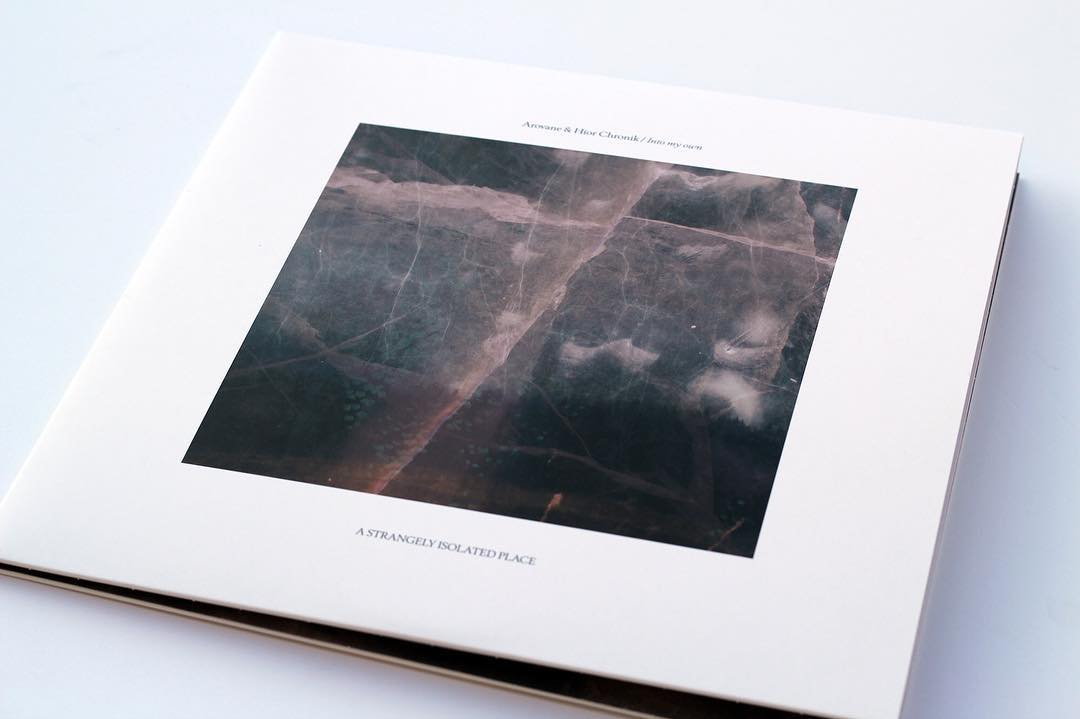

Background information
- Also known as: Nedjev, Uwe Zahn
- Origin: Germany
- Genres: IDM, ambient, electronica
- Years active: 1998–2004, 2013–present
- Labels: DIN, City Centre Offices, n5MD, Quiet Details
- Website: http://arovane.net/

Arovane is the recording name of German electronic music artist Uwe Zahn (born 1965 in Hameln, Germany). He also releases under the moniker Nedjev.

== Life and career ==
Zahn was born in Hameln in 1965. He first began experimenting with rudimentary audio equipment and keyboards when he was 15. Over the years he continued experimenting and developing his sound, even learning to play the clarinet at one point. In the late 80s he began dealing with synthesizers and turntablism as well as deconstruction of hip hop beats. In 1989 Zahn began creating music with a collective of electronic musicians in Munich. This collective, known as S.A.M., was dedicated to creating live, free, electronic improvisational music and operated in Germany.

In 1991 Zahn built his own studio in Berlin. The works around this time could be compared to a breakbeat influenced sound.

Throughout the 90s, Zahn lived in Berlin and continued creating electronic music. After working for a radio station, he caught the attention of electronic music label Din. The late 90s saw the release of his first two albums, Atol Scrap for Din Records and Tides for CCO Records, which gained him a degree of notoriety and acclaim mainly in Germany and then throughout the world in the IDM, ambient, and electronic music scene. There were also a number of compilation appearances and collaborations released during this time.

In 2004, Zahn's album Lilies was released. Significantly, the last track on that album is titled "Good Bye Forever" – after Lilies, there was a nine-year hiatus for Zahn's musical output which ended in 2013 with the release of Ve Palor on the n5MD label.

In 2018, Uwe was interviewed by the Data.Wave webzine.

Tides listed in Pitchfork's 50 Best IDM Albums of all time.

As part of the IOIC's 2026 Silent Film Marathon, arovane will perform a live musical accompaniment to Friedrich Wilhelm Murnau's film “Faust—A German Folk Tale” on October 15, 2026, at the filmpodium in Zurich.

== Discography ==
=== Albums ===
- Atol Scrap (Din, 1999)
- Tides (City Centre Offices, 2000)
- AER (Valid) (Vertical Form, 2001. A collaboration with Phonem)
- Lilies (City Centre Offices, Indigo, 2004)
- Ve Palor (n5MD, 2013)
- In-between (A Strangely Isolated Place, 2015, A collaboration with Hior Chronik)
- Kaziwa (Time Released Sound, 2016, A collaboration with Porya Hatami)
- Into My Own (A Strangely Isolated Place, 2017, A collaboration with Hior Chronik)
- Organisim (Karlrecords, 2017, A collaboration with Porya Hatami)
- Reihen (12k, 2021)
- Skal_Ghost (12k, 2022, A collaboration with Taylor Deupree)
- polymer (Quiet Details, 2023)
- Svev (Polar Seas, 2023, A collaboration with Pjusk)

=== Singles & EPs ===
- Icol Diston (Din, 1998)
- I.O. (Din, 1998)
- PInt (FWD:, 1999)
- AMX (Din, 1999)
- Occer / Silicad (City Centre Offices, 1999)
- Yeer / Disper (Awkward Silence Recordings, 2000) Split EP with Christian Kleine.
- Plecq (Bip Hop Generation v.2, 2001)
- Cycliph (Din, 2002)
- Minth / Neel (City Centre Offices, 2003)
- Aarlenpeers (Touchin' Bass, 2015)

=== Compilations ===
- Icol Diston (Din, 2002. A collection of early releases)
