= Ivette Román-Roberto =

Puerto Rican musician and experimental performer

- Origin: Puerto Rico
- Occupations: Musician, performance artist
- Years active: 1980s–present
- Website: https://ivetteromanroberto.com/

Ivette Román-Roberto, also known as Ivette Román, is a Puerto Rican performer and experimental vocalist known for her work in extended voice performance and free improvisation. She has been performing nationally and internationally since the 1980s, and has been recognized by the National Association of Latino Arts and Culture. According to the Houston Press, "Ivette is the secret weapon of Houston experimental music."

== Early life and education ==
As an adolescent, Román-Roberto received six years of training in piano, viola, and music technique at the Escuela Libre de Música in Puerto Rico. She then received a BA in Art Education at the University of Puerto Rico and completed 32 credits toward an MFA in Theater Arts at the University of California, Los Angeles. She received an MEd in Arts in Education from Cambridge College in Boston, Massachusetts, in 2004.

== Performance career ==
Román began her career as an experimental vocalist in the Los Angeles Poverty Department (LAPD). This group was founded by off-Broadway director John Malpede and involved the collaboration of homeless persons from poor neighborhoods with a small group of resident artists. LAPD made a significant impact within the Californian Performance Art movement of the 1980s. After this experience, Román began to do live presentations in California, and then returned to Puerto Rico in the early 1990s, where she was an active participant in the cultural scene of the Island, collaborating with artist such as Freddie Mercado, Luis Amed Irizarry, Aravind Enrique Adyanthaya, and José Luis Abreu (Fofé) from the rock band Circo. Adyanthaya discusses some of these collaborations in an interview with the scholar Melanie Pérez Ortiz in 2004, focusing on Matropofagia (1999), Lajas (2003), and Íconos de vellonera. In the 2000s Román moved to Houston, Texas, where she currently resides, but she continues to perform in Puerto Rico periodically. In 2021-2022, she formed part of the Novenario exhibit at the Puerto Rico Museum of Contemporary Art. Her work has been analyzed by performance studies scholars such as Lydia Platón Lázaro, Marina Barsy Janer, and Lawrence La Fountain-Stokes.

== Performance style ==
Román-Roberto has stated that her "voice work has gone through a slow but consistent change since the beginning of [her] art career, from strongly performative to minimalist, with a continuous unresolved tension that has to do with challenging the colonial programming inherited through my upbringing while at the same time keeping an almost religious loyalty and reverence to some components of that programming." She also indicates that "My voice is my art venue, the space I create to give myself an opportunity within the art world. Voice improvisation is the portal to the place where there are no limitations and I can be the person I always wanted to be outside the script of discrimination."

=== Hummus Terroristas Todos ===
Román-Roberto's vocal and body performance style is apparent in her performance Hummus Terroristas Todos, which was published by the Cuban theater journal Conjunto in 2009, with an introduction by the noted theater critic Vivian Martínez Tabares. Hummus Terroristas Todos has also been analyzed by the Puerto Rican theater and performance studies scholar Jade Power-Sotomayor, who discusses this performance in her 2012 dissertation "Speaking Bodies: Body Bilinguality and Code-switching in Latina/o Performance." Power-Sotomayor highlights the interplay between Román-Roberto's voice, body, and the movement of her hands, indicating that "Through a simple yet culturally-specific gesture, Román uses her body to situate herself as gendered, Puerto Rican, racialized, and colonized, inviting the audience to identify with her, participate and enjoy this moment of recognition. Yet through this same gesture, she actively resists, questions and destabilizes these categories of belonging, demonstrating how her body can confuse the space between the literal and the figurative, be both an object of social power and an agent with a performative oppositional power" (18-19).

== Performances/Compositions ==
- 1995 – Las Voces del Maleficio (Biennial of Visual Poetry, UNAM, Mexico City and Rompeforma Performance Marathon, Fine Arts Center, Puerto Rico)
- 1997 – Sinfonia del Silencio con Cuatro Movimientos Necesarios (Sound Poetry Festival Bologna, Italy, and the Laryngitis Festival in San Juan, Puerto Rico)
- 1998 – I Love You with All my Heart (Batie Festival, Geneva, Switzerland)
- 1998 – Cuatrienio (100 años después… 100 artistas contemporáneos: reflexiones en torno a la presencia norteamericana, San Juan, Puerto Rico)
- 1999 – Matropofagia by Mayra Santos-Febres (lead performer, with Lydia Platón, San Germán, Puerto Rico)
- 2001 – Sinfonia Comic Guitar (Second Hemispheric Institute of Performance and Politics Encuentro in Monterrey, Mexico)
- 2002 – Círculo (Third Hemispheric Institute of Performance and Politics Encuentro in Lima, Peru)
- 2005 – Hummus Terroristas Todos (Mixta Con Tod@s, Teatro Estudio Yerbabruja, Río Piedras, Puerto Rico)
- 2008 – Living Room Art: "Brown in the Third Ward" (showcasing artist, Houston, Texas)
- 2015 – Directed Réquiem, a community singing project, at Patio Taller in Carolina, Puerto Rico.
- 2019 – Singer/activator for Okwui Okpokwasili’s Sitting on a Man's Head (CounterCurrent Festival)
- 2019 – Played a part for filmmaker Beatriz Santiago Muñoz’s production Verano de Mujeres

== Awards and fellowships ==
- 1994 – Merit Award from Fondo Nacional Para El Financiamiento Del Quehacer Cultural of the Institute of Puerto Rican Culture
- 1995 – Travel Fellowship to participate as a performer in Spain: PSBA Program, Instituto de Cultura Puertorriqueña
- 1997 – Affiliation Certificate given by the Institute of Puerto Rican Culture as national cantautora (singer-songwriter)
- 2000 – Felisa Rincón de Gautier Foundation fellowship to do the political cabaret show, Círculo, at the Sylvia Rexach Café-Teatro; Performing Arts Center of Puerto Rico
- 2001 – Travel Fellowship of the Institute of Puerto Rican Culture to participate in the Encounter of Latin American Performance Artists, Mexico, as a performer and panel guest

== See also ==
- List of Puerto Ricans
- Puerto Ricans in the United States
- List of experimental musicians
