= Dead Start Program =

Studio album by John Tejada
- Released: February 9, 2018
- Length: 49:58
- Label: Kompakt

John Tejada chronology
Signs Under Test (2015)	Dead Start Program (2018)

Professional ratings
Aggregate scores
Source	Rating
Metacritic	73/100
Review scores
Source	Rating
AllMusic	4/5 stars
Exclaim!	(7/10)
PopMatters	(7/10)

Dead Start Program is the eleventh studio album by American Techno DJ/producer John Tejada. It was released in February 2018 under Kompakt. Dead Start Program was also the name of the 2007 EP by Irish electronic music act Dark Room Notes. The cover of Tejada’s album references the same image that DRN took their EP name from, 11 years before Tejada.

== Track listing ==
No.	Title	Length
1.	"Autoseek"	4:01
2.	"Detector"	5:21
3.	"Sleep Spindle"	4:25
4.	"Hypochondriac"	5:24
5.	"Loss"	3:03
6.	"The Looping Generation"	4:36
7.	"Telemetry"	3:59
8.	"Duty Cycle"	5:18
9.	"All at Sea"	3:58
10.	"Heal"	5:14
11.	"Quipu"	4:39
