= Home Normal =

Japanese record label

- Founded: 2008
- Founder: Ian Hawgood
- Distributor: P*Dis (JP)
- Genre: Ambient, Post-classical, Modern-classical, Electroacoustic
- Country of origin: Japan
- Location: Japan
- Official website: homenormal.com

Home Normal is a record label founded in Tokyo in December 2008 and launched in March 2009. The label was curated by Ian Hawgood, co-run with Ben Jones, with design assistance from Jeremy Bible and Christian Roth until 2016. Initially based exclusively in Tokyo, Home Normal relocated in 2016 to Warsaw, Poland, and then to Brighton, United Kingdom, late 2019.

The label specializes in minimal music, with their releases branching between post-classical, experimental ambient, drone and electronica. They've released over 200 albums to date.

== Artists ==
The following are artists with releases on Home Normal:

- Asuna
- bvdub
- Stefano Guzzetti
- Tobias Hellkvist
- Library Tapes
- Gareth Davis
- Ken Ikeda
- David Toop
- Taishi Kamiya
- Machinefabriek
- Federico Durand
- James Murray
- Jason van Wyk
- Giulio Aldinucci
- Hotel Neon
- Wil Bolton
- Mere
- M. Ostermeier
- Ghost And Tape
- Greg Davis
- Stijn Hüwels
- Félicia Atkinson
- Pleq
- Hakobune
- Chihei Hatakeyama
- Far away Nebraska

== Sub-Labels ==
Besides the main catalog, Home Normal has a number of sub-labels that it manages. These include:

- Folk Reels
- Nomadic Kids Republic
- Koen Music
- Tokyo Droning
- Sleep Loops
- Stella Recordings
- Minimal Maps
- Constellations x Artefacts

== See also ==
- List of record labels
- List of independent record labels
- List of electronic music record labels
