= Lights Out Asia =

American post-rock and electronic band

- Origin: Milwaukee, Wisconsin
- Genres: Post-rock; downtempo; electronica; shoegaze
- Years active: 2003–present
- Labels: n5MD (US), Zankyo (Japan)
- Members: Mike Ystad; Chris Schafer
- Past members: Mike Rush

Lights Out Asia is a Milwaukee, Wisconsin based post-rock and electronic band that formed in February 2003.

== History ==
Lights Out Asia formed in Milwaukee, Wisconsin in February 2003 when Chris Schafer and Mike Ystad, former members of Aurore Rien, decided to abandon the traditional post-rock band concept of their previous group and explore the intersection of post-rock, electronic and ambient music. In a short period, the two had written enough material for a full length album. This work would come to be known as Garmonia, Lights Out Asia's first documented recording as a band. Garmonia was released in 2003 to favorable reviews. By October 2003 the group was already opening for Mogwai.

Shortly after the release of Garmonia, Lights Out Asia added bassist/guitarist Mike Rush to the lineup. The band was signed to electronic label n5MD in 2007, and has released three albums on that imprint, as well as several remixes and contributions to the Chicago-based electronic/industrial label Tympanik. The band released In the Days of Jupiter in 2010, followed by Hy-Brasil in 2012.

The band is known for their blending of synthesized atmospheres, samples and electronic beats with tracks of effects-laden delayed guitars. Chris Schafer's vocals are often mixed low, treated almost as another instrument, akin to dream-pop or shoegazing arrangements.

== Members ==
- Mike Ystad - electronics
- Chris Schafer - guitar, vocals

=== Former members ===
- Mike Rush - guitar, bass

== Discography ==
=== Albums ===
- Garmonia (2003)
- Tanks and Recognizers (2007)
- Eyes Like Brontide (2008)
- In the Days of Jupiter (2010)
- Hy-Brasil (2012)

=== Compilations ===
- Test Tones Vol. 4 (2005) - "Knock Knock"
- Little Darla Has a Treat For You Vol.25 (2007) - "Airports, Crying Airplanes"
- Emerging Organisms Vol.2 (2008) - "Outstretched To the Middle of the Sky"
- One Five Zero (2009) - "Psiu! Puxa!"

== See also ==
- List of ambient music artists
- List of post-rock bands
