= Obsil =

- Origin: Siena, Italy
- Genres: Ambient, classical, experimental
- Years active: 1999 to 2011
- Labels: Psychonavigation Records, Disasters by Choice Records
- Members: Giulio Aldinucci

Obsil was a musical project of the Italian composer Giulio Aldinucci (born in Siena, 1981). The word "Obsil" stands for observing silence. Even though his musical research is focused mainly on electro-acoustic and experimental music, he also composes music for acoustic instruments. His first two albums, Points (2006) and Distances (2009) were released on CD by Disasters by Choice Records. In April 2011, the Irish label Psychonavigation Records released Vicino, his third album.

== Discography ==
=== Albums ===
- (2006) Points CD (Disasters by Choice Records)
- (2009) Distances CD (Disasters by Choice Records)
- (2011) Vicino CD (Psychonavigation Records)

=== Collaborations ===
- (2009) Various - Italian Plays digital (Grey Sparkle)

=== Compilations (exclusive tracks only) ===
- (2011) Various - The Wire Tapper 25 CD (The Wire)
- (2010) Various - Con fuoco d'occhi un nostalgico lupo digital (Lost Children Net Label)
- (2010) Various - Hush Noise CDr and digital (Inglorious Ocean)
- (2011) Various - Underwater Noises CDr and digital (Ephre Imprint)

=== Remixes ===
- (2008) Pcc - Manzotin Mantra 12" vinyl (MCL, Misty Circles)
- (2010) ME:MO - Acoustic View CD (Disasters by Choice Records)
