= Debug (magazine) =

German magazine

May 2009 cover

De:Bug was a German magazine covering "electronic aspects of life", published monthly in Berlin from 1997 to 2014. Following a new definition of culture, the magazine kept track of electronic music styles such as techno, electro or house, as well as all intersections of daily life with digital technology, focusing on the internet as a social space influenced by issues such as interface design, web art, and file sharing. A second focus was on hardware, the latest computer games and software for musicians and other creative professionals. In the sixteen years of its existence, it published more than 50,000 reviews.

== Overview ==
In 1997, De:Bug was founded by Alexander Baumgardt, Mercedes Bunz, Jan Rikus Hillmann, Sascha Kösch, Paul Paulun, Riley Reinhold and Benjamin Weiss. The magazine was based in the Prenzlauer Berg district of Berlin, close to record labels, clubs, Internet companies and fashion labels. Its authors were music producers, DJs, radio hosts, software designers, graphic designers or bloggers, and thus themselves part of the culture described by De:Bug. Members of the core editorial team included Sascha Kösch, Thaddeus Herrmann, Jan Wehn, Felix Knoke and Timo Feldhaus.

De:Bug's avant-garde layout was characterized by its distinctive fonts. The magazine received the Red Dot Award for high design quality, the Award of Excellence of the European Newspaper Design Award and a LeadAward top spot.

The circulation was 26,782 copies in March 2014. The magazine was an independent publishing company under the management of Sascha Kösch. In March 2014, Kösch announced that issue 181 would be the last, citing economic reasons, in particular the general crisis of print media.
