= A Life of Science =

American electronic rock band

A Life of Science is an American electronic rock band, based in Phoenix, Arizona. The band is known for their diverse and intricate style, as well as their concept-based multimedia album, The Apneist, which was released in 2009. The band was formed in 2006 by vocalist James (Jimmy) Keenan, guitarist Zakk Geist, and guitarist/keyboard player JD Tate. They incorporate various influences including progressive rock, hardcore, electronica, post-punk and pop rock into their sound.

== History ==
A Life of Science began in the summer of 2006 when long time friends James Keenan (vocals/bass/synth), Zakk Geist (guitar/screams/programming), and JD Tate (guitar/keyboard/tech) found themselves back in their hometown of Phoenix, Arizona, after moving away for college. They recruited James' friend from Northern Arizona University, Scott Passamonte, to play guitar. The three then auditioned drummer Angel Garcia to complete the band.

In the fall of 2007, A Life of Science self-released a self-produced EP, consisting of four songs, called the A Life of Science EP. The EP was tracked at the Conservatory of Recording Arts and Sciences in Mesa, Arizona, and at the band's home studio in Phoenix.

A Life of Science recorded The Apneist, a concept album, in the summer of 2007 with producer Larry Elyea at Mind's Eye Digital (Jimmy Eat World, Eyes Set to Kill), who described the album as "One of the most challenging and enjoyable records I've done to date. This record is a rollercoaster ride into uncharted territories of sonics and emotion."

The band also released their debut comic book, The Apneist Issue #0, in Fall 2009 at the Baltimore Comic Con. Additional comic books, a film, a novel, and more projects, based on the story of The Apneist, are currently in production.

In March 2011, A Life of Science returned to the studio and recorded the 2nd and 3rd albums of the trilogy. Their lineup this time around consisted of only Keenan and Passomonte, with help from drummer Ben Anderson (Digital Summer, Comfort for Change). In May 2012, they released their sophomore album "Vita Nova." Their third album, "Crystal City," was released on December 11, 2012.

== Band members ==
- James Keenan - Vocals, bass, synth, programming
- Scott Passamonte - Guitar
- Travis Alexander - Bass Guitar
- Josh Isaac - Drums

== Former members ==
- Zakk Geist - Guitar, screams, programming
- Anthony Gabuzzi - Guitar
- Matty Steinkamp - Backup vocals
- JD Tate - Keyboards, Guitar
- Angel Garcia - Drums
- Ben Anderson - Drums
- Dustin Failner - Drums
- John Moy - Drums

== Discography ==
- A Life of Science EP (2007)
- The Apneist (2009)
- Vita Nova (2012)
- Crystal City (2012)
