= Bvdub =

American electronic music producer

bvdub
- Also known as: East of Oceans; Earth House Hold
- Born: Brock Van Wey; 1974 (age 51–52); Livermore, California, United States
- Origin: Shaoxing, China
- Genres: Ambient; ambient techno
- Years active: 2007–present
- Labels: Darla Records; Home Normal; Quietus Recordings
- Website: bvdub.org

Brock Van Wey, better known by his stage name bvdub, is an American electronic music producer originally from the San Francisco Bay Area. Since 2007, he has released more than 100 albums and EPs as bvdub, under his birth name, and under the aliases East of Oceans and Earth House Hold.

Residing in Shaoxing, China, he produces ambient and ambient techno music that has received critical acclaim from the likes of online magazines such as Resident Advisor, Headphone Commute and Gridface. His first release as Brock Van Wey, White Clouds Drift On and On, was included in Resident Advisor's Top 20 Albums of 2009.

== Overview ==
Brock Van Wey was born in 1974 and grew up in Livermore, near San Francisco. He was classically trained in music as a child and from the age of five he was taught violin and, later, piano. By age eleven he had composed his first piece of music for cello, violin and viola, and had written several more pieces by his mid-teens. Feeling that he did not actually enjoy classical music and preferring instead to "remix" the pieces he learned in his head, he eventually gave it up altogether. In the early 1990s he heard a mixtape of deep house music that would inspire him to pursue electronic music himself. He was soon performing as a deep house and ambient DJ, and appearing regularly at raves in San Francisco, initially under his own name and later under the bvdub moniker. Van Wey composed his first electronic piece in 1993, an industrial techno track that differed significantly in style to the music he would later produce.

In 2001, Van Wey relocated to China, having become disillusioned with the music scene in San Francisco. There, he began work as an English professor, teaching over 200 students. It was not until 2006 that he began to produce his own music, after a friend of his spent time teaching him various pieces of hardware and software. His first release as bvdub was the Strength in Solitude LP in 2007, an album which comprises the first six tracks he created in the order that they were made.

Also in 2007, Van Wey founded the label Quietus Recordings in reaction to his friends' music being turned down by other record labels for being "too self-indulgent" or "too deep". The label encourages its artists to present only the music by which they would want to be remembered; to make each release as personal as possible, Van Wey takes the photos for the CD label and the cover art himself whilst listening to the music that the images are to accompany. The label has released bvdub's own recordings, as well as productions by Quantec and Arc of Doves.

Following a period of living once more in San Francisco, Van Wey returned to China, and a mutual friend soon put him in touch with the indie label Darla Records. Van Wey has since released several albums on the label, including Resistance Is Beautiful (2011) and Serenity (2012).

In 2018, he contributed to "The Ambient Files", a mix CD project by Stars Over Foy.

== Name ==
The name bvdub was suggested to Van Wey by a colleague and is simply a shortening of his initials, BVW, rather than being intended to denote dub or dub techno music. Van Wey describes his own music as electronic, ambient and ambient techno, though prefers not to categorize it at all, and has stated that he has never produced anything he would personally associate with dub; however, he has worked with dub techno label and production duo Echospace, who released his album White Clouds Drift On and On, and whose member Intrusion remixed it in full.

== Selected discography ==
=== Albums ===
- Strength in Solitude LP (2007)
- Return to Tonglu (2008)
- We Were the Sun (2009)
- White Clouds Drift On and On (as Brock Van Wey) (2009)
- The Art of Dying Alone (2010)
- Tribes at the Temple of Silence (2011)
- Songs for a Friend I Left Behind (2011)
- Resistance Is Beautiful (2011)
- When Love Lived (as Earth House Hold) (2012)
- 121 Years (as East of Oceans) (2012)
- Don’t Say You Know (2012)
- Serenity (2012)
- All Is Forgiven (2012)
- A Careful Ecstasy (2013)
- Erebus (with Loscil) (2013)
- I'll Only Break Your Heart (2014)
- A Thousand Words (2016)
- Yours Are Stories of Sadness (2016)
- Epilogues for the End of the Sky (2017)
- Drowning in Daylight (2018)
- Explosions in Slow Motion (2019)
- Ten Times the World Lied (2020)
- Hard Times, Hard Hearts (2021)
- Violet Opposition (2022)
- Fumika Fades (2023)
- Tsunami (as East of Oceans) (2024)
- In Iron Houses (2024)
- 13 (2025)
- SITE (Original Score by bvdub) (2025)
- The Catastrophe Machine (2026)

=== EPs ===
- I Never Cried a Tear (2007)
- To Live (2009)
- See Through You (as Earth House Hold) (2013)
- Broken Seas (as East of Oceans) (2017)

=== Compilations ===
- Tech from Times Past (2015)
