= Chihei Hatakeyama =

Japanese musician (born 1978)

Chihei Hatakeyama 畠山地平
- Born: 1978 (age 47–48); Kanagawa Prefecture
- Website: www.chihei.org

Chihei Hatakeyama (畠山地平, Hatakeyama Chihei; born in 1978, Kanagawa Prefecture) is an electronic music artist from Tokyo, Japan. He grew up in the suburbs of Fujisawa. He released his first full-length album, Minima Moralia on Kranky in 2006. He is the owner of the record label White Paddy Mountain which he launched in 2010.

Hatakeyama's music is characteristically very slow, composed by repeatedly processing guitars, pianos, and vibraphones on a laptop. The result is a mix of droning chords and sparse single instruments rising above the mix. His music may be classified as either ambient music, experimental music or new-age music. Chihei Hatakeyama has released over 70 albums as of 2020.

== Discography ==
- Minima Moralia (2006), Kranky
- Dedication (2008), Magic Book
- Saunter (2009), Under the Spire
- August (2009), Room40
- The River (2009), Hibernate
- The Secret Distance of Tochka (2009), Boid
- White Sun (2009), taâlem
- Live at Nagoya (2009)
- A Long Journey (2010), Home Normal
- Ghostly Garden (2010), Own
- Variations (2010), Soundscaping
- Void (2010), White Paddy Mountain
- Mirror (2011), Room40
- Air (2011), Whereabouts – with naph
- White Night (2011), White Paddy Mountain
- Red (2011), White Paddy Mountain
- Void II (2012), White Paddy Mountain
- Norma (2012), Small Fragments
- Scale Compositions (2012), Home Normal – with Asuna
- Void III (2013), White Paddy Mountain
- Bare Strata (2013), Whereabouts
- The Bull Head Emperor (2013), Rural Colours
- Alone by the Sea (2013), White Paddy Mountain
- Void IV (2013), White Paddy Mountain
- Midnight in Hsinking (2013), duenn
- Sacrifice for Pleasure (2013), Airplane
- Void V (2014), White Paddy Mountain
- Void VI (2014), White Paddy Mountain
- It Is, It Isn't (2014) – Chihei Hatakeyama & Hakobune
- Winter Storm (2014)
- Too Much Sadness (2014)
- Falling Sun (2014), Rural Colours – with Good Weather for an Airstrike
- Live at Ftarri Doubtmusic Festival (2014), Meenna – with Kiyoshi Mizutani and Hello
- Mist (2015), White Paddy Mountain
- Frozen Silence (2015), White Paddy Mountain – with Sakana Hosomi
- Moon Light Reflecting Over Mountains (2015), Room40
- Void VII (2015), White Paddy Mountain
- Magical Imaginary Child (2015), White Paddy Mountain – with Federico Durand
- Five Dreams (2015), White Paddy Mountain
- Void VIII (2015), White Paddy Mountain
- Moss (2015), White Paddy Mountain – with Ken Ikeda
- The Storm of Silence (2016), Glacial Movements – with Dirk Serries
- Void IX (2016), White Paddy Mountain
- You're Still in It (2016), Constellation Tatsu
- Requiem for Black Night and Earth Spiders (2016), White Paddy Mountain
- Euphotic (2016), White Paddy Mountain – with Corey Fuller
- Grace (2016), White Paddy Mountain
- The Fall Rises (2016), White Paddy Mountain – with Hakobune
- Coastal Railroads in Memories (2016), White Paddy Mountain
- Above the Desert (2016), Dronarivm
- Sora (2017), White Paddy Mountain – with Federico Durand
- Void X (2017), White Paddy Mountain
- Void XI (2017), White Paddy Mountain
- Void XII (2017), White Paddy Mountain
- Mirage (2017), Room40
- Void XIII (2017), White Paddy Mountain
- Lunar Eclipse (2017), White Paddy Mountain – with Tamaru
- Void XIV (2017), White Paddy Mountain
- Maybe (2017), White Paddy Mountain
- Heavy Snow (2017), White Paddy Mountain
- Far From the Atmosphere (2017), Hiss Noise
- Void XV (2018), White Paddy Mountain
- Solitary Universe (2018), Aagoo – with Eraldo Bernocchi
- Void XVI (2018), White Paddy Mountain
- Journey to the End of August (2018), Hidden Vibes
- Scene (2018), Constellation Tatsu
- Butterfly's Summer and Vanished (2018), White Paddy Mountain
- FTS002 (2018), First Terrace – with Vida Vojić
- Afterimage (2018), White Paddy Mountain
- Void XVII (2018), White Paddy Mountain
- Live at St Giles (2018), First Terrace – with Specimens
- Erroribus humanis et antinomy, OTOOTO (2019) – with Tetuzi Akiyama and Ken Ikeda
- Void XVIII (2019), White Paddy Mountain
- Jodo (2019), White Paddy Mountain – with Stijn Hüwels
- Void XIX (2019), White Paddy Mountain
- Ghost Woods (2019), White Paddy Mountain
- Forgotten Hill (2019), Room40
- Illusion Harbor (2020), Subcontinental
- Crescent Moon (2020), EndTitles
- Void XX (2020), White Paddy Mountain
- Blue Goat (2020), Longform Editions
- Studio Improvisation in June 12th (2020), Ochiai Soup
- Late Spring (2021), Gearbox Records
- Magnificent Little Dudes, Vol. 1 - with Shun Ishiwaka (2024), Gearbox
- Magnificent Little Dudes, Vol. 2 - with Shun Ishiwaka (2024), Gearbox
- Lucid Dreams (2025), First Terrace
