= SubtractiveLAD =

Canadian musician (born 1974)

subtractiveLAD
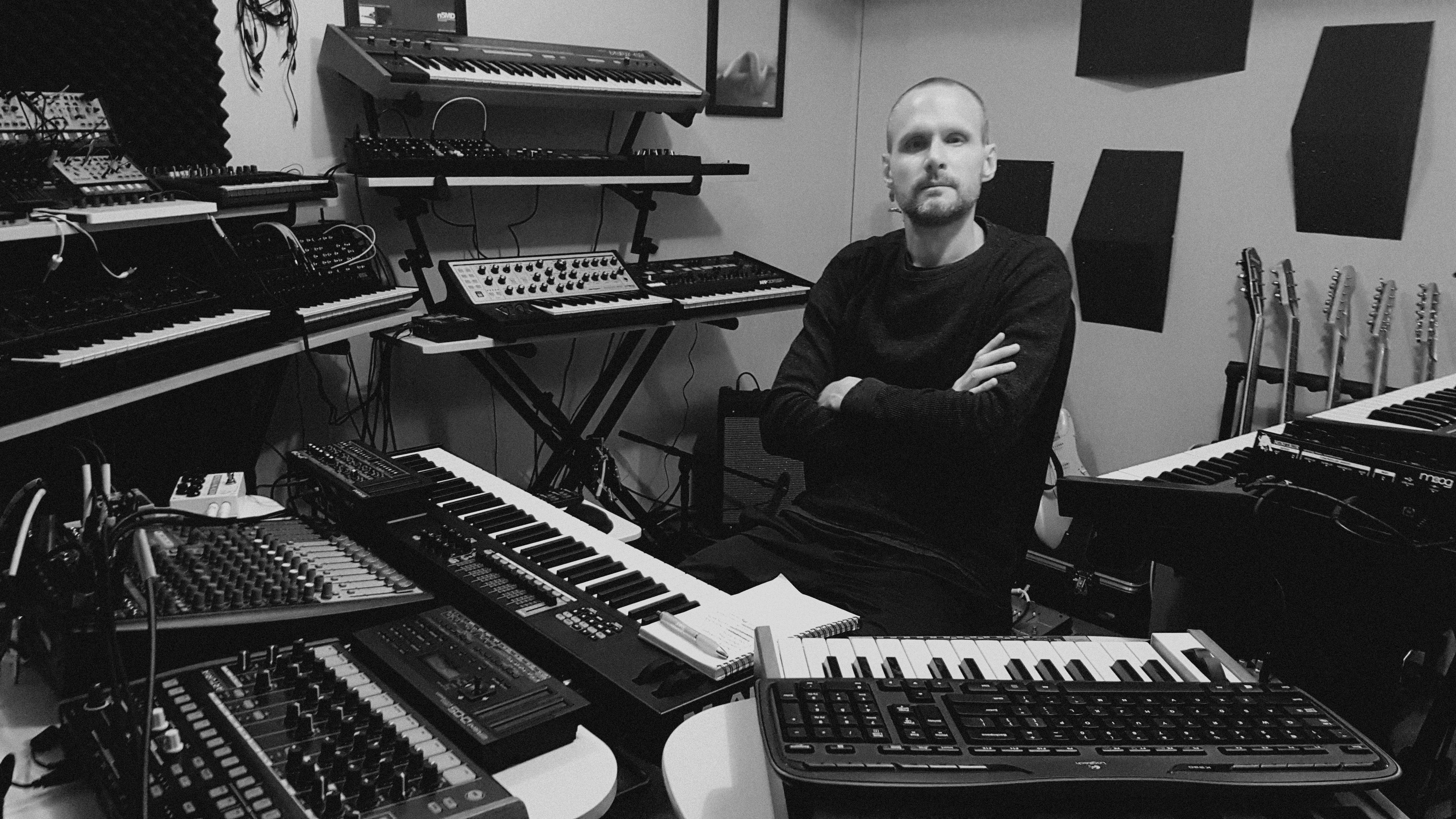
- subtractiveLAD in his studio

Background information
- Born: Stephen Christopher Hummel; 20 October 1974 (age 52)
- Origin: Vancouver, British Columbia, Canada
- Genres: ambient, electronic
- Occupations: Electronic Musician, Producer, Performer
- Instruments: Synthesizer, Keyboard, Guitar, Vocal, Percussion
- Years active: 2005–present
- Labels: n5MD, Self-Released
- Website: subtractivelad.com

SubtractiveLAD is the electronic/ambient music project of Stephen Hummel, from Vancouver, British Columbia, Canada.

== Discography ==
- Giving Up The Ghost (2005)
- Suture (2006)
- No Man's Land (2007)
- Apparatus (2008)
- Where The Land Meets The Sky (2009)
- Life at the End of the World (2010)
- Kindred (2011)
- The Language of Flowers (2013)
- First Steps (2014)
- Wilderness (2014)
- Paths (2014)
- Nucleus (2016)
- Sustain/Release (2017)
- Ellipsis (2017)
- Ritual (2017)
- Signal (2018)
- Past the Horizon (2018)
- Everything We Failed to Be (2018)
- Within and Without (2018)
- Calm (2019)
- Parabola (2019)
- The Time After the Time Before (2019)
- The Echo and the Man (2019)
- Skin and Bones (2020)
- Mercy (2020)
- The Middle of Nowhere (2020)
- Aftermath (2021)
- Static Clouds (2021)
- Weightless (2021)
- Rising Tide (2021)
- Fade (2021)
- Granular Electric Guitar (2021)
- Without Your Love (2021)
- Wreckage (2022)
- Consumed (2022)
- Time Scale (2022)
- Across the Cloudless Sky (2022)
- Minor Deities (2022)
- Fortress (2022)
- A Tree in Winter (2023)
- Creature of Habit (2023)
- The Second Foundation (2023)
- Ocean (with Tamika Roberts, 2023)
- Brutalist (2024)
- Unspoken (2024)
- Method (2026)
- A Break In the Weather (2026)
- Still (2026)
- Onward (2026)
- Inward (2026)
- The River (2026)
- Signifier (2026)
- Collide (2026)

== Film Music ==
- Fierce Light
- Glorious
- Build It
