= Orange Monkey =

American experimental rock band

Orange Monkey is an American experimental rock band from California. The band currently consists of Aukey, Crystal, Mc Ryan, Dave and a penguin named Hiyo (formerly known as The Mysterious Hiyo.) The music is kitsch, quirky and satirical, with choppy editing and obscure references to the Power Rangers, Kerri Strug, ITT Tech and Pokémon.

Aukey, MC Ryan and Hiyo formed Orange Monkey in 1994 with the debut performance of their song "Fungus Amongus" (now referred to as "OG Fungus Amongus") recorded live. Not much is known about the time between that recording and 1998, when Crystal joined the band and became romantically involved with Aukey. Coining the term "The Last Free Band" due to their reliance on donations and refusal to charge money for their music (at the time), their debut release, Turtles In Love, was a barely navigable melange of genres, including electronica, funk, hip-hop and thrashcore. In between each of the songs was a sample from a Barney the Dinosaur Speak & Spell-type toy which spelled out "ORANGE MONKEY". The album also featured a reworking of "Fungus Amongus" (referred to early on as the Tinactin Mix) as well as "Joey VS Frog", dedicated to a fan who donated the CD burner that was used to produce the album.

The second release, Help Us Buy Mp3.com A Taco!, was an exclusive CD (now unavailable) made for MP3.com, containing old favourites as well as two new tracks, "TJ Tech" and "(Unrecognizable Song)", which was dedicated to another fan after he had a dream about the band performing at a retirement home. Live performances were quite sporadic, usually in and around the area of Los Angeles. More tracks were released, appearing on various sites such as the IUMA and MP3.com. Special, personalized CDs were given out to various fans who were closest to the band. It is reasonable to suggest that this was the precursor to the release of Cheap Shot Beefcake, an exclusive CD (now unavailable) made for Rolling Stone Magazine's site. Like HUBMAT!, this release featured many old tracks as well as several, recently recorded tracks. In 2001 for more than three months (August - November) Orange Monkey held the number one spot on Rolling Stone Magazines Unsigned Artist charts with their hit single "Britney Spears Vs. Trojan Man".

After briefly changing the band name to Orange Monkey.net and hiring (and firing) new band members Dave and David, Phat Berries was released. The album contained very focused songwriting, relatively new effects and less of the satirical value that Turtles In Love embodied. The band's playful exuberance and signature sound remained intact, despite sounding slightly more glam rock and doo-wop-oriented. At least for one show was performed on the sidewalk in front of artist Levon Jihanians exhibit opening in Glendale, powered by Mc Ryans (running) car and using the headlights for lighting. The band continued to tour around California, performing in and losing at various Battle Of The Bands competitions.

A third full-length album, ONKA (short for Our Next Krappy Album) was released early 2006.

== Discography ==
- Turtles In Love (1999)
- Help Us Buy Mp3.com A Taco! (2000)
- Cheap Shot Beefcake (2002)
- Turtles In Love (reissue) (2003)
- Phat Berries (2004)
- ONKA (2006)
- Wayne (2008)
