= Giulio Aldinucci =

Italian composer

- Origin: Siena, Italy
- Genres: Contemporary music, experimental, ambient
- Occupation: composer
- Instruments: electronics, field recordings
- Years active: 1999–present
- Labels: Karlrecords, 99chants, Home Normal, Time Released Sound, Dronarivm, Nomadic Kids Republic
- Website: www.giulioaldinucci.com

Giulio Aldinucci (born 1981 in Siena) is an Italian composer working primarily in the field of experimental electroacoustic music. His practice encompasses composition, soundscape composition, and the use of archival materials, investigating the relationship between past and present. Through field recording as both method and medium, Aldinucci problematizes the distinction between the “natural” - conceived as the contingent and unregulated sonority of environmental phenomena - and the “artificial,” understood as the product of technologically mediated processes of capture, transformation, and recontextualization. The Wire described Aldinucci's approach to ambient music as elevating it beyond its conventional role as an aural backdrop.

He has released albums on labels including Karlrecords (Germany), 99chants (Germany), Home Normal (UK/Japan), Time Released Sound (USA), Dronarivm (Netherlands) and Nomadic Kids Republic (UK/Japan). He has also published EPs and collaborative albums with artists such as Enrico Coniglio, The Star Pillow, Ian Hawgood, Francis M. Gri, Francesco Giannico, and Pleq.

In addition to his solo and collaborative works, Aldinucci has created installations, performances and composed music for theatre, video art, experimental radio and cinema. His music has appeared in various compilations, including Sound at Work – electronic music and labour produced by Tempo Reale, and the celebratory 50th issue of The Wire Tapper.

== Biography ==
Giulio Aldinucci was born in Siena (Italy) in 1981, he began composing in his teenage years. Aldinucci has a musical and an academic linguistics background. In 2001 he started the project Obsil (the word Obsil stands for "observing silence"): under this name, he released three albums between 2006 and 2011. His first album, Tarsia, was released in August 2012 by the Anglo-Japanese label Nomadic Kids Republic (Home Normal sister label).

In June 2013, taking their cue from Gianmarco Del Re’s column on Fluid Radio, which profiles sound artists and musicians currently operating within the Italian electroacoustic scene, Giulio Aldinucci and Attilio Novellino translated the Postcards from Italy project into an album published on CD by Oak Editions, a live event at Cafe Oto and a special installation at SoundFjord Gallery by AIPS collective & Gianmarco Del Re. The Italian presentation of the Postcards From Italy project took place at Spazio O' in Milan on 1 February 2014. The Postcards from Italy album was included on the 2013 "Top Ten Field Recording & Soundscape" by A Closer Listen.

His third album, Spazio Sacro (“Sacred Space” in English), was released in 2015 by Time Released Sound. The seven tracks that compose Spazio Sacro are characterized by field recordings taken in places that are related to the idea of “sacred” in different ways. The starting point is a reflection on how human rites define new soundscapes (e.g. processions, architecture of churches and cathedrals or ruins of isolated mountain sanctuaries). The audio material has been manipulated and the music has been written in a constant dialogue with the artist's personal memories, especially those from childhood, when in his area (a small village in Tuscany, Italy) religious rites still marked the pace of the community life throughout the year.

His fifth album Borders and Ruins was released by Karlrecords in 2017. The album is a reflection on the instability of borders - borders as an extreme attempt to discriminate and rationalize that turns into a source of chaos and cultural ruins on both sides - and their impact on the relationship between people and territory. It is also a sonic diary focused on this relationship.

His composition Mute Sirens was awarded with an honourable mention at the 18th International Electroacoustic Composition Competition Música Viva 2017.

His sixth album Disappearing in a Mirror was released by Karlrecords in 2018 on vinyl and cd. This work shows a peculiar approach on ambient drone music. Where its predecessor Borders and Ruins was a reflection on the instability of borders, Disappearing in a Mirror raises the very personal question of identity. The album focuses on the fluidity of the identity concept, highlighting the harmonious coexistence of contradictory elements and the transitional features that characterize every transformation. It is a reflection on the current situation of change and disruption and at the same time it is a gaze into the human timeless soul and its inner soundscapes.

His eighth album Shards of Distant Times was released by Karlrecords in 2020 on vinyl and cd. As it is the third album Giulio Aldinucci has recorded for Karlrecords, it may be considered part of a triptych. Borders and Ruins proved to be a remarkably timely work, appearing in the early days of Brexit and the discourse surrounding Trump’s wall, while 2018’s Disappearing in a Mirror examined more internal boundaries between “the self and the world.” Shards of Distant Times turns to the porous membrane between past and present, while simultaneously engaging with the internet as a sonic medium. This album explores the liminal zones of the contemporary soundscape, characterized by the presence of the human voice emerging from old and timeworn recordings. Drawing on auditory pareidolia - the psychological phenomenon in which the mind perceives indistinct voices in random noise - voices and fragments of music seem to surface from the everyday soundscape via omnipresent internet-connected devices, generating perceptual “glitches” across time and space.

== Discography ==
=== Albums ===
- (2026) Materia LP, digital (Karlrecords)
- (2022) Real LP, MC, digital (Karlrecords)
- (2020) Shards of Distant Times LP, CD, digital (Karlrecords)
- (2019) No Eye Has an Equal LP, MC, digital (99chants)
- (2018) Disappearing in a Mirror LP, CD, digital (Karlrecords)
- (2017) Borders and Ruins LP, digital (Karlrecords)
- (2016) Goccia CD, digital (Home Normal)
- (2015) Spazio Sacro CD, digital (Time Released Sound)
- (2014) Aer CD, digital (Dronarivm)
- (2012) Tarsia CD, digital (Nomadic Kids Republic)

=== Collaborations ===
- (2020) Enrico Coniglio & Giulio Aldinucci Stalking the Elusive CD, digital (Dronarivm)
- (2018) Giulio Aldinucci & The Star Pillow Hidden CD, digital (Midira)
- (2018) Ian Hawgood & Giulio Aldinucci Consequence Shadows CD, digital (Home Normal)
- (2017) Francesco Giannico & Giulio Aldinucci Reframing CD, digital (Eilean)
- (2017) Giulio Aldinucci & Francis M. Gri Segmenti CD, digital (KrysaliSound)
- (2016) Francesco Giannico & Giulio Aldinucci Agoraphonia CD, digital (Dronarivm)
- (2015) Pleq & Giulio Aldinucci The Prelude To CD, digital (The Long Story Recording Company)

=== EPs ===
- (2021) Mary and the Ladder digital (Superpang)
- (2021) Music from Organ LP, digital (npm-label)
- (2018) Crystalline Tragedies / The Procession (Distant Motionless Shores) split with Martijn Comes LP, digital (Moving Furniture Records)
- (2016) Confini / Fiaccole digital (Sonospace)
- (2016) Mutus Liber split with Moon Ra cassette, digital (No Problema Tapes)
- (2015) Yellow Horse CD, digital (Manyfeetunder / Concrete)
- (2013) Archipelago cassette, digital (Other Electricities)
- (2011) Boule à Neige digital (Laverna Net Label)

=== Various Projects ===
- (2013) AIPS collective - Postcards From Italy CD, digital (Oak editions)
- (2012) Viandanti (Nostalghia paths, homage to Andrei Tarkovsky) digital (radio show for Radia network - Radio Papesse)

=== Obsil project albums ===
- (2006) Obsil - Points CD, digital (Disasters by Choice Records)
- (2009) Obsil - Distances CD, digital (Disasters by Choice Records)
- (2011) Obsil - Vicino CD, digital (Psychonavigation Records)

== See also ==
- List of ambient music artists
