= John Tejada =

Austrian-born American electronic music producer and composer

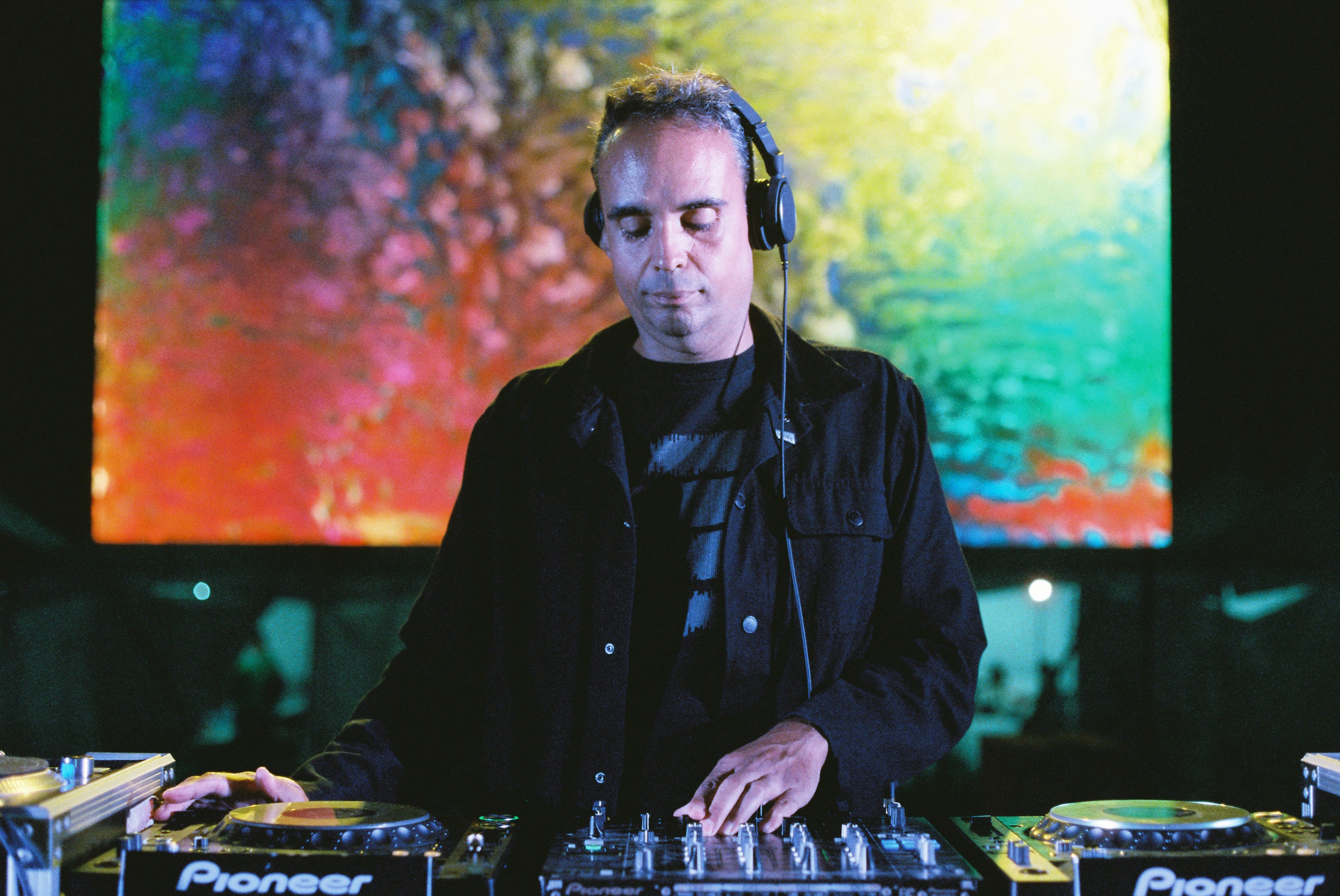
Photography by Braulio Lam

John Tejada (born 21 April 1974) is an Austrian-born American electronic music producer and composer. Tejada's output of music began in 1994, including four albums for Kompakt, plus releases on Pokerflat, Cocoon, Plug Research, Seventh City, Playhouse, Defected, and his own label of 22 years, Palette Recordings.

== Early life ==
Tejada was born on 21 April 1974 in Vienna, Austria, and moved to Los Angeles, United States, in 1982 with his parents, both classically trained professional musicians. After learning the piano at the age of four and drums at the age of eight, Tejada was introduced to hip-hop music, and aged 12 received his first turntable and mixer. His first gig was that same year, when he began DJing the school dances. By 1991, he was already creating his own recordings, and in 1994 he released a single with Arian Leviste.

== Disc jockey career ==
Tejada began traveling internationally in 1997 to showcase his DJing skills around the globe. He has traveled to more than 25 countries and performed live at clubs and festivals around the world, including the Detroit Electronic Music Festival (aka Movement), Sónar (in Spain and Tokyo), Decibel Festival (Seattle), Dance Valley (Netherlands), Sync Festival (Greece), Mutek (Montreal and Mexico), as well as internationally known spaces such as Berghain (Berlin), Fabric (London), Yellow (Tokyo), Rex Club (Paris), Output (NYC), Dekmantel (Amsterdam), Guggenheim (Bilbao), The Dorothy Chandler Pavilion (Los Angeles), and twice at Walt Disney Concert Hall in Los Angeles.

== Collaborations ==
Tejada has also been responsible for remixing dozens of acts including The Postal Service, Télépopmusic, The Field, Bomb the Bass, Way Out West, Kevin Saunderson, Darren Emerson, Gui Boratto, and Simian Mobile Disco. Tejada's latest venture is as Wajatta (with international star Reggie Watts) with their debut album being released on May 11, 2018.

== Discography ==
=== Albums ===
- Little Green Lights and Four Inch Faders (1998) – A13
- The Matrix of Us (2000) – Defocus
- Daydreams In Cold Weather (2002) – Plug Research
- The Toiling of Idle Hands (2003) – Immigrant Records
- Logic Memory Center (2004) – Plug Research
- Cleaning Sound is a Filthy Business (2006) – Palette Recordings
- Where (2008) – Palette Recordings
- Parabolas (2011) – Kompakt
- The Predicting Machine (2012) – Kompakt
- Signs Under Test (2015) – Kompakt
- Dead Start Program (2018) – Kompakt
- Live Rytm Trax (2018) – Palette
- Year of the Living Dead (2021) – Kompakt
- Resound (2023) – Palette
- The Watchline (2025) – Palette

=== EPs ===
- Ebonics (1997) – Palette Recordings
- Genre (1998) – Palette Recordings
- Sonic Life (1998) – Ferox Records
- Song Forms & Freedom (2000) – Mosaic
- The Cover Up (2000) – 1200 Music
- Connection Remixes (2001) – Sheep Records
- Mating Rhythm (2001) – Mosaic
- The Toiling of Idle Hands (2004) – Immigrant
- Voyager (2005) – Palette Recordings
- Sweat (On the Walls) (2004) – Poker Flat Recordings
- Not That, But This (2011) – Trapez
- Acid Test 10 (2016) – Absurd Recordings
- Therapy (2016) – Palette Recordings
- Acid Test 12 (2017) – Absurd Recordings

=== Compilation albums ===
- Fabric 44 – John Tejada (2009) – Fabric (London)
- The 7th City Years (2012) – Palette Recordings

=== Collaborative albums ===
==== Wajatta ====
- Casual High Technology (2018) – Comedy Dynamics
- Don't Let Get You Down (2020) – Brainfeeder
