= City Centre Offices =

British record label

- Founded: 1998
- Founder: Shlom Sviri, Thaddeus Herrmann
- Status: Active
- Country of origin: UK

City Centre Offices is a record label based in Manchester, England, with an affiliate in Berlin, Germany. The label, founded in 1998 by Shlom Sviri and De:Bug magazine writer Thaddeus Herrmann, has released music from several notable acts, including Arovane, Boy Robot, Marsen Jules, Christian Kleine, Casino Versus Japan, Ulrich Schnauss, The Gentleman Losers and I'm Not a Gun.

== See also ==
- List of record labels
