= Blue Skied an' Clear =

Blue Skied An' Clear

Studio album by Various Artists on Morr Music
- Released: 2002
- Genre: Indietronica
- Length: 132:13
- Label: Morr

Professional ratings
Review scores
Source	Rating
AllMusic	3/5 stars
Pitchfork	7.3/10
Stylus	B

Blue Skied an' Clear is a two-disc compilation, featuring various artists from Morr Music covering songs from the shoegazer band Slowdive on the first disc and composing songs "inspired" by Slowdive on the second disc. It was released in 2002 by Morr Music, and was the label's 30th release. In addition to serving as a showcase of the Morr Music roster, this release serves as a testament to the resurgence or revival of the shoegazing sound in this particular realm of electronica or IDM.

Whereas the initial wave of shoegazer rock had fuzzed out guitars (via distortion from effects pedals) as a central characteristic, the artists on this release combine that with (or abandon it for) glitchy beats, synth tones, and digital signal processing effects. On this release, and with this indietronica style of music in general, musicians composing with software housed in laptop computers often replace the conventional rock band formula. Being composed of Slowdive covers, the first disc has substantially more vocals than the second disc, which is more in line with the modus operandi of electronica or indietronica artists, generally speaking.

The title of this compilation is taken from a track on Slowdive's third album, Pygmalion. This track was covered by Manual.

== Track listing ==
=== Disc 1 (Slowdive covers) ===
1. Future 3 — "Alison" – 3:11
2. ISAN — "Waves" – 6:54
3. Lali Puna — "40 Days" – 3:51
4. Ulrich Schnauss — "Crazy For You" – 6:31
5. B. Fleischmann & Ms. John Soda — "Here She Comes" – 4:24
6. Limp — "Souvlaki Space Station" – 5:18
7. Solvent — "When The Sun Hits" – 3:59
8. Styrofoam — "Altogether" – 3:57
9. Skanfrom — "Here She Comes" – 2:29
10. ISAN — "Celia's Dream" – 4:42
11. Komëit — "When The Sun Hits" – 3:04
12. Manual — "Blue Skied An' Clear" – 5:32
13. Herrmann & Kleine — "Dagger" – 4:43
14. Múm — "Machine Gun" – 3:50

=== Disc two ===
1. Manual — "Summer Haze" – 5:11
2. ISAN — "My Last Journey (Weather Balloon)" – 5:56
3. Guitar — "House Full Of Time" – 4:46
4. Ulrich Schnauss — "Wherever You Are" – 6:38
5. Styrofoam — "Fade Out Your Eyes" – 5:25
6. Populous — "Clijster" – 4:22
7. Future 3 — "Stuff" – 3:50
8. Solvent — "Discontinued Parts (Instrumental Mix)" – 4:02
9. Herrmann & Kleine — "Leaving You Behind (Without Knowing Where To Go) – 6:32
10. B. Fleischmann — "Take A Day Off" – 5:56
11. Icebreaker International & Manual — "Into Forever" – 5:06
12. Komëit — "Same, Same" – 4:03
13. Ms. John Soda — "Solid Ground" – 3:27
14. Limp — "Silent Running" – 4:34

== Personnel ==
- Markus Acher – Producer
- Micha Acher – Interpretation
- Judith Beck – Vocals
- Stefanie Böhm – Interpretation
- Digital Jockey – Producer, Mixing, Vocal Programming
- Bernhard Fleischmann – Producer, Interpretation
- Thaddi Herrmann – Producer
- isan – Producer
- Günther Janssen – Programming, Engineer
- Regina Janssen – Vocals
- Christian Kleine – Producer
- Thomas Knak – Producer
- Jan Kruse – Cover Design
- Maja Maria – Vocals
- Jonas Munk – Producer
- Anders Remmer – Producer
- Ulrich Schnauss – Arranger, Producer
- Jesper Skaaning – Producer
- Skanfrom – Arranger
- Solvent – Producer, Interpretation
- Mario Thaler – Producer
- Valerie Trebeljahr – Producer
