= Enemies of Happiness =

- Directed by: Eva Mulvad
- Produced by: Helle Faber
- Starring: Mardina Parmach (Interpreter)
- Cinematography: Zillah Bowes
- Edited by: Adam Nielsen
- Music by: Thomas Knak; Jesper Skaaning; Anders Remmer
- Production company: Bastard Film
- Distributed by: Women Make Movies; The Danish Film Institute
- Release date: November 10, 2006
- Running time: 58 minutes
- Country: Denmark
- Language: English

Enemies of Happiness (Danish: Vores lykkes fjender) is a 2006 documentary about the controversial Afghan politician and member of the Afghan Parliament Malalai Joya filmed by Danish director Eva Mulvad.

The film team travelled with the then 28 years old Malalai Joya during her campaign for the 2005 Afghan parliamentary election, which was the first democratic election in 30 years in Afghanistan. The film gives deep insight into the living conditions of the Afghan population.

== Awards ==
- 2006, Silver Wolf Award, IDFA, Amsterdam
- 2007, World Cinema Jury Prize: Documentary, Sundance Film Festival
- 2007, Special Jury Mention, Silverdocs 2007
- 2007, Best long documentary, Festival Films De Femmes, High School Jury, Creteil
- 2007, International Premier Award, One World Media Awards, London
- 2007, Nestor Almendros Prize, Human Rights Watch Film Festival, New York
- 2007, Special Mention, One World Film Festival
- 2007, Audience Mention Best Documentary, 15 Mostra Internacional de film de dones, Barcelona

Awards
Preceded by In the Pit	Sundance Grand Jury Prize: World Cinema Documentary; 2007	Succeeded by Man on Wire
