= Isares =

Isares may refer to:

- Isares (EP), a 2014 EP by Manual
- Macrobrochis or Isares, a genus of moth

== See also ==
- Rama Isares, Thai prince whose daughter was the namesake of Ram Buttri Road
