= Skaaning =

Skaaning is a surname. Notable people with the surname include:

- Daniel Skaaning (born 1993), Danish freestyle swimmer
- Jesper Skaaning, Danish electronic musician, producer and film composer
