= Accordion Noir =

Radio show

Accordion Noir is the name of a weekly radio show originating from Vancouver, Canada, and an annual music festival there associated with the show.

Bruce Triggs and Rowan Lipkovits started Accordion Noir in December 2006 as an accordion-themed radio show on Vancouver community radio station CFRO-FM. The festival began in 2007, and takes place in several Vancouver venues each year.

== Past performers ==
- Geoff Berner, who was an inspiration for starting the festival, and who has launched albums and books there
- The Creaking Planks
- Fang
- Antii Paalanen
- Iva Nova
- Patrick Farrell and Ben Holmes
- Renée De la Prade
- Orkestar Slivovica
- Demon Squadron
- Miss Murgatroid
- Nefertiti in the Kitchen
- Jason Webley
- Wendy McNeill
