= Panophonic =

Solo project by Tom Lugo

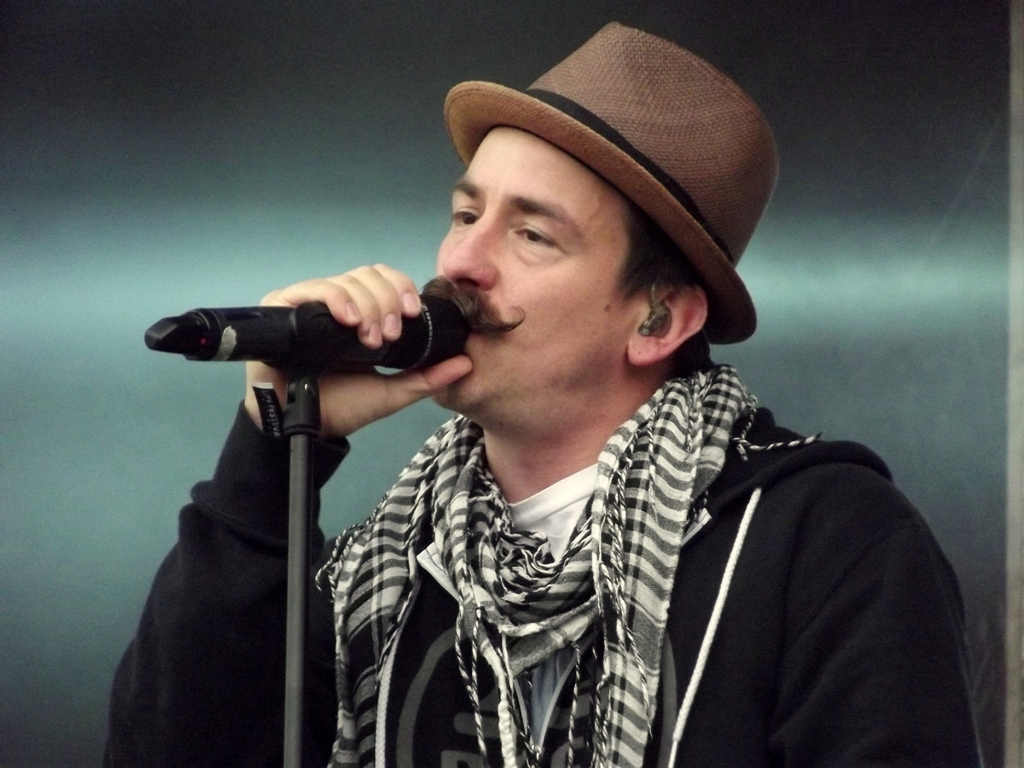
- Tom Lugo

Background information
- Origin: Philadelphia, Pennsylvania, United States
- Genres: Psychedelic rock Space rock Shoegaze
- Years active: 2002–present
- Label: Patetico Recordings
- Members: Tom Lugo
- Website: http://www.last.fm/music/panophonic

Panophonic is a solo project by Tom Lugo, the front man of the band Stellarscope. The music incorporates lo-fi electro dreampop and shoegaze.

Panophonic has appeared on tribute albums, including Jesusland (a tribute to the Jesus and Mary Chain) and Blue Skied an' Clear (a tribute to Slowdive). It has been featured on the television channels MTV, SyFy, A&E and Discovery.

== Discography ==
=== Studio albums, Demos, EPs ===
- untouched in ages EP- 2008 Patetico Recordings
- one full manic episode- 2007 Patetico Recordings
- alumbra- 2007 Patetico Recordings
- claroscuro- 2006 Patetico Recordings
- despues de la tormenta electrica-2006 Patetico Recordings
- todo es azul: lo mejor de mi- 2006 Patetico Recordings
- viaje celestial- 2005 Patetico Recordings
- ciudad area- 2005 Patetico Recordings
- cronicas del silencio- 2004 Patetico Recordings
- omni-directional- 2003 Patetico Recordings
- fear of noise & other shrieking sounds-2002 Patetico Recordings

=== Compilations and tributes ===
- Blue Skyed & Clear for Slowdive Tribute Compilation - So Soft Records (Spain)
- Jesusland: A tribute to the Jesus & Mary Chain - Fuga Discos (Argentina)
- Supple Selections V.2 - Supple Records (USA)
