= Malalai Joya =

Afghan activist, writer and former politician

- ملالی جویا
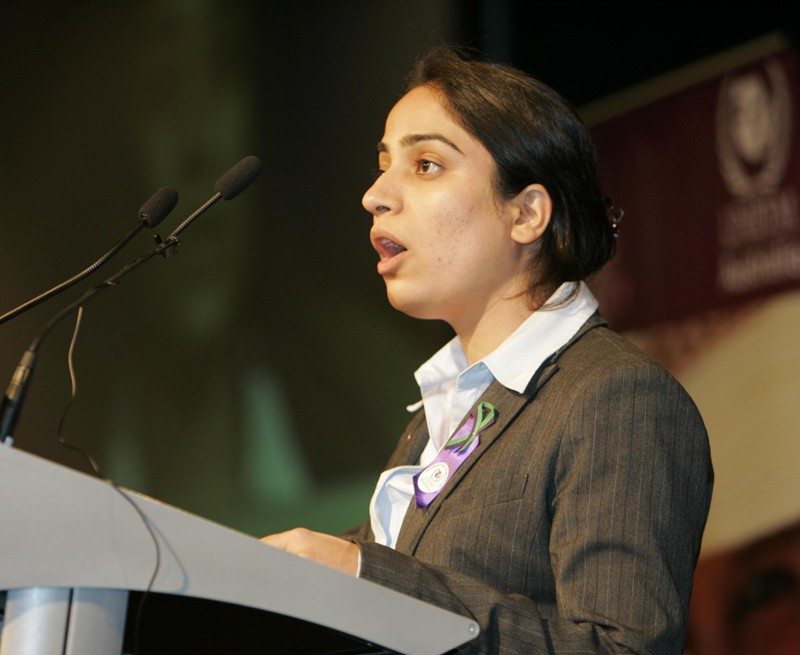
- Joya speaking in Australia, March 2007

Member of the House of the People of Afghanistan
- Incumbent
- Assumed office 1 December 2003
- Constituency: Farah Province

Personal details
- Born: 25 April 1978 (age 48) Farah Province, Republic of Afghanistan
- Occupation: Former politician and author.
- Known for: Criticism of the Afghan government and the presence of US-NATO forces in Afghanistan.

Malalai Joya (Pashto: ملالۍ جویا) (born 25 April 1978) is an activist, writer, and a politician from Afghanistan. She served as a Parliamentarian in the National Assembly of Afghanistan from 2005 until early 2007, after being dismissed for publicly denouncing the presence of warlords and war criminals in the Afghan Parliament. She was an outspoken critic of the Karzai administration and its western supporters, particularly the United States.

Her suspension in May 2007 generated protests internationally and appeals for her reinstatement were signed by high-profile writers, intellectuals such as Noam Chomsky, and politicians including members of parliament from Canada, Germany, the United Kingdom, Italy, and Spain. She was called "the bravest woman in Afghanistan" by the BBC.

In 2010, Time magazine placed Malalai Joya on their annual list of the 100 most influential people in the world. Foreign Policy Magazine listed Malalai Joya in its annual list of the Top 100 Global Thinkers. On 8 March 2011, The Guardian listed her among "Top 100 women: activists and campaigners". In 2021, Joya was forced under threat from the Taliban regime to leave Afghanistan and live in exile.

== Early and personal life ==
Joya was born on 25 April 1978, in the Farah Province, in western Afghanistan. Her father was a former medical student who lost a leg while fighting in the Soviet–Afghan War. In 1982, when she was 4 years old, her family fled Afghanistan to live as refugees in neighboring Iran. She got involved in humanitarian work while in eighth grade:

"I started working as an activist when I was very young, grade 8. When I started working amongst our people, especially women, it was so enjoyable for me. I learned a lot from them, even though they were not educated. Before I started, I want to tell you, I didn't know anything about politics. I learned from people who were non-educated, non-political people who belonged to a political situation. I worked with different committees in the refugee camps. I remember that in every house that I went everyone had different stories of suffering. I remember one family we met. Their baby was just skin and bones. They could not afford to take the baby to a doctor, so they had to just wait for their baby to die. I believe that no movie maker, no writer is able to write about these tragedies that we have suffered. Not only in Afghanistan, but also Palestine, Iraq…The children of Afghanistan are like the children of Palestine. They fight against enemies with only stones. These kinds of children are my heroes and my heroines."

— Malalai Joya, 5 November 2007

Joya returned to Afghanistan in 1998, during the Taliban's reign. As a young woman she worked as a social activist and was named a director of a non-governmental group, in the western provinces of Herat and Farah. She is married, but has not revealed the name of her husband due to fear for his safety.

== Speech at the 2003 loya jirga ==
Malalai Joya gained international attention when, as an elected delegate to the Loya Jirga convened to ratify the Constitution of Afghanistan, she spoke out publicly against the domination of warlords on 17 December 2003. She said:

My name is Malalai Joya from Farah Province. By the permission of the esteemed attendees, and by the name of God and the colored-shroud martyrs of the path of freedom, I would like to speak for a couple of minutes.

My criticism on all my compatriots is that why are they allowing the legitimacy and legality of this Loya Jerga come under question with the presence of those felons who brought our country to this state.

I feel pity and I feel very sorry that those who call Loya Jirga an infidel—basically equivalent to blasphemy. After coming here their words are accepted, or please see the committees and what people are whispering about. The chairman of every committee is already selected. Why do you not take all these criminals to one committee so that we see what they want for this nation? These were those who turned our country into the nucleus of national and international wars. They were the most anti-women people in the society who wanted to [pause] who brought our country to this state and they intend to do the same again. I believe that it is a mistake to test those already being tested. They should be taken to national and international court. If they are forgiven by our people, the bare-footed Afghan people, our history will never forgive them. They are all recorded in the history of our country.

Some delegates applauded her speech, but others turned to shock and dissatisfaction, including the chief of the Loya Jirga, Sibghatullah Mojaddedi who called her "infidel" and "communist", and ordered her out of the assembly. Some delegates were heard shouting death threats. After some representatives intervened her expulsion, Joya returned to the assembly, but refused to apologize after being asked by Mojadeddi.

World Pulse (issue 1, 2005) wrote:

When her time came to make her 3-minute statement, she tugged her black headscarf over her hair, stepped up to the microphone, and with emotional electricity made the speech that would alter her life.

After she spoke, there was a moment of stunned silence. Then there was an uproar. Male mujahideen, some who literally had guns at their feet, rushed towards her, shouting. She was brought under the protection of UN security forces.

In a nation where few dare to say the word "warlord" aloud, Joya had spoken fiercely against a proposal to appoint high clergy members and fundamentalist leaders to guide planning groups. She objected that several of those religious leaders were war criminals who should be tried for their actions—not national heroes to influence the new government.

Despite the commands of Assembly chairman, Joya refused to apologize.

== Political appointments and speaking engagements ==
Joya ran in the 2005 Afghan parliamentary election. She was elected to the 249-seat National Assembly, or Wolesi Jirga in September 2005, as a representative of Farah Province, winning the second highest number of votes in the province, with 7.3 percent of the vote. She was the youngest member of the Afghan Parliament elected in the 2005 elections.

At an impromptu news conference after the swearing-in ceremony in December 2005, Joya offered her "condolences" to the people of Afghanistan "for the presence of warlords, drug lords and criminals" in the Parliament. "The people of Afghanistan have recently escaped the Taliban cage but still they are trapped in the cage of those who are called warlords" Joya continued her stance against the inclusion of alleged war criminals in the Islamic Republic government of Afghanistan.

The BBC has called Joya "the most famous woman in Afghanistan." In a 27 January 2007 interview with BBC News, which was reported internationally, Joya commented on her personal political mission amid continuous death threats, saying:

"I received floods of insults: whore, crazy, unfaithful, communist... A deluge of threats: rape, kidnapping, assassination... A bomb exploded in the crowd waiting for me one day at a meeting; My offices were spied on and my teams tried to trap them. I have already survived four murder attempts. My determination will not waver. My life, of course, is complicated. I change roofs every night. And during the day, I only travel around Kabul by taxi, camouflaged under the burqa. It's difficult for my family, for my husband. But I have the support of the people. Unwavering and ardent. They will kill me but they will not kill my voice, because it will be the voice of all Afghan women. You can cut the flower, but you cannot stop the coming of spring."

In 2006, American daily newspaper The Washington Post said of Joya: "Her truth is that warlords should not be permitted to hide behind 'the mask of democracy to hold on to their chairs' and their pernicious pursuits at the expense of poor, 'barefoot' Afghans who remain voiceless and disillusioned. The warlords are corrupt 'war criminals' who should be tried, and incorrigible 'drug dealers' who brought the country to its knees, she said."

Joya appeared at the Federal Convention of Canada's New Democratic Party (NDP) in Quebec City, Quebec, on 10 September 2006, supporting party leader Jack Layton and the NDP's criticism of the NATO-led mission in southern Afghanistan. She said, "No nation can donate liberation to another nation."

On 13 September that year she addressed gatherings at McGill University in Montreal and at the University of Ottawa, where she expressed her disappointment with US actions in Afghanistan.

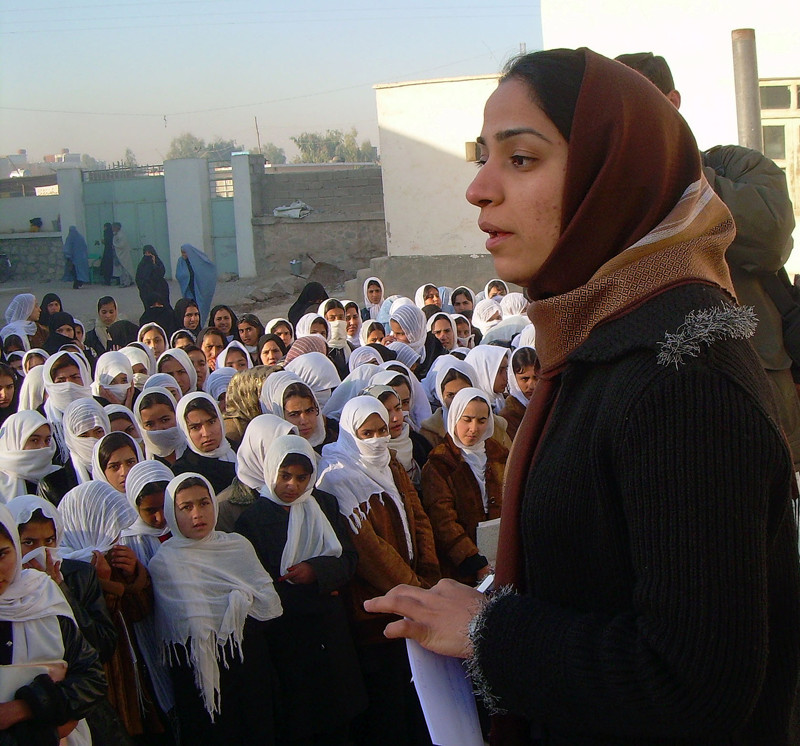
19 February 2007 – Joya addresses students in a girls' school in Farah, Afghanistan

After her speech, Prof. Denis Rancourt of the University of Ottawa, wrote in an article about Joya: "Her talk was a sharp blade cutting thru the thick web of US-Canada war propaganda... All MPs need to take a lesson from Malalai Joya.",

Joya visited Sydney, New South Wales, Australia, on 8 March 2007, as a guest of the United Nations Development Fund for Women (UNIFEM), and spoke about women's rights in Afghanistan in honor of International Women's Day.

Joya returned to Canada in November 2007 and addressed 400 people at the Steelworkers Hall in Toronto. She then addressed a small group of union activists and activists at the Ontario Federation of Labour.

In November 2008, Joya visited the Norway Social Forum, and spoke before the 1900 participants. She also participated in a debate with then Norwegian Foreign Minister, Jonas Gahr Støre, and asked Norway to pull its troops out of Afghanistan.

In December 2008, Joya was invited by Amnesty International India to New Delhi for the International Week of Justice Festival, 5–10 December 2008, commemorating the 60th anniversary of the Universal Declaration of Human Rights (UDHR). Joya participated in two public forums for the festival at Jamia Millia Islamia university and at Alliance Francaise on the issues related to post-war Afghanistan, female empowerment and torture.

In October–November 2009 Joya undertook a book tour to the United States and Canada and addressed anti-war rallies and gatherings. She called for withdrawal of all troops from Afghanistan.

When then President of the United States, Barack Obama, was awarded the 2009 Nobel Peace Prize, Noam Chomsky wrote in an article syndicated by The New York Times: "The Nobel Peace Prize committee might well have made truly worthy choices, prominent among them the remarkable Afghan activist Malalai Joya."

On 24 November 2009, British political and cultural magazine New Statesman ranked Joya in the sixth place on its list of "The 50 people who matter today... for good and ill", calling her "Afghanistan's answer to Aung San Suu Kyi."

Because she was "unemployed" and "lives underground", the United States denied Joya a travel visa in March 2011, which sparked a public campaign by her supporters to pressure the US government. She was scheduled to speak at several different places in the United States, including Pace University in Manhattan, New York City, and St. Mary's College of Maryland. Joya stated that "[the Afghan government] has probably requested the U.S. to not let me enter ... because I am exposing the wrong policies of the U.S. and its puppet regime at the international level." However, the United States Department of State later explained that a visa has been issued to Joya. Joya started her US speaking tour on 25 March 2011 from Boston, Massachusetts, where, along with Professor Noam Chomsky, she gave a presentation on the Afghan war to 1200 people at Memorial Church of Harvard University. Joya said that:

"We want the end of this brutal war, this occupation, as soon as possible. During these ten years, tens of thousands of civilians have been killed, most of them innocent women, children and men."

== Parliament statements, attack and suspension ==
On 7 May 2006, Joya was physically and verbally attacked by fellow members of parliament after accusing several colleagues of being "warlords" and unfit for service in the new Afghan government. "I said there are two kinds of mujahedeen in Afghanistan," Joya told the Associated Press. "One kind fought for independence, which I respect, but the other kind destroyed the country and killed 60,000 people." In response, angered lawmakers shouted death threats and threw empty plastic water bottles at Joya, who was shielded by sympathetic colleagues.

In response to such threats, Joya continues to speak out against those she believes to be former mujahedeen (an Arabic term for people engaged in jihad) in Afghanistan, stating:

"Never again will I whisper in the shadows of intimidation. I am but a symbol of my people's struggle and a servant to their cause. And if I were to be killed for what I believe in, then let my blood be the beacon for emancipation and my words a revolutionary paradigm for generations to come."

On 21 May 2007, fellow members of the Wolesi Jirga voted to suspend Joya for three years from the legislature, citing that she had broken Article 70 of the Parliament, which had banned Wolesi Jirga members from openly criticizing each other. Joya had compared the Wolesi Jirga to a "stable or zoo" on a television interview for TOLO, and later called other members of parliament "criminals" and "drug smugglers." She is reported to have referred to the House as "worse than a stable", since "(a) stable is better, for there you have a donkey that carries a load and a cow that provides the milk."

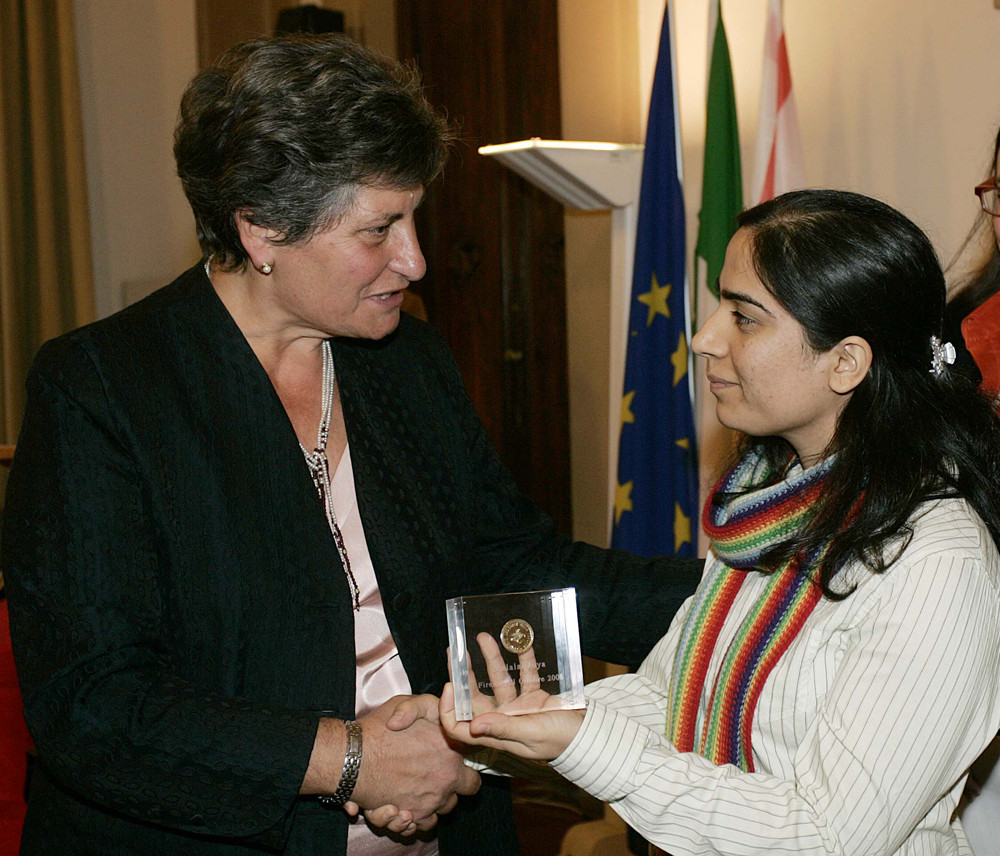
21 October 2008 – Florence: Regional Councillor Bruna Giovannini, on behalf of the Regional Council of Tuscany gives Malalai Joya a prestigious gold medal

Joya said the vote was a "political conspiracy" and that she had been told Article 70 was written specifically for her saying "since I've started my struggle for human rights in Afghanistan, for women's rights, these criminals, these drug smugglers, they've stood against me from the first time I raised my voice at the Loya Jirga."

In a statement made by Brad Adams, Asia director at Human Rights Watch, wrote: "Malalai Joya is a staunch defender of human rights and a powerful voice for Afghan women, and she shouldn't have been suspended from parliament."

People in Farah, Nangarhar, Baghlan, Kabul and some other provinces of Afghanistan staged protests against Joya's suspension.

On 21 June 2007, one month after Joya was suspended, Joya supporters in Melbourne staged protests to the Afghan government to reinstate Joya to the parliament. In November 2007, an international letter was launched with a number of prominent signatories supporting the call for her reinstatement to parliament.

In January 2008, after her suspension, Joya spoke to Rachel Shields and said that the government was not democratically elected and they were "trying to use the country's Islamic law as a tool with which to limit women's rights."

On 18 April 2008, the Governing Council of the Inter-Parliamentary Union, unanimously adopted a resolution at its 182nd session in Cape Town in favour of Malalai Joya which "Calls on the authorities at the same time to do everything in their power to identify and bring to justice those making the death threats against Ms. Joya."

On 7 October 2008, six women Nobel Peace Prize laureates (Shirin Ebadi, Jody Williams, Wangari Maathai, Rigoberta Menchú, Betty Williams and Mairead Maguire) in a joint statement supported Malalai Joya: "We commend this courage, and call for Joya's reinstatement to Afghanistan's national parliament… Like our sister Aung San Suu Kyi, Joya is a model for women everywhere seeking to make the world more just."

During her suspension, Joya stayed active by giving interviews to western journalists and by writing articles for western newspapers on her views on the situation of Afghanistan. In 2009, she made a tour through the United States and Canada to advocate her cause and to promote her book.

Shukria Barakzai, a fellow MP and women's rights activist, has also criticised the legislature in similar terms: "Our parliament is a collection of lords. Warlords, drug lords, crime lords." She defended Joya, reporting that some parliamentarians threatened to rape her.

In the mid-night of 10 March 2012, Joya's office in Farah City was stormed by some unknown armed men, in the gun-battle, two of her guards were seriously injured, but as Joya was in Kabul in the time of attack, she was safe.

== Announcement of political comeback ==
In February 2010, at the event of the presentation in Paris of "Au nom de mon peuple", the French publication of her memoir A Woman Among Warlords, Joya expressed her wish to make a political comeback in the Afghan parliamentary elections scheduled for September. Allegedly, supporters in five Afghan provinces asked her to represent them. These included Nangarhar, Nimroz, Takhar, Kabul and also Farah — the western province that sent her first to the loya jirga that ratified the Constitution, then elected her to Parliament in 2005. Preparing for her comeback, she said she would prefer for security reasons to run as a candidate in the capital. However, at the occasion of the marriage of one of her body guards in July 2010, she revoked her earlier announcement to participate in the parliamentary elections.

On 21 July 2012, Joya paid a visit to Heart and Farah in western Afghanistan where she was warmly welcomed by people.

On 21 March 2013, Joya addressed the Nowruz festival in Khewa district of Nengrahar province in South of Afghanistan. Around 5000 people gathered at this event to celebrate Afghanistan's New Year (1392).

On 24 March 2013, Joya joined the support network in defense of American activist and whistle-blower Chelsea Manning. She published a photo holding a sign which read "I am Bradley Manning!" She called her "great anti-war soldiers, who represent the shining face of America."

In 2016, Joya criticized peace talks which saw Afghan politician Gulbuddin Hekmatyar, a long-time Islamist insurgent leader, and his militants pardoned in return for them ending hostilities with the Afghan government. She claimed the agreement "signals more horror and bloodshed" and said that Gulbuddin was a "devious rascal".

In 2017, Joya stated that things had become worse for activists since the fall of the Taliban regime, claiming "Under the Taliban, we had only one enemy – now we have Taliban, warlords, Islamic State, occupation forces that keep dropping bombs, and the so-called technocrats, who have compromised in exchange for money and power."

== Islamic Emirate ==
After Fall of Kabul to the Taliban on 15 Aug 2021, Joya posted a video shot in burqa from inside a running car in the streets of Kabul on her Facebook page and said that she would continue her fight in Afghanistan.

In 2021, she was seen in Catalonia, Spain, where she and her family were given political asylum after her exile. In 2025, Joya attended a meeting at the European Parliament in Brussels, Belgium.

== Autobiography ==
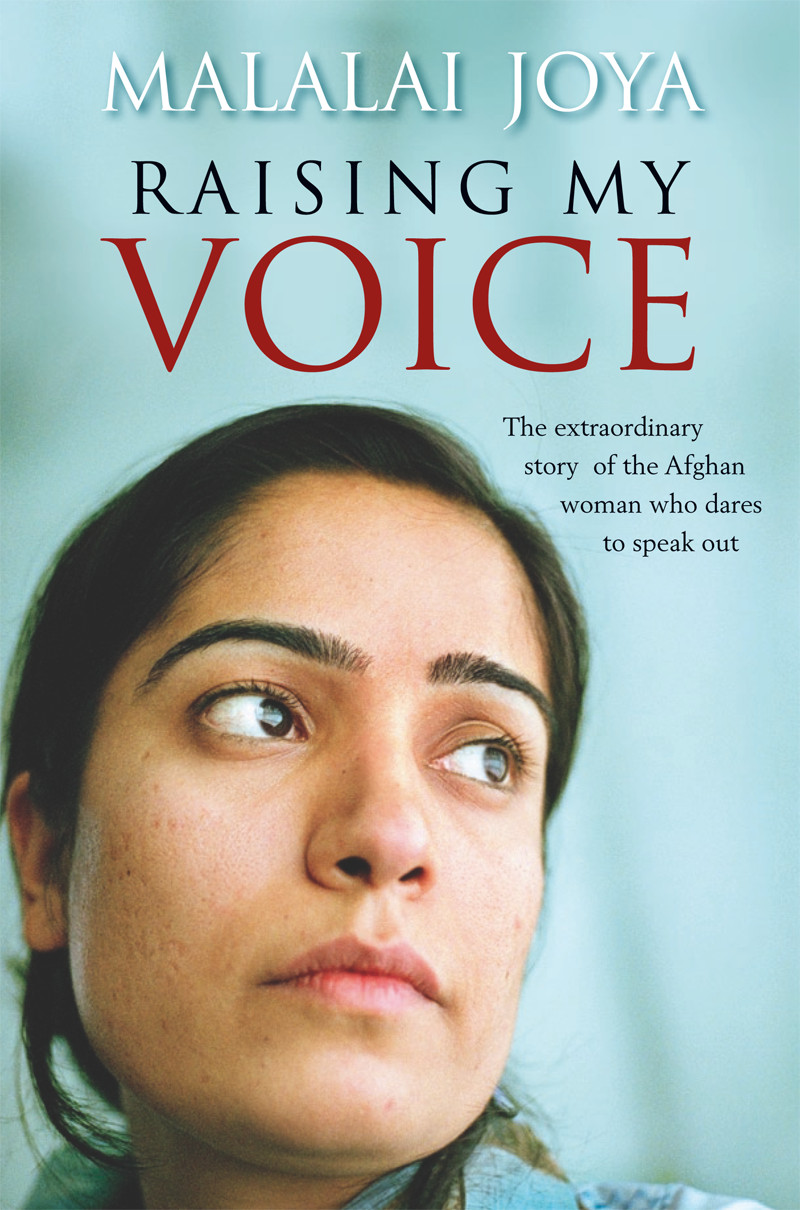
Title of Joya's autobiography "Raising My Voice", which was published in the US/Canada under the title of "A Woman Among Warlords"

Joya wrote a memoir with Canadian writer Derrick O'Keefe. The US and Canadian version of the book was published in October 2009 by Scribner under the title of A Woman Among Warlords: The Extraordinary Story of an Afghan Who Dared to Raise Her Voice in 224 pages. The Australian and British versions were published by Pan Macmillan and Rider under the title of Raising My Voice: The Extraordinary Story of an Afghan Who Dares to Speak Out. It has so far been published in German titled Ich erhebe meine Stimme – Eine Frau kämpft gegen den Krieg in Afghanistan, in Norwegian under the title Kvinne blant krigsherrer – Afghanistans modigste stemme and in Dutch under the title Een vrouw tussen krijgsheren and in Japanese under the title Together with Afghan People. The book will be available, in translation, in France (titled Au nom de mon peuple), Italy, Spain, the Netherlands, Denmark, Indonesia and Israel.

Kirkus Reviews wrote about Joya's book, calling it: "a chilling, vital memoir that reveals hidden truths about Afghanistan and directly addresses the misguided policies of the United States."

Library Journal wrote: "This book will interest those who seek stories of real-life heroines risking death every day for their nation."

Publishers Weekly wrote: "Joya was outspoken in condemning these warlords she called "criminals" and "antiwomen," enduring the shutting off of her microphone, assassination threats and, finally, suspension from Parliament. Joya is on a dangerous, eye-opening mission to uncover truth and expose the abuse of power in Afghanistan, and her book will work powerfully in her favor."

The New York Times Book Review wrote: "(...) bears witness to the horrific experience known as 'being female in Afghanistan'."

Noam Chomsky wrote: "Perhaps the most remarkable feature of this inspiring memoir is that despite the horrors she relates, Malalai Joya leaves us with hope that the tormented people of Afghanistan can take their fate into their own hands if they are released from the grip of foreign powers, and that they can reconstruct a decent society from the wreckage left by decades of intervention and the merciless rule of the Taliban and the warlords who the invaders have imposed upon them."

In 2023, Joya's writing was analysed by Anisa Fathima for the International Journal of Interdisciplinary Studies in Humanities.

== Awards and honors ==
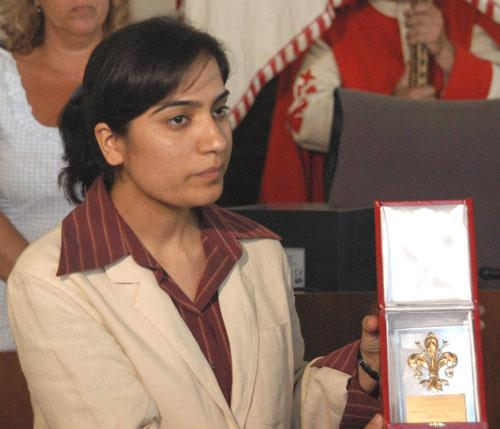
23 July 2007 – Florence, Italy: Malalai Joya, was awarded with the Golden Fleur-de-Lis (Giglio d'Oro) award

- January 2004, The Cultural Union of Afghans in Europe, awarded her the "Malalai of Maiwand" award for her brave speech in the Loya Jirga.
- December 2004, the Valle d'Aosta Province of Italy awarded her the International Women of the Year 2004 Award.
- 15 March 2006, Tom Bates, Mayor of Berkeley presented a certificate of honor to her for "her continued work on behalf of human rights".
- March 2006, she received the 2006 Gwangju Prize for Human Rights from the South Korean May 18th Foundation in South Korea (joint win with Thai politician and human rights activist Angkhana Neelaphaijit).
- August 2006, the Women's Peacepower Foundation awarded Joya "Women of Peace award 2006".
- She was named among the 2005 Nobel Peace Prize 1000 PeaceWomen Across the Globe (PWAG)
- The World Economic Forum selected Joya among 250 Young Global Leaders for 2007.
- 2007 Golden Fleur-de-Lis (Giglio d'Oro) award given by Town Council of Toscana Region of Italy (23 July 2007).
- 11 September 2007, The European Parliament named Joya among five nominees for Sakharov Prize for Freedom of Thought 2007.
- 6 October 2007, the Commune of Viareggio in Tuscany, Italy, awarded Joya the Mare Nostrum Award.
- 9 October 2007, the Commune of the Provincia di Arezzo, Comune di Bucine and Comune di Supino in Italy presented Honorary citizenship to Joya.
- November 2007, Joya was awarded the 14th Angel Award by The Angel Festival, California, USA.
- 11 February 2008, Joya and the Danish documentary Enemies of Happiness (2006) were honoured with the "International Human Rights Film Award" by Amnesty International, the Cinema for Peace Foundation and the Human Rights Film Network. The award was presented to her by American two times Academy Award-winning actress Hilary Swank.
- 6 October 2008, Joya received British human rights awarded, the Anna Politkovskaya Award, in London, England, which is given to "courageous women who have defended human rights."
- 21 October 2008, the Regional Council of Tuscany (Italy) presented Joya with a gold medal.
- 30 October 2008, Spanish organization the Spanish Committee for the Assistance to the Refugees (CEAR) announced Joya and Kurdish activist Leyla Zana as joint winners of the 2008 Juan Maria Bandres award for Human Rights and solidarity with refugees.
- 28 March 2009, the International Anti-discrimination Award 2009 by Dutch Unity is Strength Foundation, Rotterdam, The Netherlands, was awarded to Joya.
- 8 November 2009, United States Member of Congress Barbara Lee Honored Joya.
- 29 April 2010, named to the 2010 TIME 100, the magazine's annual list of the 100 most influential people in the world. although she reported being angry at how she was portrayed as in favor of the NATO and United States. occupation.
- 23 June 2010, Spanish newspaper El Mundo awarded the Yo Dona International award of "premio a la Labor Humanitaria" to Joya in Madrid, Spain.
- 27 September 2010, British political and cultural magazine New Statesman listed Joya in the list of "The World's 50 Most Influential Figures 2010".
- 10 October 2010, Italian Swiss University of Peace gave its International Award "Donna dell'Anno 2010" (woman of the year 2010) to Malalai Joya.
- 4 November 2010, as part of the Forbes "The World's Most Powerful People" package, American playwright, performer and activist Eve Ensler, founder of V-Day, named The World's Seven Most Powerful Feminists, with Joya was one of them.
- 28 November 2010, American news magazine Foreign Policy listed Joya in its annual list of the Top 100 Global Thinkers.
- 8 March 2011, British national daily newspaper The Guardian listed Joya among a list of "Top 100 women: activists and campaigners".
- 18 November 2021, at the Simply Woman International Awards Joya was recognised as a "Woman for Peace".

== Books ==
- Joya, Malalai (2009), Raising My Voice: The Extraordinary Story of the Afghan Woman Who Dares to Speak Out, London: Ebury Publishing, ISBN 9781407028729
- Joya, Malalai; O'Keefe, Derrick (2009), A Woman Among Warlords: The Extraordinary Story of an Afghan Who Dared to Raise Her Voice, New York: Scribner, ISBN 9781439132487

Joya's life and political activity have inspired an adventure novel by Thomas Pistoia published in Italy as La leggenda del Burqa.

== Films ==
- Malalai Joya (Samia's Wedding), August 2010, by Glyn Strong
- Malalai Joya champions rape victims, 2008, by Glyn Strong
- A Woman Among Warlords (2007). Directed by Eva Mulvad. Aired on the Wide Angle TV series in September 2007.
- Enemies of Happiness, 2006, directed by Eva Mulvad
- Afghanistan Unveiled 2004, by Nicolas Delloye, Aina Productions
