= Manual (musician) =

Electronic musician

Manual (or Jonas Munk) is the performing name of electronic musician Jonas Munk Jensen, (born 1981 or 1982), from Odense, Denmark. He makes music in the style of ambient psychedelic rock dream pop and indietronica. His sound tends to contain a mix of software synthesizers, guitars (sometimes sampled or heavily processed), and various digital signal processing effects. Mixing elements of IDM, glitch, and indie music, Manual is compared to artists ranging from IDM artists, such as Boards of Canada, as well as shoegazer groups like Blonde Redhead. Munk's output as Manual is strongly associated with the aesthetic of Morr Music, the label that released his first two albums. He also is featured on the Morr Music compilation Blue Skied an' Clear, which was a Slowdive tribute.

In 2004 he joined the American label Darla. Simultaneously, Munk started a psychedelic band called Causa Sui, and they released their self-titled debut album in December 2005.

He composed the soundtrack for the 2012 Danish-American road trip film Searching for Bill.

== Influences ==
In an interview with Pitchforkmedia, Munk mentions some of his sources of musical inspiration. They include: Talk Talk, Simple Minds, Japan, David Sylvian, Brian Eno, Cocteau Twins, U2, Philip Glass, Coil, Jimi Hendrix and Led Zeppelin.

== Discography ==
=== Albums ===
- Until Tomorrow (2001)
- Ascend (2002)
- Into Forever (2003) (collaboration with Icebreaker International)
- The North Shore (2004)
- Golden Sun (2004)
- Azure Vista (2005)
- Bajamar (2006)
- Lost Days, Open Skies and Streaming Tides (2007)
- Confluence (2008)
- Drowned In Light (2010)
- Epic (2010) (collaboration with Ulrich Schnauss)
- Ulrich Schnauss and Jonas Munk (2011) (collaboration with Ulrich Schnauss)
- Awash (2012)
- Pan (2013) (as Jonas Munk)

=== Singles ===
- Resort EP (2000)
- Dry Moods Warm Nights (2001)
- Isares (2003)

=== Compilations ===
- Blue Skied an' Clear (Morr Music's Slowdive tribute album) (2002)
