= Causa Sui =

Danish psychedelic rock band

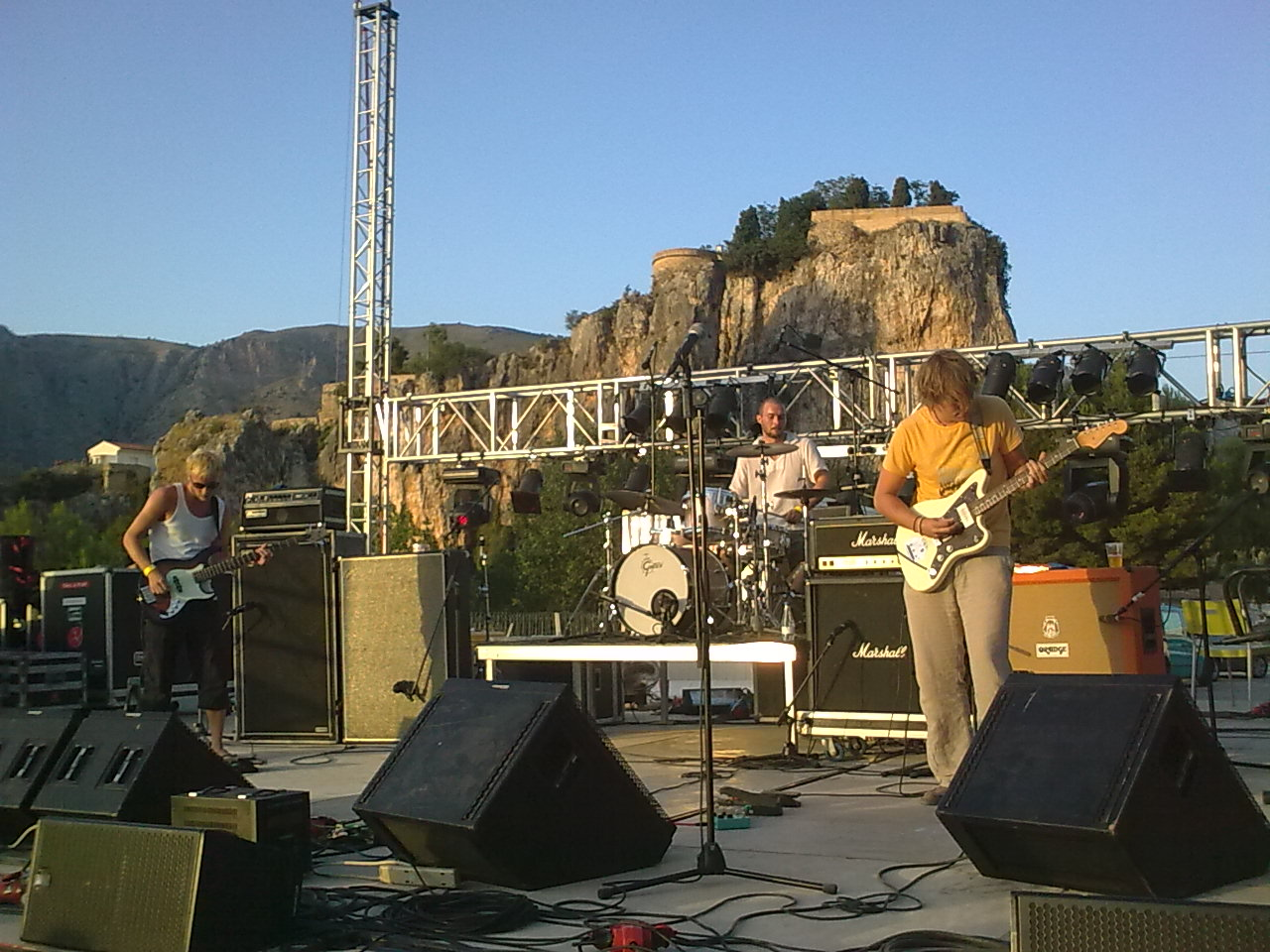
- Causa Sui at the Festival de Psicodelia Castell de Guadalest (2009)

Background information
- Origin: Denmark
- Genres: Psychedelic rock, stoner rock, Krautrock, improvisational rock, post-rock, jam band
- Years active: 2005-present
- Labels: El Paraiso Records
- Members: Jonas Munk; Jess Kahr; Jakob Skøtt; Rasmus Rasmussen
- Past members: Kasper Markus
- Website: elparaisorecords.com/artists/causa_sui

Causa Sui is a Danish instrumental psych-rock / stoner rock band composed of Jakob Skøtt, Jonas Munk, Rasmus Rasmussen and Jess Kahr. Beginning with their eponymous debut album, the band has released fourteen albums since 2005. Causa Sui's heavy sound is supplemented by abstract, instrumental and ambient styles akin to electric Miles Davis, or Can, particularly on their 'Sessions' series of albums, which feature guest musicians. Other cited influences include Popul Vuh, The Allman Brothers Band, Gabor Szabo, and Tame Impala. Despite rarely performing live, the band has released two live albums.

== Band members ==
- Jonas Munk - Guitars, Keyboards, Electronics, Vocals
- Jess Kahr - Bass
- Jakob Skøtt - Drums
- Rasmus Rasmussen - Keyboards, Electronics

== Discography ==
=== Studio albums ===
- Causa Sui (2005)
- Free Ride (2007)
- Euporie Tide (2013)
- Return To Sky (2016)
- Vibraciones Doradas (2017)
- Szabodelico (2020)
- From the Source (2024)
- In Flux (2025)

=== Live albums ===
- Live at Freak Valley (2014)
- Live in Copenhagen (2017) - feat. Johan Riedenlow (sax) and Nicklas Sørensen (papir-guitar)

=== Sessions albums ===
- Summer Sessions - Vol 1 (2008) - feat. Johan Riedenlow (sax)
- Summer Sessions - Vol 2 (2009) - feat. Johan Riedenlow (sax)
- Summer Sessions - Vol 3 (2009) - feat. Johan Riedenlow (sax)
- Pewt'r Sessions 1 (2011) - feat. Ron Schneiderman
- Pewt'r Sessions 2 (2011) - feat. Ron Schneiderman
- Pewt'r Sessions 3 (2014) - feat. Ron Schneiderman
