= Raising My Voice =

2009 book by Malalai Joya with Derrick O'Keefe

Raising My Voice: The Extraordinary Story of an Afghan Who Dared to Raise Her Voice
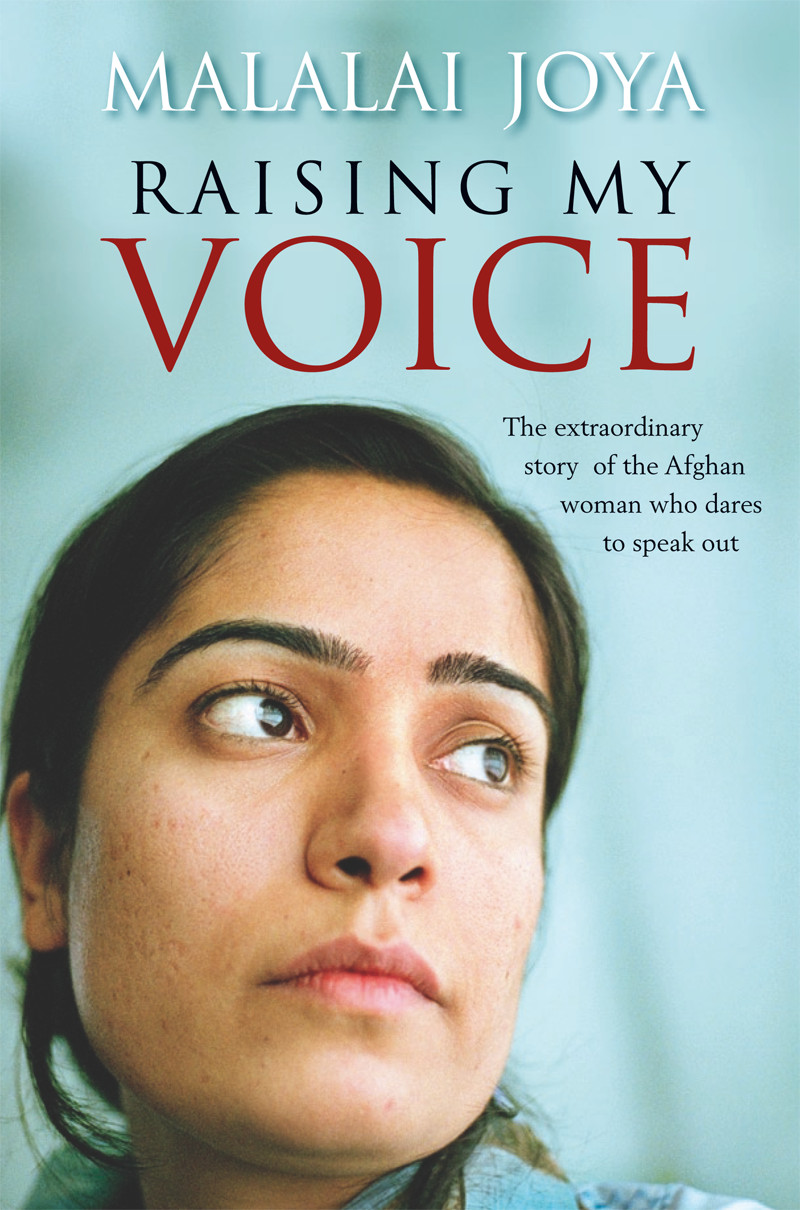
- Author: Malalai Joya
- Language: English, German, Norwegian, French, Dutch, Danish, Spanish, Romanian, Portuguese, Italian
- Subject: Politics
- Genre: Biography
- Publisher: Scribner/Simon & Schuster (USA and Canada), PIPER (Germany), Spartacus (Norway), Pan Macmillan (Australia), Rider (UK), Presses de la Cité (France), De Geus (The Netherlands), Piemme (Italy), VERA Books (Denmark), Kailas Books (Spain), All publishing house (Romania), Quidnovi (Portugal)
- Publication date: 2009
- Publication place: Afghanistan
- Media type: Hardcover, Paperback
- Pages: 229 (U.S. ed.)
- ISBN: 978-1-84604-149-5

Raising My Voice is a 2009 book by Malalai Joya with Derrick O'Keefe about the life of Malalai Joya the 'Bravest woman in Afghanistan' and suspended Member of Afghan Parliament.

== Publishing history ==
Joya has written her memoir with Canadian writer Derrick O'Keefe. The US and Canadian version of the book was published in October 2009 by Scribner under the title A Woman Among Warlords: The Extraordinary Story of an Afghan Who Dared to Raise Her Voice in 229 pages in the US edition. The Australian and British versions had already been published by Pan Macmillan and Rider under the title of Raising my Voice: The Extraordinary Story of an Afghan Who Dared to Raise Her Voice. The book has also been published in German (Ich erhebe meine Stimme) by PIPER, in Norwegian (Kvinne blant krigsherrer) by Spartacus, in French (Au nom de mon peuple) by Presses de la Cité, In the Netherlands ("Een vrouw tussen krijgsheren+) by De Geus, in Italy ("Finché avrò voce") by Piemme, in Denmark ("MIN LYKKES FJENDER") by VERA Books, in Spain ("Una mujer contra los señores de la guerra") by Kailas Books, in Romania ("IN NUMELE POPORULUI MEU") by All publishing house and in Portugal ("Jóia Afegã, Uma Mulher Entre os Senhores da guerra) by Quidnovi

== Reception ==
Kirkus Reviews write about Joya's book: "A chilling, vital memoir that reveals hidden truths about Afghanistan and directly addresses the misguided policies of the United States."

Library Journal writes: "This book will interest those who seek stories of real-life heroines risking death every day for their nation."

Publishers Weekly writes: "Joya was outspoken in condemning these warlords she called “criminals” and “antiwomen,” enduring the shutting off of her microphone, assassination threats and, finally, suspension from Parliament. Joya is on a dangerous, eye-opening mission to uncover truth and expose the abuse of power in Afghanistan, and her book will work powerfully in her favor."

Noam Chomsky writes: "Perhaps the most remarkable feature of this inspiring memoir is that despite the horrors she relates, Malalai Joya leaves us with hope that the tormented people of Afghanistan can take their fate into their own hands if they are released from the grip of foreign powers, and that they can reconstruct a decent society from the wreckage left by decades of intervention and the merciless rule of the Taliban and the warlords who the invaders have imposed upon them."

The Independent Weekly: "Raising My Voice is an inspiring story of courage and Malalai Joya’s struggle against oppressive regimes, given that attempts have been made on her life and more are imminent, and her public defiance of male politicians is most impressive. She makes the case very clearly that foreign aid is going to the tribal warlords and not the people who desperately need assistance."
