= April Records =

April Records is a Danish record label (based in Copenhagen, Denmark) specialized on Scandinavian electronica music: from ambient to techno and trip hop. List of musicians recorded on this label includes: Underworld, DJ 360°, Biosphere, Blue Foundation, Lindberg Hemmer Foundation, Thomas Knak a.k.a. Opiate, Jesper Skaaning a.k.a. Acoustic, Anders Remmer a.k.a. Jet, Future 3.

== Releases ==
Discography:

- A-1000-A1 Matt Covington Baby I'm For Real (12", Promo)
- APR 001 Boredom Is Deep And Mysterious (CD, Comp) 1994
- APR 002 Underworld Dark & Long (CD, EP) 1994
- APR 004 Double Muffled Dolphin My Left Side Is Out Of Sync (CD) 1994
- APR 010 Future 3 We Are The Future 3 (CD, Album) 1995
- APR 011 Double Muffled Dolphin The Lions Are Growing (CD) 1996
- APR 012 Acoustic No 1 (CD, Album) 1996
- APR 014 Future 3 The Boy From West Bronx (12") 1996
- APR 015 Bjørn Svin Mer Strøm #2 (12") 1997
- APR 016 Jet Jet #1 (12") 1997
- APR 018 Bjørn Svin Mer Strøm (CD) 1997
- APR 019 XJacks Double Xposure (CD, Album) 1997
- APR 020 Future 3 Stay With... (2xLP) 1998
- APR 021 Acoustic No 2 (12") 1997
- APR 022 Opiate 1/3 & 1/2 EP (12", EP) 1997
- APR 023 Boredom Is Deep And Mysterious 3 (CD) 1997
- APR 024 DJ 360° And Her Tears Dropped Like Beats (12") 1997
- APR 025 Jet Jet #2 (12") 1997
- APR 027 Magick A Lemon, Saab 96 And A Book (CD) 1997
- APR 030 DJ 360° 33 Revolutions Per Minute (CD) 1999
- APR 042 Future 3 Reverberate EP (12", EP) 2001
- APR 043 B9 Don't Worry It's B9 (CD) 1998
- APR 046 Time Of Madness Lust Fading (CD, Maxi) 1999
- APR 047 Time Of Madness Patterns (CD) 1999
- APR 048 Lindberg Hemmer Foundation Brazilian Architecture (LP, Album) 2001
- APR 048 Lindberg Hemmer Foundation Brazilian Architecture (CD, Album) 2001
- APR 049 Håkan Lidbo After The End (CD) 2000
- APR 050 Future 3 Like... (LP) 2001
- APR 051 Blue Foundation Wiseguy & Hollywood (CD, Maxi) 2000
- APR 054 Blue Foundation Blue Foundation (CD) 2001
- APR 055 DJ 360° Tag Along (Come On) (12") 2000
- APR 056 Biosphere Cirque (CD) 2000
- APR 057 Universal Funk One (2xLP) 2001
- APR 057 Universal Funk One (CD) 2001
- APR 059 Opiate While You Were Sleeping (CD, Album, Dig) 2002
- APR 062 Universal Funk Re:Done (CD) 2003
- APR 071 Alex Puddu And The Butterfly Collectors Chasing The Scorpion's Tail (CD) 2004

== See also ==
- List of record labels
