= Azure Vista =

Studio album by Manual
- Released: 3 May 2005
- Genre: Electronic
- Length: 47:54
- Label: Darla

Professional ratings
Review scores
Source	Rating
Allmusic	2/5 stars
Almost Cool	(7/10)
Prefix Magazine	4/5 stars
Stylus Magazine	B+

Azure Vista is an album by Manual. It was released by Darla on 3 May 2005.

== Track listing ==
1. "Clear Skies Above The Coastline Cathedral" – 8:38
2. "Summer Of Freedom" – 11:58
3. "Twilight" – 2:52
4. "Tourmaline" – 7:30
5. "Neon Reverie" – 8:27
6. "Azure Vista" – 8:23
