= Future 3 =

Danish ambient music group

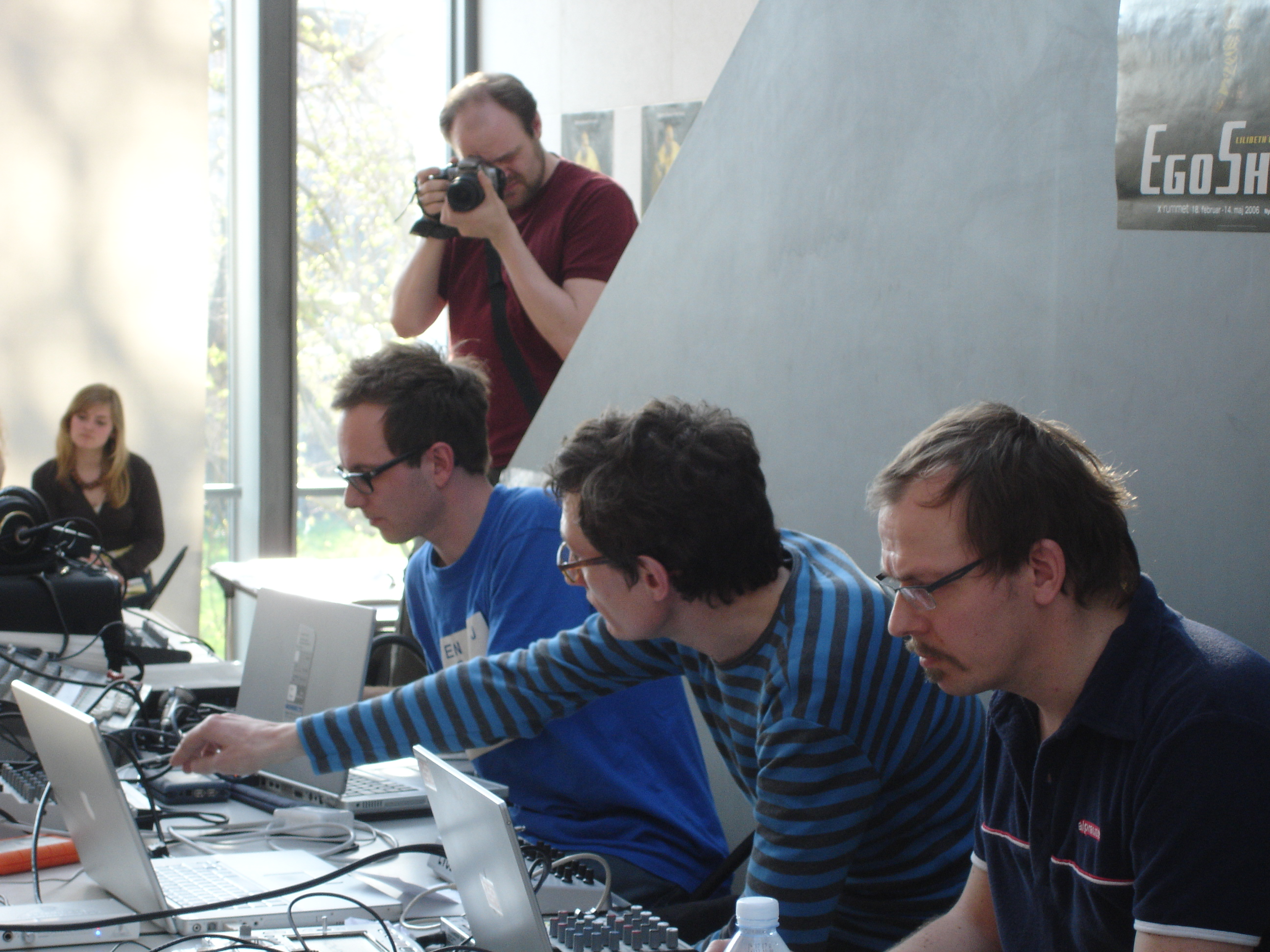

Background information
- Also known as: System, D.A.W.N.
- Origin: Denmark
- Genres: Ambient, Electronica
- Years active: 1994–present
- Labels: April Records, ~scape
- Members: Anders Remmer, Thomas Knak, Jesper Skaaning

Future 3 is a Danish ambient music trio, consisting of Anders Remmer, Thomas Knak and Jesper Skaaning. Their music is, like many other Scandinavian ambient artists such as Biosphere, characterized by a cold and bright sound. Except for their latest album, released in 2002 using the name 'System', all their records have been released by the Danish record label April Records.

All three members of Future 3, have released solo records under aliases such as Dub Tractor (Anders Remmer), Acustic (Jesper Skaaning) and Opiate (Thomas Knak). In 1998, the single The boy from West Bronx, received some attention from international media such as MTV.

== Discography ==
- We Are the Future 3 – (April Records, 1995)
- The boy from West Bronx EP – (April Records, 1998)
- Stay with... – (April Records, 1998)
- Reverberate EP – (April Records, 2001)
- Like... – (April Records, 2001)
- System (under System alias) – (~scape, 2002)
- Tempo EP (under System alias) – (Rump Recordings, 2007)
- With And Without – (Morr Music, 2014)
