= Eva Mulvad =

Danish documentary film director (born 1972)

- Born: Eva Mulvad Jørgense; 22 March 1972 (age 53); Denmark
- Awards: IDFA Silver Wolf Award; World Cinema Jury Prize at Sundance

Eva Mulvad (born 1972) is a Danish documentary film director. She graduated from the National Film School of Denmark in 2001. Eva is a director of documentaries for DR TV since 1997.

In 2006 she received IDFA Silver Wolf Award and World Cinema Jury Prize at Sundance for Enemies of Happiness. She also was a winner of the 2006 WIFT (Women in Film and TV) award for young film talents. In 2008 Malalai Joya and Eva received the International Human Rights Film Award at the Cinema for Peace Gala in Berlin.

== Filmography ==
- The Colony (Kolonien) (2006)
- Enemies of Happiness (Vores lykkes fjender) (2006)
- The Good Life (Det gode liv) (2010)
- A Modern Man (2017)

=== TV series ===
- Homo sapiens (1997)
- Når vi skilles (2003)
- Wide Angle (2007)
