= Isares (EP) =

EP by Manual
- Released: July 2003
- Genre: Electronic
- Length: 24:07
- Label: Static Caravan

Professional ratings
Review scores
Source	Rating
AllMusic	4/5 stars
Pitchfork	7.2/10

Isares is a single EP by Manual. It was released in July 2003 by Static Caravan.

== Track listing ==
1. "A Familiar Place" – 7:27
2. "Stealing Through" – 2:38
3. "Wake" – 5:22
4. "Horizon" – 8:36
