= Thomas Knak =

Danish electronic musician (born 1973)

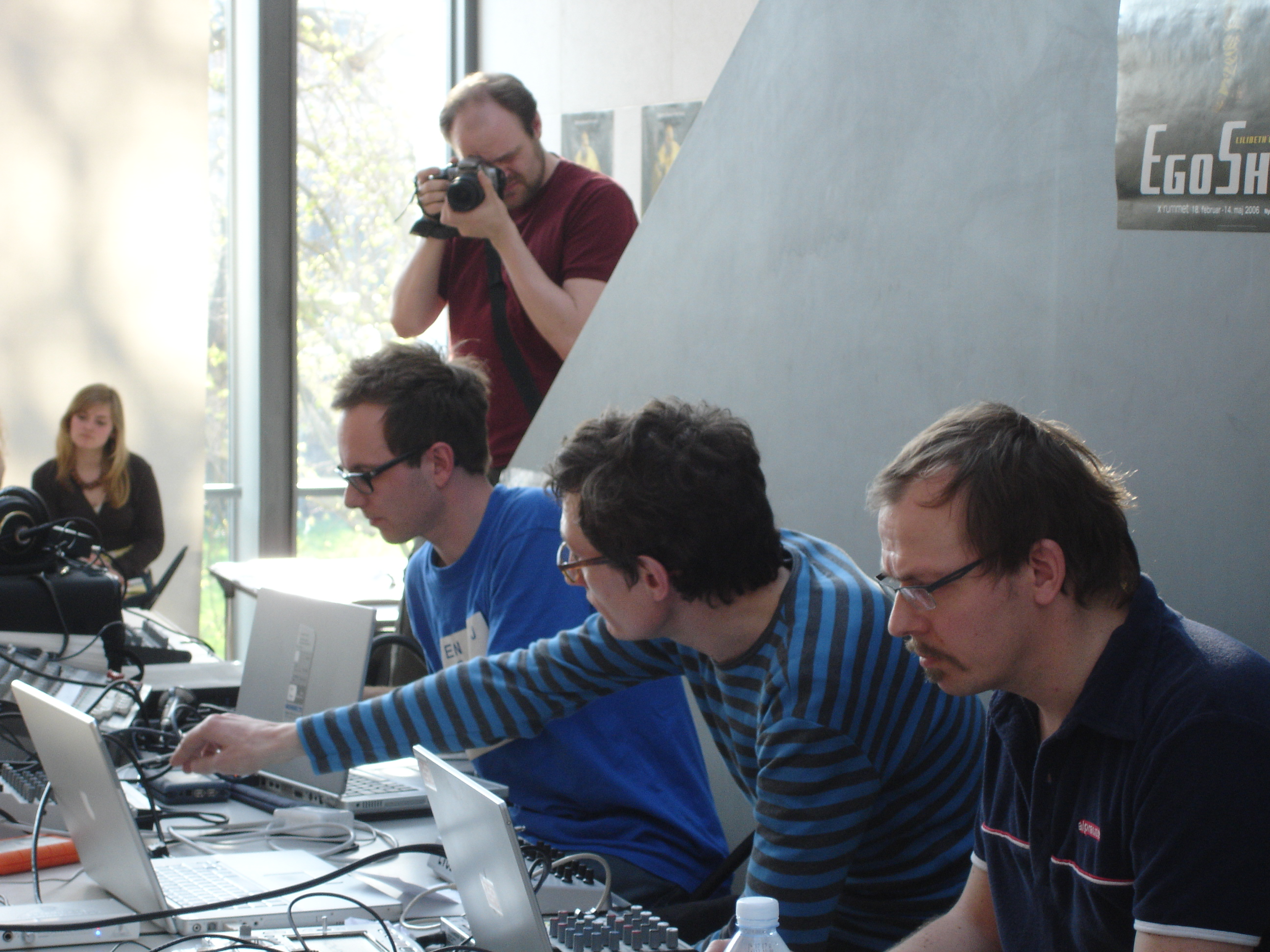
- System: Knak, Remmer, Skaaning, 2006

Background information
- Also known as: Opiate, DJ Opiate
- Born: 7 February 1973 (age 52)
- Origin: Copenhagen, Denmark
- Genres: Electronic music, ambient
- Occupations: electronic musician producer
- Years active: 1998 - present
- Labels: April Records; Hobby Industries; Morr Music

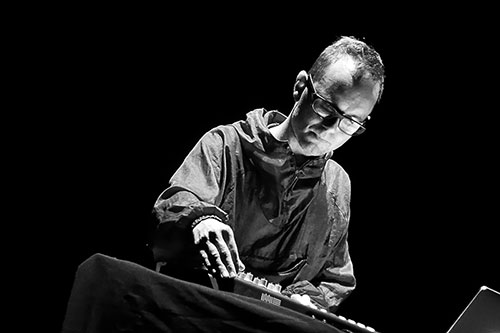
Thomas Knak 2015

Thomas Knak is a Danish electronic musician who has also produced work under the name Opiate. He worked with Björk on her Vespertine album and has produced remixes for Bomb the Bass and Coldcut. He also produced original music for the 2003 Danish film Reconstruction.

== Discography ==
- Objects for an Ideal Home (1999, April Records/Hobby Industries)
- Dub Tractor/Thomas Knak Split EP (2001, City Centre Offices)
- Dub Tractor/Thomas Knak Split EP (2001, Goodiepal)
- Opto Files (2001, Raster-Noton, with Carsten Nicolai)
- While You Were Sleeping (2002, April Records)
- Sometimes (2003, Morr Music)
- 2nd (2004, Hobby Industries, with Carsten Nicolai)

== Composer ==
- Reconstruction (2003) - drama movie by Christoffer Boe
- Allegro (2005) - drama movie by Christoffer Boe
- Enemies of Happiness (2006) - documentary by Eva Mulvad
- A Woman Among Warlords (2008) - documentary by Eva Mulvad
