= Jesper Skaaning =

Danish musician, producer and composer

- Also known as: Acustic; Altra; Skaaning
- Origin: Copenhagen, Denmark
- Genres: Electronic music, ambient, IDM
- Occupation(s): electronic musician producer
- Years active: 1980x - present
- Labels: April Records; Hobby Industries; Rump Recordings

Jesper Skaaning (a.k.a. Acustic) is a Danish electronic musician, producer and film composer. He started his career as a guitarist in various experimental punk bands in the early 1980s and was inspired by European electropop and early electronic music, especially Kraftwerk. At that time he formed a band, Acustisk Ungdom, from which he later took his name.

He formed Future 3 with Anders Remmer (a.k.a. Dub Tractor) and Thomas Knak (a.k.a. Opiate) in 1994. He is also a member of People Press Play and Jesper & Anders, also known as Recycler 202.

== Discography ==
=== Studio albums ===
- No 1 (April Records, 1996)
- Star Quality (April Records, 1998)
- Welcome (CD)(Rump Recordings, 2005)

=== Singles ===
- "Tease" (12”) - (Flex Records, 1995)
- "No 2" (12”) - (April Records, 1997)
- "Split" (12" with Goodiepal) - (Hobby Industries, 2000)
- "Split" (12” with RJ Valeo) - (Hobby Industries, 2002)
