= Anders Remmer =

- Also known as: CPH Jet; Dub Tractor; Jet; Sølvpil
- Origin: Copenhagen, Denmark
- Genres: Electronic, Ambient
- Occupations: Electronic musician Producer
- Years active: 1994–present
- Labels: City Centre Offices; Hobby Industries; FLEX Records

Anders Remmer is a Danish electronic musician, producer and film composer. He was born and raised in Denmark.

He is active in the electronic music community of Copenhagen, and his writings are known as either compositions for films or those he has released himself. Working with Thomas Knak (a.k.a. Opiate) and Jesper Skaaning (a.k.a. Acoustic), he has recorded a set of albums and singles under the "Future 3" and "System" monikers.

Anders Remmer is a member of several bands, including:

- System with Thomas Knak and Jesper Skaaning
- How Do I with Double Muffled Dolphin
- Jesper & Anders a.k.a. Recycler 202, with Jesper Skaaning
- People Press Play with Thomas Knak, Jesper Skaaning and Sara Savery

== Discography ==
=== Singles ===
as Jet

- Jet #1 (12") - (April Records, 1997)
- Jet #2 (12") - (April Records, 1997)
- OK (2xLP) - (April Records, 1998)

as Dub Tractor

- Overheated Livingroom EP (12″) - (FLEX Records, 1996)
- Scary H H Loop / 104 Dub (12") - (Additive Records, 1997)
- Tractor Beam EP (12") - (FX Records, 1997)
- Tractor Pull EP (12") - (FX Records, 1998)
- Spring Reverb EP (12") - (FLEX Records, 1999)
- Opiate / Dub Tractor Split (LP) - (City Centre Offices, 2001)
- Hum EP (12", EP) - (Hobby Industries, 2002)
- Promoblock 001 (7", Promo, Smplr) - (City Centre Offices, 2003)
- Faster EP (12", EP) - (City Centre Offices, 2004)

=== Albums ===
as Jet

- CPH 2000 - (April Records, 1997)
- OK - (April Records, 1998)

as Dub Tractor

- Discrete Recordings - (FLEX Records, 1994)
- An Evening with... - (FLEX Records/Additive Records, 1996)
- Delay - (FX Records, 2000)
- More or Less Mono - (City Centre Offices, 2003)
- Hideout - (City Centre Offices, 2006)
- Sorry (CD/LP) - (City Centre Offices, 2009)
