= CFRO-FM =

Community radio station in Vancouver, Canada

- Vancouver, British Columbia; Canada
- Broadcast area: Greater Vancouver
- Frequency: 100.5 MHz
- Branding: Co-op Radio

Programming
- Format: Community radio

Ownership
- Owner: Vancouver Co-operative Radio

History
- First air date: April 14, 1975
- Former frequencies: 102.7 MHz (1975–2012)

Technical information
- Class: C
- ERP: 2,800 watts 11,000 watts peak
- HAAT: 578 metres (1,896 ft)
- Transmitter coordinates: 49.3536°N 122.9572°W

Links
- Website: coopradio.org

CFRO-FM (100.5 MHz) is a non-commercial community radio station in Vancouver, British Columbia. It is a legally registered co-operative and is branded as Co-op Radio. It is owned by Vancouver Co-operative Radio, with studios and offices on Columbia Street off Hastings Street in Vancouver's Downtown Eastside. The station airs programmes in four categories: public affairs and news, music, multi-lingual and arts. The group producing each programme is mostly self-governing, within the co-operative frame. CFRO is a member of the National Campus and Community Radio Association.

CFRO-FM is a Class C FM station. It has an effective radiated power (ERP) of 2,800 watts (11,000 watts peak). The transmitter tower is atop Mount Seymour in the District of North Vancouver.

== History ==
CFRO-FM received its radio licence from the Canadian Radio-television and Telecommunications Commission (CRTC) on May 7, 1974. It took nearly a year to construct the station. CFRO-FM signed on the air on April 14, 1975. It was launched by volunteers mostly from local activist groups in Vancouver.

A former Co-op Radio logo, from when it was on 102.7 MHz.

On December 9, 2010, CFRO applied to exchange frequencies with CKPK-FM, which operated at 100.5 MHz. This application was approved by the Canadian Radio-television and Telecommunications Commission on September 9, 2011. The frequency swap occurred on September 10, 2012.

== Programming ==
Public affairs programmes and subjects in English include Redeye (news and analysis), Wake Up With Co-op, The Brown Bagger (lectures and interviews), Learning Coast Salish, Union Made (labour news). There are shows dealing with politics, women's rights, international affairs, health, LGBTQ issues, parenting, youth, the environment, animal rights, neighbourhood news, senior citizens, disabled people, and yoga. The syndicated American news show Democracy Now! is heard weekday mornings.

Programmes air in ten foreign languages: Armenian, Azeri, Amharic, Persian, Korean, Nepali, Polish, Serbo-Croatian, South Slav, and Spanish.

Music programmes specialize in numerous genres: aboriginal, accordion, African, alternative, bluegrass, blues, Caribbean, classical, Celtic, electronic, folk, fusion, gospel, hardcore, hip hop, house, India, jazz, Jewish, Latin, metal, old timey, punk, reggae, rock 'n' roll, roots, rumba, ska, soul, swing, tango, and world music. The weekly classical music program, "West Coast Classics," is the longest-running classical radio program produced in Canada.

Arts programming includes arts news, poetry, comedy, sound art, show tunes, and story-telling.

Nearly 100 different series air each week. Most of the late-night and week-end programmes are music and repeats, with public affairs and specialty talk programmes running mostly Monday through Friday in the day and evening.

== Licence ==
The station is licensed by the Canadian government's broadcast regulating agency, the Canadian Radio-television and Telecommunications Commission (CRTC). There are occasional licence challenges by members of the public who object to some viewpoints and issues being broadcast.

== Organisational structure ==
Founded in 1975, Co-operative Radio, CFRO, 100.5 FM is a non-profit community radio station and podcast recording studio.

They operate under the Community Radio Education Society (CRES) charity, which runs the Media Arts Committee (MAC). This foundation supports the audio community in Vancouver through grants and by lending artists and members the opportunity to borrow professional audio equipment. The Board of Directors and staff members are composed of nine individual volunteers. Their responsibilities include monitoring all station activities, hiring management and deliberating substantial decisions within the community.
