= Pamela Springsteen =

American actress and photographer (born 1962)

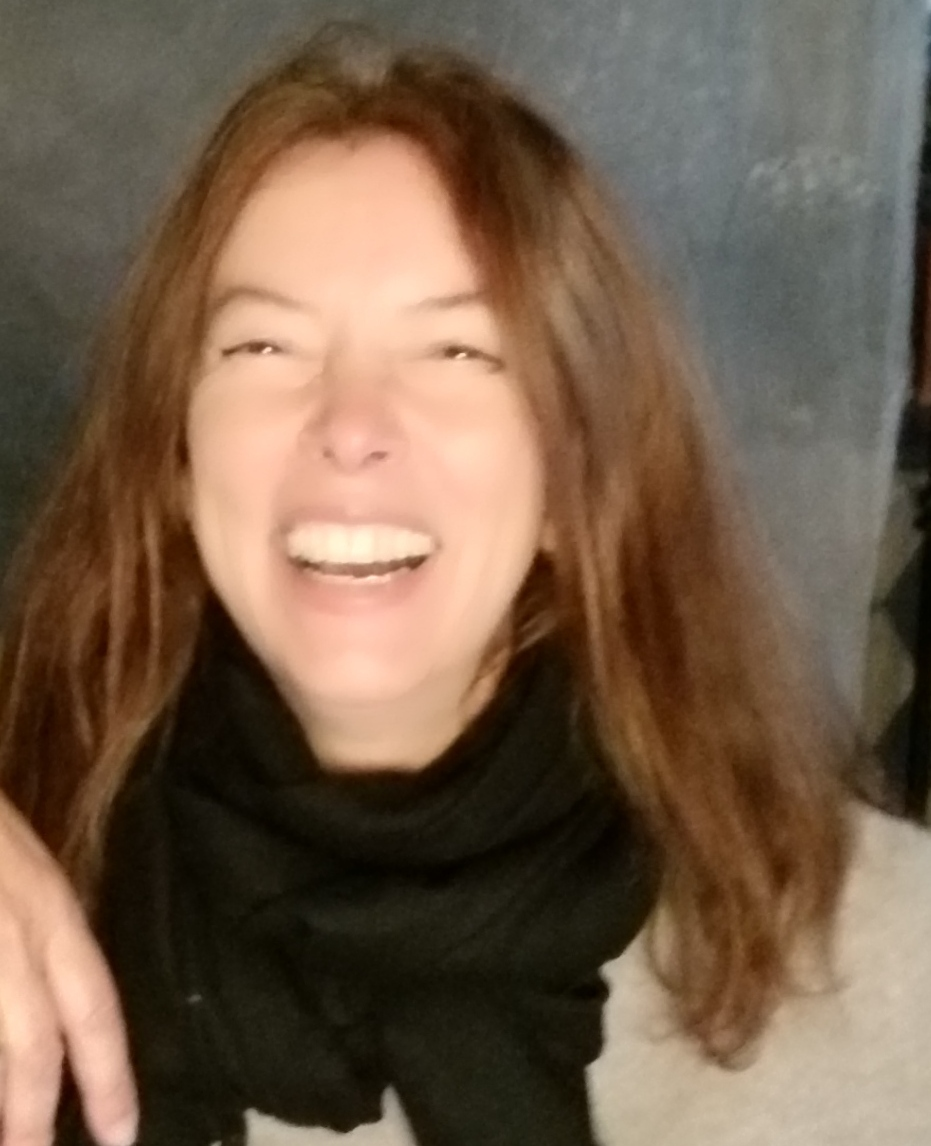
- Born: February 8, 1962 (age 64); Freehold Township, New Jersey, U.S.
- Other name: Pam Springsteen
- Occupations: Actress (1981–1990); Photographer
- Notable work: Sleepaway Camp II: Unhappy Campers (1988); Sleepaway Camp III: Teenage Wasteland (1989)
- Spouse: Bobby Roth (m. 2002)
- Children: 1
- Relatives: Bruce Springsteen (brother); Jessica Springsteen (niece)
- Website: pamelaspringsteen.com

Pamela Springsteen (born February 8, 1962) is an American actress and photographer. She had a short acting career, during which she played the role of serial killer Angela Baker in the cult films Sleepaway Camp II: Unhappy Campers (1988) and Sleepaway Camp III: Teenage Wasteland (1989). She had two co-starring roles in the obscure comedies Dixie Lanes (1988), The Gumshoe Kid (1990), and smaller roles in Fast Times at Ridgemont High (1982), Reckless (1984), and Modern Girls (1986). She is a still photographer in the film and music industry.

Rock musician Bruce Springsteen is her older brother.

== Early life and education ==
Pamela Springsteen was born in Freehold Township, New Jersey, to Adele Ann (née Zerilli), a legal secretary of Italian ancestry, and Douglas Frederick "Dutch" Springsteen, who was of Dutch and Irish ancestry, and worked as a bus driver. In 1969, when Springsteen was seven years old, she moved with her parents to California.

== Career ==
=== Actress ===
Springsteen took up acting, and was cast in her first role as a young cheerleader in the 1982 comedy Fast Times at Ridgemont High. Two years later, in 1984, she appeared as a cheerleader in the film Reckless. She appeared in Modern Girls, and Scenes from the Goldmine.

In 1988, she obtained her first main supporting role, playing the character Judy in the comedy film Dixie Lanes. The same year, she had her first lead role, playing psychotic serial killer Angela Baker in cult horror Sleepaway Camp II: Unhappy Campers, a role she reprised the following year in Sleepaway Camp III: Teenage Wasteland. The films have earned her a following among horror fans. Due to this she had a 10-minute supporting role as Mary Beth Bensen in a sex comedy by the same makers titled Fast Food. Her final film appearance to date was in 1990 film The Gumshoe Kid.

Springsteen also made guest appearances on television series such as The Facts of Life, Cagney & Lacey, Hardcastle and McCormick, and Family Ties. She left acting in order to pursue her career as a still photographer.

=== Photographer ===
Springsteen began her career as a still photographer in the film and music industry. She photographed for a number of her brother's record singles, albums and other publicity stills, and was credited with photography on his 1992 album Lucky Town. She also photographed a number of other album covers for Vonda Shepard and N.W.A. She was also credited as the cinematographer on his music video "The Ghost of Tom Joad". Springsteen also photographed Olivia Newton-John for the cover of her 2005 album, Stronger Than Before.

She did still photography work on the films Jack the Dog, Manhood and Berkeley, the television films The Price of a Broken Heart and Dancing at the Harvest Moon, and the documentary The Making of the Crying Game. She was a photo consultant on the television film The Devil's Child.

=== Other work ===
Springsteen directed the music video for the song "These Words We Said", by singer Kim Richey.

== Personal life ==
Springsteen was briefly engaged to Sean Penn, her co-star in Fast Times at Ridgemont High. She married Bobby Roth in 2002.

== Filmography ==
Film
Year	Title	Role	Director
1982	Fast Times at Ridgemont High	Dina Phillips	Amy Heckerling
1984	Reckless	Karen Sybern	James Foley
1985	My Science Project	Hall Monitor/Ellie's Friend (scenes deleted)	Jonathan R. Betuel
1986	Modern Girls	Tanya	Jerry Kramer
1987	Scenes from the Goldmine	Stephanie	Marc Rocco
1988	Dixie Lanes	Judy	Don Cato
1988	Sleepaway Camp II: Unhappy Campers	Angela Baker/Angela Johnson	Michael A. Simpson
1989	Fast Food	Mary Beth Bensen	Michael A. Simpson
1989	Sleepaway Camp III: Teenage Wasteland	Angela Baker	Michael A. Simpson
1990	The Gumshoe Kid	Mona Krause	Joseph Manduke
2012	Sleepaway Camp IV: The Survivor	Angela Baker (archival footage only)	Jim Markovic

Television
Year	Title	Role	Notes
1982	The Facts of Life	Sally	"Starstruck" (S3E15)
1982	Cagney & Lacey	Opal Durrell	"Hotline" (S2E05)
1984	My Mother's Secret Life	Kelly	TV movie
1984	Hardcastle and McCormick	Gena	"Outlaw Champion" (S2E01)
1985	Family Ties	Gail	"Don't Go Changin'" (S4E05)

Non-acting work
Year	Title	Credited work	Notes
1996	Bruce Springsteen: The Ghost of Tom Joad	Cinematographer	Music video
1997	The Devil's Child	Photo consultant	Feature film
1999	The Price of a Broken Heart	Still photographer	TV movie
2001	Jack the Dog	Photographer	Feature film
2002	Dancing at the Harvest Moon	Still photographer	TV movie
2003	Manhood	Still photographer	Feature film
2005	The Making of The Crying Game	Still photographer	Behind-the-scenes video
2005	Berkeley	Still photographer	Feature film
2016	A Director Prepares: Bobby Roth's Masterclass	Camera operator	TV series
2016	Nanoblood	Still photographer	Short film
2023	Hanky Panky	Associate producer	Feature film
