= Tracey Walter =

American actor (born 1947)

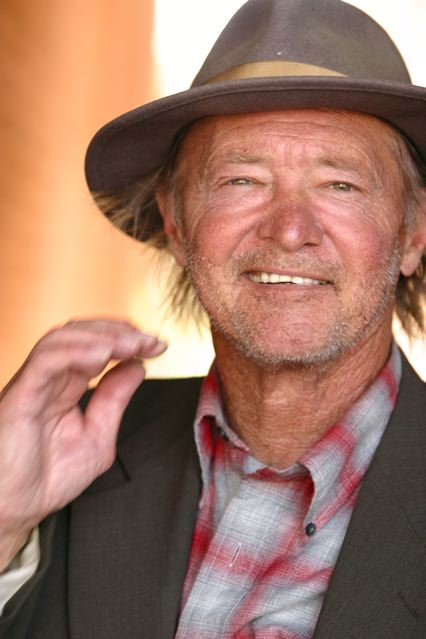
- Walter in 2006
- Born: November 25, 1947 (age 78); Jersey City, New Jersey, U.S.
- Occupation: Actor
- Years active: 1971–2016
- Children: 2

Tracey Walter (born November 25, 1947) is an American retired character actor, who appeared in more than 170 films and television roles. He is best known for his appearances alongside his real-life friend Jack Nicholson, as well as having been a regular collaborator of directors Jonathan Demme and Danny DeVito. He won a Saturn Award for Best Supporting Actor for his role as Miller in Repo Man.

== Early life ==
Walter was born and grew up in Jersey City, New Jersey, the son of a truck driver. He attended St. Anthony's High School there and played basketball. He credited the off-Broadway play Scuba Duba with spurring his interest in acting. He studied acting under Jean Stapleton at the Totem Pole Playhouse in Fayetteville, Pennsylvania. He made his screen debut in the low-budget exploitation film Ginger.

== Career ==
Walter is known for his portrayal of "sidekicks" and "henchmen", such as Bob the Goon in Batman, Cookie in City Slickers, and Malak in Conan the Destroyer. He portrayed Frog Rothchild Jr. on the ABC sitcom Best of the West from 1981 to 1982.

Walter is well-known for his appearances alongside his real-life friend Jack Nicholson. The two appeared in nine films together, beginning with Goin' South in 1978. Walter has acted in six Jonathan Demme films: Something Wild (1986), Married to the Mob (1988), The Silence of the Lambs (1991), Philadelphia (1993), Beloved (1998), and The Manchurian Candidate (2004). He has been directed by Danny DeVito in three films: Matilda (1996), Death to Smoochy (2002), and Duplex (2003).

His portrayal of Miller, the philosopher mechanic of Alex Cox's Repo Man, earned Walter a Saturn Award in 1985 for Best Supporting Actor. In the 2000 film Erin Brockovich, Walter played Charles Embry, the PG&E employee who supplied internal paperwork that included a memo that tied an executive at the PG&E corporate headquarters to the knowledge of the Hinkley station water contamination.

Walter's television credits include guest appearances on WKRP in Cincinnati, Taxi, Charlie's Angels, Hill Street Blues, Amazing Stories, Moonlighting, David Lynch's On the Air, Melrose Place, The Division, Veronica Mars, Criminal Minds and Cold Case. He appeared on Nash Bridges as Angel from 1996 to 2001 and on Reno 911! as Sheriff Walter Chechekevitch from 2003 to 2006.

== Personal life ==
Walter has two children.

== Filmography ==
=== Film ===
| Year | Title | Role | Notes |
|---|---|---|---|
| 1971 | Ginger | Ginger's Brother | |
| 1971 | The Hospital | Man in Crowd | Uncredited |
| 1973 | Badge 373 | Delivery Boy | |
| 1973 | Serpico | Street Urchin | Uncredited |
| 1977 | Annie Hall | Actor in Rob's T.V. Show | |
| 1977 | Mad Bull | Coley Turner | |
| 1978 | Blue Collar | Union Member | |
| 1978 | Goin' South | Coogan | |
| 1978 | The Fifth Floor | Mental Patient | |
| 1979 | Hardcore | Porn Store Clerk | |
| 1980 | The Octagon | Beatty | Uncredited |
| 1980 | The Hunter | Rocco Mason | |
| 1981 | The Hand | Cop | |
| 1981 | Raggedy Man | Arnold | |
| 1982 | Timerider: The Adventure of Lyle Swann | Carl Dorsett | |
| 1982 | Honkytonk Man | 'Pooch' | |
| 1983 | Rumble Fish | Alley Mugger | |
| 1984 | Repo Man | Miller | |
| 1984 | Conan the Destroyer | Malak | |
| 1986 | At Close Range | Patch Whitewood | |
| 1986 | Something Wild | The Country Squire | |
| 1987 | Malone | Calvin Bollard | |
| 1988 | Mortuary Academy | Don Dickson | |
| 1988 | Midnight Run | Diner Counter Man | |
| 1988 | Married to the Mob | Chicken Lickin' Manager | |
| 1989 | Under the Boardwalk | Bum | |
| 1989 | Out of the Dark | Lieutenant Frank Meyers | |
| 1989 | Batman | Bob Hawkins, The Goon | |
| 1989 | Homer and Eddie | Tommy Dearly | |
| 1990 | Young Guns II | Beever Smith | |
| 1990 | The Two Jakes | Tyrone Otley | |
| 1990 | Pacific Heights | The Exterminator | |
| 1991 | The Silence of the Lambs | Lamar | |
| 1991 | Liquid Dreams | Cecil | |
| 1991 | Delusion | Bus Ticket Cashier | |
| 1991 | City Slickers | 'Cookie' | |
| 1992 | Guncrazy | Elton | |
| 1993 | Amos & Andrew | Bob 'Bloodhound Bob' | |
| 1993 | Cyborg 2 | 'Wild Card' | |
| 1993 | Philadelphia | Librarian | |
| 1994 | Junior | Janitor With Information | Uncredited |
| 1995 | Fist of the North Star | Paul McCarthy | |
| 1995 | Destiny Turns on the Radio | 'Pappy' | |
| 1996 | Larger than Life | Wee St. Francis | |
| 1996 | Matilda | FBI Agent Bill | |
| 1996 | Entertaining Angels: The Dorothy Day Story | Joe Bennett | |
| 1996 | Amanda | Father Reckinger | |
| 1997 | Wild America | Leon | |
| 1997 | Drive | 'Hedgehog' | |
| 1997 | Playing God | Jim | |
| 1998 | Desperate Measures | Medical Inmate | |
| 1998 | Beloved | Slave Catcher | |
| 1998 | Mighty Joe Young | Conservancy Guard | |
| 1999 | Façade | Jake | |
| 1999 | Man on the Moon | National Enquirer Editor | |
| 2000 | Drowning Mona | Clarence | |
| 2000 | Erin Brockovich | Charles Embry | |
| 2001 | Jack the Dog | The Mortician | |
| 2001 | The Man from Elysian Fields | The Bartender | |
| 2001 | How High | Professor Wood | |
| 2001 | Impostor | Mr. Siegel | |
| 2002 | Death to Smoochy | Ben Franks | |
| 2002 | Ted Bundy | Randy Myers | |
| 2003 | Masked and Anonymous | Desk Clerk | |
| 2003 | Manhood | Attorney | |
| 2003 | Duplex | Pharmacy Customer | |
| 2004 | One Last Ride | Nicky | |
| 2004 | The Manchurian Candidate | Night Clerk | |
| 2005 | Berkeley | Draft Board Doctor | |
| 2006 | Relative Strangers | Toupee Salesman | |
| 2007 | Man in the Chair | Mr. Klein | |
| 2007 | Nobel Son | Simon Ahrens | |
| 2007 | Wasting Away | Mr. Whicks | |
| 2008 | Trailer Park of Terror | Ancient Trucker | |
| 2008 | Just Add Water | Clem | |
| 2008 | Dark Reel | Roy White | |
| 2009 | The Perfect Game | Captain Slater | |
| 2010 | I Spit on Your Grave | Earl | |
| 2011 | Midnight Son | The Janitor | |
| 2011 | Politics of Love | Glen | |
| 2011 | Alyce Kills | The Landlord | |
| 2013 | Savannah | Mathias | |
| 2014 | Swelter | Henry Johnson | |
| 2016 | 31 | Leo 'Lucky Leo' | |
| 2016 | Middle Man | Father Ricky, Lil J | |
| 2016 | Wakefield | Homeless Man | |

=== Television ===
| Year | Title | Role | Notes |
|---|---|---|---|
| 1978 | Lucan | Junior Hall | Episode: "The Lost Boy" |
| 1978 | Starsky & Hutch | Leo | Episode: "Dandruff" |
| 1979 | WKRP in Cincinnati | Don Pesola #2 | Episode: "The Contest Nobody Could Win" |
| 1979 | Vega$ | Jimmy Potter | Episode: "Mixed Blessing" |
| 1980 | Charlie's Angels | Clint Mason | Episode: "An Angel's Trail" |
| 1980 | High Noon, Part II: The Return of Will Kane | Harlan Tyler | Television film |
| 1981–82 | Best of the West | 'Frog' Rothchild Jr. | 21 episodes |
| 1982 | The Fall Guy | Skip | Episode: "The Silent Partner" |
| 1982 | Seven Brides for Seven Brothers | Lucky | Episode: "Gold Fever" |
| 1982, 1983 | Hill Street Blues | Willie Laporter, Sammy | 2 episodes |
| 1982–83 | Filthy Rich | Alvin Essary | 2 episodes |
| 1983 | Cagney & Lacey | Boone | Episode: "The Gang's All Here" |
| 1983 | Taxi | Panhandler | Episode: "A Grand Gesture" |
| 1983 | Bill: On His Own | Kenny | Television film |
| 1984 | Hunter | Archie | Episode: "Pen Pals" |
| 1985, 1986 | Amazing Stories | Blaze, Ezra | 2 episodes |
| 1986 | Airwolf | Alvin | Episode: "Wildfire" |
| 1987 | Ohara | Candy | Episode: "Louie" |
| 1987 | Timestalkers | Sam | Television film |
| 1987 | Designing Women | Malcolm Box | Episode: "Seams from a Marriage" |
| 1987 | Moonlighting | Arnie Steckler | 2 episodes |
| 1987–88 | ALF | Gus 'Gravel Gus' | 2 episodes |
| 1987, 1992 | Star Trek: The Next Generation | Berik, Kayron | 2 episodes |
| 1988 | The Bronx Zoo | Mr. Woshinsky | 3 episodes |
| 1988 | The French as Seen by... | Dusty | 2 episodes |
| 1989 | Alien Nation | Tom Mulden | Episode: "The Takeover" |
| 1989–90 | Freddy's Nightmares | Eugene Moss / The Gravedigger | 2 episodes |
| 1990 | Get a Life | The Ride Operator | 2 episodes |
| 1991 | Monsters | Ed, The Janitor | Episode: "Hostile Takeover" |
| 1991 | She-Wolf of London | Boris | Episode: "Bride of the Wolfman" |
| 1992 | On the Air | 'Blinky' Watts | 7 episodes |
| 1992 | Wings | Tucker | Episode: "Two Jerks and a Jill" |
| 1993 | The Adventures of Brisco County, Jr. | Phil Swill | 2 episodes |
| 1993 | The Mommies | Clerk | Episode: "Christmas" |
| 1993 | Ultraman: The Ultimate Hero | Security Guard | Episode: "Dino Might (Gomora)" |
| 1994 | Melrose Place | Man At 'Dreamy Pines' | Episode: "Love, Mancini Style" |
| 1994 | Ride with the Wind | Francis | Television film |
| 1994 | L.A. Law | John Rosten | Episode: "Whistle Stop" |
| 1994 | Empty Nest | Mr. Malloy | Episode: "Best Friends" |
| 1995 | Kidnapped: In the Line of Duty | Oliver Tracy | Television film |
| 1995 | Buffalo Girls | Jim Ragg | Miniseries |
| 1996–2001 | Nash Bridges | Peter Spielman, Angel | 8 episodes |
| 1997 | Tell Me No Secrets | Sean Ferguson | Television film |
| 1997 | The Devil's Child | Ezra | Television film, uncredited |
| 1998 | Brimstone | Knapsack | Episode: "Repentance" |
| 1998 | L.A. Doctors | Drug Store Guy | Episode: "Endless Bummer" |
| 2002 | The Division | Tom Johnson | Episode: "Forgive Me, Father" |
| 2002 | Boomtown | Dwayne | Episode: "Reelin' in the Years" |
| 2003 | Teen Titans | Puppet King (voice) | Episode: "Switched" |
| 2003 | Justice League | Mophir (voice) | Episode: "Eclipsed" |
| 2003–06 | Reno 911! | Sheriff Walter Chechekevitch | 4 episodes |
| 2005 | Family Plan | Lou | Television film |
| 2005 | Veronica Mars | Manager | Episode: "Rat Saw God" |
| 2006 | The Year Without a Santa Claus | Abominable Snowman | Television film, uncredited |
| 2007 | Raines | William Jones | Episode: "Pilot" |
| 2007 | It's Always Sunny in Philadelphia | Bum | Episode: "Bums: Making a Mess All Over the City" |
| 2008 | Criminal Minds | Ike Stratman | Episode: "Elephant's Memory" |
| 2008 | Monk | The Professor | Episode: "Mr. Monk and the Miracle" |
| 2009 | Prison Break | Janitor | Episode: "Rate of Exchange"; uncredited |
| 2009 | Cold Case | Cotter Doyle '09 | Episode: "The Crossing" |
| 2010 | Medium | Walter Durant | Episode: "Bring Your Daughter to Work Day" |
| 2012 | Southland | Tom Smith | Episode: "Identity" |
| 2012 | Fred 3: Camp Fred | Gary 'Scary Gary' | Television film |
