= Thomas Gibson =

American actor and director (born 1962)

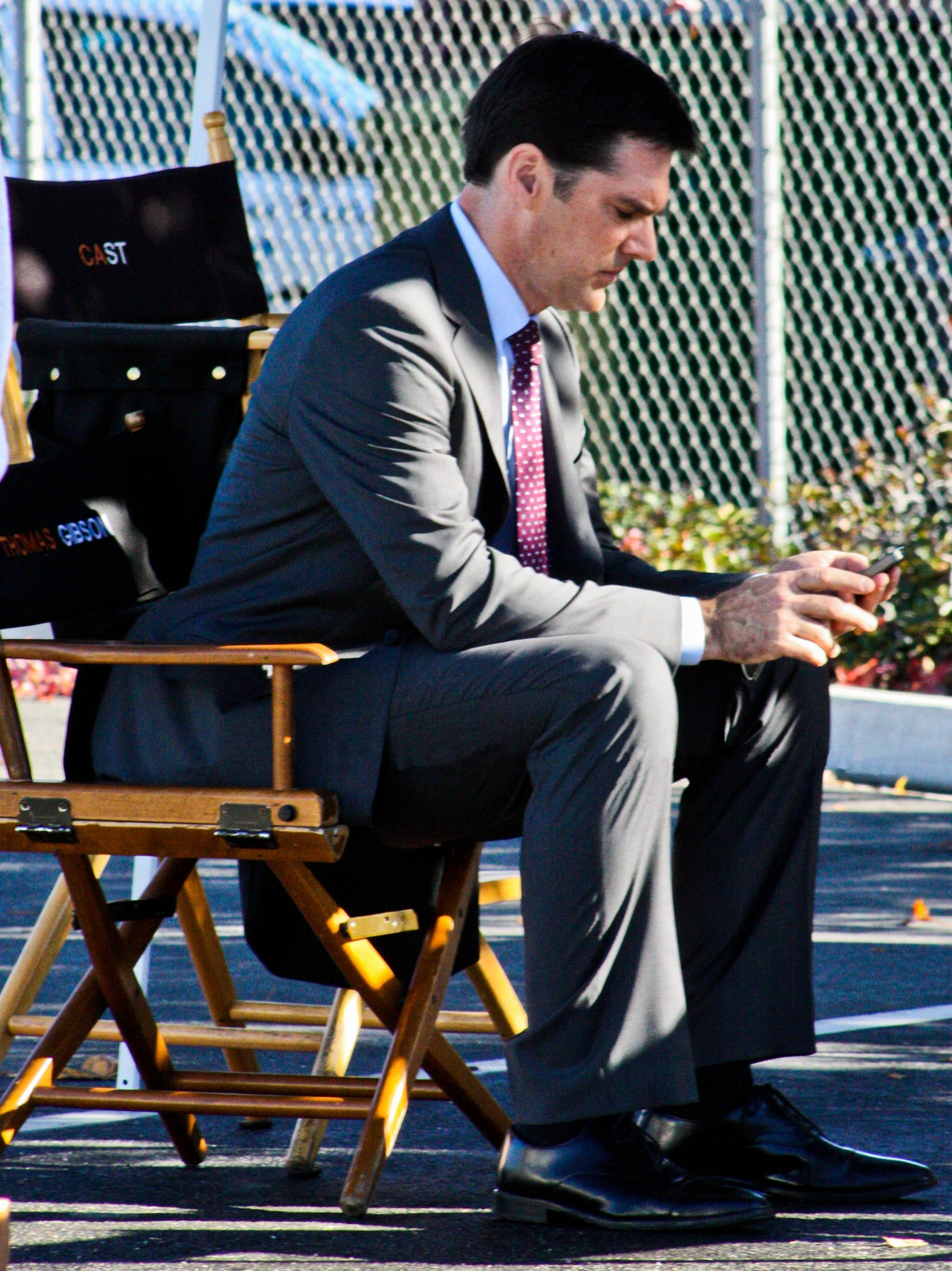
- Gibson on the set of Criminal Minds in 2010
- Born: Thomas Ellis Gibson; July 3, 1962 (age 64); Charleston, South Carolina, U.S.
- Education: Juilliard School (BFA)
- Occupations: Actor, director
- Years active: 1979–present
- Known for: Aaron Hotchner in Criminal Minds; Daniel Nyland in Chicago Hope; Greg Montgomery in Dharma and Greg
- Spouse: Christine Parker (m. 1993; div. 2018)
- Children: 3

Thomas Ellis Gibson (born July 3, 1962) is an American actor and director best known for his roles as Aaron Hotchner on Criminal Minds (2005–16), Greg Montgomery on Dharma & Greg (1997–2002) and Daniel Nyland on Chicago Hope (1994–97).

== Early life ==
Gibson was born in Charleston, South Carolina, to Charles M. and Beth Gibson. He has three brothers and two sisters.

His mother was a social worker, and his father was a lawyer and liberal Democrat who served in the South Carolina state Senate and House. He is Catholic. Gibson's interest in the performing arts began at a young age. Gibson was fascinated by Louis Armstrong. He and his sister were on a swim team together, and they frequented a pizza parlor after their swim meets. It was at this pizza parlor that Gibson would sing along with a Dixieland band, complete with his attempt to impersonate Armstrong's singing voice.

As a child, Gibson enrolled in Little Theater School and later graduated from Bishop England High School. He then attended the College of Charleston (1979–1981) and became an intern at the Alabama Shakespeare Festival, where he was encouraged to apply to the Juilliard School. After a year and a half at Charleston, Gibson won a scholarship to Juilliard's Drama Division (Group 14: 1981–1985), where he graduated with a Bachelor of Fine Arts degree in 1985.

== Career ==
Gibson started acting when he was nine years old, in children's theater. He appeared in Julian Wiles' Seize the Street: the Skateboard Musical, a Young Charleston Theater Company (now Charleston Stage) production. As a teenager, he began his classical theater training by becoming a member of the Young Charleston Theater Company and the Footlight Players, often performing at the historic Dock Street Theatre. During his time at College of Charleston, Gibson was an intern at the Alabama Shakespeare Festival. Gibson made his stage debut in David Hare's A Map of the World in the New York Shakespeare Festival. He subsequently appeared in more plays for producer Joe Papp, both in Public Theater and in Central Park. He worked on and off Broadway for the next 10 years in a range of plays by Shakespeare, Christopher Marlowe, Molière, Tennessee Williams, Howard Brenton, Romulus Linney, Noël Coward, and Alan Ball. Gibson also waited tables at Tavern on the Green.

Gibson's first television appearance was in 1987, in a guest role on the legal drama Leg Work, followed by stints on the daytime dramas As the World Turns and Another World. In 1992, Gibson made his movie debut in Ron Howard's Far and Away, in which he portrayed Stephen Chase. Chase was the villainous rival of Joseph Donnelly (Tom Cruise) for Shannon Christie's (Nicole Kidman) affections. His next lead role was in 1993 as David, a gay waiter, in Denys Arcand's Love and Human Remains. Also in 1993, he played bisexual businessman misanthrope Beauchamp Day in the television version of Armistead Maupin's Tales of the City (1993). At the time, Tales of the City was highly controversial for its gay, transgender, bisexual, and drag-queen characters along with nudity, sexual situations, drug use, and explicit language. Gibson later reunited with Arcand in Stardom (2000). In 1999, Gibson had a supporting role in Stanley Kubrick's final film Eyes Wide Shut, where he was reunited with Cruise and Kidman. Gibson then returned to television, portraying Dr. Danny Nyland on the medical drama Chicago Hope from 1994 to 1998. From 1997 to 2002, Gibson portrayed Greg Montgomery in the sitcom Dharma & Greg, for which he was nominated twice for a Golden Globe Award. In 2001, he directed two episodes in the final season of Dharma & Greg. After Dharma & Greg, Gibson appeared in various TV movies.

Most recently, Gibson starred in a play Henry Johnson which made its premiere in April 2025 at Chicago's Victory Gardens Theater.

=== Criminal Minds ===
In 2005, Gibson was cast as Supervisory Special Agent Aaron "Hotch" Hotchner, the unit chief of the Behavioral Analysis Unit (BAU), in the series Criminal Minds.

Gibson directed six episodes of Criminal Minds beginning in 2013. Gibson had a prior altercation with an assistant director and had undergone anger-management counseling at that time.

On August 11, 2016, Gibson was suspended (after appearing in two episodes of the 12th season of Criminal Minds) following an on-set altercation with writer-producer Virgil Williams; he apologized for the confrontation in a statement, claiming the dispute arose from creative differences in an episode he was directing.

The following day, ABC Studios and CBS Television Studios (which co-distribute Criminal Minds) issued a statement announcing that Gibson's contract with the series had been terminated. The statement included the information that his character's exit story from the series had yet to be determined. In the October 12, 2016, episode "Taboo", the absence of Gibson's character is explained as being away on special assignment; however, in the episode "Elliot's Pond", it is revealed that he resigned and went into the Witness Protection Program after discovering that a serial killer was stalking his son.

== Personal life ==
Gibson resided in San Antonio, Texas, and has a house on Sullivan's Island, South Carolina, which he frequents. Gibson has three children. Gibson and his wife Christine separated in 2011, and he filed for divorce in 2014. The divorce was final on February 14, 2018.

Gibson enjoys golf. He plays at the AT&T Pebble Beach Pro-Am every year, as well as other golfing events, and is friends with golfer Corey Pavin. He was part of the 2010 Host Committee for the Inaugural SAG Foundation Golf Classic, and he co-hosted the 2nd Annual SAG Foundation Golf Classic with Criminal Minds castmate Joe Mantegna.

== Filmography ==
=== Film ===
| Year | Title | Role | Notes |
|---|---|---|---|
| 1992 | Far and Away | Stephen Chase | |
| 1993 | Love and Human Remains | David | |
| 1993 | The Age of Innocence | Stage Actor | |
| 1994 | Barcelona | Dickie Taylor | |
| 1994 | Men of War | Warren | |
| 1994 | Sleep with Me | Nigel | |
| 1997 | The Next Step | Bartender | |
| 1999 | Eyes Wide Shut | Carl | |
| 2000 | Psycho Beach Party | Kanaka | |
| 2000 | The Flintstones in Viva Rock Vegas | Chip Rockefeller | |
| 2000 | Stardom | Renny Ohayon | |
| 2001 | Jack the Dog | Faith's Attorney | |
| 2003 | Manhood | Faith's Attorney | |
| 2005 | Come Away Home | Gary | |
| 2005 | Berkeley | Thomas | |
| 2007 | I'll Believe You | Kyle Sweeney | |
| 2014 | Son of Batman | Slade Wilson / Deathstroke | Voice role |
| 2017 | Axis | Joseph | Voice role |
| 2019 | Shadow Wolves | Colonel Branson | |

=== Television ===
| Year | Title | Role | Notes |
|---|---|---|---|
| 1987 | Leg Work | Robbie | Episode: "All This and a Gold Card Too" |
| 1987 | Guiding Light | Peter Latham | |
| 1988 | Lincoln | William Sprague | Miniseries |
| 1988–1990 | As the World Turns | Derek Mason | |
| 1990 | The Kennedys of Massachusetts | Peter Fitzwilliam | Miniseries |
| 1990 | Another World | Sam Fowler | |
| 1993 | Tales of the City | Beauchamp Day | Miniseries |
| 1994–1997 | Chicago Hope | Daniel Nyland | 70 episodes |
| 1995 | Secrets | Hailus Tuckman | Television film |
| 1996 | Duckman | Thomas Gibson | Episode: "Pig Amok" |
| 1996 | Night Visitors | Ross Williams | Television film |
| 1996 | To Love, Honor and Deceive | Matthew Carpenter / Stuart Buchanan | Television film |
| 1996 | Caroline in the City | Willard Stevens | Episode: "Caroline and the Nice Jewish Boy" |
| 1996 | The Real Adventures of Jonny Quest | Paul Mornay | Voice; Episode: "Ghost Quest" |
| 1997 | The Inheritance | James Percy | Television film |
| 1997 | The Devil's Child | Alexander Rotha | Television film |
| 1997–2002 | Dharma & Greg | Greg Montgomery | 119 episodes |
| 1998 | More Tales of the City | Beauchamp Talbot Day | Miniseries |
| 1998 | Sin City Spectacular | Unknown | Episode: "1.6" |
| 1998 | A Will of Their Own | James MacLaren | Episode: "1.1" |
| 1998 | Nightmare Street | Dr. Matt Westbrook / Joe Barnes | Television film |
| 2001 | The Monkey King | Nicholas Orton | Television film |
| 2003 | Brush with Fate | Richard | Television film |
| 2003 | Evil Never Dies | Detective Mark Ryan | Television film |
| 2004 | Raising Waylon | Reg | Television film |
| 2004 | Category 6: Day of Destruction | Mitch Benson | Television film |
| 2005 | Stone Cold | Troy Drake | Television film |
| 2005–2016 | Criminal Minds | Aaron Hotchner | Lead role; 256 episodes (Seasons 1–12) |
| 2006 | In from the Night | Aiden Byrnes | Television film |
| 2011 | Two and a Half Men | Greg Montgomery | Episode: "Nice to Meet You, Walden Schmidt" |
| 2015 | Hot in Cleveland | Tom | Episodes: "Vegas Baby", "I Hate Goodbyes" |

=== As director ===
| Year | Title | Notes |
|---|---|---|
| 2001 | Dharma & Greg | Episodes: "The Story of K", "A Fish Tale" (Seasons 4 and 5) |
| 2013–2016 | Criminal Minds | Episodes: "All That Remains", "Gabby", "Boxed In", "Lockdown", "The Night Watch", "Derek" (season 8, 9, 10 and 11) |

== Awards and nominations ==
| Year | Award | Category | Work | Result |
|---|---|---|---|---|
| 1995 | Screen Actors Guild Award | Outstanding Performance by an Ensemble in a Drama Series | Chicago Hope | Nominated |
| 1996 | Screen Actors Guild Award | Outstanding Performance by an Ensemble in a Drama Series | Chicago Hope | Nominated |
| 1997 | Screen Actors Guild Award | Outstanding Performance by an Ensemble in a Drama Series | Chicago Hope | Nominated |
| 1998 | Q Awards | Best Actor in a Quality Comedy Series | Dharma & Greg | Nominated |
| 1999 | Golden Globe | Best Performance by an Actor in a TV Series - Comedy/Musical | Dharma & Greg | Nominated |
| 2000 | Satellite Award | Best Performance by an Actor in a Series, Comedy or Musical | Dharma & Greg | Nominated |
| 2000 | Golden Globe | Best Performance by an Actor in a TV Series - Comedy/Musical | Dharma & Greg | Nominated |
| 2010 | Entertainment Weekly online poll | Under-appreciated Entertainer of the Year | Criminal Minds | Won |
