= Rainbow Drive =

- Poster and VHS cover of "Rainbow Drive"
- Genre: Thriller
- Based on: Rainbow Drive by Roderick Thorp
- Teleplay by: Bill Phillips; Bennett Cohen
- Directed by: Bobby Roth
- Starring: Peter Weller; Sela Ward; David Caruso; Tony Jay
- Theme music composer: Tangerine Dream
- Country of origin: United States
- Original language: English

Production
- Executive producer: Michael Viner
- Producer: John Veitch
- Cinematography: Tim Suhrstedt
- Editor: Henk Van Eeghen
- Running time: 100 minutes
- Production companies: Dove International; ITC Entertainment; Viacom Pictures

Original release
- Network: Showtime
- Release: September 8, 1990

Rainbow Drive is a 1990 American made-for-television thriller film directed by Bobby Roth and starring Peter Weller, Sela Ward and David Caruso. The film first aired on September 8, 1990, on the Showtime Cable Network. It is based on the 1986 novel of the same name by Roderick Thorp.

Rainbow Drive was given a very limited theatrical release. It was released in America and the UK on VHS. The film was nominated for one Mystfest award, for "Best Film" (Bobby Roth). The soundtrack was scored by Tangerine Dream, but was never released as a stand-alone release. The title track was later included on the bootleg Prayer of Quiet Dreams in 1993.

== Plot ==
Mike Gallagher is one of Los Angeles' top cops, who is acting head of Hollywood's homicide division. But Gallagher is soon wrenched out of his orderly existence into a dirty world of killing and corruption. Gallagher's affair with a married woman leads him to stumble across a vicious scene of multiple murders on L.A. highway Rainbow Drive. Gallagher senses something strange when reinforcements arrive even before he has called them. When his superiors freeze him out of the case, Gallagher begins his own investigation. With the help of mysterious ally Laura Demming, Gallagher draws closer to the truth, and danger moves closer to his partner and mistress. His investigation propels him into a web of drugs and vice, corruption and cover-up - an intricate web that implicates some of the city's most senior figures.

== Cast ==
- Peter Weller as Mike Gallagher
- Sela Ward as Laura Demming
- David Caruso as Larry Hammond
- Tony Jay as Max Hollister
- James Laurenson as Hans Roehrig
- Jon Gries as Azzolini
- Henry G. Sanders as Marvin Burgess
- Chris Mulkey as Ira Rosenberg
- David Neidorf as Bernie Maxwell
- Bruce Weitz as Dan Crawford
- Chelcie Ross as Tom Cutler
- Rutanya Alda as Marge Crawford
- Megan Mullally as Ava Zieff
- Michael Bruce as Rudy

== Critical reception ==
Jason Ankeny of Allmovie gave the film three out of five stars, stating: "In this made-for-cable adaptation of Roderick Thorp's crime thriller, Peter Weller stars as a Hollywood cop whose murder investigation runs into a wall of police corruption." The book Video Movie Guide 1996 awarded the film two and a half stars out of five, while VideoHound's Golden Movie Retriever gave the film two out of five stars.
