= Denise Faye =

American actress and choreographer

- Born: Denise Faye Greenbaum; July 16, 1963 (age 63); New York City, New York, United States
- Education: Barnard College, Columbia University, School of American Ballet
- Occupations: Actress; dancer; choreographer; director
- Years active: 1988–2014

Denise Faye Greenbaum (born July 16, 1963) is an American actress, dancer, choreographer, and director. She is the recipient of an American Choreography Award, as well as a Screen Actor's Guild Award for the 2002 film Chicago. Faye won the Dance Track Magazine Artist Award for best choreography in a feature film for her work in Burlesque. Additionally, she received nominations including the Fred and Adele Astaire Award and The World Dance Awards for her choreography in Burlesque.

== Career ==
In 2014, Faye co-directed and choreographed much of Cher's Dressed to Kill tour. Later she directed the concert DVD of Martha Davis & the Motels Live at the Whisky a Go Go's 50th Anniversary, released in the summer of 2015. Next she directed a music video for Martha Davis and the Motels.

Faye directed the staged reading of the musical The Magic Horn, written by Charlie Midnight, James Marr and Wendy Piggott at The Geffen Playhouse in Los Angeles, which was being developed for the Broadway stage.

Faye's choreography includes working with Hugh Jackman on a multimillion-dollar live extravaganza for Steve Wynn, Jennifer Aniston's strip tease in We're the Millers, and re-staging/choreographing Catherine Zeta-Jones in All That Jazz for the 85th Annual Academy Awards.

Among her many Broadway credits are Chicago, Guys and Dolls and Jerome Robbins Broadway. Plays include works at the Public Theater, Lincoln Center Theater, Williamstown Theater Festival and Second Stage Theater.

Her choreography can be seen in such films as My Week with Marilyn, We're the Millers, Burlesque, and working alongside her mentor, Rob Marshall, in the Academy Award–winning Chicago, and Nine, among others. In television, she has choreographed and directed segments on shows such as The American Music Awards, Dancing with the Stars, and The X Factor UK. Additionally, she has choreographed many television commercials including GoDaddy for the 2012 Super Bowl and Dasani Water for the 2012 Summer Olympics.

Prior to this, Faye trained at the School of American Ballet, danced with the New York City Ballet and then attended Barnard College with a double major in Urban Studies and Psychology. She has also danced in the Jon Bon Jovi music video "Queen of New Orleans", which was the first single from Jon's solo album Destination Anywhere.

In one of her most recent film performances, she appeared alongside Tom Cruise, Mary J. Blige, and Alec Baldwin in the 2012 film Rock of Ages. She also appeared alongside Sandra Bullock and Casey Affleck in Chris Butler and Sam Fell's animated movie Paranorman in that same year as the voice of a Blithe Hollow Townperson. This was her first appearance as a voice in an animated film. Her last film appearance was in 2013, when she made her second appearance as a voice in an animated film, Legends of Oz: Dorothy Returns, starring Lea Michelle and Bernadette Peters.

Since 2013, Faye's career has been focused solely on choreography. In 2013 she choreographed The Oscars, and in 2015 she choreographed an episode of the TV series Kriste. She has also do choreography work in several other films and series since, including Central Intelligence (2016) and episodes of Mary + Jane (2017). In 2023, she was a choreographer for the music video "Heartbeat" by Davina Michelle.

== Projects ==
- Magic Horn – Broadway musical in development: Director/Producer
- Cher's Dressed to Kill tour
- Martha Davis and the Motels – Video: Director
- Davina Michelle: Heartbeat - Music video choreographer – 2023
- Red Notice - Was a choreographer in this film starring Dwayne Johnson and Ryan Reynolds
- Witches - Was a choreographer in the film based on Roald Dahl's book The Witches – 2020
- Ryan Hansen Solves Crime on Television - Choreographed two episodes in Season 4, which included episodes 4 and 8.
- The Ranch - Choreographed one episode of this TV series (Season 2 Episode 7) – 2017
- Mary + Jane - Choreographed Season 1 Episode 10.
- Central Intelligence - Choreographer – 2016
- Steve Wynn birthday extravaganza starring Hugh Jackman – 2014
- Fred and Adele Astaire Awards – Choreographed "All That Jazz" featuring Catherine Zeta-Jones – 2013
- We're the Millers – Film: Choreographed Jennifer Aniston's strip tease, Rawson Marshall Thurber director – 2013
- Kirstie – TV: Choreographer – Kirstie Alley and Michael Richards – 2013
- The Academy Awards – TV: Restaged/Choreographed All That Jazz featuring Catherine Zeta-Jones – 2013
- My Week with Marilyn – Film: Choreographed and Directed Michelle Williams musical numbers – 2011
- Pirates of the Caribbean: On Stranger Tides – Film: Associate Choreographer, Rob Marshall director, John DeLuca choreographer – Johnny Depp, Penélope Cruz – 2011
- Burlesque – Film: Choreographer, Steven Antin director – Cher, Christina Aguilera – 2010
- The American Music Awards – TV: Director/Choreographer of Musical Segment – 2010
- X Factor UK - series finale – TV: Director/Choreographer of Musical Segment – 2010
- Dancing with the Stars – TV: Director/Choreographer of Musical Segment – 2010
- Castle: Choreographer – 2011
- Saving Grace – TV: Choreographer – Holly Hunter – 2009
- Nine – Film: Associate Choreographer, Rob Marshall director/co-choreographer with John DeLuca – Daniel Day-Lewis, Nicole Kidman, Marianne Cotilliard, Penélope Cruz – 2009
- The 59th Primetime Emmy Awards – TV: Associate Choreographer, Rob Marshall/John DeLuca choreographer – 2007
- Tony Bennett: An American Classic – TV: Associate Choreographer, Rob Marshall director/co-choreographer with John DeLuca – Tony Bennett, Barbra Streisand, Christina Aguilera – 2006
- Memoirs of a Geisha – Film: Associate Choreographer, Rob Marshall director, John DeLuca choreographer – Gong Li, Zhang Ziyi – 2005
- Stuart Little 3: Call of the Wild – Video: Choreographer – 2006
- The 75th Annual Academy Awards – TV: Associate Choreographer, Rob Marshall/John DeLuca choreographers – 2003
- Chicago – Film: Associate Choreographer, Rob Marshall director/choreographer – Renee Zellweger, Richard Gere, Catherine Zeta-Jones – 2002
- Annie – Disney TV Movie: Associate Choreographer, Rob Marshall director/choreographer – Alan Cumming, Kristin Chenoweth, Victor Garber – 1999

== Filmography ==
Denise Faye film and television credits
Year	Title	Role	Notes
1988	The Equalizer	Hooker	Episode: "Target of Choice"
1995	Secret Sins	Colleen	Film
1995	Mighty Aphrodite	Greek Chorus	Film
1996	Milk & Money	Kimberly	Film
1997	Donnie Brasco	Mob Girlfriend	Film
1997	Destination Anywhere: The Film	Stripper	Direct-to-video
1997	The Next Step	Heidi	Film
1998	Witness to the Mob	Dawn De Bat	TV movie
1999	Martial Law	Daphne Pierce	Episode: "Breakout"
1999	Game Day	Cassandra	Film
2001	American Pie 2	Danielle	Film
2002	Chicago	Annie	Film. American Choreography Award for Outstanding Achievement in Feature Film; Broadcast Film Critics Association Award for Best Cast; Screen Actors Guild Award for Outstanding Performance by a Cast in a Motion Picture; Nominated—Phoenix Film Critics Society Award for Best Cast
2003	The Drew Carey Show	Susie	Episode: "Turkeyspotting"
2003	George Lopez	Nicole	Episode: "The Cuban Missus Crisis"
2009	Nine	Female Dancer	Film
2010	Burlesque	Preacher	Film
2012	Rock of Ages	Protest Mother #1	Film
2012	Paranorman	Blithe Hollow Townsperson (voice)	Film
2013	Legends of Oz: Dorothy's Return	(Additional Voices)	Film

== Stage credits ==
Title	Year	Role	Production	Notes
Song and Dance	1985	Various roles	Royale Theatre	1985–1986
The Winter's Tale	1989	Ensemble	Joseph Papp Public Theater	
The Winter's Tale	1989	Ensemble	Anspacher Theater	
Jerome Robbins' Broadway	1989	Various roles	Imperial Theatre	1989–1990
Guys and Dolls	1992	Mimi / Doll	Martin Beck Theatre	1992–1995
The Goodbye Girl	1993	Cast of Richard III	Marquis Theatre	
Chronicle of a Death Foretold	1995	Maria	Plymouth Theatre	
Swinging on a Star	1995	Various roles	Music Box Theatre	1995–1996
Filumena	1996	Diana		
Chicago	1996	Liz	Richard Rodgers Theatre	1996–1997
A Madhouse in Goa	1997	Aliki	Second Stage Theater	
Chicago	1997	Liz	Shubert Theatre	1997–2003

== Awards and nominations ==
Award	Year	Category	Nominated work	Result
American Choreography Awards	2002	Outstanding Achievement in Feature Film	Chicago	Won
Broadcast Film Critics Association Awards	2002	Best Cast	Chicago	Won
Phoenix Film Critics Society Awards	2002	Best Cast	Chicago	Nominated
Screen Actors Guild Awards	2002	Outstanding Performance by a Cast in a Motion Picture	Chicago	Won
World Dance Award	2011	Outstanding Choreography Feature Film		Nominated
The Fred and Adele Astaire Awards	2011	Best Choreography in a Feature Film		Nominated
Dance Track Magazine -Artist Award	2011	Best Choreographer Film		Won
