= Kidnapped: In the Line of Duty =

- Screenplay by: Thomas Baum
- Directed by: Bobby Roth
- Starring: Dabney Coleman; Timothy Busfield
- Theme music composer: Christopher Franke
- Country of origin: United States
- Original language: English

Production
- Executive producer: Kenneth Kaufman
- Producer: J. Boyce Harman Jr.
- Production location: Los Angeles
- Cinematography: Shelly Johnson
- Editor: Henk Van Eeghen
- Running time: 90 minutes
- Production companies: Patchett Kaufman Entertainment; World International Network

Original release
- Network: NBC
- Release: March 12, 1995

Kidnapped: In the Line of Duty is a 1995 American television film directed by Bobby Roth and starring Dabney Coleman and Timothy Busfield.

== Cast ==
- Dabney Coleman as Arthur Milo
- Timothy Busfield as Pete Honeycutt
- Lauren Tom as Lily Yee
- Tracey Walter as Oliver Tracy
- Barbara Williams as Beth Honeycutt
- Carmen Argenziano as Buddy Fortune
- Henry G. Sanders as Ellis Watley

== Production ==
Filming occurred in Los Angeles.

== Reception ==
John Ferguson of Radio Times awarded the film three stars out of five.
