= Barbara Williams (actress) =

Canadian-American actress (b. 1953)

- Born: October 19, 1953 (age 72); Vancouver Island, British Columbia, Canada
- Occupation: Actress
- Years active: 1978–present
- Spouses: Nick Mancuso (m. 1987; div. 1993); Tom Hayden (m. 1993; died 2016)

Barbara Williams (born October 19, 1953) is a Canadian-American actress. Williams has starred in the 1984 Paramount film Thief of Hearts, the 1988 film Watchers and the 1992 film Oh, What a Night. She garnered a Genie Award nomination for Best Supporting Actress at the 21st Genie Awards for Love Come Down.

== Early life ==
Williams was born in Vancouver Island, British Columbia, the daughter of Simone and Jack Williams, a tugboat skipper and logger. She is the widow of social and political activist Tom Hayden.

== Filmography ==
=== Film ===
Year	Title	Role	Notes
1981	Firebird 2015 AD	Shana	
1983	Tell Me That You Love Me	Miri	
1984	Thief of Hearts	Mickey Davis	
1986	Jo Jo Dancer, Your Life Is Calling	Dawn	
1988	Tiger Warsaw	Karen	
1988	Watchers	Nora	
1990	The Man Inside	Judie Brandt	
1991	City of Hope	Angela	
1992	Oh, What a Night	Vera	Video
1993	Digger	Anna Corlett	
1997	Inventing the Abbotts	Joan Abbott	
1998	Krippendorf's Tribe	Jennifer Harding Krippendorf	
1998	Bone Daddy	Sharon	
1998	They Come at Night	Dr. Sarah Schaeffer	
2000	Lost Girl	Piano Teacher	Short
2000	Love Come Down	Olive Carter	
2001	Jack the Dog	Faith	
2002	Perfect Pie	Francesca Prine / Marie Beck	
2003	Manhood	Faith	
2005	The Inner Circle	Barbara	
2006	Little Chenier	Bernell	
2013	Hollywood Seagull	Irene Del Mar	
2013	White House Down	Muriel Walker	
2013	I Turned Her to the Left		Short
2016	Take the Reins	Sierra's Mother	Short
2025	Crystal Cross	TBA	

=== Television ===
Year	Title	Role	Notes
1978	All's Well That Ends Well	Widow	TV movie
1979	The Littlest Hobo	Mrs. Rudd	"Smoke"
1982	By Reason of Insanity	Mrs. Devlin	TV movie
1982	Shocktrauma	Nurse Andrea Davidson	TV movie
1985	Alfred Hitchcock Presents	Maggie Verona	"The Human Interest Story"
1986	Stingray	Sister Allison MacKenzie	"That Terrible Swift Sword"
1987	Stingray	Ginny Mitchell	"One Way Ticket to the End of the Line"
1989	The Equalizer	Sylvia Thorton	"Making of a Martyr"
1989	Street Legal	Pat Hardaker	"In Search of a Dream"
1989	Peter Gunn	Edie	TV movie
1990	Neon Rider	Judith	"Father and Son"
1990	Against the Law	Phoebe Haverhill McHeath	"Pilot"
1991	Tropical Heat	Philomena	"Fowl Play"
1991	The Hidden Room	Claire McIntire	"Let Death Do Us Part"
1991	Keeper of the City	Grace	TV movie
1992	Quiet Killer	Charlene	TV movie
1992	Indecency	Marie Clarkson	TV movie
1993	Country Estates	Sarah Reed	TV movie
1993	Spenser: Ceremony	Susan Silverman	TV movie
1993	Star Trek: The Next Generation	Anna	"Liaisons"
1994	Spenser: Pale Kings and Princes	Susan Silverman	TV movie
1994	Picket Fences	Vera Keegan	"Cold Spell"
1995	Kidnapped: In the Line of Duty	Beth Honeycutt	TV movie
1995	The Outer Limits	Caitlin Doyle	"Under the Bed"
1995	Family of Cops	Kate Fein	TV movie
1996	Mother Trucker: The Diana Kilmury Story	Diana Kilmury	TV movie
1997	Breach of Faith: A Family of Cops II	Kate Fein	TV movie
1997	Millennium	Dawn	"Paper Dove"
1997	Joe Torre: Curveballs Along the Way	Ali Torre	TV movie
1998	Sins of the City	Sam Richardson	"Sins of the City", "Blind Eye for Hire", "Quarry"
1998	Naked City: Justice with a Bullet	Eva	TV movie
1998	Naked City: A Killer Christmas	Eva	TV movie
1999	Family of Cops III: Under Suspicion	Kate Fein	TV movie
2002	CSI: Crime Scene Investigation	Diane Logan	"The Finger"
2006	Bones	Barbara Harper	"Judas on a Pole"
2008	Quarterlife	Maggie	"Pilot", "Compromise"
2008	Every Second Counts	Helen Preston	TV movie
2009-10	FlashForward	VP Joyce Clemente	"Gimme Some Truth", "Let No Man Put Asunder"
2012	Revenge	District Attorney	"Justice"
2012	Rookie Blue	Claire McNally	"Messy Houses", "Coming Home", "I Never"
2018	Mayans M.C.	Alice Reed	"Murcielago/Zotz"
2019	Another Life	General Blair Dubois	Main Role
