= Dead Solid Perfect =

1988 film by Bobby Roth

- Genre: Drama; Sport
- Based on: Dead Solid Perfect by Dan Jenkins
- Written by: Bobby Roth
- Directed by: Bobby Roth
- Starring: Randy Quaid; Kathryn Harrold; Jack Warden; Corinne Bohrer; Brett Cullen
- Music by: Tangerine Dream
- Country of origin: United States
- Original language: English

Production
- Producer: Bill Badalato
- Production locations: Dallas; Fort Worth; Santa Barbara, California
- Cinematography: Tim Suhrstedt
- Running time: 93 minutes
- Production company: HBO Pictures

Original release
- Network: HBO
- Release: December 18, 1988

Dead Solid Perfect is a 1988 American film following the life of a professional golfer on the PGA Tour. It was produced by HBO films and based on the 1974 novel of the same name by Dan Jenkins and written and directed by Bobby Roth.

== Cast ==
- Randy Quaid as Kenny Lee
- Kathryn Harrold as Beverly T. Lee
- Jack Warden as Hubert "Bad Hair" Wimberly
- Corinne Bohrer as Janie Rimmer
- Brett Cullen as Donny Smithern
- Larry Riley as Spec
- DeLane Matthews as Katie Beth Smithern
- John M. Jackson as Grover Scomer
- Bibi Besch as Rita
- Billy Akin as Donny's Caddy
- Linda Dona as Blonde
- John Durbin as Man
- Kate Finlayson as Writer
- Bob Harrison as Himself
- Ron Hayes as Official
- Peter Jacobsen as Himself
- Dixie K. Wade as Nedra
- Michael Laskin as Associate Producer
- Frank Li'Bay as Walter
- Burr Middleton as 1st Official
- Lindy Miller as Himself
- Don Morrow as Golf Commentator
- Richardson Morse as 2nd Official
- Rob Nilsson as Writer #2
- Mac O'Grady as Himself
- Keith Olbermann as Golf Commentator
- Annie O'Neill as Vera
- Dan Priest as Official
- Kate Rodger as Shapely Adorable (credited as Kathleen Rodger)
- R.J. Rudolph as Dr. Bernie Glatzer (credited as Dick Rudolph)
- Henry G. Sanders as TV Director
- David Schickele as The Bartender
- Julie Simone as Fan
- Bill Smillie as Official
- Ann Walker as Waitress
- Chris Adamec as Overzealous Fan (uncredited)
- James Andrew Clark as Spectator (uncredited)
- Riley Roden as Teenage Boy (uncredited)
- Dan Jenkins as Hotel Guest (uncredited cameo)

== Soundtrack ==
Dead Solid Perfect

Soundtrack album by Tangerine Dream
- Released: 1991
- Recorded: 1988
- Genre: Electronic
- Label: Silva Screen
- Producer: Tangerine Dream

Tangerine Dream chronology
Canyon Dreams (1991)	Dead Solid Perfect (1991)	The Park Is Mine (1991)

Dead Solid Perfect is the fifteenth soundtrack album by Tangerine Dream and their forty-first overall. It was recorded in 1988 but not released until 1991.

No.	Title	Length
1.	"Theme from "Dead Solid Perfect""	3:20
2.	"In the Pond"	1:15
3.	"Beverly Leaves"	0:59
4.	"Of Cads and Caddies"	2:12
5.	"Tournament Montage"	2:38
6.	"A Whore in One"	2:13
7.	"Sand Trap"	1:21
8.	"In the Rough"	0:42
9.	"Nine Iron"	1:38
10.	"U.S. Open"	1:40
11.	"My Name Is Bad Hair"	2:31
12.	"In the Hospital Room"	0:36
13.	"Welcome to Bushwood/Golfus Interruptus"	1:32
14.	"Deja Vu (I've Heard This Before!)"	1:31
15.	"Birdie"	1:20
16.	"Divot"	1:18
17.	"Kenny and Donny Montage"	1:40
18.	"Off to See Beverly"	0:32
19.	"Phone to Beverly"	1:19
20.	"Nice Shots"	2:42
21.	"Sinking Putts"	2:04
22.	"Kenny's Winning Shot"	1:06

== Home media ==
HBO Video didn't issue the film until 1993, when Warner Home Video released it on VHS. To date, Dead Solid Perfect has not been released on DVD or Blu-ray.
