= Laura Jordan (actress) =

Canadian actress

- Born: Laura Jordan; April 10, 1977 (age 49); Toronto, Ontario, Canada
- Other name: Laura Lise Jordan
- Occupation: Actress
- Years active: 2001–present

Laura Jordan (born April 10, 1977) is a Canadian actress.

== Biography ==
Born in Toronto, Ontario, Canada, Jordan lived in France for three years where she studied French at the University of Paris. She moved from Toronto to Los Angeles on a whim with her best friend & fellow actor, Malin Åkerman in 2002.

Jordan played Sadie in the 2005 film Berkeley. In 2008, she played Kayla Scott in Joy Ride 2: Dead Ahead, a sequel to Joy Ride (2001). Jordan played Madeline Maguire on the 2009 TV series Shattered.

She plays in a band called The Billionaires based out of Los Angeles.

== Filmography ==
Year	Title	Role	Notes
2001	Degrassi: The Next Generation	Soap Opera Woman	TV series - in the episode "Coming of Age"
2003	Final Draft	Alison	
2003	Naked Hotel		TV movie
2003	Playmakers	August	TV series - 4 episodes
2004	Camp Hollywood	Herself	TV movie
2005	Berkeley	Sadie	
2005	Pure	Misha	
2006	The Night of the White Pants	Felicia Exall	
2006	Brothers & Sisters	Fawn	TV series - 3 episodes
2006	Three	Samantha	
2006	Frisky Dingo	voice	TV series - in the episode "Flowers for Near"
2007	Without a Trace	Abby Horton	TV series - in the episode "Primed"
2007	The Red Chalk	Monster	
2007	Solstice		
2008	Joy Ride 2: Dead Ahead	Kayla Scott	Direct to video
2009	The Twenty	Becky	
2009	Shattered	Madeline Maguire	TV series (pilot)
