= Bone Daddy =

- Original poster art
- Written by: Tom Szollosi
- Directed by: Mario Azzopardi
- Starring: Rutger Hauer; Barbara Williams
- Music by: Christophe Beck; Mark Kilian
- Original language: English

Production
- Executive producer: Stephen Ujlaki
- Producers: Lewis Chesler; Jean Desormeaux
- Cinematography: Danny Nowak
- Editor: Dean Balser
- Production companies: Artisan Entertainment; The Kushner-Locke Company

Original release
- Release: June 19, 1998

Bone Daddy is a 1998 Canadian–American crime thriller film directed by Mario Azzopardi and starring Rutger Hauer and Barbara Williams. In it, a forensics expert turned novelist is challenged by the perpetrator of the real-life crimes he used for inspiration, a serial killer who robs his victims of their bones while they are still alive. In Canada, the film was released as Palmer's Bones. It was commissioned by HBO for broadcast as part of its "Friday World Premiere" collection in the U.S.

== Plot ==
Rocky Carlson, the agent of novelist Bill Palmer, gets assaulted in his Chicago hotel room by an unknown figure. Palmer's best seller Bone Daddy is a heavily fictionalized version of a series of real, unsolved murders that took place in the city, about which Palmer gained insider knowledge on his previous job as chief medical examiner. Bill and his PR man visit Rocky's room. It is unoccupied, but they discover a human finger bone. Palmer is allowed to serve as consultant on the investigation and is assigned to reluctant police officer Sharon Hewlitt. The two head to a party celebrating the appointment of Bill's son Peter to his father's former position of chief medical examiner, but it is cut short when lower leg bones are found inside a gift box, accompanied by a message reading "Here's your agent. Bone Daddy". Forensic examination reveals that the bones were removed from a still alive Ricky, and more bones are shown being surgically removed from him.

Hewlitt reviews archives and finds out about one-time suspect Dr. Morten Franz, then Bill's assistant. Another medical examiner, Marshall Stone, tells Hewlitt that Franz had a professional and personal rivalry with Bill, who had an affair with Franz's wife. Bill later compounded Franz's disgrace when he made his book's fictional killer a medical examiner. The next day, Peter's children find a tibia on the hood of the family's car, and Palmer is further taunted by a phone call from the "Bone Daddy", who says he will next target Hewlitt. He manages to record some of it. Hewlitt finds Rocky's body outside her home just as Palmer arrives. Hewlitt and Palmer head to Franz's home but finds him greatly diminished by his downfall, for which his son Mort Jr. blames Bill.

Peter's house is found ransacked and empty. While searching the premises, Bill and Hewlitt come across newspaper clippings about the Bone Daddy and a copy of the novel, which is missing identical pages to those wrapping the bones sent by the killer. Palmer heads to the morgue and compares the stitches on Rocky's corpse to Peter's work. They do not match, but those on another body do. Meanwhile, Hewlitt and a specialist de-scramble the voice from the Bone Daddy's call to Bill. They identify Marshall Stone as the killer, who took Bill's inaccurate account of his crimes as an affront. As he is about to hurt Peter, Bill and Hewlitt barge in, and a struggle ensues. Hewlitt shoots Stone, and he falls into a deadly pit before reinforcements show up to seal the crime scene.

== Cast ==
- Rutger Hauer as Palmer
- Barbara Williams as Sharon
- R. H. Thomson as Stone
- Joseph Kell as Peter
- Robin Gammell as Cobb
- Blu Mankuma as Trent
- Mimi Kuzyk as Kim
- Wayne Best as Rodman
- Daniel Kash as Rocky
- Peter Keleghan as Tarnower
- Kirsten Bishop as Leslie
- Kyra Azzopardi as Mark
- Michael Caruana as Hurwitz
- Dean McDermott as Mort Jr.

== Production ==
Although set in Chicago, Bone Daddy was largely filmed in Toronto, Ontario, Canada. Local outfit Chesler/Perlmutter Productions partnered with the U.S.-based Kushner/Locke Company, who also handled international sales. At the time of filming, it had already been pre-bought by HBO for slotting into its Friday World Premiere lineup. Photography extended from November 19 to December 13, 1997. During the shoot, it was assessed that the film was likely to end up too short to satisfy the channel's contractual demands, so production begrudgingly added one day to the schedule. This lengthened the feature by two or three minutes without causing it to drag, in Hauer's opinion. However, it still came in slightly short in the end. On December 7, stars Rutger Hauer and Barbara Williams took a break from the shoot to give a joint stage performance at Toronto jazz club Dark City, with Hauer reading works by Leonard Cohen and Sylvia Plath, while Williams sang material from her album Forgiving Ocean.

== Release ==
=== Television ===
In the U.S., Bone Daddy premiered on premium cable channel HBO on June 19, 1998.

=== Home video ===
In the U.S., the film debuted on VHS on December 15, 1998, from distributor Artisan Entertainment.

== Reception ==
Bone Daddy received mixed reviews. Ballantine Books' Video Movie Guide called it a "grisly made-for-cable thriller" but deemed that "[t]he prerequisite shocks [...] are not nearly enough back story to make much of this or the characters matter. Sister publications TV Guide and Motion Picture Annual found that "[t]he convincingly grisly makeup effects do elicit a few shivers—certainly more than Mario Azzopardi's direction, which relies too much on [...] worn-out conventions". Robert Cettl, author of the book Serial Killer Cinema: An Analytical Filmography, noted the characters' complex relationships, writing that "all operate from a clouded motive" and added that "the film is competently stylized in the manner of Seven and Bone Collector".
