= The Man Inside (1990 film) =

- Directed by: Bobby Roth
- Written by: Bobby Roth; Günter Wallraff
- Starring: Jürgen Prochnow
- Cinematography: Ricardo Aronovich
- Music by: Tangerine Dream
- Distributed by: New Line Cinema
- Release date: October 26, 1990
- Running time: 93 mins.
- Country: United States
- Language: English
- Budget: $3.8 million

The Man Inside is a 1990 American drama film directed by Bobby Roth. It stars Jürgen Prochnow and Peter Coyote. It was nominated for a Mystfest award in 1990.

== Cast ==
- Jürgen Prochnow as Günter Wallraff
- Peter Coyote as Henry Tobel
- Nathalie Baye as Christine
- Dieter Laser as Leonard Schroeter
- Monique van de Ven as Tina Wallraff
- Philip Anglim as Rolf Gruel
- Henry G. Sanders as Evans
- James Laurenson as Mueller
- Sylvie Granotier as Kathy Heller
- Hippolyte Girardot as Rudolph Schick
- Joe Sheridan as Karl
- Philippe Leroy as Borges (credited as Philippe Leroy Beaulieu)
- Christine Murillo as Angela
- Barbara Williams as Judie Brandt
- Florence Pernel as Angel
- Gert Haucke as Heinz Herbert Schultz
- Günter Meisner as Judge

== Soundtrack ==
L'Affaire Wallraff (The Man Inside)

Soundtrack album by Tangerine Dream
- Released: December 1991
- Recorded: 1989
- Genre: Electronic
- Label: EMI France
- Producers: Edgar Froese; Paul Haslinger

Tangerine Dream chronology
The Park Is Mine (1991)	L'Affaire Wallraff (The Man Inside) (1991)	Rumpelstiltskin (1991)

L'Affaire Wallraff (The Man Inside) is the seventeenth soundtrack album by Tangerine Dream and their forty-third overall.

All tracks are written by Edgar Froese and Paul Haslinger.

No.	Title	Length
1.	"Wallraff's Theme"	1:36
2.	"Tendency of Love"	3:58
3.	"Addicted to the Truth"	4:35
4.	"World of the "Standard""	4:10
5.	"Purposes of Brevity"	4:30
6.	"Tobel's Death by the River"	4:22
7.	"Taboo Society"	3:17
8.	"The Drive to Hanover"	4:40
9.	"Correlation of Lies"	3:45
10.	"Investigation"	4:16
11.	"News and Morality"	4:45

== Reception ==
On review aggregator website Rotten Tomatoes, the film holds an approval rating of 13% based on 8 reviews, with an average rating of 4.3/10.
