= Merlin and the War of the Dragons =

- Directed by: Mark Atkins
- Written by: Jon Macy
- Produced by: David Michael Latt; David Rimawi; Paul Bales
- Starring: Simon Lloyd Roberts; Jürgen Prochnow; Hefin Wyn
- Cinematography: Mark Atkins
- Distributed by: The Asylum
- Release date: November 25, 2008
- Running time: 90 minutes
- Countries: United Kingdom; United States
- Language: English

Merlin and the War of the Dragons is a 2008 fantasy film produced by The Asylum, based loosely on the legends of King Arthur. It was filmed entirely on location in Wales.

== Plot ==
In Pre-England Britain, before the birth of King Arthur, Merlin serves under King Vortigern.

Soon after Vortigern's coronation, fire-breathing dragons land in Britain, setting fire to buildings and eating its inhabitants. The dragons threaten the existence of Britain, and Vortigern instructs Merlin to lead an army against the dragons, ordering his best generals, Hengist and Uther to aid Merlin.

Merlin plots to defeat the dragons and defeats them using magic and knowledge.

== Cast ==
- Nia Ann - Lady Nimue
- Ceri Bostock - Gwyneth
- Carys Eleri - Lady Vivianne
- Ruthie Gwilym - Midwife
- William Huw - Torm
- Dylan Jones - Uther
- Iago McGuire - Hengist
- Jürgen Prochnow - The Mage
- Simon Lloyd Roberts - Merlin
- Joseph Stacey - Vendiger
- Iona Thonger - Ingraine
- Hefin Wyn - Vortigern

== Reception ==
”The acting in the movie wasn’t so bad, with veteran Prochnow leading the way and young Simon Lloyd Roberts doing a commendable job as a young Merlin, though Iago MacGuire was a tad too sniveling for my taste. But the biggest problem with this film is that it’s probably far to talky with its overreaching plot and as such it gets way to tedious to watch at times. It almost saves itself in the last ten minutes or so with all of the dragon battles and sword fights it tosses at us, but to get to that point with the characters really not being all that interesting to watch, it takes some effort to make to this point.”, wrote Christopher Armstead.

A review at BluRay.com called it ”another miserable low-budget Merlin movie.”

== See also ==
- Merlin – A BBC television series premiering in the same year, which also tells of Merlin's early years
