= Forbidden (1984 film) =

- Directed by: Anthony Page
- Screenplay by: Leonard Gross (teleplay)
- Based on: book The Last Jews in Berlin
- Produced by: Mark Forstater; Hans Brockman; Gerald I. Isenberg; Ingrid Windisch
- Starring: Jacqueline Bisset; Jürgen Prochnow; Irene Worth
- Narrated by: Jacqueline Bisset
- Cinematography: Wolfgang Treu
- Edited by: Thomas Schwalm
- Music by: Tangerine Dream
- Production companies: Mark Forstater Productions; HBO Premiere Films
- Distributed by: Telepictures
- Release date: December 1984
- Running time: 114 minutes 157 minutes (Canada)
- Countries: England; West Germany
- Language: English

Forbidden is a 1984 drama film directed by Anthony Page and starring Jacqueline Bisset, Jürgen Prochnow and Irene Worth. The plot is inspired by the life of Maria von Maltzan originally told in the non-fiction book The Last Jews in Berlin by Leonard Gross about a countess who hides her Jewish boyfriend in her apartment in World War II. It was a co-production between the UK and West Germany. It was broadcast on television in the US, but released in cinemas in other countries.

== Plot ==
German countess Nina von Halder is a student in veterinary medicine in Berlin, Germany on the eve of World War II. Ostracised by her family due to her liberal views and opposition to the Nazi government, she lives alone, independent and strong-willed. The film opens with Nina studying at the library the day Germany invades Poland. She is angered and tells a classmate she knows the reasons Hitler gave for the invasion (to allegedly rescue ethnic Germans from Polish oppression) are a pack of lies.

One day while on errands Nina witnesses two Hitler Youth boys attacking a vendor. She also sees a man attempting to help the vendor. She confronts them and demands to know why he is being attacked. They say they beat him because he sells to Jews. She tells them to leave the man alone or she will report them to her brother-in-law, a high-ranking officer. Later, while attending an informal party hosted by her friend, she recognises the man who came to the assistance of the vendor. Her friend, Erica, tells her that his name is Fritz Friedlaender and he is a writer. She is immediately attracted to him, but Erica warns Nina that it would be illegal to date him under the Nuremberg Laws because he is Jewish. The headstrong Nina ignores this advice, however, and begins a relationship with him.

When he returns home from a walk, he finds Nina desperately waiting for him. He tells her what happened on his walk. She has worse news for him; the Resistance has discovered that the Nazis are taking the Jews to concentration death camps in occupied Poland and gassing them. She still believes his mother is still safe in Theresienstadt. She then tells him about a train going to Switzerland. She and her friends are smuggling several Jews on board. She professes her love for him, but wants him to go where he will be safe. That night, they go to the railway depot, where he and other refugees are placed in boxes with a small supply of food and water. As she leaves, she sees Fritz running up to her; he loves her so much that he's unable to leave her. Together they return home.

During the war's closing months, Germany is invaded by the Soviet Union in 1945. Nina knows that the Russians want revenge for the millions of their countrymen murdered by the Third Reich. Attempting to hide in the cellar, they are caught by the Russians and forced outside. Nina yells to the soldiers that Fritz is Jewish, but they ignore her. Once outside, Fritz is forced to kneel as the Russians prepare to shoot him. He starts singing "Shema Israel". The Russian soldier lowers his gun and says that he is Jewish too. During the voice-over while the camera pans over a bombed-out and devastated Berlin, Nina tells the audience that Ruth Friedlaender is eventually transferred from Theresienstadt to Auschwitz, where she is gassed. Eventually Nina and Fritz marry; in her narration she tells the audience that Fritz died in 1974.

== See also ==
- List of Holocaust films
