= Bobby Roth =

American film director

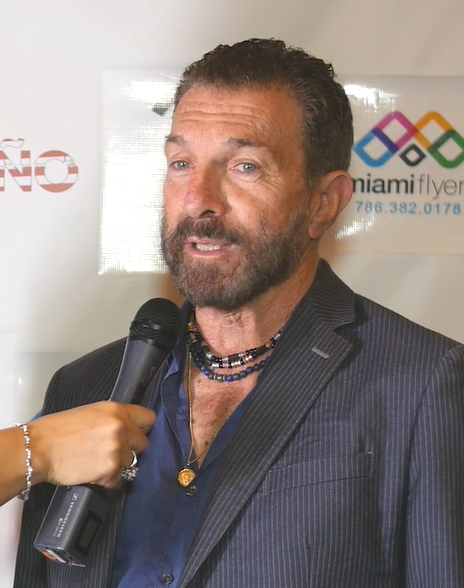
- Roth in 2018
- Born: Robert Jay Roth; 1950 (age 75–76); Los Angeles, California, U.S.
- Occupations: Film director, producer, writer
- Years active: 1976–present
- Spouses: Leslie Tobin Bacon; Pamela Springsteen (m. 2002)
- Children: 2, including Nick

Robert Jay Roth (born 1950) is an American television and film director, screenwriter and producer.

== Life and career ==
Born and raised in Los Angeles, Roth began his tertiary education at the University of California, Berkeley studying philosophy and creative writing before earning his Bachelor of Arts degree in Cinema at the University of Southern California in 1972. He continued his education at the University of California, Los Angeles enrolling in the Master of Fine Arts program and received his graduate degree in motion picture production in 1975.^{[1]} The following year, he wrote, produced and directed his first film, Independence Day. His 1984 film Heartbreakers was entered into the 35th Berlin International Film Festival.^{[2]} In 1988, Roth wrote and directed the television film Dead Solid Perfect.

Over the course of his career, Roth has written, produced, and directed several television and feature films and episodes. Television series he has worked on include: Miami Vice, Beverly Hills, 90210, Dr. Quinn, Medicine Woman, Numb3rs, Commander in Chief, Without a Trace, New Amsterdam, Raising the Bar, Criminal Minds, Prison Break, Lost, FlashForward, Fringe, Life Unexpected, V, The Mentalist, Revenge, Breakout Kings, Agents of S.H.I.E.L.D., Grey's Anatomy, Scorpion, Hawaii 5-0, Player and the 2017 reboot of MacGyver among many more.

He was a founding member of the Independent Feature Project and the first co-chairman of the DGA's Independent Feature Committee. His films have won many awards and have been exhibited in over 100 international film festivals. He also teaches film seminars throughout the world and is the recipient of the 2017 Miami Web Fest Lifetime Achievement Award.

== Television ==
Year	Title	Network	Ref.
1984	Miami Vice	NBC	
1985	The Insiders	ABC	
1986	Crime Story	NBC	
1992	Beverly Hills, 90210	Fox	
1992	Summer (pilot)	CBS	
1995/96	Dr. Quinn, Medicine Woman	CBS	
1997	The Profiler	NBC	
1998	Vengeance Unlimited	ABC	
2001	Going to California	Showtime	
2001/2	The Division	Lifetime	
2002	Boomtown	NBC	
2002	Girls Club	Fox	
2003	Hack	CBS	
2003	John Doe	Fox	
2004/5	Blind Justice	ABC	
2005	Numbers	CBS	
2005/6	Prison Break	Fox	
2005/6	Commander-in-Chief	ABC	
2006	Lincoln Height	ABC Family	
2006	Vanished	Fox	
2006	Without a Trace	CBS	
2006/7	Prison Break	Fox	
2007	Lost	ABC	
2007	Prison Break	Fox	
2007	New Amsterdam	Fox	
2007	Without a Trace	CBS	
2008	Criminal Minds	CBS	
2008	Raising the Bar	TNT	
2008	Prison Break	Fox	
2008	Shattered (pilot)	Global	
2008-2009	Lost	ABC	
2009	Prison Break	Fox	
2009	Fringe	Fox	
2009	FlashForward	ABC	
2009	Happy Town	ABC	
2009	Lost	ABC	
2010	Flash Forward	ABC	
2010	V	ABC	
2010	Life Unexpected	CW	
2011	The Mentalist	CBS	
2011	Revenge	ABC	
2011	Breakout Kings	A&E	
2012	The Lying Game	ABC Family	
2012	Revenge	ABC	
2012	The Lying Game	ABC Family	
2012	Revenge	ABC	
2012	Mistresses	ABC	
2012	Beauty & the Beast	CW	
2013	Revenge	ABC	
2013	Grey's Anatomy	ABC	
2013	Revenge	ABC	
2013	Agents of S.H.I.E.L.D.	ABC	
2013-14	Grey's Anatomy	ABC	
2014-15	Agents of S.H.I.E.L.D.	ABC	
2014-15	Scorpion	CBS	
2014	Revenge	ABC	
2015-16	Hawaii Five-0	CBS	
2015	Player	NBC	
2016	Of Kings and Prophets	ABC	
2016-17	MacGyver	CBS	
2017	The Last Ship	TNT	
2019	V Wars	Amazon	

== Television films ==
Year	Title	Network	Ref.
1986	Tonight's the Night	ABC	
1987	The Man Who Fell to Earth	ABC	
1988	Baja Oklahoma	HBO	
1988	Dead Solid Perfect	HBO	
1990	Rainbow Drive	Showtime	
1992	Keeper of the City	Showtime	
1992	The Switch	CBS	
1993	Judgment Day: The John List Story	CBS	
1993	Ride with the Wind	ABC	
1994	Nowhere to Hide	ABC	
1994	Kidnapped: In the Line of Duty	NBC	
1995	Naomi & Wynonna: Love Can Build a Bridge	NBC	
1996	Tell Me No Secrets	ABC	
1997	The Inheritance	CBS	
1997	The Devil's Child	ABC	
1998	Her Own Rules	CBS	
1999	A Secret Affair	CBS	
1999	A Holiday Romance	CBS	
2000	Dancing at the Harvest Moon	CBS	
2001	Crossed-Over	CBS	
2003	A Date with Darkness: The Trial and Capture of Andrew Luster	Lifetime	
2003	The Elizabeth Smart Story	CBS	
2004	Brave New Girl	ABC Family	
2010	Reviving Ophelia	Lifetime	
2011	The Killing Game	Lifetime	

== Selected features ==
- Circle of Power (1983)
- Heartbreakers (1984)
- Dead Solid Perfect (1988)
- The Man Inside (1990)
- Jack the Dog (2001)
- Manhood (2003)
- Berkeley (2005)
- Pearl (2020)
