= Dancing at the Harvest Moon =

- Mabius and Bissett in film poster
- Based on: Dancing at the Harvest Moon by K.C. McKinnon
- Teleplay by: Peter Nelson
- Directed by: Bobby Roth
- Starring: Jacqueline Bisset; Eric Mabius; Valerie Harper
- Theme music composer: Christopher Franke
- Country of origin: United States
- Original language: English

Production
- Producer: Salli Newman
- Cinematography: Eric Van Haren Noman
- Editor: Margaret Guinee
- Running time: 84 minutes
- Production companies: Bayonne Entertainment; Sony Pictures Television

Original release
- Network: CBS
- Release: October 20, 2002

Dancing at the Harvest Moon is a 2002 American made-for-television romantic drama film starring Jacqueline Bisset, Valerie Harper and Eric Mabius. Directed by Bobby Roth, it is based on K.C. McKinnon's novel of the same name. The film premiered on October 20, 2002 on CBS.

== Plot ==
Maggie, a professor of English literature, is fast approaching her silver wedding anniversary. But her world is shattered upon discovering that her husband, Tom, has been repeatedly adulterous during their marriage and now intends to marry his younger mistress. Facing divorce, she retreats to the tranquility of her hometown, where she met her first love, Patrick, decades earlier. Patrick has long since died, and the club where they danced together—the Harvest Moon—is closed and in disrepair. She seizes upon the idea of buying and restoring the club again—with the help of a young carpenter/woodworker, John, who turns out to be Patrick's son. Soon the attraction between John and Maggie is hard to deny. However, Maggie can't stop thinking of the obstacles between them, including his young age, his current girlfriend and, most critically, whether her feelings for John are sincere or only a projection of her long-ago love for his father. All is finally revealed once the Harvest Moon is open again.

== Cast ==
- Jacqueline Bisset as Maggie Weber
  - Kristen Kerr as Young Maggie
- Eric Mabius as John Keats Fleming
- Susan Anspach as Julia
- Nan Martin as Harriet Finnigan
- Eugene Roche as Gil Finnigan
- Nick Mancuso as Tom Webber
- Carmen Argenziano as Paul Stanton
- Bonnie Root as Diane Webber
- Valerie Harper as Claire
- Cari Shayne as Amy
- Rob Nilsson as Dean Jim Rogers
- Navi Rawat as Jennifer
- Gina Gallego as TV Anchor
- Josh Holland as Patrick

== Reception ==
Andy Webb from The Movie Scene gave the film three out of five stars and wrote: "What this all boils down to is that "Dancing at the Harvest Moon" is pretty much what you would expect from a made for TV romantic melodrama with lots of soft focus, romantic scenes and not a great amount of depth. But it is enjoyable with a nice take on the age difference relationship scenario with an added element to make it a little less obvious." David Parkinson from Radio Times gave it two out of five stars, stating: "KC McKinnon's bestseller is the source for this lachrymose melodrama, in which Jacqueline Bisset proves once again that she lacks the intensity and range of contemporaries like Charlotte Rampling."
