= Keeper of the City =

1991 television film directed by Bobby Roth

- Genre: Action; Crime; Thriller
- Written by: Gerald Di Pego
- Directed by: Bobby Roth
- Starring: Louis Gossett Jr. Anthony LaPaglia; Peter Coyote
- Music by: Leonard Rosenman
- Country of origin: United States
- Original language: English

Production
- Producer: Bill McCutchen
- Production location: Chicago
- Cinematography: Shelly Johnson
- Editor: Henk Van Eeghen
- Running time: 96 minutes
- Production company: Viacom Pictures

Original release
- Network: Showtime
- Release: January 25, 1992

Keeper of the City is a 1992 American made-for-television crime-action film directed by Bobby Roth and starring Louis Gossett Jr., Anthony LaPaglia and Peter Coyote. It originally premiered on Showtime on January 25, 1992.

== Cast ==
- Louis Gossett Jr. as Detective James Dela
- Anthony LaPaglia as Vince Benedetto
- Peter Coyote as Frank Nordhall
- Renée Soutendijk as Vickie Benedetto
- Tony Todd as Bridger
- Barbara Williams as Grace
- Richard Riehle as Captain Walder
- John Putch as Mitch
- Gina Gallego as Elena
- Tony Plana as Killer

== Reception ==
Kevin Thomas of The Los Angeles Times it was too "conventional for the big screen but satisfying on the tube because it has been done well. Performances are sharp, especially Gossett 's multidimensional cop. Ever the resourceful craftsman, Roth and his cinematographer, Shelly Johnson, did a good job of matching establishing shots filmed in Chicago with L.A. area locales. Keeper of the City benefits, too, from a fine Leonard Rosenman score.
