= Joy Ride 2: Dead Ahead =

2008 film directed by Louis Morneau

- Official DVD cover
- Directed by: Louis Morneau
- Written by: James Robert Johnston; Bennett Yellin
- Based on: Characters by J. J. Abrams; Clay Tarver
- Produced by: Connie Dolphin
- Starring: Nicki Aycox; Nick Zano; Kyle Schmid; Laura Jordan
- Cinematography: Robert C. New; Scott Williams
- Edited by: Mike Jackson
- Music by: Joe Kraemer
- Production company: JR Canada Productions
- Distributed by: 20th Century Fox Home Entertainment
- Release date: October 7, 2008
- Running time: 91 minutes
- Country: United States
- Language: English

Joy Ride 2: Dead Ahead is a 2008 American direct-to-video horror film and the sequel to Joy Ride (2001). The film was directed by Louis Morneau and stars Nicki Aycox, Nick Zano, Kyle Schmid, Laura Jordan and Mark Gibbon. The film was released on DVD on October 7, 2008. It was followed by a sequel, Joy Ride 3: Roadkill (2014).

== Plot ==
Melissa Scott and her fiancé Bobby Lawrence are on a cross country road trip to Las Vegas to get married. Joining them for the ride is Melissa's sister Kayla and Kayla's online boyfriend Nik.

During the trip, their car breaks down in the desert. Whilst looking for help, the four find a seemingly abandoned barn, in which they find a silver 1971 Chevrolet Chevelle in working order with a full tank of gas. The four reluctantly steal the car, although Melissa leaves a note in the house with her contact details for the owner of the car to find.

The next day, Melissa receives a phone call from Rusty Nail. He refers to Melissa as "Goldilocks", revealing that he can see her, and Bobby soon disappears from a diner restroom. The others find a CB radio in the car, through which Rusty Nail orders them to destroy their cellphones and obey his orders if Bobby is to survive. He requests for Kayla to cut off her middle finger, mirroring an earlier incident when she had flipped off a trucker who turned out to be Rusty himself. The group heads to a mortuary hospital, where Kayla cuts a finger from a corpse, but Rusty, knowing they have broken the rules, cuts off Bobby's finger and puts it in the glove compartment of the Chevelle, where it is eventually discovered by the group.

Rusty soon pulls up at a bar in Utah, and Bobby tries to escape. He gains the attention of a bartender, who tries to help out, but Rusty catches him in the act and kills the bartender. Nik is kidnapped by Rusty, and Melissa and Kayla chase them in the Chevelle. However, Rusty manages to ram the car several times in his truck, flipping the Chevelle over. Melissa manages to escape, but Kayla gets trapped and is killed after Rusty plows into the car again.

Rusty takes Bobby and Nik back to his home and sadistically tortures them, eventually killing Nik by impaling a steel bar through his head. Melissa, meanwhile, breaks into a police station and steals a motor bike, racing off to find Bobby. She eventually tracks Rusty down, and, after using the motor bike as a distraction, beats Rusty down with a shovel. She drives away in his truck, with Bobby locked in the trailer, but the trailer disconnects and leaves Bobby behind. Rusty manages to grab on to the side of the truck and climb on the roof. A scuffle ensues, in which Melissa manages to jump out of the truck right before it goes flying off of the edge of the cliff, upon where it explodes on impact. Bobby escapes from the trailer and meets back up with Melissa.

Later, Rusty is revealed to have miraculously survived the explosion after he picks up a girl whose car has broken down.

== Cast ==
- Nicki Aycox as Melissa Scott
- Nick Zano as Bobby Lawrence
- Laura Jordan as Kayla Scott
- Kyle Schmid as Nick "Nik" Parker
- Mark Gibbon as Rusty Nail
- Krystal Vrba as Lot Lizard
- Kathryn Kirkpatrick as Big Wheels Waitress
- Rob Carpenter as Trucker #1
- Gordon Tipple as Trucker #2
- Rebecca Davis as Woman Stuck In Snow
- Daniel Boileau as Bald Trucker
- Lyle St. Goddard as Kenny Chesney (credited as Goofy Looking Truck Driver)
- Mackenzie Gray as The Bartender
- Sean Tyson as Drunk Trucker #1
- Chris Kalhoon as Drunk Trucker #2
- Gardiner Millar as The Mortician
- Colette Hills as Female Corpse

== Development ==
Originally titled Joy Ride 2: End of the Road in promotional artwork, Joy Ride 2: Dead Ahead was filmed in British Columbia, Canada, at Cache Creek, Kamloops and Vancouver.

Like the original film, Joy Ride 2: Dead Ahead was produced and distributed by 20th Century Fox Home Entertainment, although unlike the original it was direct-to-DVD.

== Release ==
The film was released on DVD on October 7, 2008 in the United States and opened at #9 at the DVD sales chart, making $1,492,635 off 62,000 sold DVD units. As per the latest figures, 200,000 units have been sold, translating to $4,307,361 in revenue. This does not include Blu-ray sales/DVD rentals.

== Reception ==
A Dread Central review says, "2001's Joy Ride remains in my opinion one of the most underrated thrillers of recent years. While it had a smart script (co-written by J.J. Abrams no less) that put more emphasis on psychological torment than that of the physical variety, Joy Ride 2: Dead Ahead keeps the cruel mind games but puts a greater emphasis on physical pain and suffering. Though the original established that the mysterious psycho trucker Rusty Nail was capable of extreme brutality, the anguish he inflicted was primarily mental. This DVD sequel pretty much joy rides right into slasher territory." He adds that while it "doesn't hold a candle to its vastly superior predecessor, I still found it to be above average when compared to the questionable quality of most of these uncalled for DVD sequel cash-ins of late."

The website Geeks of Doom writes, "While not as entertaining as the first one, Joy Ride 2 hits all the right notes for a horror film... The direction was good and the overall film quality was first rate. Plus the actors are ridiculously good looking, the acting toes the line between decent and good, and the body count and gore [are] high."

Reel Film Reviews gives a mixed review: "A slight cut above its direct-to-video horror brethren, Joy Ride 2: Dead Ahead nevertheless suffers from many of the same problems that one tends to associate with low-budget efforts of this ilk – including scarcely-developed characters, derivative storytelling, and a sporadic emphasis on needless elements... It probably doesn't help that screenwriters James Robert Johnston and Bennett Yellin seem to be going out of their way to transform Rusty Nail into a run-of-the-mill psychopath, as the shadowy figure's rationale for pursuing the four central characters is awfully weak – while his newfound penchant for torture smacks of a desperate attempt to ape the success of the Saw and Hostel series." The reviewer adds, "There's little doubt that Joy Ride 2: Dead Ahead suffers from the absence of Ted Levine's voice this time around, as the actor's exceedingly menacing delivery certainly stands as one of the more overtly indelible horror-movie performances in recent years."
