= The Next Step (film) =

- Directed by: Christian Faber
- Written by: Aaron Reed
- Produced by: Jack Aron; Hank Blumenthal; Richard Pepin; Rafael Moreu; Taylor Nichols
- Starring: Rick Negron; Kristin Moreu; Denise Faye; Taylor Nichols
- Cinematography: Zachary Winestine
- Edited by: David Codron; Judd H. Maslansky
- Music by: Mio Morales; Brian Otto; Roni Skies
- Distributed by: Phaedra Cinema
- Release date: June 13, 1997
- Running time: 96 minutes
- Country: United States
- Language: English

The Next Step is a 1997 American dance drama film, directed by Christian Faber. The film's dance scenes were choreographed by renowned Broadway dance director Donald Byrd.

== Premise ==
The film revolves around Nick, a womanizing dance performer whose career is in decline, despite only being in his 30s. His partner Amy, a dancer turned physical therapist, wants him to marry her, but Nick is afraid to commit and continues to see other women on the side.

== Cast ==
- Rick Negron as Nick
- Kristin Moreu as Amy
- Denise Faye as Heidi
- Taylor Nichols as Peter
- Gerry McIntyre as Sean
- Aubrey Lynch as Steven
- Michelle Pertier as Michelle
- Donald Byrd as Austin
- Jane Edith Wilson as Greta
- Thomas Gibson as Bartender

== Reception ==
Stephen Holden of The New York Times gave the film a positive review, writing that "The Next Step might be described as a kind of backstage Dirty Dancing. And although the movie has its awkward, unconvincing moments, this portrait of an aging dancer and freewheeling Lothario named Nick Mendez (Rick Negron), who belongs to the heterosexual minority in a field where most of the men are gay, has a sizzling erotic energy."

The Austin Chronicle's Marjorie Baumgarten gave the film two out of five stars. She criticized the "clunkiness of the film's dramatic plotting", and the "uneven performances, overly literal visual cues [and] hyperbolic ending." However, Baumgarten had a more positive view of the dance scenes, remarking that "the film's many dance sequences, which in addition to their entertainment value serve the narrative purpose of demonstrating the arduousness of the profession." AllMovie's Sandra Brennan also gave The Next Step two out of five stars, describing it as "an attempt to revive the dance film." She added that, "the story may be a chestnut, but the dance scenes are fine."
