= Dan Jenkins =

American author and sportswriter (1928–2019)

- Born: Daniel Thomas Jenkins; December 2, 1928; Fort Worth, Texas, U.S.
- Died: March 7, 2019 (aged 90); Fort Worth, Texas, U.S.
- Education: Texas Christian University
- Occupations: Author, sports journalist
- Years active: 1950s–2019
- Spouse: June Burrage (m. 1959)
- Children: 3, including Sally Jenkins

Daniel Thomas Jenkins (December 2, 1928 – March 7, 2019) was an American author and sportswriter who often wrote for Sports Illustrated. He was also a high-standard amateur golfer who played college golf at Texas Christian University.

== Early life and education ==
Jenkins was born in 1928 and raised in Fort Worth, Texas, where he attended R. L. Paschal High School and Texas Christian University, where he played on the varsity golf team.

== Career ==
Jenkins worked for many publications, including the Fort Worth Press, Dallas Times Herald, Playboy, and Sports Illustrated, where among other things, he covered the 1966, 1967, 1969, and 1971 versions of the college football Game of the Century. In 1985, he retired from Sports Illustrated and began writing books full-time, although he maintained a monthly column in Golf Digest.

Larry King called Jenkins "the quintessential Sports Illustrated writer" and "the best sportswriter in America." Jenkins wrote numerous works and over 500 articles for Sports Illustrated. In 1972, Jenkins wrote his first novel, Semi-Tough.

In December 2014, Jenkins published an article in Golf Digest titled "My (Fake) interview with Tiger; or how it plays out in my mind." In the piece, which featured images of a Tiger Woods lookalike in golfing gear, Jenkins mocks Woods's reputation in an imaginary interview with the athlete. Though the piece was clearly marked as parody, the champion golfer requested an apology from the magazine. Woods stated that the piece "fails as parody, and is really more like a grudge-fueled piece of character assassination."

== Personal life ==
Jenkins's daughter Sally Jenkins is a sports columnist for The Atlantic.

== Awards and honors ==
- In 1993, Jenkins was inducted into the Texas Golf Hall of Fame in the Distinguished Service Category.
- In 2012, Jenkins earned the PEN/ESPN Lifetime Achievement Award for Literary Sports Writing.
- In 2012, Jenkins entered the World Golf Hall of Fame in the Lifetime Achievement Category
- In 2013, he earned the Red Smith Award, an award bestowed by the Associated Press for excellent sports coverage.
- In 2015, Jenkins was honored with the Old Tom Morris Award by the Golf Course Superintendents Association of America.
- In 2017, he earned the Ring Lardner Award for Excellence in Sports Journalism.
- In 2017, Texas Christian University named the press box after him.

== Bibliography ==
- Jenkins, Dan (1970). The Dogged Victims of Inexorable Fate. Simon & Schuster. ISBN 978-0-671-66750-4.
- Jenkins, Dan (1972). Semi-Tough. Atheneum. ASIN B000OL8MP0.
- Jenkins, Dan (1973). Saturday's America. Berkley Books. ISBN 978-0425023952.
- Jenkins, Dan (1974). Dead Solid Perfect. Atheneum. ISBN 978-0689106200.
- Jenkins, Dan; Shrake, Edwin (1976). Limo: A Novel. Atheneum. ISBN 978-0689107344.
- Jenkins, Dan (September 1, 1981). Baja Oklahoma. Atheneum. ISBN 978-7018982948.
- Jenkins, Dan (October 1, 1984). Life Its Ownself. Simon & Schuster. ISBN 978-0671460242.
- Jenkins, Dan (October 1, 1988). Fast Copy: A Novel. Simon & Schuster. ISBN 978-0671602062.
- Jenkins, Dan (September 1, 1989). You Call It Sports, But I Say It's a Jungle Out There. Simon & Schuster. ISBN 978-0671690212.
- Jenkins, Dan (October 15, 1991). You Gotta Play Hurt. Simon & Schuster. ISBN 978-0671683320.
- Jenkins, Dan (September 1, 1993). Bubba Talks: Of Life, Love, Sex, Whiskey, Politics, Movies, Food, Foreigners, Teenagers, Football. Anchor. ISBN 978-0385470797.
- Jenkins, Dan (May 1, 1994). Fairways and Greens. Doubleday. ISBN 978-0385474252.
- Jenkins, Dan; Stout, Glenn, eds. (November 15, 1995). The Best American Sports Writing 1995. Houghton Mifflin. ISBN 978-0395700709.
- Jenkins, Dan (September 15, 1998). Rude Behavior. Doubleday. ISBN 978-0385470001.
- Jenkins, Dan (August 7, 2001). The Money-Whipped Steer-Job Three-Jack Give-Up Artist: A Novel. Doubleday. ISBN 978-0385497237.
- Jenkins, Dan (May 3, 2005). Slim and None. Doubleday. ISBN 978-0385508520.
- Jenkins, Dan (June 3, 2008). The Franchise Babe: A Novel. Doubleday. ISBN 978-0385519106.
- Jenkins, Dan (May 5, 2009). Jenkins at the Majors: Sixty Years of the World's Best Golf Writing, from Hogan to Tiger. Doubleday. ISBN 978-0385519137.
- Jenkins, Dan (March 4, 2014). His Ownself: A Semi-Memoir. Doubleday. ISBN 978-0385532259.
- Jenkins, Dan (January 1, 2017). Stick a Fork in Me: A Novel. Gallery Books. ISBN 978-1507201473.
- Jenkins, Dan (November 11, 2019). The Reunion at Herb's Café. TCU Press. ISBN 978-0875657271.
