= Jürgen Prochnow =

German actor (born 1941)

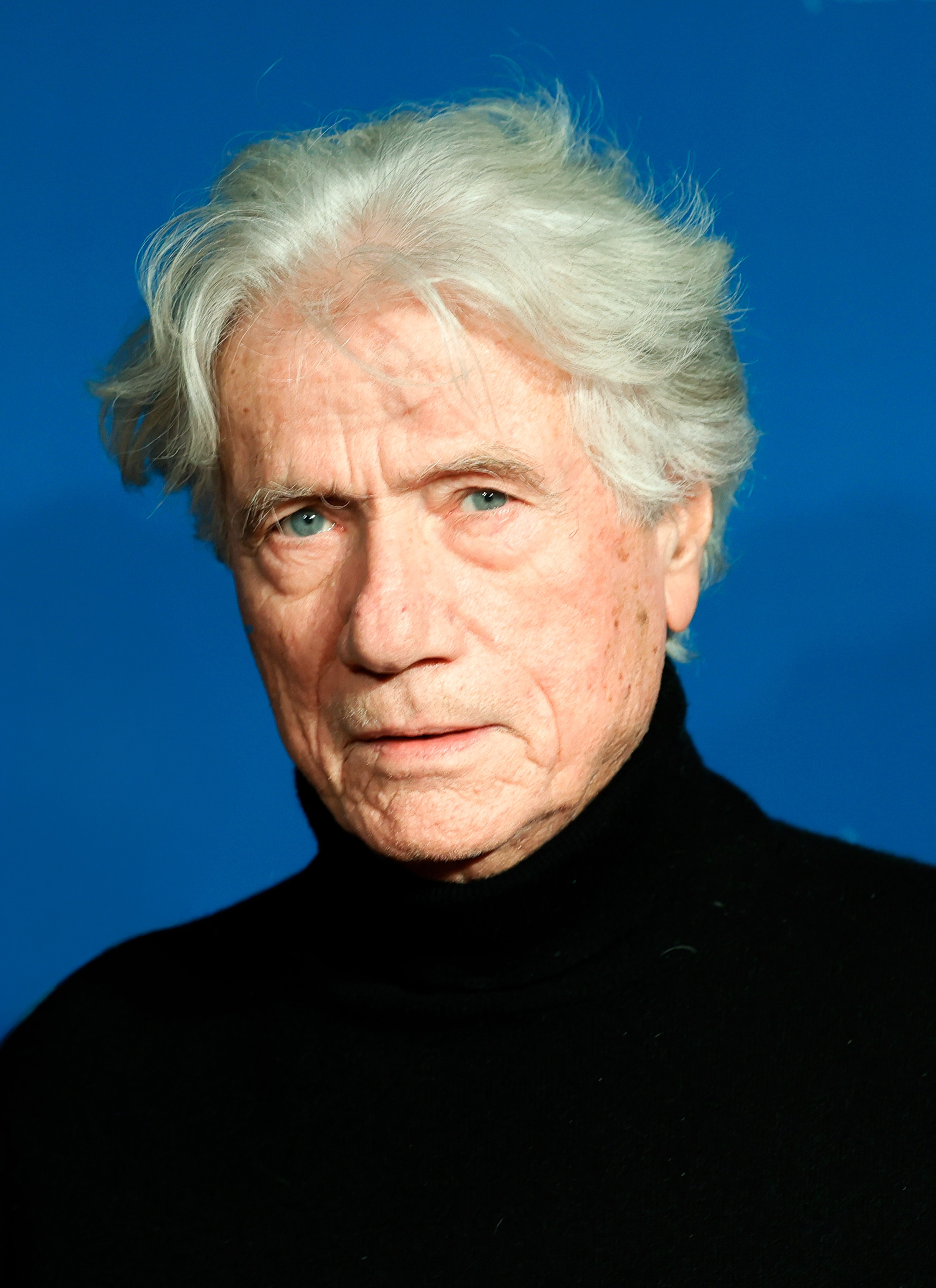
- Prochnow in 2025
- Born: 10 June 1941 (age 85); Berlin, Germany
- Citizenship: Germany; United States (since 2004)
- Occupation: Actor
- Years active: 1963–present
- Spouses: Isabel Goslar (m. 1982; div. 1997); Birgit Stein (m. 2004; div. 2014); Verena Wengler (m. 2015)
- Partner: Antonia Reininghaus (1978–1981)
- Children: 3

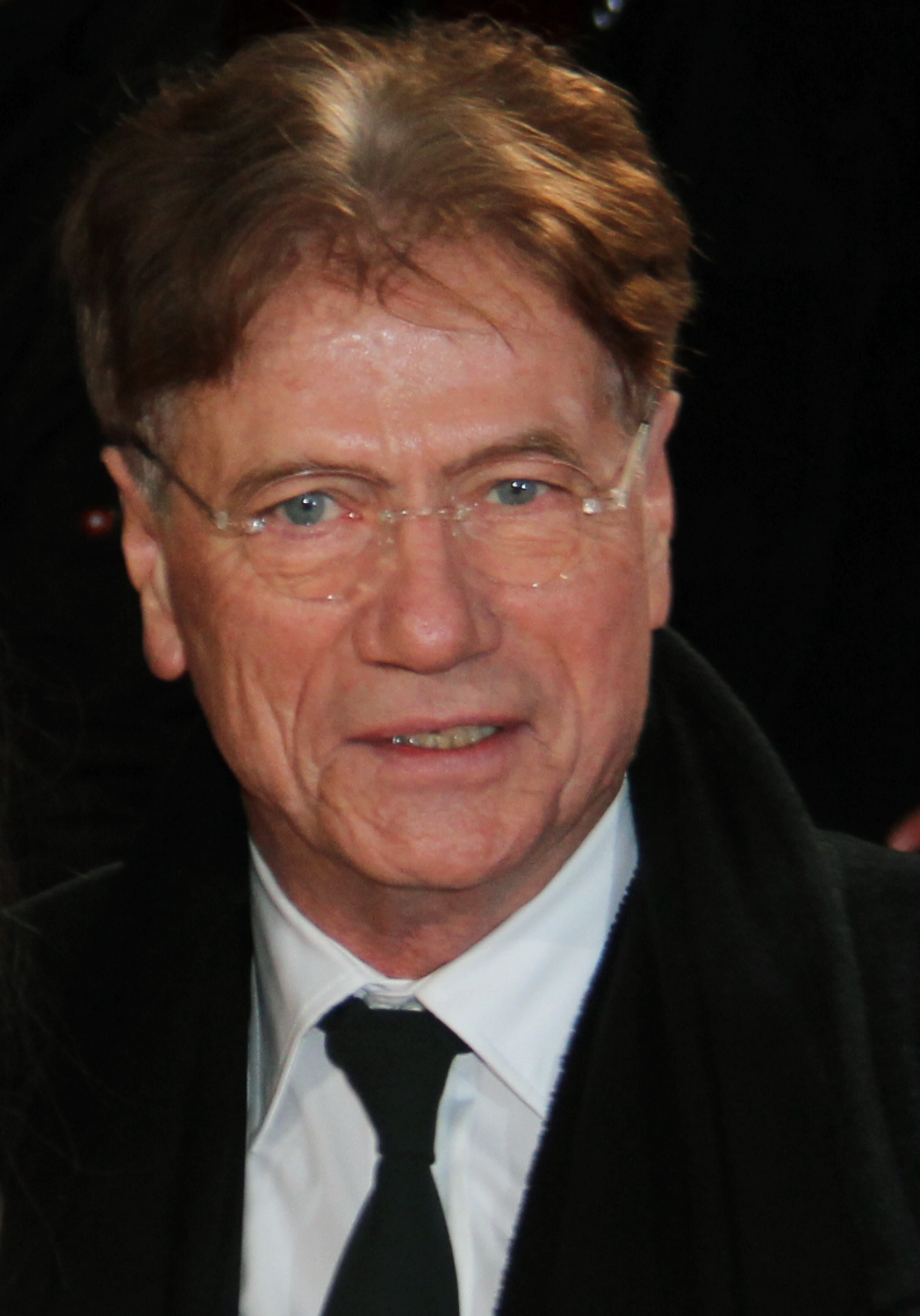
Prochnow in 2012

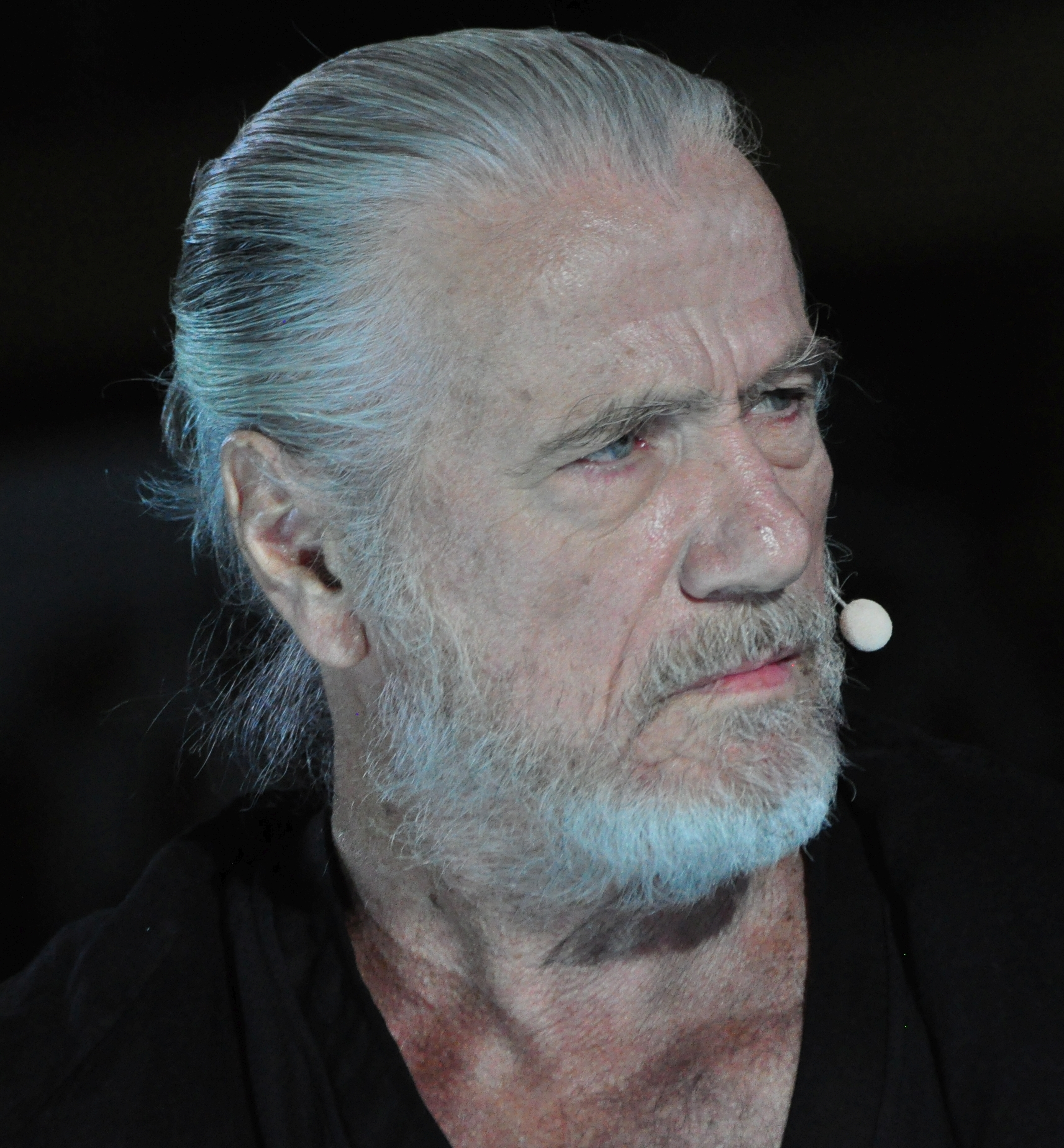
Prochnow in 2018

Jürgen Prochnow (German pronunciation: [ˈjʏʁɡn̩ ˈpʁɔxnoː]; born 10 June 1941) is a German actor. His international breakthrough was his portrayal of the good-hearted and sympathetic U-boat Commander "Der Alte" ("Old Man") in the 1981 war film Das Boot.

He is also known for his roles in The Lost Honour of Katharina Blum (1975), Dune (1984), Beverly Hills Cop II (1987), A Dry White Season (1989), In the Mouth of Madness (1994), The English Patient (1996), Air Force One (1997), The Da Vinci Code (2006), and for playing Sergei Bazhaev on the eighth season of 24 (2010). He is a Goldene Kamera, Bavarian Film Awards, and Bambi Award winner.

== Early life ==
Prochnow was born on 10 June 1941 in Berlin in Germany. He was brought up in Düsseldorf. His father was an engineer.

== Career ==
Prochnow portrayed the good-hearted and sympathetic U-boat Commander "Der Alte" ("Old Man") in the 1981 war film Das Boot. He starred in the World War II drama Forbidden (1985), which earned a German Film Award nomination for Outstanding Feature Film. He had a significant supporting role in The Seventh Sign (1988).

Prochnow portrayed Arnold Schwarzenegger in See Arnold Run, a 2005 film about the actor's political career in California. He played Commander Paul Gerald in Wing Commander (1999). He was the main antagonist in the Broken Lizard film, Beerfest (2006).

Prochnow dubbed Sylvester Stallone's voice in the German version of Rocky (1976) and Rocky II (1979), as well as F.I.S.T and Paradise Alley (both 1978). He later acted alongside Stallone in the 1995 movie Judge Dredd. After the retirement of Stallone's long-time voice actor Thomas Danneberg, Prochnow assumed this job in 2018 with Creed II. He usually also dubs his own roles in English-language productions.

Prochnow and his older brother, Dieter appeared in The Man Inside (1990), in which Jürgen played the leading role and Dieter a supporting role.

In 1996, he was a member of the jury at the 46th Berlin International Film Festival.

== Personal life ==
In the early 1980s, Prochnow was in a relationship with Austrian actress Antonia Reininghaus, who fatally poisoned their 7-year-old daughter, Johanna, in 1987. In 1982, he married actor Jürgen Goslar's daughter, Isabel Goslar, with whom he has two children: a daughter, Mona, and a son, Roman. The couple divorced in 1997. From 2004 until the divorce in 2014, he was married to Birgit Stein, a German actress and screenwriter. Stein died in August 2018 in a motorcycle accident in Kanab, Utah. Since 2015, he has been married to actress Verena Wengler.

Prochnow used to divide his time between Los Angeles and Munich. He received U.S. citizenship in 2004. In 2017, he announced that he had sold his house in Brentwood, Los Angeles, and would be moving to Berlin.

== Awards ==
- 1985 Bavarian Film Awards: Best Actor

== Filmography ==
=== Film ===
Year	Title	Role
1972	Zoff	Joky
1972	The Merchant of Four Seasons	Mann am Stammtisch / Man at the Meeting Table (uncredited)
1973	The Tenderness of Wolves	Hehler
1974	Die Verrohung des Franz Blum	Franz Blum
1974	One or the Other of Us	Bernd Ziegenhals
1975	The Lost Honour of Katharina Blum	Ludwig Götten
1977	Die Konsequenz (The Consequence)	Martin Kurath
1977	Operation Ganymed (1977)	Oss
1980	As Far as the Eye Sees	Alexander Späh
1981	Das Boot (“The Boat”)	Commander (“Der Alte”) of U96
1982	War and Peace	Kevin
1983	The Keep	Captain Klaus Woermann
1984	Dune	Duke Leto Atreides
1984	Forbidden	Fritz Friedländer
1985	The Cop and the Girl	The Cop
1986	Killing Cars	Ralph Korda
1987	Terminus	Sir / Doctor / Yellow Truck's Driver
1987	Des Teufels Paradies (Devil's Paradise)	Escher
1987	Beverly Hills Cop II	Maxwell Dent
1988	The Seventh Sign	David Bannon
1989	A Dry White Season	Captain Stolz
1990	The Fourth War	Col. Valachev
1990	Kill Cruise	The Skipper
1990	The Man Inside	Günter Wallraff
1990	The Schoolmaster	Rozinsky
1991	Robin Hood	Sir Miles Folcanet
1992	Hurricane Smith	Charlie Dowd
1992	Twin Peaks: Fire Walk with Me	Woodsman
1992	Interceptor	Phillips
1993	Body of Evidence	Doctor Alan Paley
1993	The Lucona Affair	Hans Strasser
1993	The Last Border	Duke
1993	Die Wildnis	Brenner
1994	Trigger Fast	Jack Neumann
1994	In the Mouth of Madness	Sutter Cane
1995	Judge Dredd	Judge Griffin
1996	The English Patient	Major Muller
1996	DNA	Dr. Carl Wessinger
1997	Air Force One	General Ivan Radek
1998	The Replacement Killers	Michael Kogan
1998	China Dream	Paul Konen
1998	Schuldig	
1999	The Fall	József Kovács
1999	Wing Commander	Cdr. Paul Gerald
1999	Youri	
2000	Gunblast Vodka	Sacha Roublev
2000	The Last Stop	Fritz
2001	Jack the Dog	Klaus
2001	The Elite	Avi
2001	Last Run	Andrus Bukarin
2001	Ripper	Detective Kelso
2001	Dark Asylum	Dr. Fallon
2002	Heart of America	Harold Lewis
2002	Checkpoint	
2003	House of the Dead	Capitain Victor Kirk
2003	The Poet	Vashon
2003	Baltic Storm	Erik Westermark
2006	Chain Reaction	
2006	The Celestine Prophecy	Jensen
2006	The Da Vinci Code	Andre Vernet
2006	Beerfest	Baron Wolfgang von Wolfhausen
2006	Schroeder's Wonderful World	John Gregory
2007	Primeval	Jacob Krieg
2007	Nanking	John Rabe
2008	La Conjura de El Escorial	Espinosa
2008	Merlin and the War of the Dragons	The Mage
2009	Oko (2009),	Mr. Hooked
2010	Sinners & Saints	Mr. Rhykin
2012	Die Schuld der Erben	Kurt Hanson
2013	Ein schmaler Grat	Uwe Wolfmann
2013	Company of Heroes	Luca Gruenewald
2013	Ohne Gnade!	Helmutchen
2013	Die Kinder meiner Tochter	Ernst Blessing
2014	Twin Peaks: The Missing Pieces	Woodsman
2015	Hitman: Agent 47	Tobias
2015	Remember	Rudy Kurlander No. 4
2015	The Dark Side of the Moon	Pius Ott
2016	Interference	Herr Ryser
2017	Old Agent Men	Kern
2017	Leanders letzte Reise	Eduard Leander
2017	Damascus Cover	Franz Ludin
2017	Dengler	Dr. Schweikert
2019	A Hidden Life	Major Schlegel (uncredited)
2023	The Last Rifleman	12th SS Veteran

=== Television ===
Year	Title	Role
1972	Shot on Command – The Sass Brothers, Once Berlin's Big Crooks	Franz Sass
1973	Tatort: Jagdrevier	Dieter Brodschella
1976	Hans im Glück	Hans Schmidtke
1977	Tatort: Das Mädchen von gegenüber	Klaus Linder
1983	Love Is Forever	General Siegfried Kaplan
1992	Jewels	Joachim von Mannheim
1993	The Fire Next Time	Larry Richter
1993	Evelyn Hamanns Geschichten aus dem Leben	
1994	Lie Down with Lions	Marteau
1994	Guns of Honor	Jack Neumann
1994	Aventures dans le Grand Nord	Simon McQuarie
1995	Tödliche Wahl	Alex Bronner
1995	Fesseln	Guenther
1996	Sorellina e il principe del sogno	Kurdok
1996	On Dangerous Ground	Carl Morgan
1996	The Great War and the Shaping of the 20th Century	Kaiser Wilhelm II
1997	The Cry of Love	Holger
1998	The Human Bomb	Gerhardt Dach
1999	Esther	Haman
1999	The Blond Baboon	Jan Vleuten
1999	Heaven's Fire	Quentin Darby
2000	Poison	Carl Krieger
2000	Padre Pio: Miracle Man	Visitatore / The Inquisitor
2000	Final Ascent	Paul
2002	Davon stirbt man nicht	Everett Burns
2004	Julie, chevalier de Maupin	Baron de Hengen
2005	See Arnold Run	Arnold Schwarzenegger
2007	Ohne einander	Ernest
2007	Ein Fall für zwei	KHK Max Gerber
2010	24 (2010)	Sergei Bazhaev
2010	Spear of Destiny	Baron von Hahn
2010	Tatort: Schlafende Hunde	Hans Rodenburg
2010	Amigo	Fredo Kovacs
2010-2014	NCIS: Los Angeles	Mattias Draeger
2010	Nachtschicht	Friedrich Otto Winterstein
2012	Luck	Racetrack Owner
2016	Tatort: Borowski und das verlorene Mädchen	Kesting
2017	Dengler	Dr. Schweikert
2018	Lore	Andreas Gruber

=== Video games ===
Year	Title	Role
1996	Privateer 2: The Darkening (video game)	Xavier Shondi
2008	Dark Sector (video game)	Yargo Mensik (voice)
2008	Hellboy: The Science of Evil (video game)	Herman von Klempt (voice)

== Audiobooks (excerpt) ==
- 2008: Frank Herbert: Dune: Der Wüstenplanet (together with Simon Jäger and Marianne Rosenberg), publisher: Lübbe Audio, ISBN 978-3-7857-3584-8
- 2013: Andreas Eschbach: Quantenmüll, publisher: Lübbe Audio (Audible)
- 2017: Andreas Eschbach: Eine unberührte Welt (together with Simon Jäger, Yara Blümel and Nicole Engeln), publisher: Lübbe Audio, ISBN 978-3785754979
