= Allagash, Maine =

Town in Maine, United States

- Town
- Location of Allagash in Aroostook County, Maine

- Location of Allagash in Maine Location of Allagash in the USA
- Coordinates: 47°06′38″N 69°05′33″W
- Country: United States
- State: Maine
- County: Aroostook
- Incorporated: January 31, 1966

Area
  - Total: 131.42 sq mi (340.38 km^{2})
  - Land: 128.61 sq mi (333.10 km^{2})
  - Water: 2.81 sq mi (7.28 km^{2})
- Elevation: 853 ft (260 m)

Population (2020)
  - Total: 237
  - Density: 1.8/sq mi (0.7/km^{2})
- Time zone: UTC-5 (Eastern (EST))
  - Summer (DST): UTC-4 (EDT)
- ZIP code: 04774
- Area code: 207
- FIPS code: 23-00800
- GNIS feature ID: 582320

Allagash is a town in Aroostook County, Maine, United States. It is on the Allagash River in the North Maine Woods region.

The population was 237 at the 2020 census.

== Geography ==
According to the United States Census Bureau, the town has a total area of 131.42 square miles (340.38 km^{2}), of which 128.61 square miles (333.10 km^{2}) is land and 2.81 square miles (7.28 km^{2}) is water. This makes Allagash the largest town in Maine in terms of total land area (although when both land and water areas are included in the total, then Vinalhaven and St. George, both in coastal Knox County, are larger than Allagash).

=== Climate ===
This climatic region is typified by large seasonal temperature differences, with warm to hot (and often humid) summers and cold (sometimes severely cold) winters. According to the Köppen Climate Classification system, Allagash has a humid continental climate, abbreviated "Dfb" on climate maps, bordering on a subarctic climate (Dfc).

Climate data for Allagash, Maine, 1991–2020 normals, extremes 1986–2012: 596ft (182m)
Month	Jan	Feb	Mar	Apr	May	Jun	Jul	Aug	Sep	Oct	Nov	Dec	Year
Record high °F (°C)	54 (12)	61 (16)	68 (20)	84 (29)	92 (33)	95 (35)	96 (36)	93 (34)	93 (34)	81 (27)	70 (21)	61 (16)	96 (36)
Mean daily maximum °F (°C)	20.0 (−6.7)	23.7 (−4.6)	34.4 (1.3)	47.5 (8.6)	62.6 (17.0)	72.5 (22.5)	77.1 (25.1)	76.0 (24.4)	67.4 (19.7)	52.7 (11.5)	39.0 (3.9)	26.6 (−3.0)	50.0 (10.0)
Daily mean °F (°C)	7.1 (−13.8)	8.8 (−12.9)	19.8 (−6.8)	35.5 (1.9)	49.0 (9.4)	59.0 (15.0)	64.4 (18.0)	62.5 (16.9)	54.0 (12.2)	42.2 (5.7)	30.3 (−0.9)	16.9 (−8.4)	37.5 (3.0)
Mean daily minimum °F (°C)	−5.8 (−21.0)	−6.2 (−21.2)	5.1 (−14.9)	23.5 (−4.7)	35.4 (1.9)	45.5 (7.5)	51.6 (10.9)	49.0 (9.4)	40.6 (4.8)	31.6 (−0.2)	21.6 (−5.8)	7.2 (−13.8)	24.9 (−3.9)
Record low °F (°C)	−47 (−44)	−43 (−42)	−34 (−37)	−5 (−21)	13 (−11)	17 (−8)	28 (−2)	28 (−2)	20 (−7)	9 (−13)	−13 (−25)	−36 (−38)	−47 (−44)
Average precipitation inches (mm)	2.56 (65)	1.97 (50)	2.17 (55)	2.89 (73)	2.88 (73)	3.56 (90)	4.25 (108)	3.59 (91)	3.40 (86)	3.96 (101)	3.28 (83)	3.00 (76)	37.51 (951)
Average snowfall inches (cm)	19.1 (49)	21.0 (53)	17.5 (44)	7.1 (18)	0.4 (1.0)	0.0 (0.0)	0.0 (0.0)	0.0 (0.0)	0.0 (0.0)	2.1 (5.3)	8.5 (22)	24.0 (61)	99.7 (253.3)
Average precipitation days (≥ 0.01 in)	11.1	9.7	11.0	12.1	12.6	12.8	15.1	12.4	11.4	12.5	12.3	12.5	145.5
Average snowy days (≥ 0.1 in)	8.6	7.6	6.5	2.9	0.2	0.0	0.0	0.0	0.0	0.6	4.5	8.7	39.6
Source 1: NOAA
Source 2: National Weather Service

== Demographics ==
Historical population
Census	Pop.	Note	%±
1890	200		—
1900	190		−5.0%
1910	245		28.9%
1920	359		46.5%
1930	438		22.0%
1940	644		47.0%
1950	680		5.6%
1960	557		−18.1%
1970	456		−18.1%
1980	448		−1.8%
1990	359		−19.9%
2000	277		−22.8%
2010	239		−13.7%
2020	237		−0.8%
U.S. Decennial Census

Languages (2000)	Percent
Spoke English at home	78.07%
Spoke French at home	21.93%

As of 2000 the median income for a household in the town was $18,125, and the median income for a family was $26,250. Males had a median income of $26,875 versus $17,813 for females. The per capita income for the town was $11,968. About 15.1% of families and 18.8% of the population were below the poverty line, including 27.3% of those under the age of eighteen and 23.5% of those 65 or over.

=== 2010 census ===
As of the census of 2010, there were 239 people, 124 households, and 76 families residing in the town. The population density was 1.9 inhabitants per square mile (0.7/km^{2}). There were 307 housing units at an average density of 2.4 per square mile (0.9/km^{2}). The racial makeup of the town was 97.5% White, 0.4% African American, and 2.1% from two or more races. Hispanic or Latino of any race were 0.8% of the population.

There were 124 households, of which 13.7% had children under the age of 18 living with them, 47.6% were married couples living together, 6.5% had a female householder with no husband present, 7.3% had a male householder with no wife present, and 38.7% were non-families. 35.5% of all households were made up of individuals, and 15.3% had someone living alone who was 65 years of age or older. The average household size was 1.93 and the average family size was 2.41.

The median age in the town was 57.8 years. 11.3% of residents were under the age of 18; 3% were between the ages of 18 and 24; 16.3% were from 25 to 44; 37.7% were from 45 to 64; and 31.8% were 65 years of age or older. The gender makeup of the town was 49.0% male and 51.0% female.

== Notable people ==
- Troy Jackson, United States Senator-Elect
- Cathie Pelletier, novelist and songwriter
