= Candles on Bay Street (2006 film) =

- Genre: Drama
- Based on: Candles on Bay Street by K.C. McKinnon
- Teleplay by: Jonathan Estrin; Michael Bortman
- Directed by: John Erman
- Starring: Alicia Silverstone
- Country of origin: United States

Original release
- Network: Hallmark Channel
- Release: 2006

Candles on Bay Street is a 2006 television film.

== Plot ==
Dee Dee Michaud, a single mother, returns to her hometown and poses a potential threat to the marriage of her old high school flame and his wife.

== Critical reception ==
Variety wrote "Hallmark Hall of Fame’s 228th production is predictable, sappy, somewhat maudlin, and by the time it’s over, there won’t be a dry eye in the house. Alicia Silverstone brings a touch of star wattage to what’s really an ensemble-built, “It takes a village” story, based on K.C. McKinnon’s bestselling novel.
