= Dove International =

American Christian ministry

Founder
- Larry Kreider; LaVerne Kreider

Religions
- Christian

Languages
- English

Website
- dcfi.org

DOVE International is a Christian ministry founded by Larry and LaVerne Kreider involved with churches and ministries in five continents. DOVE is an backronym which stands for “Declaring Our Victory Emmanuel." Christian publisher House to House Publications has published over 50 titles, including Kreider's book House to House.

== History ==
In the late 1970s, Larry and LaVerne Kreider started a small group Bible study to reach unchurched youth in Lancaster County, Pennsylvania. The Kreiders were unable to connect these youth to local churches in their area. Larry Kreider began an "underground church" in response to this problem.

Kreider recruited some young couples to help in leadership of small groups. These groups met together in a large living room for their first Sunday morning celebration in October 1980. DOVE Christian Fellowship was born.

First Ten Years - DOVE Christian Fellowship grew to over 2,000 believers scattered throughout a seven-county region of Pennsylvania. More than one hundred small groups met during the week and on Sunday mornings.

Small Group Churches Emerge 1996 - Eight small group-based churches were created from the one. Included were three other small group churches in Kenya, Uganda and New Zealand. The leadership of these churches were turned over to "senior elders".

DOVE International's Third Chapter 2024 - In 2017, the succession process began for a new international director. In 2021, Merle Shenk agreed to become the next international director of DOVE International. After a three-year succession process, Larry and LaVerne Kreider officially "passed the baton" to Merle and Cheree Shenk at a succession ceremony in April 2024.

The International Apostolic Council, led by Larry Kreider, was created to train, oversee and mentor new local leaders throughout the world. The council oversees the DOVE International family of churches and includes leaders actively involved with the ministry.

The members of the Apostolic Council are Merle and Cheree Shenk, Ron and Bonnie Myer, Hesbone and Violet Odindo, Ibrahim and Diane Omondi, and Brian and Janet Sauder.

== International ventures ==
In the book The Challenges of the Pentecostal, Charismatic and Messianic Jewish Movements, author Peter Hocken highlights the international role DOVE International churches are playing in the spread of Pentecostalism.

Over 1,000 churches and house churches are affiliated with the DOVE International "apostolic movement" in various places like DOVE Westgate Church in USA, as well as other churches in 25 nations. DOVE International also includes churches in Europe

Church and house church planting is one of the focuses of their work. DOVE International have a significant number of churches in east Africa.

== Publishing ==
DOVE International has published over 50 titles on topics concerning Christian churches, leadership and Christian life. The publishing arm has produced materials used by churches and organizations. One such ministry training organization is Christian Leaders Institute, which uses DOVE International's materials on house churches.

== Peer Review Membership ==
DOVE International is a member of a peer accountability organization called ACEA. This organization was founded by C.Peter Wagner, a former professor of Fuller Theological Seminary.
