= Jack the Dog =

2001 film by Bobby Roth

- Official film poster
- Directed by: Bobby Roth
- Written by: Bobby Roth
- Produced by: Jeffrey White; Bobby Roth; Margie Glick; Jack Baran
- Starring: Néstor Carbonell; Barbara Williams; Barry Newman; Anthony LaPaglia
- Cinematography: Georg Fick
- Edited by: Margaret Guinee
- Music by: Christopher Franke
- Production company: Jung N Restless Productions
- Distributed by: Rivercoast Films
- Release date: January 22, 2001 (Sundance)
- Running time: 85 minutes
- Country: United States
- Language: English

Jack the Dog is a 2001 American comedy-drama film, written and directed by Bobby Roth and starring Néstor Carbonell, Barbara Williams, Barry Newman, and Anthony LaPaglia. The film premiered at the Sundance Film Festival on January 22, 2001, and was released on DVD in the United States by Rivercoast Films on August 12, 2008. A sequel, Manhood, was released in 2003.

== Plot ==
Serial womanizer Jack settles down with Faith, but when the marriage falls apart due to Jack's desire for women, he has to share custody of their son, Sam. Living with Sam makes Jack slowly change his thinking and way of life.

== Cast ==
- Néstor Carbonell as Jack The Dog
- Barbara Williams as Faith
- Andrew J. Ferchland as Sam
- Barry Newman as Simon
- Anthony LaPaglia as Jack's Attorney
- Travis Fine as Buddy
- Peter Coyote as Alfred Stieglitz
- Thomas Gibson as Faith's Attorney
- Jürgen Prochnow as Klaus
- Lauren Tom as Angel
- Navi Rawat as Ruby
- Grey DeLisle as Estella
- Gia Carides as Georgia
- Gabe Kaplan as Richie
- Tracey Walter as The Mortician

== Release ==
The film premiered at the Sundance Film Festival on January 22, 2001. Rivercoast Films distributed the film through home media in the United States on August 12, 2008.

== Reception ==
Jack the Dog received a mixed to negative response from film critics, and gained an indifferent reception during its premiere at the Sundance Film Festival. Todd McCarthy of Variety wrote: "Tale, which lurches along with little sense of pacing or time elapsed, has plenty of niggling problems," and added: "Performances, from the handsome Carbonell to those of Williams as the rhinoceros-hided wife and the many actresses in for literally quickies, are energetic but no more illuminating than the dialogue as to the inner life of their characters." DVD Talk rated the film 3 of 5 stars, saying "I think the parts between Sam and Jack were very well acted and this comprised the biggest part of the movie so I leaned towards upping the rating but I'll leave it where it is."
