= The Devil's Child =

1997 American TV movie

- Front cover of DVD
- Genre: Drama; Horror; Thriller
- Written by: Pablo F. Fenjves
- Story by: Pablo F. Fenjves; Laurence Minkoff
- Directed by: Bobby Roth
- Starring: Kim Delaney; Thomas Gibson; Gia Carides; Ivana Miličević; Grace Zabriskie
- Music by: Christopher Franke
- Country of origin: United States
- Original language: English

Production
- Executive producers: Alan Barnette; Craig Baumgarten; David R. Ginsburg
- Producers: Mark S. Glick; Pablo F. Fenjves; Laurence Minkoff
- Cinematography: Shelly Johnson
- Running time: 120 minutes
- Production companies: Citadel Entertainment; Baumgarten-Prophet Entertainment

Original release
- Network: ABC
- Release: October 26, 1997

The Devil's Child is a 1997 American made-for-television horror film. Written by Pablo F. Fenjves and Laurence Minkoff, and directed by Bobby Roth, the film was first shown on ABC on October 26, 1997. It has had releases in different countries under different titles, with a DVD commercial re-release in 2005.

== Plot ==
The mother of Nikki DeMarco (Kim Delaney) makes a pact with Satan to save her daughter's life after she has fallen from a building and nearly died. While a priest is performing the last rites, Lucifer appears, and says that he will spare her daughter's life if she promises that one day Nikki will bear his son, the Antichrist. Her mother agrees and the Devil saves Nikki. Years later, Nikki, now a successful photographer, is in a hospital watching over her mother who is now on her deathbed. Her mother tries to warn her of the impending evil, and dies. When Nikki touches her mother's crucifix her hand is burned. Nikki moves into a new apartment, not knowing that the room she is currently living in was the scene of a brutal murder years before. Nikki is skeptical of faith and religion and has become more and more isolated from spiritual ways of life.

One night as she's leaving a bar after an argument with a coworker, Nikki storms off with the co-worker following her. He dies after being hit by a car and she is saved by a mysterious, handsome stranger. The next day she finds out that the stranger, Alexander Rotha (Thomas Gibson), lives across the hall from her. He is a theology professor at a prominent university. He and Nikki grow close and eventually become lovers. Meanwhile, the priest tries to warn Nikki of the evil that is after her, but is thrown from a room high above the church chapel by a gust of wind. Nikki witnesses this and is shocked. She then speaks with a priest named Father Domenico who knows something strange is going on. Nikki then visits Rotha's class in the university where he humiliates a female student by revealing her affair with a professor. No one knew about the affair, yet Rotha did. After seeing this other side of Rotha, Nikki decides she wants nothing to do with him.

Rotha begins stalking Nikki. Nikki reads a journal that once belonged to the dead priest. She realizes that Alex Rotha is really Satan. She then discovers that she is pregnant with Rotha's child, even though she was told that she could not bear children because of the accident years before. Doctors tell her it is a medical miracle. She tries to get an abortion, but a mysterious explosion kills everyone in the hospital. During her pregnancy, Nikki returns to her Catholic faith and tries to find a way to save herself and her child. Eventually she goes into labor in her own apartment, and sees a vision of her mother making the fatal pact with Satan. She gives birth, and is at first happy, but then sees the Devil thanking her for bearing his son. When she awakens the next day, Nikki is in the apartment with her friend, who also has made a deal with the Devil, and has no choice but to knock her out with a pan to escape with the child. She then runs to the safety of a church, knowing that baptism is a form of exorcism. The Devil tries to stop this by causing so much wind to enter the church that it causes an earthquake. The priest nevertheless baptizes the child and the wind stops. Nikki leaves the church with her child in her arms, while the Devil looks at her with an emotionless face and then walks away.

== Cast ==
- Kim Delaney as Nikki DeMarco
- Gia Carides as Eva
- Ivana Miličević as Ivana Milavich
- Grace Zabriskie as Rose DeMarco
- Thomas Gibson as Alexander Rotha
- Rachael Bella as Young Nikki
- Paul Bartel as Dr. Zimmerman
- Martin Davidson as Max
- Maya Rudolph as Holly
- Colleen Flynn as Ruby Martin
- Matthew Lillard as Tim
- Christopher John Fields as Father Domenico
- Larry Holden as Todd Gilman
- Henry G. Sanders as Detective Repp
- Nick Roth as Sam

== Release ==
The film had initial release in the United States in 1997, as La malédiction de Nikki in France in 1998 and again as recently as 2008, Netherlands in 1999, and Sweden in 2001. It has also been released as O Filho do Demônio (Brazil), Pahan lapsi (Finland) and as To moro tou Satana (Greece). The Devil's Child had a commercial DVD release in 2005.

== Reception ==
New York Daily News called the film "utterly predictable" and a "shameless rip-off of Rosemary's Baby". The Chicago Sun Times concurred, writing that Kim Delaney and Thomas Gibson were wasting "their acting talent and sex appeal in a trashy variation of Rosemary's Baby." The Washington Post also agreed with this assessment, adding "...with a bit of The Omen thrown in". Conversely, San Diego Union Tribune called it "an entertaining Halloween flick."
