= American Choreography Awards =

The American Choreography Awards was a ceremony and show that honored outstanding choreographers in the fields of feature film, television, music videos, and commercials. They were first known as the L.A. Dance Awards (1994–95), then as Bob Fosse Awards, and a.k.a. Fosse’s (1996–97), and eventually the American Choreography Awards (1998-'04). Each year in the fall, they were held at a different location in Los Angeles, California. These include places such as the Orpheum Theatre, El Capitan Theatre, Alex Theatre, Wilshire Ebell Theatre, The Hollywood Palace, The Museum of Flying, The Century Club, and Club Tatou.

== History ==
The template for American Choreography Awards was created in 1994 (as the L.A. Dance Awards) by the Choreographers Resourcenter, a group of individuals led by Grover Dale, who were determined to expose and get recognition for the art of choreography for the camera. Due to a generous grant from the Bob Fosse Foundation, they were titled the Fosse Awards for two years(1996-'97)and in 1998 became the American Choreography Awards. The decade of accumulative awards were eventually recognized as one of the highest standards of achievement in choreography throughout the entertainment industry.

Choreographers were nominated in eight different categories of choreography. These include feature film, short film, television special, episodic and variety show, fight choreography, commercials, and music videos. In addition to awards within each category, honorary awards were given by the event production team such as the Governor’s Award, the Educator’s Award, the Innovator Award, the Career Achievement Award and/or the Lifetime Achievement Award.

The way in which the nominations were determined was through ballots mailed to membership mailing lists. After calculation by the event team, the top five in each category were then screened by seven individual panel committees, composed of producers, directors, casting directors, and media choreographers. The committee members then selected the winner (and often ties) in each category.

== Billman collection of memorabilia ==
For the last five years of the event (2000-'04) The Academy of Dance on Film (DOF) presented and was the beneficiary of these prestigious awards. Larry Billman founded the Academy in 1998. He was a former tapper who turned stage writer, researcher, and director. He created a non-profit organization catering to the interests of teachers, choreographers, researchers, students, and dance fans. Billman has been collecting dance related material for over thirty years through donations and his own purchases. Originally, it was housed in Hollywood, where the American Choreography Awards (ACA) team had an office and work space. To save the foundation's budget, it was moved to Billman's own home in Orange County, California, until it was officially dissolved in December, 2009. The goal of the archive was to bring attention to artists who created dance for the camera. During Billman’s research for his encyclopedia Film Choreographers and Dance Directors, he came to realize that he needed a place to assemble all of his research findings. The Academy was eventually home to 2000 magazines, 3,000 videotapes and DVDs, 3000 books, 1500 playbills, and an assortment of photographs, from films, stage musicals, and dance companies. These artifacts covered all styles of dance and genres of movement, martial arts, combat and fighting, ice dance, fencing and swordplay, gymnastics, acrobatic and circus technique, silent film comedy, created for the camera. Many of the holdings have found new homes at the libraries at Chapman University. the University of Nevada at Las Vegas and San Diego State University. Conversations are ongoing with the Billy Rose theater and Jerome Robbins dance collections at Lincoln Center, The Smithsonian and other archives to assure that all of DOF's "treasures" will have new homes.

== Award ceremonies ==
| Year | Date | Venue | City |
|---|---|---|---|
| 1994 | September 18, 1994 | Club Tatou | Beverly Hills |
| 1995 | October 15, 1995 | Century City Club | Century City |
| 1996 | September 30, 1996 | The Museum of Flying | Santa Monica |
| 1997 | November 9, 1997 | The Hollywood Palace | Hollywood |
| 1998 | October 18, 1998 | Wilshire Ebell Theatre | Los Angeles |
| 2000 | September 13, 2000 | Alex Theatre | Glendale |
| 2001 | October 14, 2001 | El Capitan Theatre | Hollywood |
| 2002 | October 20, 2002 | El Capitan Theatre | Hollywood |
| 2003 | November 9, 2003 | Orpheum Theatre | Los Angeles |
| 2004 | October 17, 2004 | Orpheum Theatre | Los Angeles |
