= Cathie Pelletier =

American novelist

- Born: January 1953 (age 73); Allagash, Maine, U.S.
- Education: University of Maine at Fort Kent
- Occupation: Writer
- Writing career
- Pen name: K.C McKinnon
- Period: Present
- Genre: Literary fiction
- Website: cathiepelletier.com

Cathie Pelletier (born January 1953) is a novelist and songwriter who was born and raised in Allagash, a rural town in Aroostook County, Maine, United States.

Pelletier also writes under the pseudonym K.C. McKinnon.

== Biography ==
Pelletier displayed such aptitude as a student that she was advanced two grades (the sixth grade and her senior year), graduating high school at the age of sixteen. Pelletier wore brash clothes that she claimed were "an outlet for her creativity." At seventeen years she was expelled from the University of Maine at Fort Kent for breaking curfew and pulling a fire alarm. Following her expulsion, she began to hitchhike across the United States. She returned to her alma mater long enough to graduate with a baccalaureate before departing to Nashville in pursuit of a career as a songwriter. Pelletier moved to Tennessee where she met the country music star Jim Glaser. The two lived together for seventeen years until they separated. She then married European-born hotel manager, Tom Viorikic, three months after they met in Canada.

== Career ==
While living in Tennessee Pelletier wrote her first novel, The Funeral Makers. Since then she has penned a number of works, some of which were published under her pseudonym, K.C. McKinnon. In 1998, Pelletier made international news after receiving a million-dollar advance from Doubleday for her novel Candles on Bay Street, a work that was translated into ten languages and made into a film. She has been the recipient of the New England Book Award for Fiction and the 2006 Paterson Prize. Pelletier has acted as the literary agent for several published books.

== Books ==
- Widows Walk (Poetry), 1976
- The Funeral Makers, 1986
- Once Upon a Time on the Banks, 1989
- The Weight of Winter, 1991
- The Bubble Reputation, 1993
- A Marriage Made at Woodstock., 1994
- Beaming Sonny Home, 1996
- Running the Bulls, 2005
- The One-Way Bridge, 2013
- The Summer Experiment, 2014
- Northeaster, 2023

== Books under K.C. McKinnon ==
- Dancing at the Harvest Moon, 1997
- Candles on Bay Street, 1998

== Joint works ==
- A Country Music Christmas, 1997
- The Christmas Note with Skeeter Davis, 1997
- The Ragin' Cajun with fiddler Doug Kershaw
- Proving Einstein Right: The Daring Expeditions that Changed How We Look at the Universe, with S. James Gates, (2019) ISBN 978-1541762251.
