= Henry G. Sanders =

American actor (born 1942)

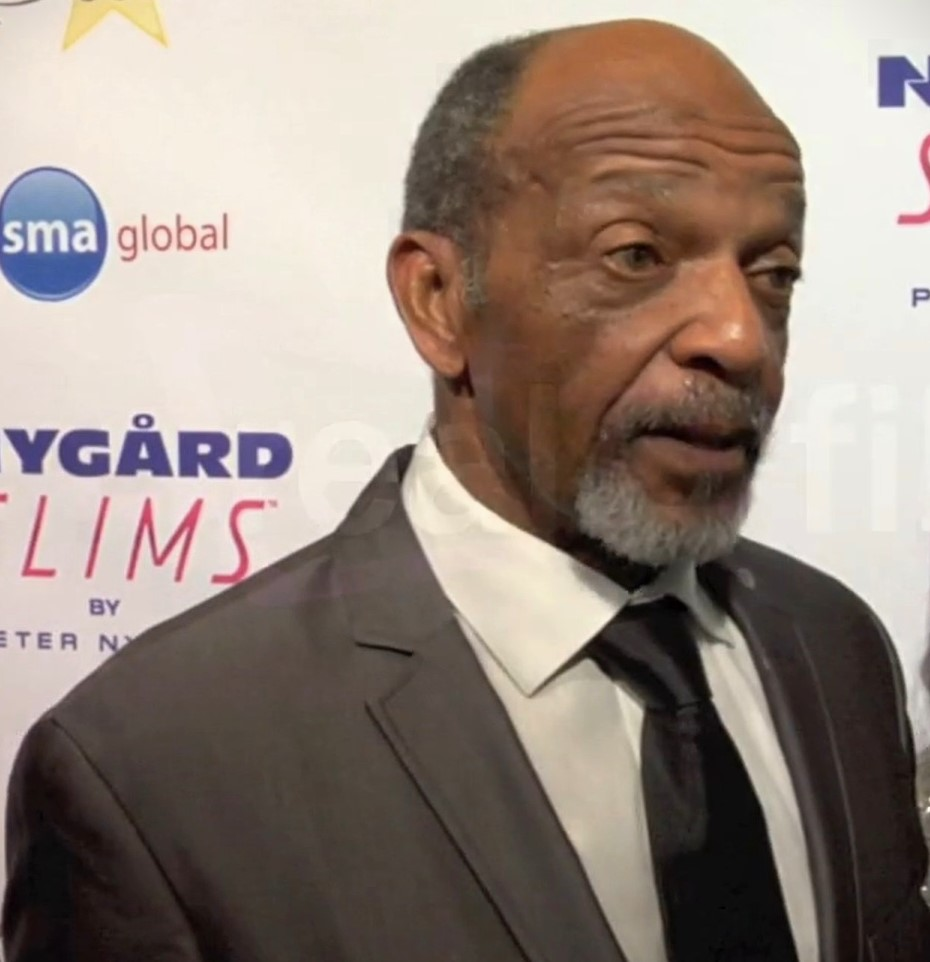
- Sanders in 2015
- Born: Henry Gale Sanders; August 18, 1942 (age 84); Houston, Texas, United States
- Occupation: Actor

Henry Gale Sanders (born August 18, 1942) is an American actor best known for his role in Charles Burnett's 1977 neo-realist film Killer of Sheep. He has also appeared extensively on television, on such programs as The Rockford Files, Tenspeed and Brown Shoe, Knight Rider, Knots Landing, Miami Vice, Cagney & Lacey, Married... with Children, Dr. Quinn, Medicine Woman, NYPD Blue, and The Mentalist.

== Filmography ==
- No Place to Hide (1970) - James Henderson
- The Devil's Garden (1973) - Cult Member with Cigar
- The Black Godfather (1974)
- Baby Needs a New Pair of Shoes (1974) - Sam Kingston
- Independence Day (1976) - Charles
- Panama Red (1976) - John
- The Boss' Son (1978) - Charles
- Killer of Sheep (1978) - Stan
- Circle of Power (1981) - Harold
- Hard Country (1981) - Man Customer
- Endangered Species (1982) - Dr. Ross
- Deadly Sunday (1982) - Johnny
- Breathless (1983) - Man with Pipe
- My Brother's Wedding (1983) - Beat-up man
- Weekend Pass (1984) - Officer Henry
- Night Court (1984) - Leo Bell
- Choose Me (1984) - Hospital Administrator
- Heartbreakers (1984) - Reuben
- Badge of the Assassin (1985) - Foreman #2
- The Ladies Club (1986) - Cop No. 3
- Matlock: The Professor (1986) - Willie Gaines
- Made in Heaven (1987) - Henry
- No Man's Land (1987) - Heath
- Bull Durham (1988) - Sandy
- Rainbow Drive (1990)
- The Man Inside (1990) - Evans
- Child's Play 3 (1991) - Major
- Kuffs (1992) - Building Owner
- Dr. Quinn Medicine Woman(1993-1998) - Robert E.
- Carnival of Souls (1998) - Officer Soby
- Play It to the Bone (1999) - Cesar's Trainer
- Manhood (2003) - Police Officer
- The West Wing (2003) - Ambassador Tiki
- Berkeley (2005) - Gadsen
- Rocky Balboa (2006) - Martin
- Blues (2008) - Pop Boudreaux
- You Again (2010) - Chaplain
- CSI: Crime Scene Investigation (2010, TV Series) - Bill Gibson
- The Mentalist (2011) - Willie Shubert
- American Horror Story: Asylum (2012) - Willie
- 42 (2013) - Max (uncredited)
- Grey's Anatomy (2013) - Dr. Hudson
- Whiplash (2014) - Red Henderson
- Crimes of the Mind (2014) - Judge Maynard
- Selma (2014) - Cager Lee
- American Horror Story: Hotel (2015)
- Blue: The American Dream (2016) - China Banks
- Hap and Leonard (2016–2017, TV Series) - Uncle Chester
- Queen Sugar (2016–2022, TV Series) - Prosper Denton
- Roman J. Israel, Esq. (2017) - Pastor Jack
- 9-1-1 (2019) - Samuel Carter
- Charming the Hearts of Men (2021) - Abel
- Samaritan (2022) - Arthur Holloway
