= Berkeley (film) =

2005 film by Bobby Roth

- Directed by: Bobby Roth
- Written by: Bobby Roth
- Produced by: Lon Bender; Cosmas Paul Bolger Jr. Larison Clark; Bobby Roth; Jeffrey White
- Starring: Nick Roth; Laura Jordan; Tom Morello; Bonnie Bedelia
- Cinematography: Steve Burns
- Edited by: Carsten Becker; Emily Wallin
- Music by: Christopher Franke
- Distributed by: Jeffrey White Productions
- Release dates: October 8, 2005 (Mill Valley Film Festival); October 12, 2007 (United States)
- Country: United States
- Language: English

Berkeley is a 2005 American drama film by Bobby Roth filmed in Berkeley, California. It stars Nick Roth, Laura Jordan, and Henry Winkler.

== Synopsis ==
In 1968, an accounting student at UC Berkeley named Ben avoids the draft and enjoys sex, drugs and rock 'n' roll while protesting against the Vietnam War with his friends.

== Cast ==
- Nick Roth as Ben Sweet
- Henry Winkler as Sy Sweet, Ben's father
- Laura Jordan as Sadie
- Bonnie Bedelia as Professor Hawkins
