= Manhood (2003 film) =

- Directed by: Bobby Roth
- Written by: Bobby Roth
- Produced by: Jack Baran; Bobby Roth; Jeffrey White
- Starring: Néstor Carbonell; John Ritter; Janeane Garofalo; Anthony LaPaglia
- Cinematography: Steve Burns
- Edited by: Mallory Gottlieb
- Music by: Christopher Franke; Patti Scialfa
- Production company: Jung N Restless Productions
- Distributed by: Showtime Networks
- Release date: January 23, 2003 (Sundance Film Festival)
- Running time: 82 minutes
- Country: United States
- Language: English

Manhood is a 2003 American comedy-drama film directed by Bobby Roth and starring Néstor Carbonell, John Ritter and Janeane Garofalo. It is a sequel to Jack the Dog (2001) and is also the final film starring Ritter to be released in his lifetime.

== Plot ==
Jack (Carbonell) is a former womanizer and fashion photographer who is put in charge of his sister's 17-year-old-son when she leaves to find herself. During her leave, he attempts to revive his career while re-establishing a relationship with his nephew and son. In the midst of all this, Eli (Ritter), his sister's ex-husband moves in after he loses his job.

== Cast ==
- Néstor Carbonell as Jack
- John Ritter as Eli
- Janeane Garofalo as Jill
- Bonnie Bedelia as Alice
- Nick Roth as Charlie
- Traci Lords as Actress

== Awards and nominations ==
Ft. Lauderdale International Film Festival

- Won, "Best American Indie" - Bobby Roth
