= King of Sorrow (film) =

2007 television film

- Written by: Damian Lee; Daniel Matmor
- Directed by: Damian Lee
- Starring: Kim Coates; Lara Daans
- Theme music composer: Steve Raiman
- Country of origin: Canada
- Original language: English

Production
- Producers: Lowell Conn; Damian Lee; Terence Robinson
- Cinematography: David Pelletier
- Editor: Joseph Weadick
- Running time: 95 minutes
- Production company: Alchemist Entertainment

Original release
- Release: April 7, 2008

King of Sorrow is a 2007 Canadian television film starring Kim Coates and Lara Daans; it was written, produced, and directed by Damian Lee. A psychological thriller and love story, it featured the final filmed performance by Chris Penn until Aftermath was released.

== Plot ==
A homicidal, drug-addicted policeman who suffered an abusive childhood develops a relationship with a suicidal psychiatrist.

== Cast ==
- Kim Coates as Steve Serrano
- Lara Daans as Dani Brookes
- Angela Asher as Dr. Dreyfus
- Daniel Matmor as Frank Jennings
- Stefano Pezzetta as Young Steve
- Robert Van Dyke as Steve's Uncle
- Nicole Robert as Old Prostitute
- Robert Norman Smith as John Baker
- Stephanie Moore as Julia Baker
- Sadie LeBlanc as Blondie
- Heidi von Palleske as Dr. Sally Champlain
- Chris Penn as Detective Enola
