= Mowday =

Mowday is a surname. Notable people with the surname include:

- Bruce Mowday, American local historian and politician
- Chris Mowday (born 1981), Australian baseball player
