= List of number-one DVDs of 2003 (UK) =

== Chart history ==
Issue date	Number-one DVD
6 January	The Lord of the Rings: The Fellowship of the Ring
13 January	The Lord of the Rings: The Fellowship of the Ring
20 January	Murder by Numbers
27 January	Men in Black II
3 February	Men in Black II
10 February	Windtalkers
17 February	Eight Legged Freaks
24 February	Eight Legged Freaks
3 March	Pinocchio
10 March	xXx
17 March	Lilo & Stitch
24 March	My Big Fat Greek Wedding
31 March	Signs
7 April	Harry Potter and the Chamber of Secrets
14 April	Harry Potter and the Chamber of Secrets
21 April	Harry Potter and the Chamber of Secrets
28 April	Die Another Day
5 May	Die Another Day
12 May	Die Another Day
19 May	28 Days Later
26 May	8 Mile
2 June	The Animatrix
9 June	Reign of Fire
16 June	Bo' Selecta!
23 June	Once Upon a Time in America
30 June	Gangs of New York
7 July	Treasure Planet
14 July	Daredevil
21 July	Ghost Ship
28 July	Catch Me If You Can
4 August	Chicago
11 August	Johnny English
18 August	The Lord of the Rings: The Two Towers
25 August	The Lord of the Rings: The Two Towers
1 September	The Lord of the Rings: The Two Towers
8 September	The Lord of the Rings: The Two Towers
15 September	Bulletproof Monk
22 September	Stitch! The Movie
29 September	The Matrix
6 October	The Matrix Reloaded
13 October	The Matrix Reloaded
20 October	The Office Season 2
27 October	2 Fast 2 Furious
3 November	The Lion King
10 November	X2: X-Men United
17 November	The Lord of the Rings: The Two Towers
24 November	Bruce Almighty
1 December	Pirates of the Caribbean: The Curse of the Black Pearl
8 December	Pirates of the Caribbean: The Curse of the Black Pearl
15 December	Pirates of the Caribbean: The Curse of the Black Pearl
22 December	Pirates of the Caribbean: The Curse of the Black Pearl
29 December	Grease
