= Hopper Penn =

American actor

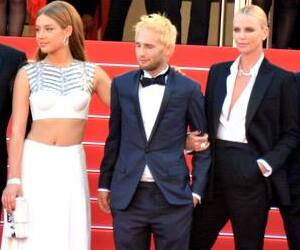
- Penn (middle) alongside Adèle Exarchopoulos (left) and Charlize Theron (right) at the 2016 Cannes Film Festival
- Born: Hopper Jack Penn; August 6, 1993 (age 32); Los Angeles, California, U.S.
- Occupation: Actor
- Years active: 2011–present
- Parents: Sean Penn; Robin Wright
- Relatives: Dylan Penn (sister); Michael Penn (uncle); Chris Penn (uncle); Leo Penn (grandfather); Eileen Ryan (grandmother); Charlie Wright (cousin)

Hopper Jack Penn (born August 6, 1993) is an American actor. He has appeared in the films Signs of Love (2022) and Devil's Peak (2023).

== Early life ==
Penn was born Hopper Jack Penn on August 6, 1993 to actors Sean Penn and Robin Wright in Los Angeles. His elder sister is Dylan Penn. He was named after actors Dennis Hopper and Jack Nicholson. His father almost named him "Steak." Penn has admitted that his parents' "rocky" relationship took a toll on him. He spent his childhood in Ross, California and moved to Los Angeles in 2009, following his parents' separation.

== Career ==
Penn portrayed Morgan Fairchild Williams, the real life cousin of filmmaker Michael Maxxis, opposite Paz de la Huerta and Rosanna Arquette in Maxxis' 2020 film Puppy Love. While preparing for the role, Penn lived with Williams in his apartment.

In 2021, Penn played Nick in Flag Day, which stars his father and his sister.

In 2022, he portrayed Frankie in Signs of Love, in which he reunited with his sister and Arquette.

In 2023, Penn played Jacob McNeely opposite his mother and Billy Bob Thornton in Devil's Peak.

Penn also played the lead in the 2023 short film Let Me Go (The Right Way), which was written by Owen King and Destry Spielberg and directed by the latter.

== Personal life ==
On April 4, 2018, Penn and his then girlfriend, actress Uma von Wittkamp, were arrested in Nebraska for drug possession after police pulled them over for failing to signal. They were taken to Hamilton County Jail in Aurora, Nebraska. Then they were released from jail on April 5 after posting bond. He pleaded no contest to a misdemeanor.

Penn has admitted having an addiction to crystal meth and has gone to rehab. He credits his father for overcoming his drug addiction.

He stated in 2023 that he does not consider himself a nepo baby.

In May 2023, he was photographed with actress Zoe Bleu Sidel, who co-starred with him in Signs of Love.

== Filmography ==
Year	Title	Role	Notes
2011	Back in the Game	Cowboy	Short film
2014	The Men of Santa Muerte	Will	Short film
2015	Endings, Inc.	Rusty	Short film
2016	The Last Face	Billy Boggs	
2017	Life Boat	Unknown	Short film
2017	War Machine	Nick Farrenberg	
2018	Between Worlds	Rick	
2019	The Arrangement	Unknown	Short film
2020	Puppy Love	Morgan	Also producer
2021	Flag Day	Nick Vogel	
2021	The Cleaner	Trent	
2022	Let Me Go the Right Way	Aiden	Short film
2022	Signs of Love	Frankie	
2022	Night of the Cooters	Sweets	Short film
2023	Devil's Peak	Jacob	
2023	The Good Mother	Ducky	
