= Zoë Bleu =

American actress

- Born: Zoë Bleu Sidel; 23 October 1994 (age 31); Los Angeles, California, US
- Other names: Zoë Sidel; Zoë Bleu Arquette
- Education: Sarah Lawrence College
- Occupation: Actor
- Years active: 2007–present
- Mother: Rosanna Arquette
- Relatives: Patricia Arquette (aunt); Alexis Arquette (aunt); David Arquette (uncle); Lewis Arquette (grandfather); Cliff Arquette (maternal great-grandfather)

Zoë Bleu Sidel (born 23 October 1994) is an American actress and fashion stylist. The daughter of actress Rosanna Arquette, she made her acting debut in a minor role in Sofia Coppola's Bling Ring (2013) and had her first lead role as Elisabeta/Mina Murray in Luc Besson's Dracula (2025).

== Early life, family, and education ==
Zoë Bleu Sidel was born on 23 October 1994 in Los Angeles, California, and grew up between Laurel Canyon and Big Sur. Her mother is actress Rosanna Arquette and her father is restaurateur and political scientist John Sidel; her parents divorced when she was five.

She is of French-Canadian descent through her maternal grandfather, Lewis Arquette, and her grandmother, Brenda Olivia "Mardi" (née Nowak) is of Jewish heritage, the daughter of a Holocaust survivor from Poland. Her aunt is Patricia Arquette.

Her name means "life" in Greek. She also called herself Zoë Sidel (after her father), Zoë Bleu Sidel, Zoë Bleu Arquette, and Zoë Bleu. And when asked if those names suggest a difficulty in finding her identity, she replied, "Absolutely not, I know very well who I am. But we all have several facets. The current one is Zoë Bleu, which corresponds to my fashion universe, which is a bit wild, a bit eccentric. Zoë is my youth, my childhood."

Bleu attended Sarah Lawrence College, where she studied poetry and art history, focusing on periods from the Renaissance to the Baroque, as well as Medieval art history. At the time, she thought she might one day pursue screenwriting, a dream she still holds, but she didn’t yet feel confident enough to follow that path. Instead, she turned to art to learn about "historical clothing and the spectrum of light that makes up color." In 2012, she became a debutante at the Crillon Ball in Paris.

At age 15, Bleu began studying the Meisner technique, whereby actors must react instinctively to their surroundings. She recalled, "You really need to disrobe yourself and shed all your skin to reveal the most horrible part of yourself." Bleu recalls that her early experiences with acting were deeply shaped by her family. She grew up playing acting techniques games with them, often taking on different characters alongside her mother.

== Career ==
Although she had previously appeared in Sofia Coppola’s The Bling Ring (2013) in a minor role. This was followed by a small uncredited role in Mother, May I Sleep with Danger? (2016), and The Institute (2017).

In 2022, she wrote a short ballet film called Mandrake. She recalled, "It’s inspired by the Butoh dance theatre, which was created by Kazuo Ohno [and Tatsumi Hijikata] in the 1960s in Japan." That same year, she appeared in Signs of Love; alongside her mother, she played a deaf woman named Jane. Prior to the movie, she took acting classes for a few months, which is something she hadn't done since high school. Thanks to this supporting role, as Jena, Johannes Boesiger noticed Bleu and offered her a part in his upcoming film Fly Little Bird (TBA). She then flew to London, where she learned to sing and formed her own band, L’Espiral. During one of her performances, Luc Besson happened to be in the audience. The director had no idea who she was and after the concert, Besson invited her to audition for the role of Dracula film. Without hesitation, she began preparing her lines and took part in numerous screen tests. Around the same time, she decided to move to Paris. Upon her arrival, she went straight to the Sacré-Cœur and prayed to "anyone up there [who] is listening" to let her get a job in France, and a few weeks later, Luc called to confirm that she had the role. Besson recalled. It was only once filming began that Besson discovered Bleu’s connection to Arquette, saying "Talent runs in the family, she has the DNA and she’s worked hard." In 2025, the film titled Dracula was released in theaters in France on July 30, 2025, with Bleu playing the dual role of Elisabeta/Mina Murray, the tragically deceased wife of Vlad/Dracula, and the young woman he finds in 19th-century Paris.

Her performance in Luc Besson’s Dracula is widely noticed. On social media, several sequences from the film go viral and spark trends highlighting, in particular her acting performance. The press, which is divided in its overall assessment of the film, unanimously praises her performance as “captivating", alongside those of Caleb Landry Jones, Christoph Waltz, and Matilda De Angelis.

=== Fashion career ===
In 2016, Bleu walked the runway for her friend David Moses’s label, Moses Gauntlett Cheng, an experience she called "terrifying." She and her fashion collective friends Arielle Chiara and Darius Khonsary created Nautae, which is a Latin term used to describe "a group of sailors." Nautae describe as "unique, fantastical clothing from repurposed materials." She credits her love of fashion as what allowed her to feel at ease with her own body image. She explained the motivation: "Because I didn't feel good in my own skin, I wanted to feel good in the clothes I was wearing." Her style is described as dramatic and "otherworldly, something out of a 'gothic fairy tale.'" She is often asked about her outfits: "People always ask me, 'Where are you going? Is there a Renaissance fair on? What's the occasion?'" and the reason for such style is that: "I like to wear things that are beautiful, it makes me feel beautiful," and described her fashion: "I'm like the child bride, abandoned at the altar, like Miss Havisham. I have cobwebs in my hair and around my heart." Later she released her clothing brand Kaka Kouture. In 2018, she released a brand new label called Wherein I Dwell.

== Personal life ==
Bleu dated actor Jack Kilmer in 2013. In 2023, she began dating actor Hopper Penn.

In 2016, she spoke about struggling with her body image recalling "I’m very short and stubby. I used to think, ‘Why won’t my legs stretch?". This contributed to her decision to turn down her potential first leading role in Gia Coppola’s debut film, Palo Alto (2013), instead she chose to focus on her schoolwork.

In 2015, she collaborated with Ruchira Gupta and her organization, Apne Aap Women Worldwide, which supports victims of sex trafficking in India. Her involvement was deeply personal, as she is a survivor of childhood sexual abuse, Sidel has stated that her primary goal is to help girls find the strength to speak about their experiences and pursue justice, emphasizing that “addressing it” is the most important step.

== Filmography ==
Key
†	Denotes films that have not yet been released

Year	Title	Role	Notes
2007	Battle for Terra	Kima (voice)	Credited as Zoe Sidel
2013	The Bling Ring	School Girl's Friend	Credited as Zoe Sidel
2016	Mother, May I Sleep with Danger?	Vampire Queen	Uncredited role
2017	The Institute	Lucy	Credited as Zoe Sidel
2022	Signs of Love	Jane	Credited as Zoë Bleu Sidel
2023	Gonzo Girl	Rose	Credited as Zoë Bleu Sidel also as Costume Designer
2025	Dracula	Elisabeta/Mina Murray	
TBA	Fly Little Bird †	Judith Silverstein	
