= R. D. Call =

American actor (1950–2020)

- Born: February 16, 1950; Ogden, Utah, U.S.
- Died: February 27, 2020 (aged 70); Layton, Utah, U.S.
- Other name: RD Call
- Occupations: Film, television and stage actor
- Years active: 1977–2020
- Spouse: Nita Nickerson (1972–1981)

Roy Dana Call (February 16, 1950 – February 27, 2020) was an American film and television actor. He appeared in several films including 48 Hrs. (1982), Brewster's Millions (1985), At Close Range (1986), No Man's Land (1987), Colors (1988), Born on the Fourth of July (1989), Young Guns II (1990), State of Grace (1990), Waterworld (1995), Murder by Numbers (2002), Babel (2006), and Into the Wild (2007).

== Life and career ==
Call was born in Ogden, Utah. An early television appearance saw him in a supporting role on an episode of Trapper John, M.D., where he was cast and directed by director Leo Penn. He has since appeared in various films with Leo Penn, Sean Penn, Martin Sheen, Charlie Sheen, and Emilio Estevez, such as At Close Range, Colors, I Am Sam, Into the Wild, Judgment in Berlin, No Man's Land, State of Grace, The Weight of Water, and Young Guns II.

Call has also appeared in several of Walter Hill's films: 48 Hrs. (with Nick Nolte), Brewster's Millions (with John Candy), and Last Man Standing (with Bruce Willis). Other roles have included Babel (with Brad Pitt), Oliver Stone's Born on the Fourth of July (with Tom Cruise), Michael Mann's L.A. Takedown, Murder by Numbers (with Sandra Bullock), and Waterworld (with Kevin Costner).

Television appearances include Burn Notice, Cruel Doubt, the acclaimed CBS series EZ Streets, Murder, She Wrote, Timestalkers, and The X-Files (episode Miracle Man). He played Jude Andrews in Stephen King's Golden Years.

Call's recent stage work includes Blackout (a performance that Variety called "riveting"), The Speed of Darkness, Drift, and Good Bobby.

Call was born into a family that were members of the Church of Jesus Christ of Latter-day Saints. He left that Church in his early teens. He married Nita Nickerson at the Saint Rose of Lima Catholic Church, in Layton, Utah on April 14, 1972. They had no children and divorced in December 1981, but remained life-long friends. He died on February 27, 2020, from complications of back surgery at the age of 70.

== Filmography ==
| Year | Title | Role | Director | Notes |
|---|---|---|---|---|
| 1979 | Barnaby Jones | Walsh | Winrich Kolbe | Episode: "False Witness" |
| 1981 | Hart to Hart | Sgt. Mezzrow | Leo Penn | Episode: “Murder is a drag” |
| 1982 | Little House on the Prairie | Dwayne | Michael Landon | Episode: "He Was Only Twelve: Part 1" |
| 1982 | 48 Hrs. | Duty Sergeant | Walter Hill | |
| 1985 | V | Visitor Bringing Message | Cliff Bole | Episode: "The Champion" |
| 1985 | Trapper John, M.D. | Laundry Truck Driver | Leo Penn | Episode: "The Unholy Ghost" |
| 1985 | Brewster's Millions | Courtroom Guard | Walter Hill | |
| 1986 | At Close Range | Dickie | James Foley | |
| 1986 | The Children of Times Square | Walter - Rival Boss | Curtis Hanson | TV movie |
| 1987 | Timestalkers | Bart | Michael Schultz | TV movie |
| 1987 | No Man's Land | Frank Martin | Peter Werner | |
| 1988 | Colors | Officer Rusty Baines | Dennis Hopper | |
| 1988 | Judgment in Berlin | Stephen N. Raboun | Leo Penn | |
| 1988 | War Party | Posse Member #1 | Franc Roddam | |
| 1988–1989 | Knightwatch | Bates | Various | 3 episodes |
| 1989 | Unconquered | Floyd Petrie, KKK Member | Dick Lowry | TV movie |
| 1989 | L.A. Takedown | Harry Dieter | Michael Mann | TV movie |
| 1989 | Born on the Fourth of July | Chaplain – Vietnam | Oliver Stone | |
| 1990 | Guns of Paradise | Fletcher | Michael Lange | Episode: "Devil's Escort" |
| 1990 | Young Guns II | D.A. Rynerson | Geoff Murphy | |
| 1990 | State of Grace | Pat Nicholson, Frankie's Lieutenant | Phil Joanou | |
| 1991 | Golden Years | Jude Andrews | Various | 7 episodes |
| 1991 | Other People's Money | Arthur | Norman Jewison | |
| 1992 | Cruel Doubt | District Attorney Mitchell Norton | Yves Simoneau | 2 episodes |
| 1993 | Jack Reed: Badge of Honor | Lt. Lloyd Butler | Kevin Connor | TV movie |
| 1993–1998 | Walker, Texas Ranger | Stan Gorman / Dave Kilmer | Michael Preece / Tony Mordente | 2 episodes |
| 1994 | Murder, She Wrote | Joseph Kempinsky | Peter S. Fischer | Episode: "Deadly Assets" |
| 1994 | The X-Files | Sheriff Maurice Daniels | Michael Lange | Episode: "Miracle Man" |
| 1995 | Waterworld | Enforcer | Kevin Reynolds | |
| 1996 | Last Man Standing | Jack McCool | Walter Hill | |
| 1996–1997 | EZ Streets | Michael "Fivers" Dugan | Various | 9 episodes |
| 1998 | The Practice | Det. Morris | Michael Schultz | Episode: "The Pursuit of Dignity" |
| 1998 | Diagnosis: Murder | Eddie Wallace | Christopher Hibler | Episode: "Murder at the Finish Line" |
| 1998 | Logan's War: Bound by Honor | Albert Talgorno | Michael Preece | TV movie |
| 1998 | Malaika | Jack Grant | Marina Martins | |
| 2000 | Family Law | Sergeant Rodriguez | | Episode: "Stealing Home" |
| 2000 | The Weight of Water | Coast Guard Officer | Kathryn Bigelow | |
| 2001 | I Am Sam | Cop at Park | Jessie Nelson | |
| 2002 | Murder by Numbers | Captain Rod Cody | Barbet Schroeder | |
| 2002 | JAG | Master Chief Proctor | Michael Schultz | Episode: "The Killer" |
| 2005 | Supernatural | Sheriff Pierce | David Nutter | Episode: "Pilot" |
| 2005 | The Work and the Glory II: American Zion | Boggs | Sterling Van Wagenen | |
| 2006 | Dark Heart | Finn | Kevin Lewis | |
| 2006 | Babel | FBI Interrogation Officer | Alejandro González Iñárritu | |
| 2006 | The Drop | Interviewer | Kevin Lewis | |
| 2006 | The Work and the Glory III: A House Divided | Boggs | Sterling Van Wagenen | |
| 2007 | Into the Wild | Bull | Sean Penn | |
| 2008 | Adventures in Appletown | Coach Joe | Robert Moresco | |
| 2009 | Follow the Prophet | General Davis | Drew Ann Rosenberg | |
| 2012 | Burn Notice | Quinn | Alfredo Barrios Jr. | Episode: " Unchained" |
| 2012 | Silent Night in Muncie | Michael | Jon D. Wagner | Short |
| 2012 | Perception | Marcus | Stan Harrington | |
| 2014 | Castle | Quinn | Mickey Barbozza | Episode: "For Better or Worse" (as RD Call) |
| 2015 | Rogues of LA | Neal | Stuart Alexander | 3 episodes |
| 2015 | Blue Telescope | John Fortuna | John D. Wagner | |
| 2016 | Code of Honor | Mayor Randolf | Michael Winnick | |
| 2018 | Not a Stranger | Sergeant Fitzgerald | James Russo | (final film role) |

== Awards ==
Call was the winner of the 2010 Action On Film International Film Festival (AOF) "Legends Award".
