= The Farm (2018 film) =

2018 horror film

- Alternative poster featured the film's tagline
- Directed by: Hans Stjernswärd
- Written by: Hans Stjernswärd
- Produced by: Jaime Carbajal
- Starring: Nora Yessayan; Alec Gaylord; Ken Volok
- Cinematography: Egor Povolotskiy
- Edited by: Monge
- Music by: Lisa Liu; Maksim Velichkin
- Production company: Red Hound Films
- Distributed by: Blue Fox Entertainment
- Release dates: November 16, 2018 (U.S. video release); December 14, 2020 (UK limited)
- Running time: 80 minutes
- Country: United States
- Language: English

The Farm is a 2018 American independent cannibal horror film written and directed by Hans Stjernswärd in his feature-length directorial debut. The film stars Nora Yessayan, Alec Gaylord and Ken Volok. The film combines rural horror and exploitation themes, focusing on a young couple who are kidnapped and held in a remote farm where people are treated like animals. The film received a limited international release in the United Kingdom on December 14, 2020.

== Plot ==
Nora and Alec, a couple from Los Angeles, lose their way while driving through the countryside. After stopping at a deserted rest area and later encountering a rude woman whose car has broken down, they continue down the road looking for gas and a place to stay. A brief stop at a diner makes them uncomfortable when a man warns Nora that she is not safe there. Eventually, they rent a small cabin from an odd landlord. That night, while they sleep, a man wearing a sheep mask crawls out from beneath their bed.

Nora wakes up the next morning locked inside a wire cage in a barn. People wearing animal masks move around the property without speaking. She soon realizes that she and Alec have been taken to a remote farm where humans are treated as livestock. The men are kept separately from the women. The men are killed and butchered, and the women are confined in pens where they are made to reproduce and provide milk.

Alec is held with other imprisoned men and witnesses several of them being bludgeoned to death. Their bodies are transported to a slaughterhouse on the property. Nora, meanwhile, meets women who have been held there for years. One captive tells her that the farm's operators watch their victims long before abducting them and that escape is nearly impossible.

After seeing another woman killed and butchered in front of her, Nora loses hope but later regains her resolve when she discovers that Alec is still alive. Injured but determined, he manages to reach her, and together they slip out of the barn. They attempt to escape across the farm, hiding from the masked workers. Alec is eventually caught in a trap and killed, leaving Nora on her own.

Nora frees another captive named Ashley and searches for a way off the property. They find a bus believed to be their only chance of escape. When Nora retrieves the keys and boards the vehicle, they discover that the masked farm members are already inside, waiting. The commune gathers around a table where Nora and Ashley are served as the main course.

== Cast ==
- Nora Yessayan as Nora
- Alec Gaylord as Alec
- Ken Volok as the Landlord
- Kelly Mis as Ashley
- Rob Tisdale as Andrew
- Sandra Cruze as the Waitress

== Production ==
The Farm marked the feature film debut of Swedish director Hans Stjernswärd. He conceived the screenplay while working on a commercial project connected to the animal rights organization People for the Ethical Treatment of Animals (PETA). The film was produced on a limited budget and drew inspiration from controversial works such as Salò, or the 120 Days of Sodom and Caligula, along with American rural horror films including The Texas Chain Saw Massacre and The Hills Have Eyes.

Two exclusive promotional posters for the film were released through Bloody Disgusting.

== Themes ==
On the film DVD's commentary, The Farm is considered an "allegory" that shows humans being treated like farm animals. The film shows people being captured, confined, and used for different purposes, just as animals are on industrial farms. By reversing the roles, it asks viewers to think about cruelty, exploitation, and the ethics of how living beings are treated for food.

== Release ==
The Farm premiered in 2018 and was released on home video Blu-ray on December 20, 2018. It later received a limited international release in the United Kingdom on December 14, 2020.

== Reception ==
The Farm received mixed reviews from critics. Writing for Culture Crypt, a critic noted that the film makes its point clear by showing masked farm workers handling human captives as if they were animals, but without turning the story into an outright lecture. The review suggested that although the theme is easy to recognize, the film does not aggressively push its message. Bloody Disgusting took issue with the pacing, describing the film as slow and uneven. The cinematography received some praise, but the story was described as lacking depth, with important character moments either rushed or left unexplained. Most of the killings happen out of view, which makes the story's main events feel less intense and immediate.

The Horror Syndicate gave the film a score of 4.1 out of 10, calling it dark in mood but criticizing it for not committing fully to either psychological horror or more graphic content. DanXIII of HorrorFuel said the movie felt somewhat familiar but had its own style, noting that it had difficulty combining unsettling visuals with its underlying themes. Gaby Shedwick of Collider wrote that the film shows its message very clearly, without trying to be subtle. The reviewer mentioned that the characters often make poor decisions, but this helps the film show how brutal the story is. The way the events are shown makes the audience feel uneasy, even though it does not feel as realistic as films like The Texas Chain Saw Massacre.

The film holds a 16% audience score on Rotten Tomatoes, indicating that most viewers did not respond positively to it.
