= Black Rainbow =

- Directed by: Mike Hodges
- Written by: Mike Hodges
- Produced by: Geoffrey Helman; John Quested
- Starring: Rosanna Arquette; Jason Robards; Tom Hulce; Mark Joy; Ron Rosenthal; John Bennes
- Cinematography: Gerry Fisher
- Edited by: Malcolm Cooke
- Music by: John Scott
- Production company: Goldcrest Films
- Distributed by: Miramax Films (United States); Palace Pictures (United Kingdom)
- Release date: 1989
- Running time: 103 minutes
- Country: United Kingdom
- Language: English

Black Rainbow is a 1989 British psychological thriller film directed by Mike Hodges and starring Rosanna Arquette, Jason Robards, Tom Hulce, Mark Joy, Ron Rosenthal, and John Bennes. It was filmed in Rock Hill, South Carolina and Charlotte, North Carolina.

== Plot ==
Martha Travis is a medium who hosts a touring clairvoyant show with her alcoholic father Walter, where she helps audience members make contact with deceased relatives. At one meeting, she foretells the violent death of a local factory employee, a whistleblower who was set to reveal corporate malpractice at the plant. Soon, Martha becomes the target of the killer herself. At a subsequent meeting in the town, she appears to identify several other individuals who are set to die or get killed. Gary Wallace, a skeptical local journalist investigating the death, begins following the couple and the story. The story is told in flashback, with the opening scenes showing Wallace searching for the reclusive Martha many years after the events depicted in the main body of the film.

== Cast ==
- Rosanna Arquette as Martha Travis
- Jason Robards as Walter Travis
- Tom Hulce as Gary Wallace
- Mark Joy as Lloyd Harley
- Ron Rosenthal as Lieutenant Irving Weinberg
- John Bennes as Ted Silas
- Linda Pierce as Mary Kuron
- Olek Krupa as Tom Kuron
- Marty Terry as Mrs. Adams
- Ed Grady as Geoff McBain, Editor (credited Ed L. Grady)
- Jon Thompson as Jack Callow
- Helen Baldwin as Eva Callow
- Darla N. Warner as Shirley Harley
- William Brown as Hal Faber
- Rick Warner as Jay Chatwin, Editor
- Dandy Stevenson as Mrs. Koestler
- Georgia Allen as Mrs. Jamais
- Brenda Mitchell as Mrs. Dupont
- Princess Wilson as Mrs. Kimbler
- Mert Hatfield as Mike Braddon
- Mary Ratliff as Eunice Dole
- Judy Simpson as Rachel Sachs
- Kay Joiner as Mrs. Prior
- Elijah Perry as Bud Orwell (credited Jerry Rushing)
- Tate Gardner as Larry Harley
- Christina Taylor as Lilly Harley
- Jeffrey Taylor as Mike Harley
- Corbin Gurkin as Cindy Harley
- Rebecca Riley Hogan as Mrs. Anderson (credited Rebecca Hogan)
- Joyce Leigh Bowden as Nurse Shelly (credited Joyce Bowden-Kirby)
- Wallace Merck as Officer Monroe
- Muse Watson as Police Officer
- Ed Lillard as Pastor On Train
- Ivan Green as Preacher
- Members of Cannon Cathedral Chior of Charlotte as Themselves

== Production ==
Black Rainbow was shot between October and December 1988 in Charlotte, North Carolina.

== Release and reception ==
Although the film received some critical support and is often described as Hodges's best film since Get Carter, it did not get a full release in the UK and US. At the time, the production companies that distributed the film, Palace Films in the United Kingdom and Miramax in the United States, were suffering financially so the film only had a token release. It was shown at theatres overseas as well as at various film festivals.

The film was finally released on videocassette on 9 January 1992 by Media Home Entertainment through Fox Video. In 2005, Trinity Home Entertainment released the film on DVD, but in full screen and without any bonus material. In the UK, Anchor Bay released the film in widescreen and also with a Mike Hodges commentary and snippets of the making of Black Rainbow with the cast and crew. In 2020 the film was restored and released on to Blu-ray by Arrow Video, with Hodges' earlier film The Terminal Man to follow as a Blu-ray release in 2021.

=== Themes ===
Hodges noted in an interview featured on the 2020 Arrow Video Blu-ray release of Black Rainbow his interest in what he terms "bilocation". The writer-director says, "In other words, people are seen in two different places at the same time; that people can be transported lock, stock and barrel to another location." Hodges continues, saying "science is seemingly moving towards the fact that we’ve got parallel universes" and "the deeper we go into it, the more extraordinary it becomes. Life is like that. I think it’s full of all sorts of strange elements, which I love personally."

In his essay "Black Rainbow - A Modest Pot of Gold" on Top 10 Films, Mark Fraser states: "[Mike] Hodges makes sure things are never what they seem, interweaving a conventional plot with multiple suggestions of bilocation and supernatural intervention." When discussing Tom Hulce's performance as investigative journalist Gary Wallace he notes "he is the one person outside of Martha [Travis] most affected by the bilocation events infused throughout the story." The script also "touches upon a number of other themes affecting the human psyche, including religion, economic displacement, environmental degradation and messy family dynamics."
