= Eileen Ryan =

American actress (1927–2022)

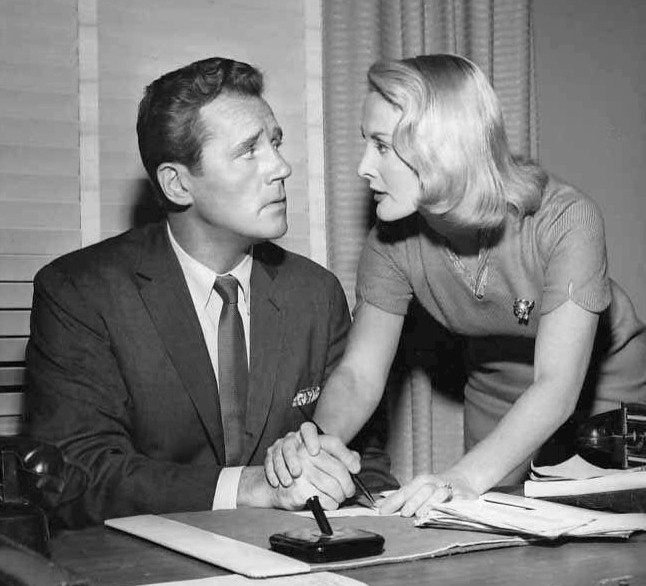
- With Howard Duff in "A World of Difference" from The Twilight Zone, 1960
- Born: Eileen Annucci; October 16, 1927; New York City, U.S.
- Died: October 9, 2022 (aged 94); Malibu, California, U.S.
- Resting place: Holy Cross Cemetery, Culver City, California, U.S.
- Occupation: Actress
- Years active: 1955–2016
- Spouse: Leo Penn (m. 1957; died 1998)
- Children: Michael Penn; Sean Penn; Chris Penn
- Relatives: Dylan Penn (granddaughter); Hopper Penn (grandson)

Eileen Ryan (née Annucci; October 16, 1927 – October 9, 2022) was an American actress. The wife of actor and director Leo Penn, she was the mother of actors Sean Penn and Chris Penn, and of singer Michael Penn.

== Life and career ==
Ryan was born in the Bronx on October 16, 1927. Her father, William, was Italian American and worked as a lawyer and a dentist; her mother, Rose Isabel (née Ryan), was Irish American and employed as a nurse, with her maiden name later chosen by Eileen to be part of her stage name. Ryan studied at New York University, graduating with a bachelor's degree.

== Career ==
Ryan debuted on Broadway in 1953, in the play Sing Till Tomorrow. Five years later, she featured in another Broadway production, Comes a Day. Both plays were ultimately short-lived. She began to reduce her involvement in acting in order to look after her young family, which later relocated to the West Coast. During the 1960s and 1970s, Ryan periodically had small roles in television shows, such as The Twilight Zone, Bonanza, and others directed by her husband Leo Penn.

Ryan resumed acting on a more frequent basis in 1986, when she appeared with her sons Sean and Chris in At Close Range as the brothers' grandmother. She subsequently featured as the mother of Sean Penn's character in Judgment in Berlin (1988), which was directed by her husband. She also starred in Parenthood a year later opposite Jason Robards – whose withdrawal from his role in The Iceman Cometh over three decades earlier enabled Ryan to meet her future husband – before making an appearance in The Crossing Guard (1995), which her son Sean directed. Two years later, she went back to the stage in the play Remembrance, acting alongside her husband in a production by Sean Penn at the Odyssey Theater. Her final role was in the 2016 film Rules Don't Apply.

== Personal life ==
Ryan married Leo Penn in 1957. They met the year before while she was performing in The Iceman Cometh at the Circle in the Square Theatre. At the time, he was an actor and active union member, who was blacklisted from the late 1940s to the late 1950s. They remained married for over 40 years until his death in 1998. Together, they had three children. One of them, Chris, predeceased her in 2006.

== Death ==
Ryan died on October 9, 2022, at her home in Malibu, California, a week before her 95th birthday.

== Filmography ==
=== Film ===
Year	Title	Role	Notes	Ref
1957	Three in One	Mrs. Johnson	Segment: "The Load of Wood"	
1986	At Close Range	Grandma		
1988	Judgment in Berlin	Gerta X		
1989	Winter People	Annie Wright		
1989	Parenthood	Marilyn Buckman		
1991	The Indian Runner	Mrs. Baker		
1993	Benny & Joon	Mrs. Smail		
1995	The Crossing Guard	Woman in Shop		
1999	Anywhere but Here	Lillian		
1999	Magnolia	Mary		
2001	The Pledge	Jean		
2001	I Am Sam	Estelle		
2002	Eight Legged Freaks	Gladys		
2004	The Assassination of Richard Nixon	Marie's mother		
2005	Feast	Grandma		
2006	All the King's Men	Lily Littlepaugh		
2009	Give 'Em Hell, Malone	Gloria		
2009	Mother and Child	Nora		
2010	Venus & Vegas	Estelle		
2011	Collaborator	Betty		
2016	Rules Don't Apply	Frank's Grandmother		

=== Television ===
Year	Title	Role	Notes	Ref
1955	Goodyear Television Playhouse	Alma	"Mr. Dorothy Allen"	
1957	Westinghouse Studio One	Betsy Fuller	"The Defender: Parts 1 & 2"	
1959	Alcoa Presents: One Step Beyond	Mrs. Horvath	"Make Me Not a Witch"	
1960	The Twilight Zone	Nora Reagan	"A World of Difference"	
1960	The Robert Herridge Theater		"With Glory and Honor"	
1960	The Detectives	Mrs. Sharman	"Little Girl Lost"	
1961	The Detectives	Mrs. Coil	"Song of the Guilty Heart"	
1961	The Asphalt Jungle	Anna Ashmond	"The Last Way Out"	
1961	Outlaws	Ruth Lopez	"No Luck on Friday"	
1961	Bonanza	Amanda Gates	"Land Grab"	
1962	Bonanza	Abigail Jones	"The Wooing of Abigail Jones"	
1962	Ben Casey	Laura Walton	"Give My Hands an Epitaph"	
1962	Tales of Wells Fargo	Lorry	"End of a Minor God"	
1972	Bonanza	Emily	"First Love"	
1973	Marcus Welby, M.D.	Shirley Cooper	"Catch a Ring That Isn't There"	
1973	Cannon		"Press Pass to the Slammer"	
1974	Little House on the Prairie	Mrs. Kennedy	"The Voice of Tinker Jones"	
1986	CBS Schoolbreak Special	Bag Lady	"Babies Having Babies"	
1990	Christine Cromwell		"Only the Good Die Young"	
1992	Matlock	Lily Wyckoff	"The Picture: Part 2"	
1993	It's Nothing Personal		TV film	
1996	ER	Barbara Dean	"True Lies"	
1996	NYPD Blue	Mrs. Treet	"He's Not Guilty, He's My Brother"	
1999	Ally McBeal	Bria Tolson	"In Dreams"	
2000	Arliss	Maddie Crowley	"Last Call"	
2001	CSI: Crime Scene Investigation	Mrs. Rose Bennett	"To Halve and to Hold"	
2003	The Brotherhood of Poland, New Hampshire		"Tough Love"	
2005	Without a Trace	Maura O'Connell	"Transitions"	
2011	Men of a Certain Age		"And Then the Bill Comes"	
2011	Private Practice	Marion	"Something Old, Something New"	
2011	Prime Suspect	Susan Whitney	"Bitch"	
2014	Grey's Anatomy	Marjorie Reed	"Puzzle with a Piece Missing"	
2014	Getting On	Mrs. Roth	"No Such Thing as Idealized Genitalia"	
