= Searching for Debra Winger =

- Original poster
- Directed by: Rosanna Arquette
- Cinematography: Jean-Marc Barr
- Edited by: Gail Yasunaga
- Distributed by: Lionsgate (United States and Canada); Minerva Pictures (Italy); Monando Film Distribution (International)
- Release date: July 13, 2002
- Running time: 90 minutes
- Country: United States
- Language: English

Searching for Debra Winger is a 2002 American documentary film conceived and directed by Rosanna Arquette. The film presents an interview with actress Debra Winger about why she suddenly retired from the film industry at the height of her career. It also features interviews with other leading actresses, who discuss the various pressures they face as women working in the film industry as well as their attempts to juggle their professional commitments with their personal responsibilities to their families and themselves. Debra Winger has since returned to acting.

== Inspiration and concept ==
Arquette's inspiration for the project was twofold. The first film she ever saw was The Red Shoes, the story of a woman unable to choose between her dedication to her art and the prospect of lifelong love. The character's emotional struggle left an indelible impact on Arquette. She also was dismayed by Debra Winger's self-imposed retirement from the Hollywood scene (although she has since resumed acting). Curious as to how many other female performers felt pressured to abandon their careers and for what reasons they might opt to do so, Arquette engaged in a lively discussion with many of her peers, either one-on-one or in small groups, and their edited comments resulted in this film.

Winger herself explains her decision to quit acting was not so much a matter of running away from something as it was embracing a personal life she felt she had been missing. She says she's open to the possibility of returning to the screen for the right roles, and since the documentary's release she has worked in a few films, notably Rachel Getting Married which earned her critical acclaim.

== Interviews ==
Roger Ebert is the sole male to be interviewed by Arquette. He expresses his belief that studio executives greenlight projects based on the tastes of adolescent boys and young men, who tend to favor light comedies, laced with bathroom humor, and action films. Neither of these genres offers substantial roles for women, especially older women.

Arquette's other subjects include her sister Patricia Arquette, Emmanuelle Béart, Katrin Cartlidge, Laura Dern, Jane Fonda, Teri Garr, Whoopi Goldberg, Melanie Griffith, Daryl Hannah, Salma Hayek, Holly Hunter, Diane Lane, Kelly Lynch, Julianna Margulies, Chiara Mastroianni, Samantha Mathis, Frances McDormand, Catherine O'Hara, Julia Ormond, Gwyneth Paltrow, Martha Plimpton, Charlotte Rampling, Vanessa Redgrave, Theresa Russell, Meg Ryan, Ally Sheedy, Adrienne Shelly, Sharon Stone, Tracey Ullman, JoBeth Williams, Alfre Woodard, and Robin Wright Penn.

The film was screened out of competition at the 2002 Cannes Film Festival.

== Critical reception ==
David Rooney of Variety observed, "Many of the actresses on tap here provide illuminating insights, intelligence and humor. But while the subject is rich in potential and such high-caliber celebrity access commands an automatic audience, there's no escaping the sensation this could have been a far more revealing experience in the hands of a more savvy, probing interviewer . . . Arquette spends most of her time tossing out adjectives like 'amazing' or banal statements about 'the journey' she's on, making her a rather weak link with her frequently more interesting subjects."

The Entertainment Weekly review of the 2004 DVD release stated, "The dialogue verges on sappy at times and the editing is choppy, but the discussion of universal women's issues is articulate and frank."

On the review aggregator website Rotten Tomatoes, 80% of 5 critics' reviews are positive.
