= Dracula (2025 French film) =

French film directed by Luc Besson

- Theatrical release poster
- Directed by: Luc Besson
- Screenplay by: Luc Besson
- Based on: Dracula by Bram Stoker
- Produced by: Virginie Besson-Silla
- Starring: Caleb Landry Jones; Christoph Waltz; Zoë Bleu; Matilda De Angelis; Ewens Abid; David Shields; Guillaume de Tonquédec
- Cinematography: Colin Wandersman
- Edited by: Lucas "Kub" Fabiani
- Music by: Danny Elfman
- Production companies: Luc Besson Production; EuropaCorp; TF1 Films Production; Société nouvelle de distribution
- Distributed by: SND
- Release date: 30 July 2025 (France)
- Running time: 129 minutes
- Country: France
- Language: English
- Budget: €45 million ($52 million)
- Box office: $42.4 million

Dracula (or Dracula: A Love Tale in select countries) is a 2025 English-language French Gothic romantic fantasy film, written and directed by Luc Besson, based on the 1897 novel Dracula by Bram Stoker. It stars Caleb Landry Jones as Dracula, alongside Christoph Waltz and Zoë Bleu. It was theatrically released in France on 30 July 2025, by SND and had a wide theatrical release in North America on 6 February 2026. The film received mixed critical reviews and positive reviews from audiences, and has currently grossed $42.5 million worldwide on a budget of $52 million. The film received financial support from the CNC.

== Plot ==
The film opens in 1480 AD in Eastern Europe where Prince Vlad of Wallachia lives with his wife, Princess Elisabeta. Vlad and Elisabeta are deeply in love and their relationship is the most important thing in his life.

Vlad is called away to fight the Ottoman Army, who are threatening his kingdom. Before leaving he visits his priest and makes one request, that he will fight in God’s name if he does one thing for Vlad, spare his wife because he cannot go on without her.

Whilst away Elisabeta goes riding outside the castle and is ambushed. Vlad rushes to her aid but is too late, and the princess dies. Overcome with grief Prince Vlad renounces God and states that “until he brings me back my wife, my life no longer belongs to him.” This act ultimately turns him into Dracula.

Over the next four centuries, Dracula attempts to track down the reincarnation of his wife, creating vampiric agents to assist in his search and developing a perfume designed to lure women to him.

In 1889, while negotiating a real estate transaction with the Paris-based solicitor Jonathan Harker, Dracula discovers that Harker's fiancée Mina is the reincarnation he seeks. After imprisoning Harker in his castle with his gargoyle henchmen, Dracula reinvigorates himself with the blood of nuns and heads to Paris, France, in time for the centenary of the French Revolution.

With the help of a vampiric follower called Maria, Dracula tracks Mina down and rekindles their love by galavanting across Paris and reawakening her memories by playing the tune from the old music box he’d once given her. Mina asks Dracula to change her into a vampire so she can spend eternity with him, and the two travel back to Dracula's castle.

Harker escapes and seeks an occultist priest and his associates, who conduct an investigation to locate and kill Dracula. They lay siege to Dracula's castle and Dracula is confronted by the priest, who urges him to repent of his ways lest he condemn Mina to eternal damnation. Dracula allows himself to be staked by the priest and disintegrates in Mina's arms after declaring his eternal love for her.

== Cast ==
- Caleb Landry Jones as Dracula
- Christoph Waltz as the priest
- Zoë Bleu as Elisabeta / Mina Murray
- Guillaume de Tonquédec as Dumont
- Matilda De Angelis as Maria
- Ewens Abid as Jonathan Harker
- Bertrand-Xavier Corbi as Captain Targol
- Thalia Besson as Isabelle
- Raphael Luce as Simon
- David Shields as Henry Spencer

== Production ==
In February 2024, it was announced that an adaptation of the 1897 novel Dracula by Bram Stoker was in development, with Luc Besson directing and writing the screenplay. Caleb Landry Jones and Christoph Waltz joined the cast in lead roles.

Besson said his fascination with the project was not sparked by the story of Dracula, but by actor Jones, with whom he worked in his 2023 film Dogman. Wanting to work with him again, Besson began thinking of other roles that would be suitable for him, and settled on Dracula. "It's a totally romantic approach," Besson says of his adaptation. "There's a romantic side in Bram Stoker's book that hasn't been explored that much. It's a love story about a man who waits for 400 years for the reincarnation of his wife. That's the true heart of the story, waiting an eternity for the return of love". In fact, the love and reincarnation story is absent from Stoker’s novel, where Dracula targets Mina in order to punish the men who opposed him.

In another interview Besson claimed that: "When you take the original novel, it's a real love story. But because at the time [of the novel's release] there wasn't cinema and special effects and all that, people were more pulled in by the fantasy and sanguine aspects [of Dracula]. So he [Dracula] became a horror movie myth when actually, if we dig into the original novel, it's a big love story. So I wanted to go back to this man who loses his wife and who sadly is eternal because God stops him from dying, and he looks for his wife for 400 years."

Luc Besson also admitted: "I'm not a fan of horror films, nor of Dracula". He also stated that he wanted to make a tragic-romantic love story rather than a horror film, even though he kept some horror aspects. What interested him most was to tell the story of Dracula as that of a man who tries for 400 years to find the love of his life.

=== Visual style ===
In terms of the film's visual aesthetics, Besson and cinematographer Colin Wandersman decided as early as pre-production to draw inspiration from Flemish painting and the pictorial technique of chiaroscuro.

=== Costumes ===
The costumes were designed by Corinne Bruand, based on concept art by Patrice Garcia and Luc Besson. In total, 550 costumes were created for the film. After being designed by Besson, Corinne Bruand, and Patrice Garcia, Dracula's armor was crafted by artisan Terry English, who had previously worked with Besson on The Messenger: The Story of Joan of Arc (1999). The soldiers' armor seen in the first part of the film was crafted in London by the team who worked on Game of Thrones.

Elizabeta's gown was made by the Manufacture Royale Bonvallet, near Amiens, in France. The veil of the headdress, which is nearly eight meters long, is a silk organza (the lightest in the world) sourced from Japan. Most of the fabrics were produced by the French workshop BBC Jacquard, based on period drawings.

=== Sets and props ===
The sets were designed by Hugues Tissandier, who has worked on numerous Luc Besson films. Many of the sets were fully built in the studio, including the interior rooms of the castle (unlike the exterior of the castle, which was primarily created using visual effects). The music box, which appears in the film's opening shot and is a significant element in the story, is made of brass. The Baghdad souk was created using 1,500,000 petals meticulously prepared by the film crew. The paintings of Dracula in the grand dining hall serve as an homage, depicting the main actors who have portrayed Dracula in previous adaptations.

=== Make-up ===
The film's make-up was supervised by Julia Floch, Jean-Christophe Spadaccini, and Denis Gastou, who work on most of Luc Besson’s films. A total of 28 people were involved in the make-up department. Making Dracula appear 400 years old in certain scenes was achieved using prosthetic makeup. In total, nearly 200 prosthetics makeup were created for the film, including for Dracula's head, torso, and aged hands. The make-up for scenes in which Caleb Landry Jones portrayed a 400-year-old Dracula required six to seven hours of preparation, while the make-up for Guillaume de Tonquédec, who played the scientist, took up to three hours. The make-up team also created, among other things, 35 fake severed heads of Ottoman soldiers.

=== Filming ===
According to Collider, principal photography began on 27 March 2024, in Kainuu, Finland. The reason for this new shooting location has been reported to be the area's snowy landscapes. Filming lasted from March to July 2024 and took place across several locations, including the Paris region at the Dark Matters studios in Tigery (Essonne). For the exterior sequences, Besson set up his camera in Kuhmo, Finland, and later returned to Paris to film a scene at the Palais-Royal. Production, which began in June 2024 in Paris, had to be rushed ahead of filming restrictions imposed in preparation for the 2024 Olympic Games.

=== Post-production ===
The visual effects were created by MPC Paris. The studio delivered 656 visual effects shots out of the film's more than 1,500 shots, involving 162 artists and technicians. For color grading, Luc Besson worked with Yvans Lucas, who is known for having graded Amélie (Le Fabuleux Destin d’Amélie Poulain), The Bear (L’Ours), and The Big Blue (Le Grand Bleu), the latter also directed by Luc Besson, and also on numerous American films directed by Steven Spielberg, Martin Scorsese, and Quentin Tarantino.

=== Music ===
Danny Elfman began composing the score for Dracula: A Love Tale by creating three main themes. The first, a romantic theme, represents Dracula's love for his lost wife; it is often played on a music box but also has variations with different instruments and rhythms depending on the scene. The second theme is specific to the large dance sequence, while the third aims to convey Dracula's warrior and vampire nature. Once these three main themes were agreed upon, Danny Elfman and Luc Besson collaborated on various musical motifs to express strangeness, mystery, and tension, accompanying the different scenes throughout the story.

=== French poster plagiarism accusation ===
The official French poster of the film (designed by the French distributor SND) came under fire when it turned out that its fangs theme in the whitespace defined by Count Dracula's silhouette image seemingly was copied from a Nosferatu poster designed by Eileen Steinbach of SG Posters, made in May 2024. No complaint has been filed.

== Release ==
The film was released in France on 30 July 2025 by SND and is scheduled to be released in 40 countries or so from August 2025 to February 2026 by various distribution companies. The film was screened in non-competitive section 'Grand public' of the 20th Rome Film Festival and released in Italy on 29 October 2025 by Lucky Red. It is also selected for official competition at Sitges 2025 in Spain.

Signature Entertainment has acquired UK and Irish rights to the film and was released it straight to digital on 1 December 2025. It was re-titled Bram Stoker's Dracula for UK release. It had a wide theatrical release in the United States and Canada on 6 February 2026 by Vertical.

== Reception ==
=== Critical response ===
On the review aggregator website Rotten Tomatoes, 54% of 114 critics' reviews are positive, with an average rating of 5.7/10. The website's consensus reads, "Buoyed by Caleb Landry Jones' haunting lead performance and Danny Elfman's lush score, Dracula reimagines the classic vampire myth as an emotionally charged gothic romance, yet its inconsistent tone holds it back from genre-defining greatness." Metacritic, which uses a weighted average, assigned the film a score of 44 out of 100, based on 21 critics, indicating "mixed or average" reviews. AlloCiné gave the film an average rating of 2.9/5, based on 20 French reviews. Overall press reception is divided.

Some negative reviews have stated that Luc Besson's Dracula is derivative of other film adaptations, specifically Francis Ford Coppola's Dracula (1992). Plot elements from this film it repeats include the presence of Dracula's wife Elisabeta, Dracula renouncing God and becoming a vampire after her death and Mina being her reincarnation. In interviews, Besson described the original Bram Stoker novel as including a love story between Dracula and Mina, as well as a narrative in which Dracula searches for the reincarnation of his wife over centuries. The 1897 novel contains none of these elements (but it is present in Dracula the Un-Dead, an authorized sequel published in 2009, in which Bram Stoker’s novel is presented as a fictionalized and incomplete version of the events).

Conversely, some positive reviews described Luc Besson's Dracula as an original reinterpretation of the classic vampire story, in which the reincarnation of Dracula's wife is truly her past-life self, and Dracula actively seeks to help her recover memories of her former life. Although similarities exist with Coppola's Dracula (1992), such as the romantic connection between Dracula and Mina, these are limited to a few references, according to some critics. Besson uses them to construct a story far more focused on love than Coppola's version, with characters and events unfolding in a manner distinct from previous adaptations, emphasizing romantic devotion over horror and creating a unique and original vision of the Dracula myth. Positive reviews also point out that, for the first time, Dracula’s immortality is portrayed as a source of suffering for him, because of his tragic life after losing his wife and desperately trying to find her again. Commentators highlight the film's visual design, gothic atmosphere and casting performances, and also stated that Caleb Landry Jones's acting (in Luc Besson's version) is radically different from the character conveyed by Gary Oldman (in Coppola's version). They also retain highlighted Danny Elfman's haunting music, the intensely emotional scenes between Mina and Dracula, and that the few intentional humor scenes worked well.

=== Audience response ===
Overall, audience reception proved significantly more positive than that of the press. Across the main rating platforms worldwide, the film generally received higher scores from audiences than from critics. In Russia, the film notably benefited from particularly strong word of mouth despite relatively reserved reviews from local media. A similar situation occurred in Italy. In the United States, audience feedback is also significantly more positive than that of the press.

=== Box office ===
As of 8 March 2026, Dracula has grossed $5.4 million in France, and $36.8 million in other territories, for a worldwide total of $42.5 million. Its largest markets besides France, were the United States ($13 million), Russia ($12.4 million) and Italy ($6.3 million).

The film grossed over $9 million in 10 days in the United States box-office, becoming the biggest success for a French film in the United States since 2017 and the best box office run in the history of American distributor Vertical.

=== Accolades ===
The film received the 2025 Unifrance Prize, which recognizes French films that have received strong international acclaim.

It has received a nomination for best costume design at the 51st César Awards.
