= Signs of Love =

- Film poster
- Directed by: Clarence Fuller
- Written by: Clarence Fuller
- Produced by: David Michaels; Alexander Norton
- Starring: Hopper Jack Penn; Dylan Penn; Zoë Bleu; Rosanna Arquette
- Distributed by: Blue Fox Entertainment
- Release date: June 3, 2022 (Brooklyn)
- Running time: 98 minutes
- Country: United States
- Language: English

Signs of Love is a 2022 American romantic drama film written and directed by Clarence Fuller and starring Hopper Jack Penn, Dylan Penn, Zoë Bleu and Rosanna Arquette. It is Fuller's feature directorial debut.

== Cast ==
- Hopper Jack Penn as Frankie
- Dylan Penn as Patty
- Zoë Bleu as Jane
- Wass Stevens as Michael
- Cree Cawa as Sean
- Jahlil T. Hall as Willy
- Rosanna Arquette as Rosie
- Drew Moore as Mark
- Shannan Wilson as Nancy
- Peter Patrikios as Tim
- David Pridemore as Jarvis

== Production ==
The film was shot in Philadelphia.

== Release ==
In October 2021, it was announced that the worldwide distribution rights to the film were acquired by Blue Fox Entertainment. The film premiered at the Brooklyn Film Festival on June 3, 2022.

== Reception ==
Tara McNamara of Common Sense Media awarded the film two stars out of five.

Roger Moore of Movie Nation wrote that "this cast is top drawer, with Hopper Penn taking his first big lead and running with it, his sister furthering her character-turn trip towards a career and Sidel showing promise beyond the “socialite” label prominently-applied to her profile on the Internet Movie Database."

== Award ==
For his work in the film, Fuller won the Best New Director award at the Brooklyn Film Festival. In November 2022, the Rome Film Fest awarded the film the Corbucci Distribution Prize, consisting of a distribution contract for the Italian market with a P&A budget worth €50,000.
