= Chris Penn =

American actor (1965–2006)

- Penn in Corky Romano (2001)
- Born: Christopher Shannon Penn; October 10, 1965; Los Angeles, California, U.S.
- Died: January 24, 2006 (aged 40); Santa Monica, California, U.S.
- Resting place: Holy Cross Cemetery, Culver City, California, U.S.
- Occupation: Actor
- Years active: 1978–2006
- Partner: Steffiana De La Cruz (1993–1999)
- Parents: Leo Penn (father); Eileen Ryan (mother)
- Relatives: Michael Penn (brother); Sean Penn (brother); Dylan Penn (niece); Hopper Penn (nephew)

Christopher Shannon Penn (October 10, 1965 – January 24, 2006) was an American actor. He was the younger brother of both actor and filmmaker Sean Penn and musician Michael Penn. Noted as a skilled character actor, he was typically cast as a tough character, featured as a villain or a working-class thug, or in a comic role.

Penn had notable parts in such films as All the Right Moves (1983), The Wild Life (1984), Footloose (also 1984), Pale Rider (1985), At Close Range (1986), Reservoir Dogs (1992), True Romance (1993), Short Cuts (also 1993), To Wong Foo, Thanks for Everything! Julie Newmar (1995), The Boys Club (1996), Rush Hour (1998), Corky Romano (2001), and Starsky & Hutch (2004). He won the Volpi Cup for Best Supporting Actor and was nominated for an Independent Spirit Award for Best Male Lead for his performance in The Funeral (1996). He also provided the voice of corrupt cop Edward "Eddie" Pulaski in the action-adventure game Grand Theft Auto: San Andreas (2004).

Penn was found dead in his apartment on January 24, 2006, at the age of 40. An autopsy revealed the primary cause for his death was "nonspecific cardiomyopathy" (cardiovascular disease).

== Early life ==
Christopher Shannon Penn was born on October 10, 1965, in Los Angeles, California, to Leo Penn, an actor and director, and Eileen Ryan (née Annucci), an actress. His paternal grandparents were Jewish immigrants from Lithuania and Russia, and his mother was a Catholic of Italian and Irish descent. His older brothers are actor Sean Penn and musician Michael Penn.

== Career ==
Penn started acting at the age of 12 at the Loft Studio and made his film debut in Charlie and the Talking Buzzard (1979), starring Christopher Hanks. In 1983, he was featured in Francis Ford Coppola's youth drama Rumble Fish and appeared in the high school football drama All the Right Moves as the best friend of Tom Cruise's character. He also appeared in the hit dance movie Footloose (1984) as the best friend of Kevin Bacon's character; played a villain in the Clint Eastwood western Pale Rider (1985); and co-starred with his brother Sean Penn and mother Eileen Ryan in At Close Range (1986).

Penn, who had a black belt in karate, appeared in the motion picture Best of the Best (1989) as Travis Brickley, a cocky member of the U.S. Karate team taking on the team from Korea. The film also starred James Earl Jones, Sally Kirkland, Eric Roberts, Phillip Rhee and Simon Rhee. Penn reprised his role in Best of the Best 2 (1993).

=== 1990s ===
Two of his more memorable performances were in Reservoir Dogs as Nice Guy Eddie and True Romance as Nicky Dimes (both characters in scripts written by Quentin Tarantino). In 1996, he won the award for Best Supporting Actor at the Venice Film Festival for The Funeral.

In 1990, Penn was cast in a season one episode of The Young Riders. He appeared as a villain who is killed by Josh Brolin's character James Butler "Jimmy" Hickok. In Robert Altman's ensemble film Short Cuts (1993), Penn played a troubled swimming pool cleaner who is disturbed by his wife's profession, a telephone sex worker who takes calls from clients at home to which Penn's character is sometimes obliged to listen. This leads to very disturbing consequences. In 1995, he played a confused highway patrolman searching for a car with three drag queens (played by Patrick Swayze, Wesley Snipes, and John Leguizamo) in To Wong Foo, Thanks for Everything! Julie Newmar.

Penn appeared in Jay-Z's 1998 music video "Can I Get A..." as a bartender who mixes drinks and dances. He also played the character Clive Cobb in the film Rush Hour (1998).

=== 2000s ===
In 2001, Penn was meant to appear in American Pie 2 as Steve Stifler's father, but his scenes were eventually cut as there was insufficient time to include him in the film's plot. However, they appeared on the deleted scene reel on the DVD release. Penn then went on to co-star opposite Peter Berg as the mafia brothers of Corky in Corky Romano. He also appeared as a fall guy in a criminal conspiracy in Murder by Numbers, alongside Sandra Bullock.

In 2003, he appeared on the Will & Grace episode "Fanilow", as Barry Manilow's tour director and a character who is interested romantically in Will. Penn was featured in an episode of the television crime drama Law & Order: Criminal Intent ("Death Roe") during the 2004–2005 season. He was also featured on the 2004 video game Grand Theft Auto: San Andreas as the voice of crooked officer Eddie Pulaski. Penn played himself on a 2005 episode of the HBO series Entourage. He appeared in The Darwin Awards, which premiered at the Sundance Film Festival the day after his death.

== Death ==
Penn was found dead in his Santa Monica apartment on January 24, 2006, at the age of 40. An autopsy and subsequent toxicology report performed by Los Angeles County Department of Medical Examiner revealed the primary cause of death was cardiovascular disease. The report also noted that the prescription drug promethazine with codeine and an enlarged heart were possible contributing factors to his death. The toxicology report revealed that Valium, morphine, marijuana and an elevated level of codeine were found in his bloodstream. Penn gained considerable weight throughout the 1990s. Sean Penn said in an interview on Larry King Live that his brother probably died because of his weight.

Penn's grave is located at Holy Cross Cemetery in Culver City, California.

== Filmography ==
=== Film ===
Year	Title	Role	Notes
1979	Charlie and the Talking Buzzard	Pete	Credited as Christopher Penn (debut role)
1983	All the Right Moves	Brian Riley	Credited as Christopher Penn
1983	Rumble Fish	B.J. Jackson	Credited as Christopher Penn
1983	Nobody's Heroes	N/A	Director/Producer/Writer
1984	Footloose	Willard Hewitt	Credited as Christopher Penn
1984	The Wild Life	Tom Drake	Credited as Christopher Penn
1985	Pale Rider	Josh LaHood	Credited as Christopher Penn
1986	At Close Range	Tommy	Credited as Christopher Penn
1987	Made in U.S.A.	Tuck	Credited as Christopher Penn
1989	Return from the River Kwai	Lieutenant Crawford	Credited as Christopher Penn
1989	Best of the Best	Travis Brickley	Credited as Christopher Penn
1991	Mobsters	Tommy Reina	Credited as Christopher Penn
1991	Leather Jackets	Steve 'Big Steve'	Credited as Christopher Penn
1991	Future Kick	'Bang'	
1992	Reservoir Dogs	Eddie 'Nice Guy Eddie' Cabot	
1993	Best of the Best II	Travis Brickley	Credited as Christopher Penn
1993	The Music of Chance	Floyd	
1993	The Pickle	Gregory Stone	
1993	Short Cuts	Jerry Kaiser	
1993	True Romance	Detective Nicky Dimes	
1993	Josh and S.A.M.	Derek Baxter	
1993	Beethoven's 2nd	Floyd	
1994	Imaginary Crimes	Jarvis	
1995	Fist of the North Star	'Jackal'	
1995	To Wong Foo Thanks for Everything, Julie Newmar	Sheriff Dollard	
1995	Under the Hula Moon	'Turk' Dickson	
1995	Sacred Cargo	Vince Kanevsky	
1996	Mulholland Falls	Detective Arthur Relyea	
1996	The Funeral	'Chez'	Nominated – Film Independent Spirit Award for Best Male Lead
1996	The Boys Club	Luke	
1997	Deceiver	Detective Philip Braxton	
1998	Papertrail	FBI Agent Jason Enola	
1998	One Tough Cop	Duke Finnerly	
1998	Rush Hour	Clive	
1998	Family Attraction	Father	Short film
1999	The Florentine	Bobby	
2000	Cement	Bill Holt	
2001	Kiss Kiss (Bang Bang)	Bubba	
2001	Corky Romano	Peter Romano	
2002	Murder by Numbers	Ray	
2002	Redemption	Tony Leggio	Direct-to-video
2002	Stealing Harvard	David Loach	
2003	American Pie: Beneath the Crust Vol. 2	Stiffler's Dad	Deleted scenes
2003	Masked and Anonymous	Crew Guy #2	
2003	Shelter Island	Sheriff DeLuca	
2004	Starsky & Hutch	Manetti	
2004	After the Sunset	Rowdy Fan	
2006	The Darwin Awards	Tom Andy	Posthumous release
2006	Juarez: Stages of Fear	Unknown Role	Direct-to-video; posthumous release, also executive producer
2006	Holly	Freddie Vibal	Posthumous release
2007	King of Sorrow	Detective Enola	Posthumous release
2013	Aftermath	Tony Bricker	Filmed in 2005; posthumous release (final film role)

=== Television ===
Year	Title	Role	Notes
1982	Magnum, P.I.	Wounded Soldier in Vietnam	Episode: "Heal Thyself"; credited as Christopher Penn
1985	North Beach and Rawhide	Dan Donnelly	TV movie
1987	Faerie Tale Theatre	Will Tussennbrook	Episode: "Rip Van Winkle"; credited as Christopher Penn
1990	The Young Riders	Brad Enright	Episode: "Matched Pair"
1995	Chicago Hope	Kevin Fitzpatrick	Episode: "Life Support"
1996	Dead Man's Walk	Charles Goodnight	Miniseries Episode: "#1.2"
2002	AFP: American Fighter Pilot	Narrator	Voice role
2003	CSI: Miami	Pete Wilton	Episode: "Grave Young Men"
2003	The Brotherhood of Poland, New Hampshire	Waylon Shaw	Series regular (6 episodes)
2003	Will & Grace	Rudy	Episode: "Fanilow"
2005	Law & Order: Criminal Intent	Tommy Onerato	Episode: "Death Roe"
2005	Everwood	Frank Sullivan	Episode: "Fate Accomplis"
2005	Entourage	Chris Penn (Himself)	Episode: "An Offer Refused"

=== Music videos ===
Year	Title	Role	Artist
1991	"Date Rape"	Perpetrator	Sublime
1995	"Somebody's Crying"	Beachgoer	Chris Isaak
1998	"Can I Get A..."	Bartender	Jay-Z feat. Ja Rule & Amil

=== Video games ===
Year	Title	Role	Notes
2004	Grand Theft Auto: San Andreas	Officer Edward "Eddie" Pulaski	
2021	Grand Theft Auto: The Trilogy - The Definitive Edition	Officer Edward "Eddie" Pulaski	Archival recordings Remaster of Grand Theft Auto: San Andreas only
