= Flag Day (film) =

2021 film by Sean Penn

- Theatrical release poster
- Directed by: Sean Penn
- Screenplay by: Jez Butterworth; John-Henry Butterworth
- Based on: Flim-Flam Man: A True Family History by Jennifer Vogel
- Produced by: William Horberg; Jon Kilik; Fernando Sulichin
- Starring: Dylan Penn; Sean Penn; Josh Brolin
- Cinematography: Daniel Moder
- Edited by: Valdís Óskarsdóttir; Michelle Tesoro
- Music by: Joseph Vitarelli
- Production companies: Conqueror Productions; Olive Hill Media; Wonderful Films
- Distributed by: Metro-Goldwyn-Mayer Pictures (through United Artists Releasing)
- Release dates: July 10, 2021 (Cannes); August 20, 2021 (United States)
- Running time: 108 minutes
- Country: United States
- Language: English
- Box office: $1.4 million

Flag Day is a 2021 American drama film directed by and starring Sean Penn based on Jennifer Vogel's 2004 memoir, Flim-Flam Man: A True Family History. It premiered in competition at the 2021 Cannes Film Festival and was released in cinemas on August 20, 2021 by United Artists Releasing. The film has received mixed reviews from critics.

== Premise ==
The daughter of a con artist struggles to come to terms with her father's past, involving the fourth-largest seizure of counterfeit bills in U.S. history, nearly $20 million.

== Cast ==
- Dylan Penn as Jennifer Vogel
  - Jadyn Rylee as teenage Jennifer
  - Addison Tymec as younger Jennifer
- Sean Penn as John Vogel
- Katheryn Winnick as Patty Vogel
- Josh Brolin as Uncle Beck
- Hopper Penn as Nick Vogel
  - Beckam Crawford as Nick as a younger child
- Regina King as U.S. Marshall Blake
- Norbert Leo Butz as Doc
- Dale Dickey as Grandma Margaret
- Eddie Marsan as Mr. Emmanuelle
- Bailey Noble as Debbie

== Production ==
In March 2012, Penn expressed interest in joining the cast of a Flim-Flam Man film adaptation directed by Alejandro González Iñárritu.

It was announced in March 2019 that a casting call for the film had been issued, with filming for the project due to commence in Winnipeg, Canada.

Filming began in June with the cast including Penn and his children Dylan Penn and Hopper Penn. Josh Brolin, Miles Teller and Katheryn Winnick were also among the cast announced. In July 2019, James Russo was confirmed as part of the cast. On August 1, 2019, scenes were filmed at the Fort Garry campus of the University of Manitoba. Filming took place at Piedras Blancas in San Luis Obispo County, California.

The film was produced by William Horberg, Jon Kilik and Fernando Sulichin.

In an interview with Deadline Hollywood at the 2021 Cannes Film Festival, Penn said that he initially thought that it would be something he might act in, but after trouble identifying the right director he took on the offer as it was a movie that he would have liked to see get made. It is the first film directed by Penn in which he also appears.

== Release ==
The film had its world premiere at the Cannes Film Festival in July 2021. Prior to the festival, Metro-Goldwyn-Mayer acquired North American distribution rights to the film, with plans to release it later that year through their joint venture, United Artists Releasing. It was released on August 20, 2021. It was previously scheduled to be released on August 14, but moved back a week to avoid competing with another MGM film, Respect.

== Soundtrack ==
The soundtrack to Flag Day features original music by Eddie Vedder, Glen Hansard and Cat Power. The first single, "My Father's Daughter" marks the musical debut of Vedder's then-17-year-old daughter Olivia, who also sings lead on the song "There's a Girl". The album with the thirteen-track soundtrack was released on August 20, 2021.

No.	Title	Writer(s)	Producer(s)	Length
1.	"My Father's Daughter" (Eddie Vedder, Glen Hansard and Olivia Vedder)	Eddie Vedder; Glen Hansard	David Odlum	2:50
2.	"Flag Day" (Eddie Vedder and Glen Hansard)	Vedder; Hansard	Odlum	4:09
3.	"I Think of Angels" (Cat Power)	Kristján Kristjánsson	KK	3:32
4.	"Tender Mercies" (Eddie Vedder and Glen Hansard)	Vedder; Hansard	Odlum; Andrew Watt	3:13
5.	"Rather Be Home" (Eddie Vedder and Glen Hansard)	Vedder; Hansard		3:25
6.	"I Am a Map" (Cat Power)	Chan Marshall	Cat Power	2:01
7.	"As You Did Before" (Glen Hansard)	Vedder; Hansard		4:29
8.	"There's a Girl" (Eddie Vedder, Glen Hansard and Olivia Vedder)	Vedder; Hansard		3:33
9.	"I'll Be Waiting" (Eddie Vedder and Glen Hansard)	Vedder; Hansard	Odlum	2:35
10.	"I Will Follow" (Cat Power)	Marshall	Cat Power	4:48
11.	"Wave" (Eddie Vedder and Glen Hansard)	Vedder; Hansard	Odlum	3:19
12.	"Drive" (Eddie Vedder)	Michael Stipe; Mike Mills; Peter Buck; Bill Berry		4:24
13.	"Dream" (Cat Power)	Marshall	Cat Power	5:22
Total length:				47:48

== Controversy ==
During promotion for the movie, at a time when thousands were dying monthly from the COVID-19 pandemic in the United States, Penn stated he did not want anyone who chose not to be vaccinated against COVID-19 to be allowed to see the movie in theaters, which upset anti-vaxxers.

== Reception ==
=== Box office ===
Flag Day was released in 24 theaters and made $40,750 in its opening weekend. According to Deadline Hollywood, the film was targeting an "older, sophisticated demo." In its initial release, 56% of all audiences were over the age of 55, low numbers that were credited to the Delta variant. The film was screened in 50 theaters in its second weekend.

=== Critical response ===
On the review aggregator website Rotten Tomatoes, 40% of 86 critics' reviews are positive, with an average rating of 5.3/10. The website's consensus reads: "Flag Day benefits from powerful performances and a moving fact-based story, but it's largely lost in the movie's melodramatic din." Metacritic, which uses a weighted average, assigned the film a score of 53 out of 100, based on 24 critics, indicating "mixed or average" reviews.
