= Devil's Peak (film) =

2023 film by Ben Young

- Theatrical release poster
- Directed by: Ben Young
- Written by: Robert Knott
- Based on: Where All Light Tends to Go by David Joy
- Produced by: Griff Furst; Josh Kesselman; Robert Knott; Robin Wright; Jamie Hilton; Sterling Griffin
- Starring: Billy Bob Thornton; Hopper Penn; Katelyn Nacon; Emma Booth; Brian d'Arcy James; Jackie Earle Haley; Robin Wright
- Cinematography: Michael McDermott
- Edited by: Merlin Eden
- Music by: Adam Spark
- Production companies: Curmudgeon Films; Thruline Entertainment
- Distributed by: Screen Media
- Release date: February 17, 2023
- Running time: 98 minutes
- Country: United States
- Language: English

Devil's Peak (originally titled Where All Light Tends to Go) is a 2023 American Southern Gothic crime-thriller film directed by Ben Young, and starring Billy Bob Thornton and Robin Wright. It is based on the novel Where All Light Tends to Go by David Joy.

The film was released in select theaters on February 17, 2023, before releasing on digital on February 24, 2023. It received negative reviews from critics.

== Cast ==
- Billy Bob Thornton as Charlie
- Robin Wright as Virgie
- Hopper Penn as Jacob McNeely
- Katelyn Nacon as Maggie
- Emma Booth as Josephine
- Jackie Earle Haley as Rogers
- Brian d'Arcy James as Bo
- David Kallaway as Gerald Cabe
- Jared Bankens as Jeremy Cabe
- Mark Ashworth as Luke
- Harrison Gilbertson as Bull

== Production ==
Filming began in Atlanta, Georgia on November 1, 2021.

== Reception ==
On Rotten Tomatoes, the film holds an approval rating of 36% based on 22 reviews, with an average rating of 5.1/10. On Metacritic, which uses a weighted average, the film has a score of 38 out of 100 based on 8 critics, indicating "generally unfavorable reviews".

In a review for Variety, Murtada Elfadl praised the film's performances and characters, but says it "crumbles due to Penn's inexperienced performance,” further noting Wright's "dedication" and Thornton's monologues which "he gnaws on with relish". Brian Tallerico for RogerEbert.com gave the film 1 out of 4 stars, considering the film overall "atrocious", Penn's performance "a dour, non-performance that becomes a black hole in the center", Thornton playing a "cartoonish version of menace", and an "excellent" Wright underutilized due to her character.
