= At Close Range =

1986 film by James Foley

- Theatrical release poster
- Directed by: James Foley
- Screenplay by: Nicholas Kazan
- Story by: Elliott Lewitt; Nicholas Kazan
- Produced by: Don Guest; Elliott Lewitt
- Starring: Sean Penn; Christopher Walken; Mary Stuart Masterson; Crispin Glover; Tracey Walter; Chris Penn
- Cinematography: Juan Ruiz Anchía
- Edited by: Howard E. Smith
- Music by: Patrick Leonard
- Production companies: Hemdale Film Corporation; Cinema '85
- Distributed by: Orion Pictures
- Release date: April 18, 1986
- Running time: 115 minutes
- Country: United States
- Language: English
- Budget: US$6.5 million
- Box office: US$2.3 million

At Close Range is a 1986 American independent rural noir crime thriller film directed by James Foley from a screenplay written by Nicholas Kazan, based on the real life rural Pennsylvania crime family led by Bruce Johnston Sr., which occurred during the 1960s and 1970s. It stars Sean Penn and Christopher Walken, with Mary Stuart Masterson, Crispin Glover, Tracey Walter, Chris Penn (then credited as Christopher Penn), Eileen Ryan, David Strathairn and Kiefer Sutherland in supporting roles.

== Plot ==
Brad Whitewood Sr. is a career criminal and leader of his family's gang of rural backwoods criminals. His son, Brad Whitewood Jr., a floundering, out-of-work teenager living in poverty with his mother Julie, grandmother, brother Tommy and mother's boyfriend Ernie, comes to stay with his father. Brad Jr. decides he wants to emulate his father, motivated by his flashy car and wads of $100 bills. At first, Jr. starts a gang with Tommy, fencing their stolen goods through Brad Sr.'s criminal network. Encouraged by his 16-year-old girlfriend, Terry, Brad Jr. seeks full entry into his father's gang but tries to back out after witnessing a murder. Eventually, Brad Jr's gang is arrested while stealing tractors, and the FBI and local law enforcement lean on him to get him to turn against his father.

During Brad Jr.'s time in jail, Brad Sr. becomes convinced that Terry is a risk to his activities, thinking that Brad Jr. may confide incriminating details to Terry. In an attempt to destroy her relationship with Brad Jr., Brad Sr. gets Terry drunk and stoned and rapes her. After a prison visit in which Terry, accompanied by Julie, has a conversation with Jr., it seems that he begins to cooperate with police. The members of Brad Jr.'s gang are subpoenaed, and Brad Sr. feels he needs to eliminate them. His gang kills Lucas, Aggie and Tommy. Brad Jr. and Terry plan to flee to Montana, but they're ambushed. Terry is killed, and Brad Jr. is seriously wounded. Brad Jr. confronts his father armed with his father's gun, intending to kill him, but decides instead to cooperate with police. Ultimately, he takes the witness stand in his father's trial.

== Cast ==
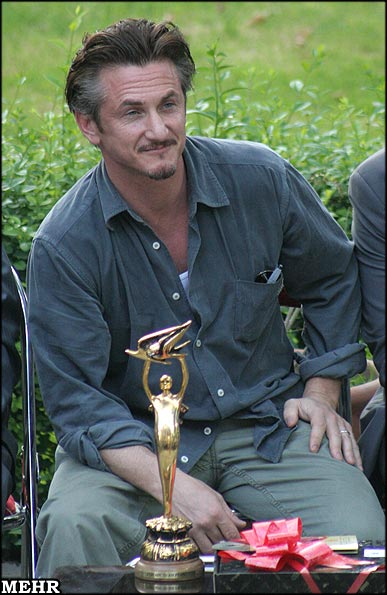
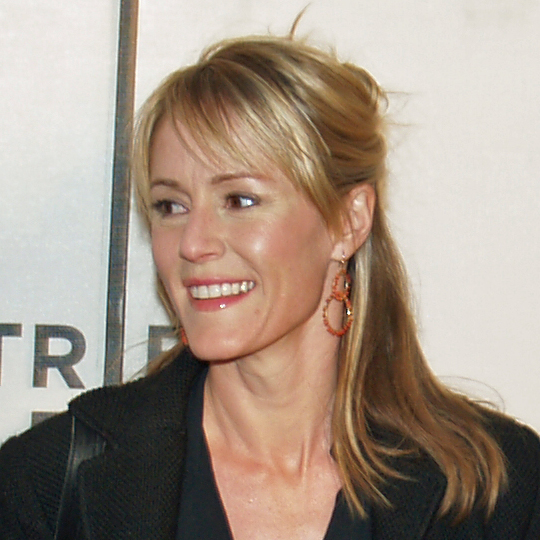
Sean Penn (left) and Mary Stuart Masterson, who respectively play Bradford "Little Brad" Whitewood Jr. and Terry
- Sean Penn as Bradford "Little Brad" Whitewood Jr.
- Christopher Walken as Bradford "Big Brad" Whitewood Sr. (based on Bruce Johnston)
- Mary Stuart Masterson as Terry
- Christopher Penn as Thomas "Tommy" Whitewood
- Millie Perkins as Julie
- Eileen Ryan as Grandma
- Tracey Walter as Uncle Patch Whitewood
- R. D. Call as Dickie
- David Strathairn as Tony Pine
- J. C. Quinn as Boyd
- Candy Clark as Mary Sue Whitewood
- Jake Dengel as Lester
- Kiefer Sutherland as Tim
- Crispin Glover as Lucas
- Stephen Geoffreys as Aggie
- Alan Autry as Ernie
- Noelle Parker as Jill

== Production ==
=== Filming ===
Filming took place on location in and around the city of Franklin, Tennessee, during the summer of 1985.

=== Soundtrack ===
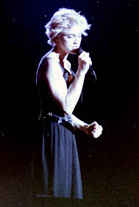
Madonna performing "Live to Tell" during her Who's That Girl World Tour in 1987

Music for the film was composed by Patrick Leonard, who had been working on an instrumental theme for Paramount's 1986 film Fire with Fire, and wanted to enlist Madonna for the vocals. Leonard was turned down by Paramount for that project, but Madonna, who was at the time married to Sean Penn, decided that the theme would work well for At Close Range. She wrote the lyrics and presented a demo cassette to director James Foley, and suggested Leonard compose the film's soundtrack. The theme with Madonna's lyrics became the single "Live to Tell". A slower instrumental version opened the film's main title sequence, a harbinger of the end credit sequence, which was accompanied by the version from Madonna's third studio album, True Blue (1986). Versions of the instrumental show up throughout. The instrumental film score by Leonard remained unreleased until a version of the main titles appeared on the Internet in 2014, although the 7" single of "Live to Tell" included a B-side incomplete instrumental version of the score.

The music featuring in the film included a number of popular songs from the late 1970s, including "Miss You" by The Rolling Stones, "Boogie Oogie Oogie" by A Taste of Honey, as well as a number of arrangements featuring LeRoux.

== Release ==
At Close Range was theatrically released by Orion Pictures on April 18, 1986, in the United States.

== Home media ==
At Close Range was released on VHS by Vestron Video on October 29, 1986, in the United States.

== Reception ==
=== Box office ===
The film was not profitable at the box office during its theatrical run. It grossed a total of $2,347,000 at the North American box office during its theatrical run in 83 theaters, earning less than its budget of $6.5 million.

=== Critical response ===
On the review aggregator website Rotten Tomatoes, 88% of 24 critics' reviews are positive. Metacritic, which uses a weighted average, assigned the film a score of 67 out of 100, based on nine critics, indicating "generally favorable" reviews. Audiences polled by CinemaScore gave the film an average grade of "C" on an A+ to F scale.

Roger Ebert gave it 3½ out of 4 stars, noting that "few recent films have painted such a bleak picture of human nature". He described Sean Penn as "probably the best of the younger actors", while lauding Christopher Walken's "hateful" performance.

=== Accolades ===
- Nominated Golden Bear, 36th Berlin International Film Festival.
- Winner ASCAP Film & Television Music Award – Most Performed Song from a Motion Picture ("Live to Tell"); awarded to Madonna
- Winner BMI Film & TV Award – Most Performed Song from a Film ("Live to Tell"); awarded to Patrick Leonard
- Nominated Casting Society of America – Best Casting in Feature Film (Risa Bramon Garcia, Billy Hopkins)

== See also ==
- List of American films of 1986
- Bruce Johnston Sr.
