= Puppy Love (2020 film) =

- Theatrical poster
- Directed by: Michael Maxxis
- Written by: Michael Maxxis
- Produced by: David Michaels; George Parra; Nicolette Saina
- Starring: Hopper Penn; Paz de la Huerta
- Release date: September 2020 (Oldenburg)
- Running time: 110 minutes
- Country: Canada
- Language: English
- Budget: $3 million

Puppy Love is a 2020 Canadian comedy drama film written and directed by Michael Maxxis in his feature directorial debut, and starring Hopper Penn and Paz de la Huerta. It is based on a year in the life of Maxxis’ male cousin Morgan Fairchild.

== Cast ==
- Hopper Penn as Morgan
- Paz de la Huerta as Carla
- Michael Madsen as Wesley
- Donald Cerrone as Danny
- Rosanna Arquette as Deb
- Mickey Avalon as Kenny
- Wayne Newton as Marshall

== Production ==
The film was shot in Edmonton in March 2017. Elle King was attached to appear in the film.

When preparing for the role Penn lived with Morgan Fairchild in the latter’s apartment.

== Release ==
The film premiered at the Oldenburg International Film Festival in September 2020. The film was also screened at the Santa Fe International Film Festival on October 16, 2020. It was also screened at the San Francisco Independent Film Festival on February 4, 2021.

== Awards ==
At the Oldenburg Film Festival, the film won the German Independence Award — Spirit of Cinema and de la Huerta won the Seymour Cassel Award for Best Actress.
