= Bruce Johnston (criminal) =

American gangster and murderer

Bruce Johnston Sr.
- Born: Bruce Alfred Johnston; March 27, 1939; Wooster, Ohio, U.S.
- Died: August 8, 2002 (aged 63); Graterford, Pennsylvania, U.S.
- Children: Bruce Jr. (born 1959) James "Jimmy" Johnston (born 1960)
- Parent(s): Louise Johnston (nee Price) and Passmore Johnston.
- Relatives: sister: Mary Payne (born 1943) brothers: David (born 1947); Norman (born 1950); Manuel (paternal); James, Jr. (paternal)
- Criminal charges: Murder of five, attempted murder and theft
- Penalty: 6 consecutive life sentences

Bruce Alfred Johnston Sr. (March 27, 1939 – August 8, 2002) was the leader of one of the most notorious gangs in the history of Pennsylvania. The gang started in the 1960s and was rounded up in 1978 after his son, Bruce Jr., testified against him. The 1986 film At Close Range is based on Johnston's gang.

== Early years ==
Bruce Johnston was a son of Louise and James Johnston Sr. Along with his brother James Jr., he was raised by his grandmother Harriet Steffy and great aunt Sarah Martin.

Neither of Bruce's sons started associating with their father until a few years before Bruce began his criminal activities.

== Gang ==
He founded and led the Johnston Gang, which had a wide network and operated primarily in Chester County, according to a 1980 Pennsylvania Crime Commission report. He and the Johnston Gang, which included his brothers David and Norman, also committed crimes in Lancaster County on several occasions and crossed state lines into neighboring Maryland and Delaware. They primarily engaged in theft: stealing jewelry, cash, and other valuables from safes; farm and lawn tractors; sports equipment; antiques and cars from country estates; and other items that could be sold off for profit.

In each break-in or theft, gang members used their skills in picking locks, cracking safes, and disarming or averting security systems. They used walkie-talkies and police scanners. While doing a job in one part of the county, they would divert the state police by making a false report of criminal activities elsewhere.

Bruce, David, and Norman Johnston were referred to by neighbors as the "bad Johnston brothers", while three other brothers were known as the "good Johnstons".

=== Gang members ===
- Bruce Johnston Sr., gang leader
- David Johnston
- Norman Johnston
- Richard Mitchell, who later became a witness for the State
- James Griffin, who later became a witness for the State
- Edward Otter
- Davis Schonely
- Leslie Dale, who later became a witness for the State
- Gary Wayne Crouch, informant who was murdered by the gang
- Richard Donnell, who was believed to have drowned fellow gang member Jack W. Baen
- Roy Meyers, who later became a witness for the State
- Jack W. Baen, who drowned in 1970; murder charges were filed against Leslie Dale and Richard Donnell
- Francis Matherly
- Ancell E. Hamm, who killed William Davis and Richard Posey, two police officers of the Kennett Square Police Department, in 1972 and was sentenced to two consecutive life terms. He was also one of the earliest Johnston Gang members who was convicted.

== Chronology of crimes ==
=== 1971 ===
In August 1971, the gang targeted the Dutch Wonderland theme park on Lincoln Highway East. The police believe that the main culprits were David, Norman, and Bruce Sr., and that they got away with $33,000 worth of cash and property.

=== 1972 ===
Ancell E. Hamm murdered two Kennett Square patrolmen. As a result, police began intensively investigating the gang's activities.

=== 1975 ===
The gang broke into the shop at Media Heights Country Club in Lancaster, PA. They drilled holes in the side of the shop and disarmed the alarm system, and used dynamite to gain access to a safe. They made off with $15,000 in money and golf equipment, none of which was ever recovered.

=== 1976 ===
Janet Gazzerro and her husband Frank were convicted of bribing a juror in the Chester County Common Pleas Court where Bruce Johnston Sr. and others were accused of the theft of a tractor. Janet and Frank received $83,000 in stolen rugs, jewelry and furs. Janet testified that Bruce Sr. gave her two or three garden tractors; she said she kept two and gave the third to the juror as a bribe. Bruce Sr., David and Norman Johnston, and Roy Myers were acquitted of the theft charges.

When the police were gathering information about the burglary ring, Manheim resident Gary G. Hauck was asked to testify. Hauck had bought a piece of farm equipment but was not aware it was stolen by the Johnston gang in 1976. Police traced the equipment back to the ring and wanted Hauck to testify about whom he had purchased it from. Hauck, then a self-employed auto-body worker, told a reporter he had gotten a call at 2 a.m. the morning before the preliminary hearing. The caller urged him not to identify anyone at the hearing. To convince Hauck that he wasn't fooling, the caller said Hauck would find dynamite under the seat of his truck, but that it wasn't rigged to explode. Hauck investigated, found five sticks of dynamite, and did not identify anyone at the hearing. Later, during a trial of the brothers, Hauck said he had lied at that hearing because of the threat.

=== 1977 ===
April: The brothers transported $21,900 in stolen cigarettes across state lines. They all pleaded guilty to this crime in 1981.

May: The three brothers stole $28,000 from Longwood Gardens in Chester County. In 1981 they were serving 2- to 4-year sentences for convictions on state charges for this crime.

=== August 1978 victims ===
As the Johnston Gang came under increased police surveillance due to their high-profile activities, they began an assassination campaign to eliminate potential witnesses.

- James "Jimmy" Johnston (18) (son of Bruce Johnston Sr.) — murdered August 16, 1978
- Duane Lincoln (17) — murdered August 16, 1978
- Wayne Sampson (20) — murdered August 16, 1978
- James Sampson (24) — murdered August 21, 1978
- Robin Miller (15) (girlfriend of Bruce Johnston Jr.) — murdered August 30, 1978
- Bruce Johnston Jr. (19) — critically injured during an attempted murder — August 30, 1978

== Investigation, arrest, trial and appeal ==
=== 1979 ===
The Johnston brothers were found guilty of stealing farm tractors in Ephrata and selling them to an associate. They were sentenced to four to nine years in prison for the thefts. Bruce Sr. appealed this conviction. Police were already pursuing the brothers for murdering the young members of the operation to cover up other burglaries. Investigators connected the gang with $1 million in stolen goods, and believed the actual total was much higher.

=== 1981 ===
Bruce Johnston was convicted of the murders of Gary Crouch, James Johnston, James Sampson, Robin Miller, Wayne Sampson, and Duane Lincoln and for the attempted murder of Bruce Jr. He received six life sentences.

David Johnston and Norman Johnston were convicted of the murders of James Johnston, Robin Miller, Wayne Sampson, and Duane Lincoln. They each received four life sentences.

=== 1987 ===
The Johnston brothers returned to the courts seeking new trials. Their attorneys were claiming that in the former trial it wasn't revealed to the defense that key witness James Griffin, a former gang member, had testified under an immunity agreement with the U.S. attorney's office. The attorneys wanted to know whether or not he made a similar agreement with local and state authorities in exchange for freedom. On the witness stand Griffin testified that he was never prosecuted for committing about 150 burglaries while a member of the gang.

== Afterward ==
David Johnston is serving his sentence in Greene, Pennsylvania. Norman was in Huntingdon, Pennsylvania, but he was transferred to Camp Hill, Pennsylvania, after his 1999 escape. He is currently housed in Forest, Pennsylvania. Bruce was in Graterford, Pennsylvania, until his death in 2002.

When Norman Johnston escaped, Bruce Johnston Sr. and David Johnston were moved to solitary confinement. Bruce appealed his sentence many times to no avail.

Norman Johnston was featured on America's Most Wanted on August 15, 1999.

Three of the "Kiddy Gang" murder victims (Wayne Sampson, 20; Duane Lincoln, 17; and James Johnston, 18) had disappeared in August and were shot and buried near the infamous Devil's Road/Cult House Road [Cossart Road] along the Northern Delaware/Pennsylvania Border in Pennsbury Township, Pennsylvania. This road is also the location where some of the film The Village (2004 film) was filmed.

In 2002, Bruce Johnston Sr. died of complications from liver disease at the age of 63 in Graterford Prison, Graterford, Pennsylvania.

After testifying against his father, Bruce Johnston Jr. had additional brushes with the law. In 2013, he was arrested on drug delivery charges. "He had the opportunity for a new chance. It did not work out, though. That's sad," said Joseph Carroll, the former Chester County district attorney who dealt with Johnston Jr. in connection with his testimony against his father and other members of the gang. "I think some of us felt bad for the guy," added Carroll. "You grow up in that environment and what could your future be? My impression was that he was a victim of circumstance in where he grew up." Bruce Jr. currently is serving a sentence of 7 to 14 years.

Ancel Hamm died at the age of 81 on August 4, 2025, while serving his sentence at SCI Laurel Highlands.

== Books ==
Bruce Mowday, a Chester County reporter who covered the Johnstons' trials for the West Chester (Pa.) Daily Local News, wrote Jailing the Johnston Gang: Bringing Serial Murderers to Justice in 2009. It is published by Barricade Books.

== Quotes (Norman Johnston) ==
1999: "We asked him (after his recapture), 'Was it worth it?' and he said, 'Not for 20 days.'"
According to the state police, Norman Johnston was tired, saying, "You [troopers] wouldn't quit."

1999: "I was probed by aliens and that's why I did it."

== Film and television ==
The movie At Close Range was based on the murders in 1978. Christopher Walken plays Brad Whitewood Sr., the alias in the movie for Bruce Johnston Sr. Sean Penn plays his son, Brad Whitewood Jr. Terry, Brad Jr.'s girlfriend, is played by Mary Stuart Masterson.
