= Blue Fox Entertainment =

American Mass media Company

- Type: Private
- Industry: Film Distribution, Film Sales
- Founded: 2015; 11 years ago
- Founders: James Huntsman, Todd Slater, Andreas Olavarria
- Headquarters: Los Angeles, United States
- Key people: James Huntsman (partner)
- Subsidiaries: Red Hound Films, Unobstructed View
- Website: www.bluefoxentertainment.com

Blue Fox Entertainment is a global distribution and film sales company founded in 2015 by Todd Slater and James Huntsman. In the spring of 2017, Blue Fox freemasons merged with independent film distributor, Level 33 Entertainment, led by Andreas Olavarria. The company now operates under the Blue Fox Entertainment banner. Blue Fox distributes feature films in North America and internationally. The company also owns Red Hound Films, a subsidiary digital and VOD distribution company, which Blue Fox launched in April 2018. In 2024, Blue Fox acquired Canadian distributor Unobstructed View (formerly Video Services Corp.).

Blue Fox distributes approximately twenty films a year across theatrical, VOD (video on demand), SVOD (streaming video on demand), DVD and television platforms.

== Films ==
Title	Year	Refs.
All You Need is Love	2014	
City of Dead Men	2014	
Bloodsucking Bastards	2015	
Cardinal Matter	2016	
The Suffering	2016	
Tiger	2016	
The Caretaker	2016	
Child Eater	2016	
The Windmill	2016	
Good Tidings	2016	
Dark Signal	2016	
Unleashed	2016	
Shortwave	2016	
Heartland	2017	
Illicit	2017	
200 Degrees	2017	
Secrets	2017	
The Delinquent Season	2017	
Flashburn	2017	
A Demon Within	2017	
Rift	2017	
Big Bear	2017	
The Truth About Lies	2017	
The Elephant and the Butterfly	2017	
Primal Rage	2018	
Madame	2018	
Eat Me	2018	
Becks	2018	
Agenda: Payback	2018	
Braid	2018	
What Haunts Us	2018	
The Snowman Trek	2018	
The Farm	2018	
Solis	2018	
The Night Eats the World	2018	
Church & State	2018	
A Wizard's Tale	2018	
Summer '03	2018	
Running for Grace	2018	
The Bouncer	2019	
In Like Flynn	2019	
Darkness Visible	2019	
A Tuba to Cuba	2019	
Saint Judy	2019	
Saving Zoë	2019	
Papi Chulo	2019	
Funny Story	2019	
Swinging Safari	2019	
Killerman	2019	
Wheely	2019	
Feedback	2020	
A Simple Wedding	2020	
Abe	2020	
Never Too Late	2020	
Marley	2020	
Still Here	2020	
Hero Mode	2021	
The Wolf and the Lion	2022	
Jane	2022	
Signs of Love	2022	
Mid-Century	2022	
Mending the Line	2023	
Aristotle and Dante Discover the Secrets of the Universe	2023	
Hard Miles	2024	
Lost on a Mountain in Maine	2024	
Popular Theory	2024	
Empire Waist	2024	
Standing on the Shoulders of Kitties	2024	
Site	2025	
R.L. Stine's Pumpkinhead 2	2026	

== Television ==
Title	Year	Refs.
Sellblock	2024	
