= No Man's Land (1987 film) =

American crime drama film by Peter Werner

- Theatrical release poster
- Directed by: Peter Werner
- Written by: Dick Wolf
- Produced by: Joseph Stern; Dick Wolf
- Starring: Charlie Sheen; D. B. Sweeney; Randy Quaid
- Cinematography: Hiro Narita
- Edited by: Steven Cohen
- Music by: Basil Poledouris
- Distributed by: Orion Pictures
- Release date: October 23, 1987
- Running time: 106 minutes
- Country: United States
- Language: English
- Budget: $8 million
- Box office: $2.9 million

No Man's Land is a 1987 American crime drama film directed by Peter Werner, written by Dick Wolf, and starring Charlie Sheen, D. B. Sweeney, and Randy Quaid. The plot follows a rookie cop who goes undercover and infiltrates a car theft ring. The film was released on October 23, 1987 and received mixed reviews from critics.

== Plot ==
When an undercover detective is shot dead while investigating a string of Porsche 911 thefts, Lieutenant Vincent Bracey assigns 22-year-old San Diego officer Benjamin "Benjy" Taylor to infiltrate a Porsche garage suspected to be a front for the grand theft auto scheme. Benjy is chosen because of his extensive mechanical knowledge of German cars and his rookie status, which dissuades others from suspecting that he is a cop. Bracey wants Benjy to obtain evidence that millionaire playboy Ted Varrick is the mastermind behind the thefts and the murder of the detective.

Using the alias "Billy Ayles", Benjy moves to Los Angeles and gets a job at Technique Porsche as a mechanic. After Benjy fixes Ted's Porsche one night, the two men become close friends, and Benjy becomes romantically attached to Ted's sister Ann. Benjy also discovers the presence of a rival syndicate led by Frank Martin, which leads him to believe that Ted is not the prime suspect despite Bracey's insistence.

Eventually, Ted brings Benjy into his side business of stealing Porsches, with garage manager Malcolm coordinating the operations. Benjy's first few attempts at stealing cars fail miserably, with Frank's syndicate catching on and slashing his hand as a warning. While doing a job at the mall, Benjy and Ted are confronted by Frank and his thugs, but they manage to lose them in a lengthy car chase. Ted rewards Benjy with a red Porsche that night. The next day, Ted goes to Technique Porsche and finds Malcolm has been murdered. In retaliation, he kills Frank at a nightclub.

During a phone conversation at a party, corrupt police Lieutenant Curtis Loos - who was hired by Ted to take out the detective in the film's opening - tells Ted about Benjy's real identity. The next night, Ted has Benjy meet Loos at a warehouse for a payoff. When Loos tries to kill Benjy, Ted runs him over to save his friend in spite of what he knows. Later, Benjy stops at Bracey's house to inform him of what happened with Loos and accuses the Lieutenant of conspiring with him. Bracey kicks Benjy out but tells him to call in the morning so they can work things out. Benjy drives off, unaware that Ted is nearby, spying on him.

The next day, Benjy's cover is blown in front of Ann when his uncle Mike visits his apartment. He goes to Bracey's house, only to find that Ted has murdered him. Ted is preparing to flee the country when Benjy convinces him to meet up at the mall, where he tries to arrest Ted for the murders. Ted refuses to go quietly and a gunfight breaks out; Benjy is wounded but manages to shoot and kill Ted.

== Cast ==
- Charlie Sheen as Ted Varrick
- D. B. Sweeney as Deputy Sheriff Benjamin 'Benjy' Taylor / Bill Ayles
- Randy Quaid as Lieutenant Vincent Bracey
- Lara Harris as Ann Varrick
- Bill Duke as Malcolm
- R.D. Call as Frank Martin
- Arlen Dean Snyder as Lieutenant Curtis Loos
- M. Emmet Walsh as Captain Haun
- Al Shannon as Danny
- Bernard Pock as Ridley
- Kenny Endoso as Leon
- James F. Kelly as Brandon
- Lori Butler as Suzanne
- Clare Wren as Deborah
- George Dzundza as Uncle Mike (uncredited)
- Linda Carol as Party Girl
- Danitza Kingsley as Margot
- Peggy McCay as Benjy's Mom
- Linda Shayne as Peggy
- Robert Pierce as Jim
- Claude Earl Jones as Uncle Roy
- Jan Burrell as Aunt Rhea
- Channing Chase as Aunt Fran
- Jessica Puscas as Mary Jean
- Molly Carter as Colleen
- Guy Boyd as Jaws
- Henry G. Sanders as Heath
- Gary Riley as Cal
- Jenny Gago as Tory Bracey
- Scott Lincoln as Bailey
- Tom Santo as Juio
- Michael Riley as Horton
- Brad Pitt as Waiter (uncredited)
- John Gocha as Porsche Mechanic (uncredited)
- Denis Hartigan as Duncan
- Jeff Dandurand as Kid Auto Thief
- Scotty Gelt as Bartender (uncredited)

== Production ==
Avi Nesher was originally going to direct, but was replaced by Peter Werner just a few days before shooting began, Filming locations that were used included Rodeo Drive in Beverly Hills, the Sunset Strip in West Hollywood, and the waterfront and a warehouse in San Pedro. Extensive shooting was also done at the Westside Pavilion shopping mall in West Los Angeles and in the parking garage at Filmland Center in Culver City.

During the filming of the final scene, Charlie Sheen was knocked unconscious when a squib that hardened overnight detonated at the wrong time. He sustained lacerations to his face and a loss of hearing in one ear that lasted four weeks.

Brad Pitt made his second movie appearance as an extra, alongside other uncredited roles in 1987. During the restaurant scene, Pitt tried to ad-lib a line as he wanted to get a Screen Actors Guild (SAG) card, but the assistant director threatened to fire him if he tried again.

== Soundtrack ==
The original music score was composed by Basil Poledouris. Ska band The Untouchables performed live in the first party scene.

== Release ==
The film opened in theaters on October 23, 1987, on 510 screens nationwide.

== Reception ==
On Rotten Tomatoes the film holds an approval rating of 50% based on six reviews, with an average rating of 4.8/10. Metacritic assigned the film a weighted average score of 52 out of 100, based on 10 critics, indicating "mixed or average reviews". Audiences polled by CinemaScore gave the film an average grade of "B" on an A+ to F scale.

Roger Ebert gave the film three out of four stars, saying the movie "has lots of scenes of Sheen and Sweeney stealing cars, and it dwells on the details of their crimes, and the reckless way they risk capture. This is a movie about how money and excitement generate a seduction that can change personal values; it's better and deeper than you might expect."

== Home media ==
Orion Home Video released the film on VHS May 17, 1988. No Man's Land was released on DVD by MGM Home Video on February 4, 2003; its cover has the tagline "Fast, furious... and deadly". The film was released on Blu-ray by Kino International on July 27, 2017.

== See also ==
- Point Break, a 1991 film with a similar premise
- The Fast and the Furious, a 2001 film with a similar premise
