= Aftermath (2013 film) =

- Directed by: Thomas Farone
- Screenplay by: Thomas Farone
- Produced by: Sylvia Caminer; Thomas Chestaro; Anthony Michael Hall; David Kitay; Michalina Scorzelli
- Starring: Anthony Michael Hall; Chris Penn; Tony Danza; Frank Whaley
- Cinematography: Scott Beardslee; Thomas Farone
- Edited by: Thomas Farone
- Music by: David Kitay
- Production companies: Dolger Films; Ronin Films
- Distributed by: Freestyle Releasing
- Release date: 2013 (Cinequest)
- Running time: 84 minutes
- Country: United States
- Language: English

Aftermath is a 2013 American crime thriller film written and directed by Thomas Farone and starring Anthony Michael Hall, Chris Penn, Tony Danza and Frank Whaley.

== Cast ==
- Anthony Michael Hall as Thomas "Boss" Fiorini
- Chris Penn as Tony Bricker
- Tony Danza as King
- Elisabeth Röhm as Rebecca Fiorini
- Lily Rabe as Samantha
- Frank Whaley as Eric Bricker
- Leo Burmester as Sheriff

== Production ==
The film was shot in Saratoga Springs, New York. Filming began in either 2005 or 2006 and wrapped in either 2011 or 2012. The deaths of cast members Chris Penn and Leo Burmester, as well as budget and schedule issues, served as reasons as to why the production lasted for years.

== Release ==
The film was released at the Cinequest Film & Creativity Festival in 2013. It was released on VOD on April 21, 2015.

== Reception ==
Gary Goldstein of the Los Angeles Times gave the film a positive review and wrote, "The result is a bit of a patchwork, one that’s often clever, other times convoluted, but always watchable — if only to see what might happen next."

The Hollywood Reporter gave the film a negative review: "Aftermath offers little to justify its obviously long-delayed theatrical release."

Jeri Jacquin of Patch Media awarded the film "four tubs of popcorn out of five."
