= Bruce Mowday =

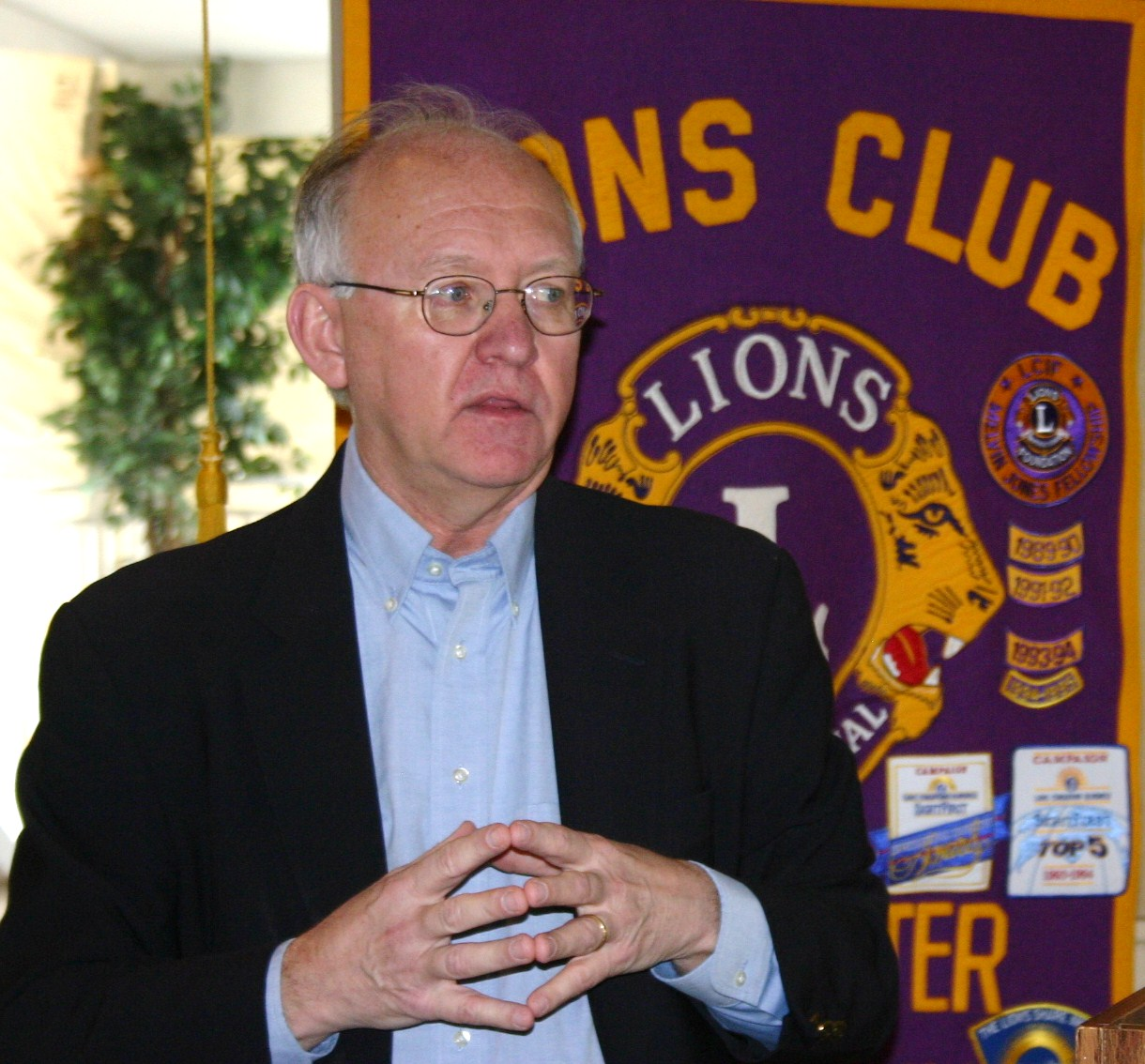
Bruce Mowday 2009

Bruce E. Mowday is an author who lives in Chester County, Pennsylvania. He specializes in books about local history, business, sports, and true crime. He is active with the Chester County History Center.

== Professional life ==
Mowday began working as a sportswriter for the Coatesville Record while still in high school. He continued his journalism career at the Daily Local News in West Chester, Pennsylvania, working as a courthouse reporter and rising to become managing editor. He also worked at the St. Louis Sun. While at the Daily Local, he covered the trials that form the basis of his book Jailing the Johnston Gang; the book was later cited by the Johnston brothers in an unsuccessful appeal for a new trial.

Mowday co-founded the Brandywine Valley Writers Group in 2004 with writers Therese Boyd and Carla Westerman. He has been a guest speaker on the subject of writing and publishing, for both that group and the Main Line Writers Group in King of Prussia, Pennsylvania.

== Personal life ==
Mowday lives in West Chester, Pennsylvania. He has two adult daughters and three grandsons.

== Books ==
Mowday has published several books:

- J. Howard Wert's Gettysburg (Schiffer Publishing)
- Selling Your Book (Barricade Books)
- Pickett's Charge: The Untold Story (Barricade Books)
- Life With Flavor: A Personal History of Herr's (Barricade Books)
- Richie Ashburn: Why The Hall Not? and the Amazing Journey to Cooperstown (Barricade Books)
- Jailing the Johnston Gang: Bringing Serial Murderers to Justice (Barricade Books);
- "A Killer at the Door: The Dramatic Prison Break and Manhunt for Convicted Murderer Danilo Cavalcante" (Schiffer Publishing)
- "Lafayette at Brandywine: The Making of an American Hero" (Barricade Publishing)
- "Lafayette: America's Young Hero & Guest" (Squire Cheyney Books)
- "Emotional Gettysburg" (Regent Publishing)
- "Emotional Brandywine" (Regent Publishing)
- Unlikely Allies: Fort Delaware's Prison Community in the Civil War (Stackpole Books)
- September 11, 1777: Washington's Defeat at Brandywine Dooms Philadelphia (White Mane Publishers)
- Selling of an Author (White Mane Publishers)
- West Chester: Six Walking Tours (Schiffer Publishing)
- "Spanning the Centuries" (a history of Caln Township, Chester County, written with his daughter Melissa Mowday)
- “Small Town Cops in the Crosshairs - The 1972 Sniper Slayings of Policemen William Davis & Richard Posey”, (Schiffer Publishing, 2022)

He has also compiled six books of historical postcards and photographs, published by Arcadia Publishing:

- Along the Brandywine River
- Chester County Mushroom Farming
- West Chester
- Downingtown
- Coatesville
- Parkesburg
