= Murder by Numbers =

2002 film by Barbet Schroeder

- Theatrical release poster
- Directed by: Barbet Schroeder
- Written by: Tony Gayton
- Produced by: Richard Crystal; Barbet Schroeder; Susan Hoffman
- Starring: Sandra Bullock; Ryan Gosling; Michael Pitt; Agnes Bruckner; Chris Penn; R. D. Call; Ben Chaplin
- Cinematography: Luciano Tovoli
- Edited by: Lee Percy
- Music by: Clint Mansell
- Production companies: Castle Rock Entertainment; Schroeder/Hoffman Productions
- Distributed by: Warner Bros. Pictures
- Release date: April 19, 2002
- Running time: 120 minutes
- Country: United States
- Language: English
- Budget: $50 million
- Box office: $56.7 million

Murder by Numbers is a 2002 American psychological thriller film produced and directed by Barbet Schroeder and starring Sandra Bullock in the main role alongside Ben Chaplin, Ryan Gosling, and Michael Pitt. It is loosely based on the Leopold and Loeb case.

The film was screened at the 2002 Cannes Film Festival, but was not entered in competition.

== Plot ==
Richard Haywood and Justin Pendleton are high school classmates; Richard is a cocky, wealthy and popular extrovert, while Justin is a gifted but introverted loner. Outwardly they are enemies, but secretly they are actually very close friends. After months of planning a "perfect crime," the duo abduct a woman at random, strangle her, and plant evidence implicating Richard's marijuana dealer, school janitor Ray Feathers.

Detective Cassie Mayweather and her new partner Sam Kennedy investigate the murder. She has sex with him early on as she had with previous partners, but will not let him see her chest, and curtly sends him home afterwards.

Footprints at the crime scene lead to Richard, and vomit nearby implicates Justin. Both have alibis, and deny knowing each other, but Cassie is convinced that Richard is the murderer and Justin is involved. Sam criticizes her refusal to consider other suspects, as most of the physical evidence points away from the two boys.

Cassie's boss, Captain Rod Cody, and her ex, Assistant D.A. Al Swanson, fearing Richard's influential parents, take Cassie off as lead for the case. Richard kills Ray, making it appear like a suicide. Sam, following the planted evidence, tracks down Ray. When he finds him dead, the woman's murder appears solved; but Sam is finally convinced by Cassie that she may be right, so continues the investigation.

Justin, who has a crush on classmate Lisa Mills, works up the courage to ask her out. A jealous Richard seduces Lisa, videoing them, then gives Justin a copy. Justin is enraged, but regains control, knowing the police are still watching them.

Cassie begins receiving calls from her ex-husband Carl Hudson, who went to prison for stabbing her in the chest 17 times. His parole hearing is coming up, and he wants her to speak on his behalf. Cassie confides to Sam that although she became a cop to prove to herself that she was not a victim, she is terrified of seeing Carl again. She also confesses that Richard reminds her of Carl, which is why she is convinced of Richard's guilt, and obsessed with proving it.

Sam and Cassie bring Richard and Justin in for separate interrogations, trying to induce them into implicating each other, but neither of them talks before they are both released. At the victim's home, Cassie determines how the boys carried out the abduction and altered the physical evidence.

Richard, knowing that Cassie is closing in on them, and having commenced a plea bargain with the DA, flees to an abandoned house. He convinces Justin to join him there, then produces two revolvers, proposing a mutual suicide. With their eyes closed, on the count of three, Justin shoots into the air, but Richard does not.

Justin demands to see Richard's gun, which is not loaded. As a furious Justin is about to shoot Richard, Cassie arrives. Richard grabs Justin's gun and shoots at Cassie, wounding Justin who tries to protect her instead. She goes after Richard, but he starts to strangle her on a rickety deck jutting out over a cliff. Cassie manages to gain the upper hand, knocking Richard off the balcony, where he falls to his death. Justin grabs Cassie, who is hanging off the edge of the deck, pulling her back into the house.

Cassie assures Justin that she will intercede on his behalf to get him tried as a juvenile, since he was an innocent dupe, manipulated by the ruthless Richard. Then she notices a mark on her neck caused by Richard's large ring, and realizes that the dead woman's neck did not have a similar mark. Confronted with the evidence, Justin confesses that he strangled the victim, proving his "courage" to Richard, and is arrested.

Cassie faces her fears and enters the courtroom to testify at Carl's parole hearing. The bailiff calls her to the stand by her legal name: Jessica Marie Hudson.

== Cast ==
- Sandra Bullock as Det. Cassie Mayweather/Jessica Marie Hudson
- Ben Chaplin as Det. Sam Kennedy
- Ryan Gosling as Richard Haywood
- Michael Pitt as Justin Pendleton
- Agnes Bruckner as Lisa Mills
- Chris Penn as Ray Feathers
- R. D. Call as Capt. Rod Cody
- Tom Verica as A.D.A. Al Swanson

== Production ==
In July 2000, it was reported that Tony Gayton had written a thriller script titled Murder by Numbers for Castle Rock Entertainment centered on two gifted high school students who plan and execute a series of “perfect” murders, while evading a rookie FBI profiler. In October of that year, it was reported that Barbet Schroeder was in final negotiations to direct film with Sandra Bullock expected to star after the latter had such a positive experience on Castle Rock's Miss Congeniality that she was eager to reteam with the company on another project.

== Reception ==
=== Box office ===
The film was released April 19, 2002 in the United States and Canada and grossed $9.3 million in 2,663 theaters its opening weekend, ranking third at the box office behind fellow opener The Scorpion King ($36.1 million) and Changing Lanes ($11.1 million). The film grossed a total of $56,714,147 worldwide — $31,945,749 in the United States and Canada and $24,768,398 in other territories.

=== Critical reception ===
Reviews for the film were mixed-to-negative. The review aggregator website Rotten Tomatoes reported that 30% of critics have given the film a positive review based on 128 reviews, with an average rating of 5.30/10. The site's critics consensus reads, "A predictable police procedural that works better as a character study rather than a thriller." On Metacritic, the film has a weighted average score of 50 out of 100 based on 35 critics, indicating "mixed or average reviews". Audiences polled by CinemaScore gave the film an average grade of "C+" on an A+ to F scale.

Roger Ebert awarded three stars out of a possible four, stating: "Bullock does a good job here of working against her natural likability, creating a character you'd like to like, and could like, if she weren't so sad, strange and turned in upon herself. She throws herself into police work not so much because she's dedicated as because she needs the distraction, needs to keep busy and be good to assure herself of her worth. As she draws the net closer, and runs into more danger and more official opposition, the movie more or less helplessly starts thinking to itself about that cliff above the sea, but at least the climax shows us that Bullock can stay in character no matter what."

A. O. Scott, writing for The New York Times, said that "much of this new Barbet Schroeder film -- a star vehicle for Sandra Bullock, who is also an executive producer -- follows well-worn paths of the cops-and-psycho-killer routine." He describes Haywood and Pendleton as "a pair of teenage Nietzsche-heads who might be appearing in a remake of Alfred Hitchcock's Rope for The WB network." Scott adds,

The real surprise, given the secondhand material, is that not everything proceeds by rote in Murder by Numbers, which opens today [19 April 2002] nationwide. The rickety structure of the movie's main plot sustains some clammy and fascinating psychological inquiry, and one suspects that, as in Single White Female, Mr. Schroeder's interest is less in the story than in the possibilities it affords for exercising his perverse, chilly curiosity about power, intimacy and the varieties of human distress. This movie is most interesting as a study of two parallel relationships, neither one primarily sexual (though sexuality is the subtext of one and the half-accidental consequence of the other), but both saturated with enough longing, envy, tenderness and loathing to make actual sex a bit redundant."

Scott also remarks briefly on "the scene in which [Cassie] is attacked by an angry baboon. The baboon, at least, is unexpected, though also inexplicable."
