= Dylan Penn =

American model and actress

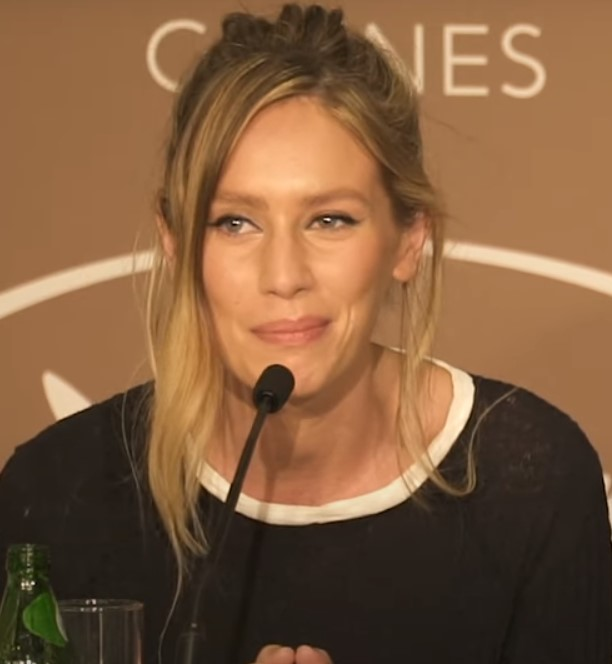
- Penn in 2021
- Born: Dylan Frances Penn; April 13, 1991 (age 35); Los Angeles, California, U.S.
- Occupations: Model, actress
- Years active: 2013–present
- Parents: Sean Penn (father); Robin Wright (mother)
- Relatives: Hopper Penn (brother); Michael Penn (uncle); Chris Penn (uncle); Leo Penn (grandfather); Eileen Ryan (grandmother); Charlie Wright (cousin)
- Modeling information
- Height: 5 ft 7 in (1.70 m)
- Hair color: Blonde
- Eye color: Blue
- Agency: One Management (New York) d'management group (Milan); Premier Model Management (London); DT Model Management (Los Angeles)

Dylan Frances Penn (born April 13, 1991) is an American model and actress. She is the daughter of Sean Penn and Robin Wright. Her early public roles included modeling campaigns for Gap, a magazine cover for treats!, a music video appearance in Nick Jonas's "Chains" and an acting role in Elvis & Nixon.

== Early life ==
Dylan Frances Penn was born on April 13, 1991, in Los Angeles, California to actor-director Sean Penn and actress Robin Wright. Wright had surrendered the role of Maid Marian in Robin Hood: Prince of Thieves due to her pregnancy with Dylan. Penn was raised in Ross, a town in Marin County, California. She has a younger brother named Hopper Jack. Her paternal grandfather Leo Penn is of Russian-Jewish and Lithuanian-Jewish descent, whereas her paternal grandmother Eileen Ryan is Catholic and of Irish and Italian descent.

She attended Marin Academy, and dropped out of the University of Southern California after one semester. She spent time living in New York City. Her parents' divorce was finalized in 2010. Before modeling, Penn had worked delivering pizzas, as a waitress, and as a freelance screenplay editor. She also worked in New York City as a restaurant hostess and an intern at an advertising agency.

== Career ==
=== Modeling ===
Penn's first modeling billboards were for Gap in 2013. Then she appeared in GQ in December 2013, in W in January 2014, and Elle in March 2014.

Penn posed for photographer Tony Duran for a partially nude cover and an interior layout in the seventh, 2014 Spring/Summer, issue of the erotica and fine arts magazine treats!, released in April 2014. Penn said, "I have always loved his black and white nudes, they were always so tastefully done and, more specifically, showed that certain elegant yet strong beauty that I think all women embody". Within weeks of the issue's release, Penn signed a new modeling contract with Premier Model Management to represent her in the United Kingdom.

Penn appeared at No. 68 on the Maxim annual Hot 100 list in 2014, and at No. 93 in the AskMen.com 99 Most Desirable Women list that same year. In June 2014, she filmed a role in the music video for the Nick Jonas song "Chains" at the Hotel Alexandria. Three months later, Penn and Poppy Delevingne played biker women in Rock Roll Ride, a short film for shoe designer Stuart Weitzman, directed by Julia Restoin Roitfeld, for Paris Fashion Week. She appeared on the cover of L'Officiel that December and the cover of Asos in August 2015. The following January, Penn and her younger brother, Hopper, did their first joint fashion modeling campaign together, eventually making media appearances at Milan Fashion Week.

=== Acting ===
Penn's first film was the horror movie Condemned, directed by Eli Morgan Gesner, in which she played the girlfriend of a band member living in a rundown building. The film opened on Friday the 13th in November 2015. Another early role was in Elvis & Nixon, which stars Kevin Spacey. The movie was presented in at least one spring film festival and was released in April 2016. In November 2015, it was announced that she had booked roles in a pair of independent films: GenRX and Unfiltered. In 2021, she co-starred with her father in the film Flag Day, which he also directed.
