= Rosanna Arquette =

American actress (born 1959)

- Arquette
- Born: Rosanna Lisa Arquette; August 10, 1959 (age 67); New York City, U.S.
- Occupation: Actress
- Years active: 1977–present
- Spouses: Anthony Greco (m. 1979; div. 1980) James Newton Howard (m. 1986; div. 1987) John Sidel (m. 1993; div. 1999) Todd Morgan (m. 2013; sep. 2022)
- Partner: Steve Porcaro (1980–1983)
- Children: Zoë Bleu
- Father: Lewis Arquette
- Relatives: Patricia Arquette (sister); Alexis Arquette (sister); David Arquette (brother); Cliff Arquette (grandfather)
- Website: rosannaarquette.com

Rosanna Lisa Arquette (/roʊˈzɑːnə ɑːrˈkɛt/ roh-ZAH-nə ar-KET; born August 10, 1959) is an American actress. She was nominated for an Emmy Award for her performance in the television film The Executioner's Song (1982) and won the BAFTA Award for Best Actress in a Supporting Role for the film Desperately Seeking Susan (1985). Her other notable film credits include Baby It's You (1983), After Hours (1985), The Big Blue (1988), Nowhere to Run (1993), Pulp Fiction (1994), Crash (1996), The Whole Nine Yards (2000), and Joe Dirt (2001). She also directed the documentary Searching for Debra Winger (2002).

== Early life ==
Arquette was born in New York City, on August 10, 1959, the daughter of Brenda Olivia "Mardi" Nowak, an actress, poet, theater operator, activist, acting teacher, and therapist, and Lewis Arquette, a film actor and producer. Her paternal grandfather was comedian Cliff Arquette. Her mother was Jewish. Her father, whose original family surname was "Arcouet", was of part French-Canadian descent. Her father was a convert from Catholicism to Islam. Her four siblings, Richmond, Patricia, Alexis, and David, also became actors.

== Career ==
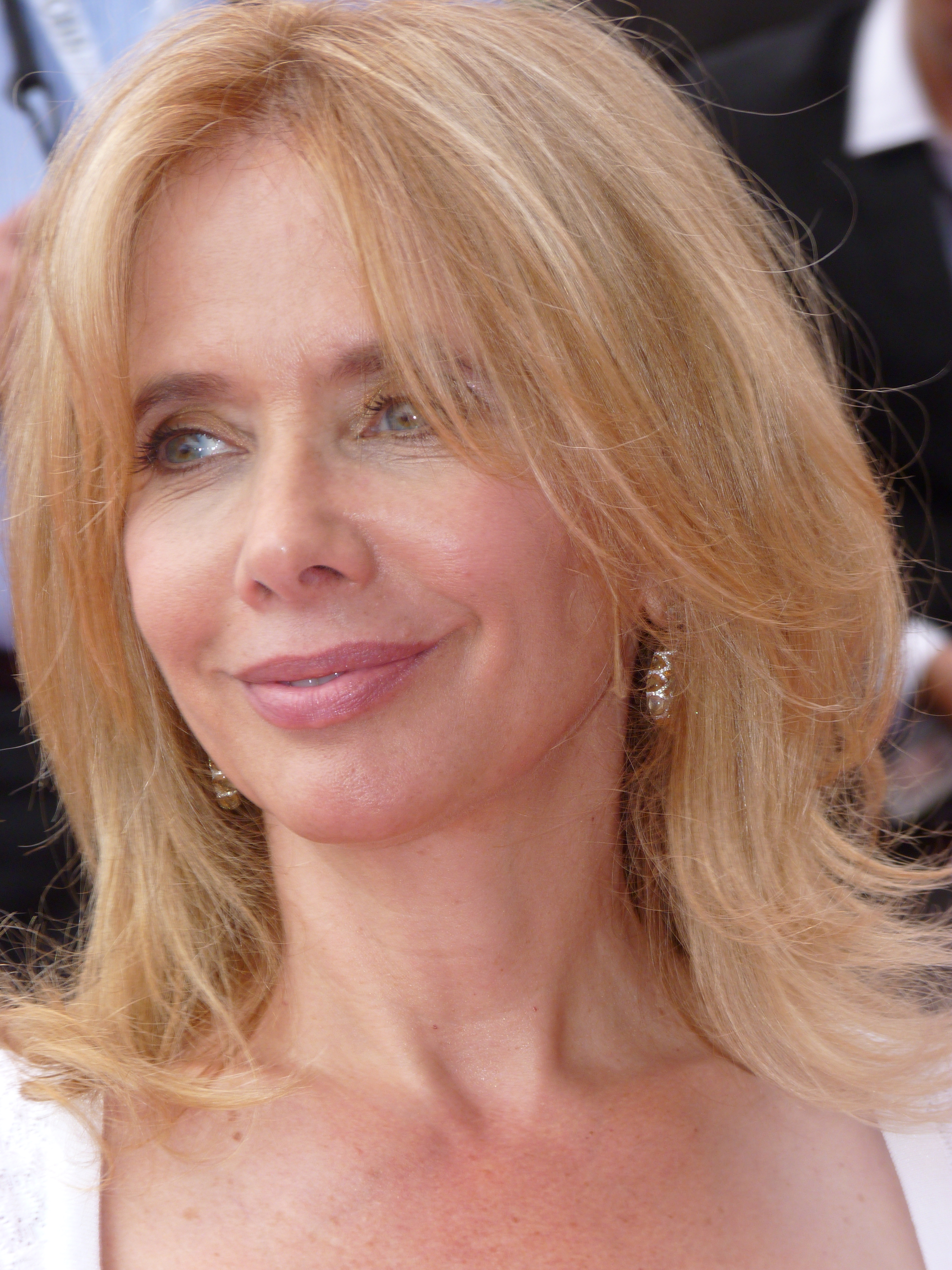
Arquette at the 2012 Monte-Carlo Television Festival

Arquette has appeared in both television and feature films since 1977. One of her first noticeable roles was in S.O.B. (1981), directed by Blake Edwards. She earned an Emmy Award nomination for the TV film The Executioner's Song (1982). However, she was unhappy with the film's nude scene, remarking in an interview that the idea of the general public seeing her naked made her feel uncomfortable and exploited, and that most of the offers she had received since demanded that she similarly expose herself. Her first starring role was in John Sayles's film, Baby It's You (1983), highly regarded by Rotten Tomatoes reviewers but not widely distributed. She co-starred in Desperately Seeking Susan (1985) alongside pop superstar Madonna, for which Arquette won a BAFTA Award for Best Actress in a Supporting Role despite appearing in the leading role. In an interview at the time, Arquette said "The two questions I hate the most are 'What was it like working with Madonna?' and 'Are you the Rosanna in the song "Rosanna"?'" Following the commercial and critical success of Lawrence Kasdan's Silverado (also 1985), the limited success of the Martin Scorsese film After Hours (also 1985) and the commercial flop 8 Million Ways to Die (1986), also a critical failure, she quit Hollywood to work in Europe, acting in Luc Besson's The Big Blue (1988). Director Scorsese then offered her a part in his segment of New York Stories (1989).

Arquette's other movies of note are Pulp Fiction and the David Cronenberg film Crash and the Australian film Wendy Cracked a Walnut (1990, also known as ...Almost). In 1990, she appeared on the cover and in a nude pictorial in Playboy's September issue, although she said it was without her prior knowledge or consent. Arquette starred in Sondra Locke's Trading Favors, played Angelina Jolie's mother in Hell's Kitchen and later appeared as the girlfriend of Jolie's real-life father Jon Voight on Ray Donovan.

In 2017, Arquette alleged (along with almost a hundred other women from the entertainment industry) that the film producer Harvey Weinstein sexually harassed her, threatened her because of her refusal to enter his hotel room, and subsequently saw to it that she was paid less for Pulp Fiction, then no longer cast her in A-list lead roles because of her rejection of his quid pro quo sexual harassment proposition; Weinstein was convicted of sex offences in 2020. When news broke about Weinstein's sexual offending in October 2017, Arquette was one of the first actresses to speak openly about his misconduct, with Ronan Farrow for The New Yorker and The New York Times's Jodi Kantor. In the documentary Untouchable (2019) about Weinstein, focusing on those who accused him of sexual abuse, Arquette, Paz de la Huerta, and Erika Rosenbaum were among those interviewed.

Arquette has expanded into directing, including the documentaries Searching for Debra Winger (2002) and All We Are Saying (2005); she also produced both projects. Arquette appeared in What About Brian as Nicole Varsi and in Showtime's The L Word as Cherie Jaffe. She also guest-starred in Malcolm in the Middle as a healer named Anita.

In 2009, she joined Fit Parent Magazine, founded by Craig Knight, as Editor at Large. Arquette starred in the 2011 French thriller The Divide, directed by Xavier Gens. She had a featured role in the 2012 comedy Peace, Love & Misunderstanding with Jane Fonda.

== Personal life ==
The Toto song "Rosanna" was written by David Paich, who has claimed that the song is based on numerous girls he had known. However, as a joke, the band members initially played along with the common assumption that the song was based on Arquette, who was dating Toto keyboard player Steve Porcaro at the time. Arquette herself played along with the joke, commenting in an interview that the song was about "my showing up at 4 a.m., bringing them juice and beer at their sessions."

Arquette was romantically involved with Peter Gabriel for several years, after his 1987 divorce from Jill Moore. Arquette has said on some occasions that his 1986 song "In Your Eyes" was inspired by her, although Gabriel has never confirmed that to be true and has explained that he drew inspiration for the song from other sources.

Arquette's first three marriages ended in divorce: to director Tony Greco, film composer James Newton Howard, and restaurateur John Sidel. She has one daughter with Sidel, Zoë Bleu, born in 1994, who is also an actress. In August 2013, Arquette married her fourth husband, investment banker Todd Morgan, following a two-year engagement. In January 2022, Todd Morgan filed for divorce from Arquette after 8 years of marriage.

Arquette has described her diet as "vegetarian for the most part".

In August 2019, Arquette posted a Twitter rant about her experience with white guilt, stating; "I'm sorry I was born white and privileged. It disgusts me. And I feel so much shame." She later claimed the FBI told her to set her Twitter page to private due to the reaction she received after posting that.

On March 8, 2026, Arquette expressed to The Sunday Times her hatred for the n-word and revealed she "cannot stand that [Tarantino] has been given a hall pass," in reference to the director's 1994 Pulp Fiction in which she had a "small role." She denounced the word's use, saying that this is "not art, it's just racist and creepy." In response, Quentin Tarantino stated that he "hoped" the publicity Arquette ostensibly sought by her criticism was worth "disrespecting" him and the film in which, he added, she had been "thrilled" to participate. He added that he found her action showed "lack of class."

== Philanthropy ==
In 2010, Arquette became Goodwill Ambassador for The Womanity Foundation.

== Filmography ==
=== Film ===
Year	Title	Role	Notes
1979	More American Graffiti	Girl in Commune	
1980	Gorp	Judy	
1981	S.O.B.	Babs	
1983	Baby It's You	Jill Rosen	
1983	Off the Wall	Pam Smith	
1985	The Aviator	Tillie Hansen	
1985	Desperately Seeking Susan	Roberta Glass / 'Susan'	
1985	Silverado	Hannah	
1985	After Hours	Marcy Franklin	
1986	8 Million Ways to Die	Sarah	
1986	Nobody's Fool	Cassie	
1987	Amazon Women on the Moon	Karen	Segment: "Two I.D.'s"
1988	The Big Blue	Johana Baker	
1989	New York Stories	Paulette	Segment: "Life Lessons"
1989	Black Rainbow	Martha Travis	
1990	Wendy Cracked a Walnut	Wendy	
1991	Flight of the Intruder	Callie Joy	
1991	The Linguini Incident	Lucy	
1992	Fathers & Sons	Miss Athena	
1993	Nowhere to Run	Clydie Anderson	
1993	The Wrong Man	Missy Mills	
1994	Pulp Fiction	Jody	
1994	La Cité de la peur	Rosanna Arquette	
1995	Search and Destroy	Lauren Mirkheim	
1996	Crash	Gabrielle	
1996	Valley Girls	Shelly von Schetekel	Short film
1996	White Lies	Junkie Artist	
1997	Trading Favors	Alex Langley	
1997	Gone Fishin'	Rita	
1997	Deceiver	Mrs. Kennesaw	
1998	Buffalo '66	Wendy Balsam	
1998	Hope Floats	Connie Phillips	Uncredited
1998	Hell's Kitchen	Liz McNeary	
1998	I'm Losing You	Rachel Krohn	
1998	Fait Accompli	Jezzebelle	
1999	Sugar Town	Eva	
1999	Palmer's Pick-up	Dawn	
1999	Pigeonholed	Devon's Mother	
2000	The Whole Nine Yards	Sophie Oseransky	
2000	Too Much Flesh	Amy	
2001	Things Behind the Sun	Pete	
2001	Joe Dirt	Charlene the Gator Farmer	Uncredited
2001	Big Bad Love	Velma	
2001	Good Advice	Cathy Sherman	
2001	Diary of a Sex Addict	Grace Horn	
2002	Searching for Debra Winger	Herself	Documentary; Also directorial debut
2004	Dead Cool	Deirdre	
2004	Gilded Stones	Sally	Short film
2005	My Suicidal Sweetheart	Vera	
2005	Welcome to California	Prostitute	
2005	IOWA	Effie Harte	
2005	Kids in America	Abby Pratt	
2006	I-See-You.Com	Lydia Ann Layton	
2007	Battle for Terra	Professor Lina (voice)	
2008	Ball Don't Lie	Francine	
2008	Growing Op	Diana	
2008	Nick Nolte: No Exit	Herself	Documentary
2009	Repo Chick	Lola	
2009	American Pie Presents: The Book of Love	Madeline Shearson	
2010	Inhale	Dr. Rubin	
2011	Convincing Clooney	JC	
2011	The Divide	Marilyn	
2011	Exodus Fall	Marilyn Minor	
2011	Peace, Love & Misunderstanding	Darcy	
2012	Hardflip	Bethany Jones	
2013	No Love Song	Paula	Short film
2014	Draft Day	Angie	
2014	Asthma	Gus' Mother	
2015	Larry Gaye: Renegade Male Flight Attendant	TV Anchorwoman	
2015	Kill Your Friends	Barbara	
2015	My Last Film	Actress	Short film
2016	Frank & Lola	Patricia	
2016	Lovesong	Eleanor	
2017	Maya Dardel	Leonora	
2017	Born Guilty	Judith	
2017	Holy Lands	Monica	
2017	SPF-18	Faye Cooper	
2017	On the Run	Aunt Roxy	Short film
2018	Billionaire Boys Club	Sydney's Mom	
2018	The Etruscan Smile	Claudia	
2018	Octavio Is Dead!	Joan	
2018	For the Love of George	Dr. Faye Carter	
2019	Untouchable	Herself	Documentary
2020	You Cannot Kill David Arquette	Herself	Documentary
2020	Love Is Love Is Love	Anne	
2020	Puppy Love	Deb	
2022	Signs of Love	Rosie	
2023	Ex-Husbands	Maria Pearce	
2024	Lineage	Mother	Short film
2024	Succubus	Denise	
2024	Future Day	Dr. Felicia Walter	
2024	Here's Yianni!	Amelia	
2026	The Moment	Tammy	
2026	Corporate Retreat	Deborah O'Hara	

=== Television ===
Year	Title	Role	Notes
1977	Fernwood 2 Night	Precision Swim Teamember	Episode: "Animal Sexuality"
1977	Having Babies II	Connie	Television film
1978	The Dark Secret of Harvest Home	Kate Constantine	2 episodes
1978	What Really Happened to the Class of '65?	Nancy	Episode: "Mr. Potential"
1978	Zuma Beach	Beverly	Television film
1978	James at 16	Karen Waller	Episode: "An Hour Before Midnight"
1978	ABC Afterschool Special	Charlie Meredith	Episode: "Mom and Dad Can't Hear Me"
1979	Eight Is Enough	Lori West	Episode: "Best of Friends"
1979–1980	Shirley	Debra Miller	13 episodes
1981	Here's Boomer	Ginny	Episode: "Good Looking"
1981	A Long Way Home	Rose Cavanaugh	Television film
1982	The Wall	Halinka Apt	Television film
1982	The Executioner's Song	Nicole Baker	Television film
1982	Johnny Belinda	Belinda McAdam	Television film
1983	Insight	Jo	Episode: "Butterfly"
1984	The Parade	Tilda Kirby	Television film
1986	Saturday Night Live	Herself (host)	Episode: "Rosanna Arquette/Ric Ocasek"
1987	Trying Times	Kara Dimley	Episode "A Family Tree"
1988	Promised a Miracle	Lucky Parker	Television film
1990	Separation	Sarah Weiss	Television film
1990	Sweet Revenge	Kate Williams	Television film
1991	Son of the Morning Star	Libby Custer	Television film
1992	In the Deep Woods	Joanna Warren	Television film
1994	Nowhere to Hide	Sarah Blake	Television film
1996	Homicide: Life on the Street	Caroline Widmer	Episode: "The Heart of a Saturday Night"
1997	Gun	Lilly Difideli	Episode: "Columbus Day"
1998	I Know What You Did	Stacey Keane	Television film. Produced in 1996 but was released 2 years later Rights currently owned by BVS Entertainment
1998	Floating Away	Maurey Talbot	Television film
1999	Switched at Birth	Linda Wells	Television film
2000	Poison	Dana Lazlo	Television film
2001	The Huntress	Arlene Potts	Episode: "Black Widow"
2002	Going to California	Helen	Episode: "Home Games"
2003	The Practice	Brenda Miller	Episode: "Character Evidence"
2003	Will & Grace	Julie	2 episodes
2004	Summerland	Ronnie	Episode: "Skipping School"
2004, 2006–2007	The L Word	Cherie Jaffe	5 episodes
2005	Law & Order: Criminal Intent	Kay Connelly	Episode: "Sex Club"
2005	Malcolm in the Middle	Anita	Episode: "Burning Man"
2005	Grey's Anatomy	Constance Ferguson	Episode: "Owner of a Lonely Heart"
2006–2007	What About Brian	Nicole Varzi	24 episodes
2008	Dirt	Mia	Episode: "And the Winner Is"
2008	Medium	Michelle Todd	Episode: "Lady Killer"
2008	Lipstick Jungle	Tina Atwood	Episode: "Let the Games Begin"
2009	Northern Lights	Charlene Galligan	Television film
2009	Eastwick	Greta Noa	2 episodes
2010	Private Practice	Corinne	2 episodes
2012	Royal Pains	Louise 'Lou' Hunter	2 episodes
2013	Girls	Petula	Episode: "Video Games"
2013–2014	Ray Donovan	Linda	6 episodes
2014	Law & Order: Special Victims Unit	Alexa Pierson	Episode: "Wednesday's Child"
2015	CSI: Cyber	Trish McCarthy	Episode: "Selfie 2.0"
2016	Roadies	Abby Van Ness	Episode: "Carpet Season"
2018	Sideswiped	Mary Maple	8 episodes
2020	Ratched	Anna	2 episodes
2021	The L Word: Generation Q	Cherie Jaffe	Episode: "Lobsters, Too"
2022–2023	Big Sky	Virginia Cessna	2 episodes
2023	Paul T. Goldman	Genevieve	Episode: "The Warrior"
2023	Florida Man	Rose	Episode: "Please Don't Wake Up"
2023	Hell's Kitchen	Herself (guest)	Episode: "A Hellish Food Fight"
2024	Presumed Innocent	Kate	Episode: "Discovery"

=== Web ===
Year	Title	Role	Notes
2010	Sweety	Mrs. Summers	2 episodes

== Awards and nominations ==
Year	Award	Category	Production	Result	Ref
1983	Primetime Emmy Awards	Outstanding Lead Actress in a Limited Series or a Special	The Executioner's Song	Nominated	
1984	Boston Society of Film Critics Awards	Best Actress	Baby It's You	Won	
1986	BAFTA Awards	Best Actress in a Supporting Role	Desperately Seeking Susan	Won	
1986	Golden Globe Awards	Best Performance by an Actress in a Motion Picture – Comedy or Musical	Desperately Seeking Susan	Nominated	
1986	Independent Spirit Awards	Best Female Lead	After Hours	Nominated	
1987	BAFTA Awards	Best Actress in a Supporting Role	After Hours	Nominated	
1989	Sitges - Catalan International Film Festival	Best Actress	Black Rainbow	Won	
1990	Australian Film Institute	Best Actress in a Lead Role	Wendy Cracked a Walnut	Nominated	
1990	Fantasporto	International Fantasy Film Award	Black Rainbow	Won	
1991	Mystfest	Best Actress	Black Rainbow	Won	
1994	Awards Circuit Community Awards	Best Cast Ensemble	Pulp Fiction	Won	
1997	Online Film & Television Association	Best Guest Actress in a Drama Series	Gun	Nominated	
2000	Teen Choice Awards	Film – Choice Hissy Fit	The Whole Nine Yards	Nominated	
2000	The Stinkers Bad Movie Awards	Worst Supporting Actress	The Whole Nine Yards	Nominated	
2007	Fantasporto	Special Career Award	—N/a	Won	
2007	LA Femme International Film Festival	Pioneer Award	—N/a	Nominated	
2021	Newport Beach Film Festival	Icon Award	Self	Won	
2022	Vienna Independent Film Festival	Best Supporting Actress	Futra Days	Won	
