= Leo Penn =

American director (1921–1998)

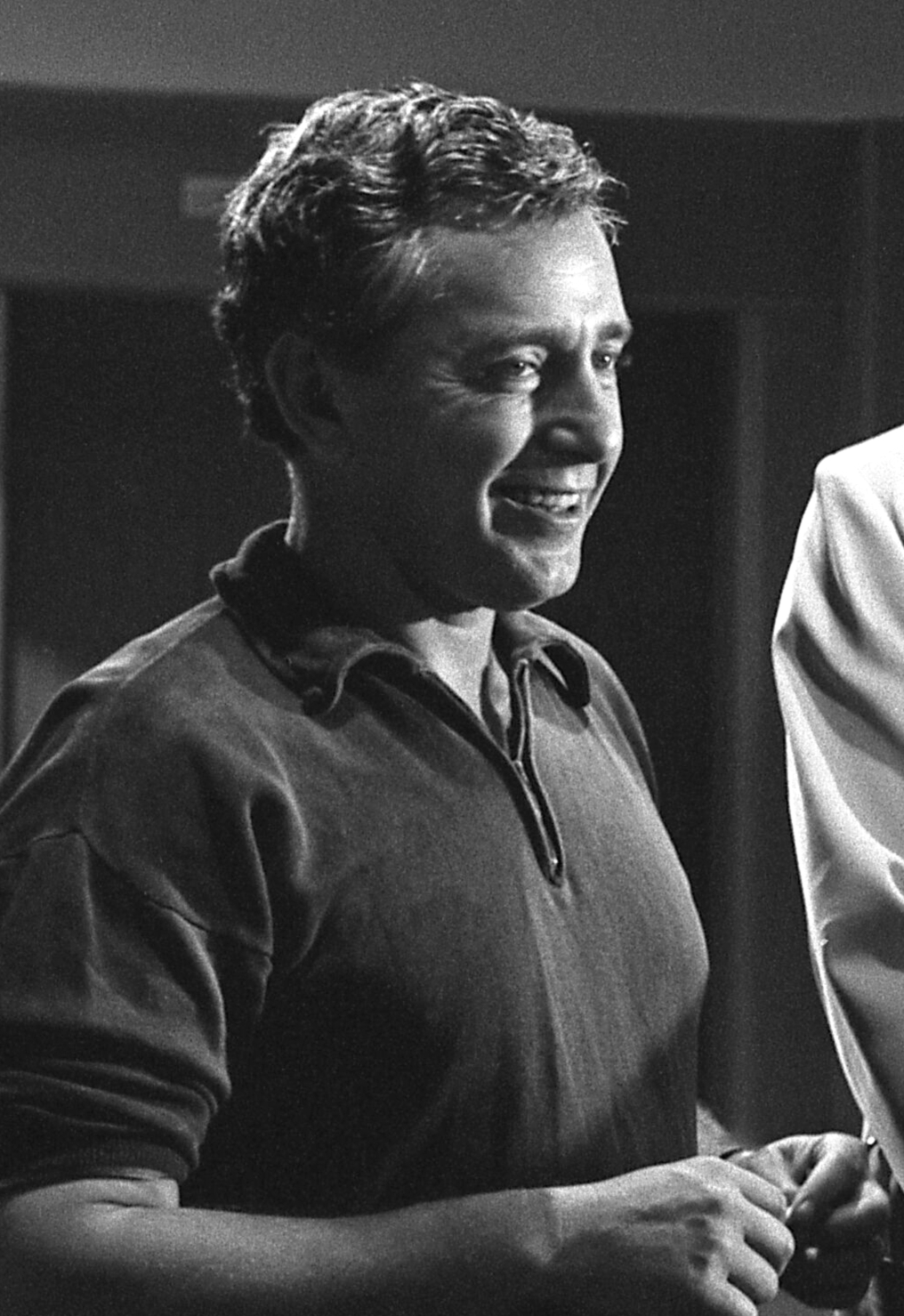
- Penn in 1964
- Born: Leo Zalman Penn; August 27, 1921; Lawrence, Massachusetts, U.S.
- Died: September 5, 1998 (aged 77); Santa Monica, California, U.S.
- Occupations: Television director; actor
- Years active: 1946–1995
- Spouses: Olive Deering (m. 1947; div. 1952) Eileen Ryan (m. 1957)
- Children: Michael; Sean; Chris
- Relatives: Dylan Penn (granddaughter); Hopper Penn (grandson)

Leo Zalman Penn (August 27, 1921 – September 5, 1998) was an American television director and actor. He was the father of musician Michael Penn and actors Sean and Chris Penn.

== Early life ==
Penn was born in Lawrence, Massachusetts, the son of a Russian-Jewish immigrant mother, Elizabeth (née Melincoff; 1890–1961) and Maurice Daniel Penn (né Pinon; 1897–1981), who was of Lithuanian-Jewish descent. Leo Penn served in the United States Army Air Forces during World War II as a B-24 Liberator bombardier with the 755th Bomb Squadron, 458th Bomb Group, stationed in England as part of the Eighth Air Force.

== Career ==
A life member of The Actors Studio, Penn won the Theatre World Award in 1954 for his performance in the play The Girl on the Via Flaminia. He acted in numerous roles in the early years of television. In 1956, he was cast as Mr. Rico in the episode "Ringside Padre" of the religion anthology series Crossroads. In 1957, he appeared in the episode "One If by Sea" of the military drama series, Navy Log. He was also cast in an episode of Beverly Garland's 1957–1958 groundbreaking crime drama Decoy. In 1960, he played Cavage in "The Poker Fiend" on Richard Boone's CBS western series Have Gun – Will Travel. In 1961, he was cast as Tiko in the episode "The World Is Her Oyster" of the ABC adventure series The Islanders, set in the South Pacific, and appeared in an episode of the ABC crime drama The Asphalt Jungle. He also appeared in another ABC adventure series Straightaway, which focuses on automobile racing. On March 3, 1961, he co-starred with Peter Falk and Joyce Van Patten in the episode "Cold Turkey" of the ABC legal drama series The Law and Mr. Jones starring James Whitmore. About this time, he also appeared on Pat O'Brien's ABC sitcom Harrigan and Son. In the 1961–1962 television season, Penn acted in the CBS crime drama Checkmate in the episode "The Button-Down Break" and starred as Jerry Green in Gertrude Berg's CBS's sitcom Mrs. G. Goes to College renamed at mid-season as The Gertrude Berg Show. He played the role of Father Gitzgerald in season 3 episode 20 of Matlock The Priest.

Penn landed work as a director for many television series, including I Spy, Lost in Space, Cannon, Star Trek, Blue Light, Custer, the 1976 western Sara, St. Elsewhere, Kojak, Starsky and Hutch, Cagney & Lacey, Little House on the Prairie, Columbo, Hawaii Five-O, Trapper John, M.D., Hart to Hart, Magnum, P.I., and Father Murphy. In 1983, he was nominated for an Emmy Award for Outstanding Directing in a Drama Series for The Mississippi.

== Politics ==
Penn supported the Hollywood trade unions and refused to accuse others to the House Un-American Activities Committee in their investigation of suspected Communist infiltration of the film industry. He was subsequently blacklisted, and Paramount refused to renew his contract. As a result, Penn was not able to work as a movie actor. He found acting work in television, but CBS ousted him after receiving an anonymous accusation that he had addressed a Communist political meeting. Barred from acting in film or TV, he became a director.

== Personal life and death ==
Penn married Eileen Ryan in 1957, and they had three sons: Michael Penn, Sean Penn, and Chris Penn. He died from lung cancer at Saint John's Health Center in Santa Monica, California, on September 5, 1998, at the age of 77.

== Filmography ==
Year	Title	Role	Notes
1946	The Best Years of Our Lives	ATC Corporal	Uncredited
1947	Fall Guy	Tom Cochrane	
1949	The Undercover Man	Sydney Gordon	
1949	Not Wanted	Steve Ryan	
1959	The Story on Page One	Morrie Goetz	
1962	Birdman of Alcatraz	Eddie Kassellis	Uncredited
1966	A Man Called Adam		Director
1970	Quarantined		Director
1973	Columbo: Any Old Port in a Storm		Director
1977	Sixth and Main	Doc	
1977	Little House on the Prairie		Director
1984	The Wild Life	Tom's Dad	
1988	Judgment in Berlin		Director
1995	The Crossing Guard	Hank	

1989 Matlock: The Priest Father Fitzgerald.
