= The Best of Disney Volume 2 =

The Best of Disney: Volume 2

Compilation album by Disney
- Released: 1978
- Genre: Children
- Label: Disneyland

Professional ratings
Review scores
Source	Rating
Allmusic	4/5 stars

The Best Of Disney Volume 2 is a compilation album of musical highlights from Disney film favorites.

== Track listing ==
1. "When You Wish Upon a Star" (Pinocchio) – Cliff Edwards
2. "A Spoonful of Sugar" (Mary Poppins) – Julie Andrews
3. "Little April Shower" (Bambi) – Disney Studio Chorus
4. "Oo-De-Lally" (Robin Hood) – Roger Miller
5. "Someone's Waiting for You" (The Rescuers) – Shelby Flint
6. "Disco Mouse (Mickey Mouse March)" (The New Mickey Mouse Club) – The Mouseketeers
7. "Supercalifragilisticexpialidocious" (Mary Poppins) – Julie Andrews & Dick Van Dyke
8. "Lavender Blue (Dilly Dilly)" (So Dear to My Heart) – Burl Ives
9. "The Wonderful Thing About Tiggers" (Winnie the Pooh and the Blustery Day) – Sam Edwards
10. "I've Got No Strings" (Pinocchio) – Dickie Jones
11. "You Can Fly" (Peter Pan) – The Jud Conlon Chorus & The Mellomen
12. "It's Not Easy" (Pete's Dragon) – Helen Reddy & Sean Marshall
