= Sharon Stevens =

Sharon Stevens may refer to:

- Sharon Stevens, reporter on KSDK
- Sharon Stevens, singer, past member of Boney M.
- Sharon Stevens, character in All Tied Up

== See also ==
- Candace Camp, writer who used pseudonym Sharon Stephens
- Sharon Stephen
