= Convergence (2015 film) =

- Directed by: Drew Hall
- Written by: Drew Hall
- Produced by: Scott Robinson
- Starring: Clayne Crawford; Ethan Embry; Mykelti Williamson
- Cinematography: Kevin Duggin
- Edited by: Shane Hazen
- Music by: Patrick Kirst
- Production companies: Frame 29 Films; Drama Free Zone
- Distributed by: Dark Sky Films
- Release date: April 26, 2015
- Running time: 100 minutes
- Country: United States
- Language: English

Convergence is a 2015 American horror film written and directed by Drew Hall. It stars Clayne Crawford as a police detective who, after being caught in an explosion, is sent to recover at a nearly-empty hospital that may be haunted. Ethan Embry and Mykelti Williamson co-star. It premiered at the FirstGlance Film Festival in April 2015 and was released in the United States on February 5, 2016.

== Plot ==
In 1999, after an explosion at a women's health clinic in Atlanta, police detective Ben Walls is called back into active duty while on leave. As he investigates the scene, a second explosion goes off, and he loses consciousness. He wakes up at a hospital, and captain Miller, his superior officer, orders him to stay in bed. Eager to contact his wife and return to duty, he dresses and leaves his room, finding the hospital nearly empty. A nurse explains that most of the hospital's workers have been redirected toward a major fire in the city, which Walls assumes is the clinic bombing. The nurse directs him to a chapel, where she says several people are gathered. He finds Miller there with Ester, Jude, and Isaac. Miller gives him change to contact his wife at a payphone.

After calling his wife, Walls can only speak a few words before the line goes dead. He attempts to leave the hospital, only to find the door locked. A security guard named Peter "Grace" Grayson offers to let Walls use the phone in his office, though the line turns out dead. Grayson says he knew Walls' parents, but a man in a paramedic's uniform shoots Grayson before he can explain further. Walls binds Grayson's wound and chases the paramedic, who knocks him unconscious. Because he is not wearing his glasses, Walls does not get a good look at the man's face. Walls reports the attack to Miller, but the nurse says Grayson's body is missing. Miller and the others from the chapel believe a man named Daniel to be responsible, though they do not tell Walls.

Daniel, the paramedic, captures Jude and questions him about his belief in God. Jude says he no longer believes in God, and Daniel cuts out Jude's tongue when he curses God. After branding Jude with his cult's symbol, Daniel gains control over him. Daniel lures away the nurse when he says he has found Grayson, and he gains control over her, too, after branding her. After the nurse attacks him, Walls has a vision of his body in the hospital. Grayson briefly appears before him and explains that the situation is more complicated than being dead. Walls confronts Miller, demanding to know why nobody told him the truth, and Miller says that he was prohibited from doing so because of the rules. Miller orders the others to hide while he stays behind to face Daniel and his cult, but Isaac insists on helping Miller.

As Isaac and Miller engage in a shootout with Daniel's followers, Walls and Ester discuss grace in Christianity. Ester says that grace is the only way to escape the hospital, which is a test of their faith. Walls, whose parents were missionaries killed in a bombing, expresses his skepticism in religion. Isaac disappears when he enters the chapel, and Miller is shot. Daniel stops his followers from killing Miller, and they search for Ester. Walls finds Miller and helps him to the chapel, where Miller also disappears after expressing his faith. Walls tricks the nurse into entering the chapel, and Ester kills her there. She disappears after entering the chapel, though Walls is confused when he does not. In a vision, Grayson explains it is because he is not ready.

Walls encounters two ghost hunters, Kris and Casey, who explain they are from 2015 and investigating the 1999 clinic bombing. They ask Walls to discover Daniel's conspirator. Daniel reveals he was a member of Walls' parents' congregation but broke away when they adopted a more loving and inclusive message. Enraged at their perceived heresy, Daniel bombed their church. As the ghost hunters flee, Walls captures Daniel and tortures him for the name of his conspirator, to Casey's shock. Before she leaves, Walls gives his recovered glasses to Casey, who returns them to his wife, Hannah. On the news, Hannah is relieved to see that Daniel's conspirator has finally been caught.

== Cast ==
- Clayne Crawford as Ben Walls
- Ethan Embry as Daniel
- Mykelti Williamson as Captain Miller
- Gary Grubbs as Peter Grayson
- Chelsea Bruland as Nurse
- Catalina Soto-Aguilar as Casey
- Casey Myers as Kris
- Laura Cayouette as Ester
- Alyshia Ochse as Hannah Walls
- Philip Fornah as Jude
- Mike Kimmel as Isaac

== Production ==
Daniel's cult was based on the Army of God, a Christian terrorist organization headquartered in Alabama, where writer-director Drew Hall grew up. Hall initially planned to release two different versions of the film, which would converge to tell a whole story, one from Walls' point of view and another from the ghost hunters. This was abandoned, and the ghost hunter footage was integrated into Walls' story. Shooting took place at an abandoned hospital in Mobile, Alabama. Hall described the film's theme as finding redemption through grace, instead of seeking revenge.

== Release ==
Convergence premiered at the FirstGlance Film Festival on April 26, 2015. Dark Sky Films gave it a limited release in the United States on February 5, 2016. Four days later, it was released digitally and on home video.

== Reception ==
Though he complimented the acting, directing, and production design, Frank Scheck of The Hollywood Reporter said the story is too complex and difficult for audiences to understand. Pete Vonder Haar of The Village Voice wrote that the film keeps audiences unbalanced, which is good for a supernatural horror film, but the explanations highlight the story's weaknesses. Shawn Macomber of Fangoria rated it 3/4 stars and wrote that it "rather brilliantly conjures up a thought-provoking, at times quite unsettling vision of one (seemingly) forsaken corner of this post-death persistence". Matt Boiselle of Dread Central rated it 4/5 stars and called it "a fun film that will give you the chills as well as make your minds work a little overtime". Mark L. Miller of Ain't It Cool News wrote, "Convergence is a wild ride of a film that may not be successful in all of its beats, but I left this movie more impressed with the way it all plays out than I thought I would."

Convergence won Best Film and Best of the Fest at the FirstGlance Film Festival.
