= Candle on the Water =

Song written by Al Kasha and Joel Hirschhorn

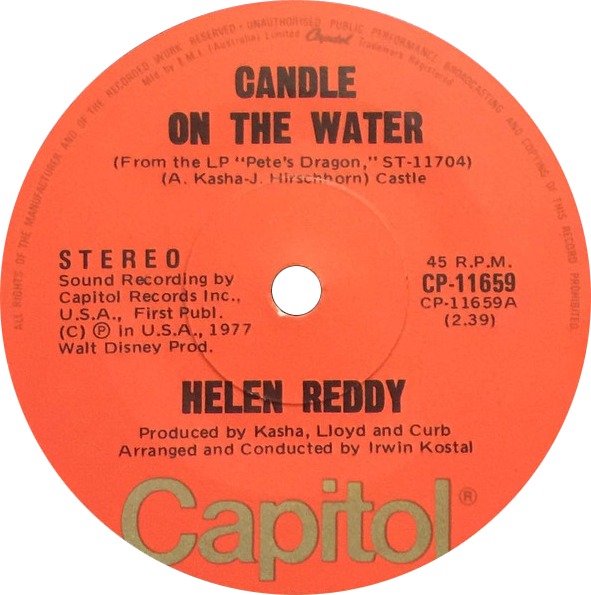
- Side A of the Australian single

Single by Helen Reddy

from the album Pete's Dragon
- Released: 1977
- Length: 3:05
- Songwriters: Al Kasha; Joel Hirschhorn
- Producer: Jerad Anderson

"Candle on the Water" is a torch song written by Al Kasha and Joel Hirschhorn for Walt Disney Pictures' 1977 live-action/animated film Pete's Dragon. Originally recorded by Helen Reddy, who plays Nora in the film, the song was nominated for the Academy Award for Best Original Song in 1977, though it lost to "You Light Up My Life".

== Context ==
The setting for the song is entirely on the lantern-room balcony of the lighthouse in which Nora and her father, Lampie, live. Nora sings the song to her fiancé Paul, who has been lost at sea for over a year but Nora believes will one day return.

Immediately prior to the song, Lampie had scolded Nora, telling her to accept that Paul is no doubt dead and will never return, only to apologize for his outburst. Dismayed, Nora retires to the lighthouse balcony and sings toward the ocean, assuring Paul that she is still waiting for him.

"Candle on the Water" was originally intended to be the only song featured in the film, but when it met with such acclaim, the decision was made to turn the film into a musical. According to Helen Reddy, she was told by Kasha and Hirschhorn that "they deliberately placed religious and spiritual symbols within the song."

== Chart performance ==
=== Helen Reddy's version ===
Chart (1978)	Peak position
U.S. Billboard Adult Contemporary	27

== Cover versions ==
In 1979, the song was covered by Swedish singer Kikki Danielsson, translated in Swedish as "Jag är ditt ljus på mörka vatten" by Swedish translator Doreen Denning (sv), for Danielsson's album Rock'n Yodel.

A cover was released on December 14, 2014, by musical group ミラクルミュージカル (Miracle Musical). The track was dedicated to the memory of Diem Brown and Trevelyn Grace Campbell.

"Candle on the Water" has been sung on the DisneyMania 4 album by Anneliese van der Pol. It was also sung briefly by Kristin Chenoweth and an unidentified a cappella group in the dramedy Pushing Daisies in the episode "The Legend of Merle McQuoddy".

This song was also performed by Okkervil River for the 2016 remake of Pete's Dragon.

== Bibliography ==
- Whitburn, Joel (2007), Joel Whitburn Presents Billboard Top Adult Songs, 1961-2006, Record Research Inc., ISBN 978-0898201697
