= Tracy Griffith =

American actress

- Born: Tracy Lee Griffith; October 19, 1965 (age 60); New York City, U.S.
- Occupations: Actress, chef, artist, singer
- Years active: 1984–present
- Spouse: Mark Daley (m. 2011)
- Relatives: Melanie Griffith (half-sister); Dakota Johnson (half-niece)

Tracy Lee Griffith (born October 19, 1965) is an American actress, sushi chef, singer, and painter.

== Early life ==
Griffith was raised in Bedford, New York, the daughter of actor and producer Peter Griffith and his second wife, model and actress Nanita Greene. Her younger brother is Clay Griffith, who became a production designer and set decorator. Her paternal half-sister is actress Melanie Griffith. In the early 1970s, she moved with her family to Saint John, U.S. Virgin Islands. Her parents separated in 1975. Griffith attended a boarding school in Maryland, graduating in 1979, and went on to spend three years at the University of Tennessee where she became interested in acting and dropped out in 1984.

== Acting career ==
Tracy Griffith played supporting roles in some films in which her half-sister Melanie starred, such as Fear City (1985) and Crazy in Alabama (1999). After college, Griffith worked in Hollywood and New York for the next 12 years. Her acting credits include The Guiding Light, The Good Mother (1988); Fast Food (1989); The First Power (1990); The Finest Hour (1991); All Tied Up (1993); 21 Jump Street; and the miniseries Ruby Ridge: An American Tragedy. She was a regular on the ABC drama series The Monroes (1995).

== Sushi chef ==
Griffith was the first female graduate of the California Sushi Academy and one of the world's first certified female sushi chefs. She worked as the featured sushi chef at Tsunami's in Beverly Hills. She also was a partner and chef at Rika's on Sunset, a sushi restaurant on the Sunset Strip in Los Angeles. Griffith developed a style of sushi without raw fish. This led to a publishing deal for her cookbook Sushi American Style, which was published by Clarkson Potter in August 2004 and released a second book in 2013 titled Stealth Health: Lunches Kids Love, which features recipes that children can make themselves.

Griffith starred as the chef and host on the recurring Cooking with D.I.Y. series and Celebrity Hobbies on the D.I.Y. Network.

== Other ventures ==
In 2006, Griffith released a CD titled Red, on the Miura label. A landscape painter of the Napa Valley area, she had her first gallery show in San Francisco in 2011. In January 2018, she had a solo exhibition at the Rebecca Hossack Gallery in London, titled Herd. She moved to Florence, Alabama, where she opened her own art gallery in 2019.

== Personal life ==
Griffith married fashion executive Mark Daley on September 17, 2011.

== Filmography ==
Film
Year	Film	Role	Notes
1984	Fear City	Sandra Cook	
1988	The Good Mother	Babe	
1989	Sleepaway Camp III: Teenage Wasteland	Marcia Holland	
1989	Fast Food	Samantha Brooks	
1990	The First Power	Tess Seaton	
1992	The Finest Hour	Barbara	
1993	All Tied Up	Sharon Stevens	
1993	Skeeter	Sarah Crosby	
1996	Joe & Joe	Flora Brown	
1999	Crazy in Alabama	Samantha's Stand-in	

Television
Year	Film	Role	Notes
1986	Guiding Light	Emily	Episode: "February 21, 1986"
1989	Family Ties	Holly Parker	Episode: "The Freshman and the Senior"
1989	21 Jump Street	Linda McHugh	Episode: "Eternal Flame"
1993	For Love and Glory	Rebecca Morgan	Television film
1993	Message from Nam	Gabrielle "Gabby" Wilson	Television film
1994	Hoggs' Heaven	Hogg Sister #1	Television film
1995	The Marshal	Rabbit Junkins	Episode: "Natural Law"
1995	The Monroes	Ruby Monroe	8 episodes
1996	The Siege at Ruby Ridge	Gwen Coulter	Miniseries
1998	Their Second Chance	Laurie	Television film
1998	Circle of Deceit	Donna Avedon	Television film
2000	Murder in the Mirror	Dona	Television film
2003	The Division	Ruth	Episode: "Bewitched, Bothered and Bewildered"
