= Soul of the Game =

1996 television film directed by Kevin Rodney Sullivan

- Genre: Drama; History; Sport
- Teleplay by: David Himmelstein
- Story by: Gary Hoffman
- Directed by: Kevin Rodney Sullivan
- Starring: Blair Underwood; Delroy Lindo; Mykelti Williamson; Edward Herrmann; R. Lee Ermey; Harvey Williams
- Music by: Lee Holdridge
- Country of origin: United States
- Original language: English

Production
- Executive producers: Kevin Kelly Brown; Gary Hoffman; Mike Medavoy
- Producer: Robert Papazian
- Production locations: Birmingham, Alabama; Huntingburg, Indiana; League Stadium - 1st & Cherry Streets, Huntingburg, Indiana; Los Angeles; Ontario; Pasadena, California; St. Louis; Rickwood Field - 1137 2nd Avenue W, Birmingham, Alabama
- Cinematography: Sandi Sissel
- Editor: Victor Du Bois
- Running time: 94 minutes
- Production companies: Gary Hoffman Productions; HBO Pictures; Mike Medavoy Productions

Original release
- Network: HBO
- Release: April 20, 1996

Soul of the Game (released as Field of Honour in the United Kingdom) is a 1996 television film about Negro league baseball.

The film stars Blair Underwood as Jackie Robinson, Delroy Lindo as Satchel Paige, Mykelti Williamson as Josh Gibson, and Harvey Williams as "Cat" Mays, the father of Willie Mays. The film depicts Paige and Gibson as the pitching and hitting stars, respectively, of the Negro leagues in the period immediately following World War II. Robinson is an up-and-coming player on Paige's team, the Kansas City Monarchs.

== Plot ==
Branch Rickey is the general manager of the Brooklyn Dodgers who is determined to integrate Major League Baseball. He begins sending his scouts to Negro league games to find the best players. Rickey directs his scouts to look not only at playing ability but also at the players' maturity and capacity to withstand the hostility that is sure to be directed

== Cast ==
=== Main ===
- Delroy Lindo as Satchel Paige
- Mykelti Williamson as Josh Gibson
- Edward Herrmann as Branch Rickey
- Blair Underwood as Jackie Robinson
- R. Lee Ermey as Wilkie
- Salli Richardson-Whitfield as Lahoma (credited as Salli Richardson)
- Gina Ravera as Grace
- Obba Babatundé as Cum Posey
- Cylk Cozart as Zo Perry
- J.D. Hall as Gus Greenlee
- Jerry Hardin as Happy Chandler
- Brent Jennings as Frank Duncan
- Richard Riehle as Pete Harmon
- Armand Asselin as Rip
- Joey Banks as Link Rudolph

=== Supporting ===
- Paul Bates as Orderly #1
- Bruce Beatty as Reporter
- Guy Boyd as Clark Griffith
- Stacye P. Branche as Ella Fitzgerald
- Gregg Burge as Bill Robinson
- Ed Cambridge as Bellhop
- Mimi Cozzens as Jane Rickey
- Daniel Estrin as Paperboy
- Zaid Farid as Clerk
- Edith Fields as Nurse
- Erika Flores as Girl
- Holiday Freeman as Lillian, The Secretary
- Jesse D. Goins as John Givens Reporter
- Tracy Holliway as Marian Anderson
- David Johnson as Roy Campanella
- Johnny G. Jones as Hotel Manager
- Jonathon Lamer as Cardinal
- Joseph Latimore as Jesse Williams
- William Bruce Lukens as Umpire #3
- Bob Minor as Goon #2
- Edwin "EdVanz'd" Morrow as Young Willie Mays (credited as Edwin Morrow)
- Jon Pennell as Steve Buckley
- Alex Rascovar as Boy
- Lou Richards as Baseball Announcer
- Terrence Riggins as Orderly #2
- Joe Rodriguez as Dodger
- Al Rossi as Mayor Fiorello LaGuardia
- Kevin Sifuentes as Waiter
- Tim Snay as Umpire #1
- Charles C. Stevenson Jr. as Supervisor
- Darnell Suttles as Goon #1
- Arthur Tipp as Umpire, Home Plate
- Isaiah Washington as Adult Willie Mays
- Harvey Williams as Cat Mays
- Oscar Williams as Grays Manager

=== Cameos ===
- Sean Blakemore as Grace's Husband
- Jeff Coopwood as Stadium Announcer
- Jimmy Ortega as El Gigante, Cuban Baseball Player

== Reception ==
Review aggregator Rotten Tomatoes gives the film a 67% rating based on six reviews. Audiences gave the film a 67% rating based on 114 reviews.

== See also ==
- List of baseball films
