= The Fitzpatricks =

- Genre: Drama
- Starring: Bert Kramer; Mariclare Costello; Clark Brandon; Jimmy McNichol
- Composer: John Rubinstein
- Country of origin: United States
- Original language: English
- No. of seasons: 1
- No. of episodes: 13

Production
- Production locations: Warner Brothers Burbank Studios - 4000 Warner Boulevard, Burbank, California
- Running time: 60 minutes
- Production company: Warner Bros. Television

Original release
- Network: CBS
- Release: September 5, 1977 – January 10, 1978

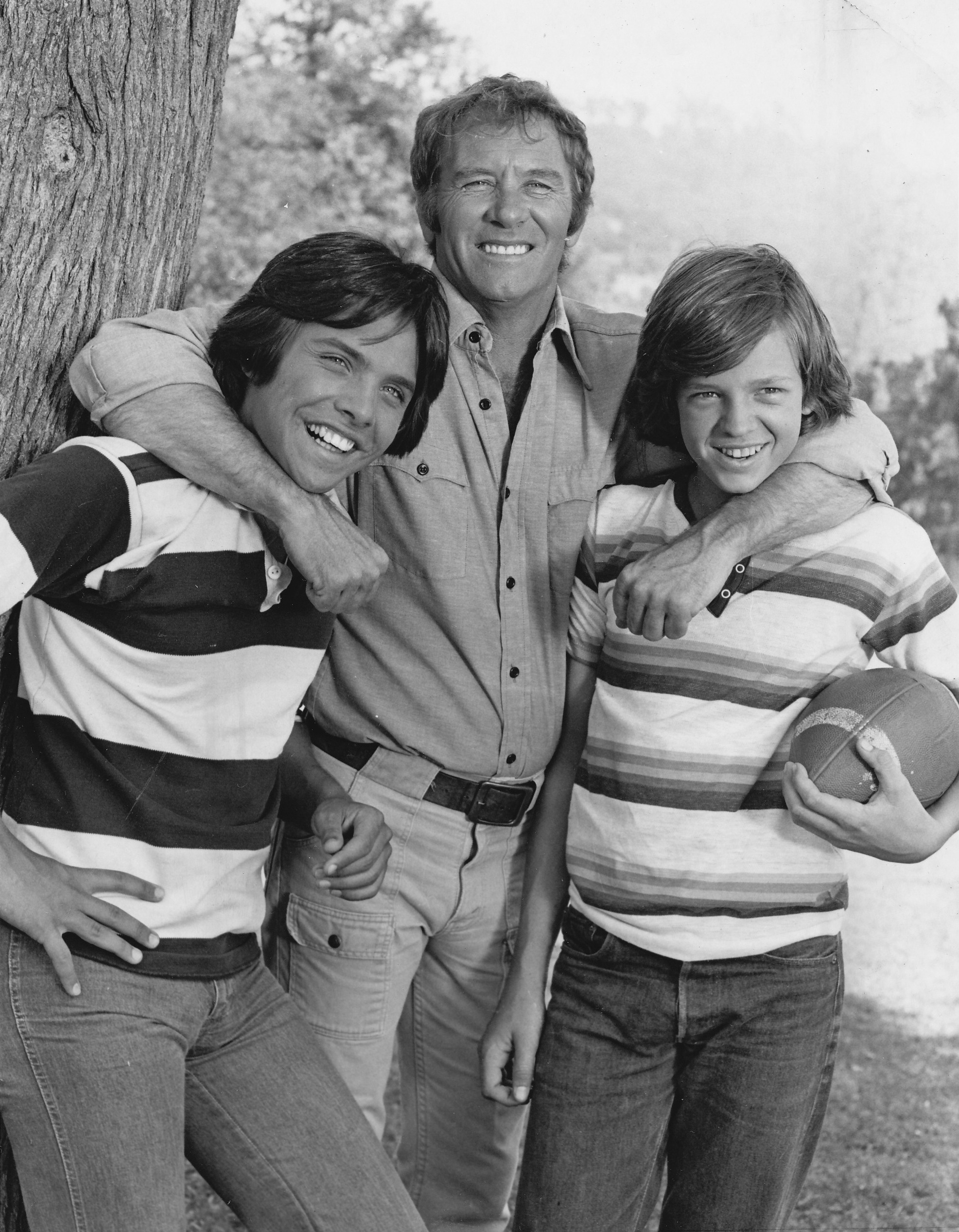
L-R: Clark Brandon, Bert Kramer, and Jimmy McNichol (1977)

The Fitzpatricks is an American drama series which ran on CBS during the 1977–78 season. The series premiered on September 5, 1977; it lasted thirteen episodes, and was cancelled on January 10, 1978, failing in the faces of established ABC competitors Happy Days and Laverne & Shirley, which both aired in the show's time-slot of 8:00-9:00 PM Eastern/Pacific on Tuesday nights.

== Plot ==
The focus was on the Fitzpatricks, an Irish Catholic family of six who lived in Flint, Michigan. The father, blue collar Mike Fitzpatrick, (Bert Kramer) worked overtime as a steelworker to provide a life for the family; while his pregnant wife, Maggie (Mariclare Costello) also worked part-time at a diner as a waitress to help support the family's income. They had four children, eldest son Sean (Clark Brandon); introspective second son, Jack (Jimmy McNichol); only daughter Maureen (nicknamed Mo) (Michele Tobin) and youngest son, Max (Sean Marshall). At various times, all of the Fitzpatrick children had held down part-time jobs to help the often cash-strapped family. They also owned a dog, aptly named Detroit. Also involved in the family was R.J. (Derek Wells), who was Max Fitzpatrick's African-American best friend. A young Helen Hunt played neighbor Kerry Gerardi, supposedly a friend of Mo's, who was interested in the older Fitzpatrick brothers, Sean and Jack, which sparked a bit of a rivalry between the two. Much of the stories deal with moral lessons and also with growing up.

== Cast ==
- Bert Kramer as Michael Fitzpatrick, a steelworker, and the patriarch of the family
- Mariclare Costello as Margaret "Maggie" Fitzpatrick, the matriarch, who works part-time at a diner to supplement the family income
- Clark Brandon as Sean Fitzpatrick, the oldest son (16)
- Jimmy McNichol as Jack Fitzpatrick, the second oldest (15)
- Michele Tobin as Maureen "Mo" Fitzpatrick, the only daughter (14)
- Sean Marshall as Max Fitzpatrick, the youngest son (10), who delivers newspapers
- Helen Hunt as Kerry Gerardi, the girl next door, who intensified the rivalry between Jack and Sean
- Derek Wells as R.J., Max Fitzpatrick's best friend

== Episodes ==
| No. | Title | Directed by | Written by | Original release date |
|---|---|---|---|---|
| 1 | "Pilot" | Gene Reynolds | Unknown | September 5, 1977 |
| 2 | "FitzJo Co." | Harvey S. Laidman | Unknown | September 20, 1977 |
| 3 | "The Shark" | Marc Daniels | Rod Peterson & Katharyn Powers & Claire Whittaker | September 27, 1977 |
| 4 | "Superman" | Harvey S. Laidman | Dana Reno Andrews & Katharyn Powers | October 4, 1977 |
| 5 | "Halloween" | Unknown | Dana Reno Andrews & Katharyn Powers | October 11, 1977 |
| 6 | "The Cheerleader" | Harvey S. Laidman | Rod Peterson & Claire Whittaker | October 25, 1977 |
| 7 | "A Love Story" | Peter Tewksbury | Johnny Bonaduce | November 8, 1977 |
| 8 | "Marijuana" | Stuart Margolin | Dana Reno Andrews & Katharyn Powers | November 22, 1977 |
| 9 | "The Sacrament" | Lawrence Dobkin | Herman Groves & Kathryn Powers | November 29, 1977 |
| 10 | "Say Goodbye to Buddy Bonkers" | Robert Totten | Michael A. Hoey & Bruce Belland | December 6, 1977 |
| 11 | "Runaway" | Peter Tewksbury | Dennis Landa | December 20, 1977 |
| 12 | "A Living Wage" | Joseph Manduke | Carmen Culver | January 3, 1978 |
| 13 | "The New Fitzpatrick" | Georg Stanford Brown | Dana Reno Andrews & Katharyn Powers | January 10, 1978 |
