= The Fourth War =

1990 film by John Frankenheimer

- Directed by: John Frankenheimer
- Screenplay by: Kenneth Ross
- Story by: Stephen Peters
- Produced by: Wolf Schmidt
- Starring: Roy Scheider; Jürgen Prochnow; Tim Reid; Lara Harris; Harry Dean Stanton
- Cinematography: Gerry Fisher
- Edited by: Robert F. Shugrue
- Music by: Bill Conti
- Production company: Kodiak Films Inc
- Distributed by: Cannon Films
- Release date: March 23, 1990
- Running time: 91 minutes
- Country: United States
- Language: English
- Budget: $14.5 million
- Box office: $1.3 million

The Fourth War is a 1990 American cold war drama film directed by John Frankenheimer. It is set in West Germany of the late 1980s, and was filmed in Alberta, Canada. It stars Roy Scheider and Jürgen Prochnow as two military men whose personal dispute threatens to escalate into a larger conflict.

== Plot ==
Colonel Jack Knowles is a tough, professional soldier who was decorated for gallantry in Vietnam. The same gung ho mentality that made Knowles a hero in wartime makes him a dangerous loose cannon in peacetime. He is stationed at an outpost on the West German-Czechoslovakia border and immediately gets into a dangerous personal war with his Soviet counterpart, Colonel Valachev.

The two men ironically have many of the same characteristics. Knowles is enraged when he has to stand by as a Czech asylum seeker is shot on the border. Knowles immediately begins crossing the border on dangerous solo night missions to sabotage the enemy installations. Knowles comes into conflict with his by the book second-in-command Lieutenant Colonel Clark, and Knowles' superior, General Hackworth, angrily orders him to desist, but to no avail.

The petty war between the two colonels threatens to escalate into a full scale conflict as they engage in hand-to-hand combat on a frozen lake on the border, with armed units from their respective countries arriving. Oblivious to anything outside their personal fight, the two men only relent when they finally notice their heavily armed forces – with assault rifles, tanks and attack helicopters aimed at each other – watching the brawl.

== Cast ==
- Roy Scheider as Jack Knowles
- Jürgen Prochnow as Valachev
- Tim Reid as Lyons / Colonel Clark
- Lara Harris as Elena
- Harry Dean Stanton as General Hackworth

== Production ==
The story was based on an original concept by a Los Angeles writer, Stephen Peters. The script was rewritten and updated by Kenneth Ross, who had previously worked with Frankenheimer. The title comes from a famous quote by Albert Einstein: "I know not with what weapons World War III will be fought, but World War IV will be fought with sticks and stones." Frankenheimer and Scheider, both antiwar advocates, were not happy with the film's title, and other titles such as Game of Honor and Face Off were discussed.

Filming took place in Alberta, Canada. It was shot over ten weeks, in locations near where the 1988 Winter Olympics had been held. After unusually warm weather in 1988 there were concerns that the snow would not hold and they would need to create artificial snow instead. During filming in February, temperatures in southern Alberta dropped to 40 below zero which caused some difficulties. During a fight scene, Scheider cracked a rib and Prochnow dislocated his knee.

== Reception ==
=== Critical response ===
On the review aggregator website Rotten Tomatoes, 64% of 11 critics' reviews are positive, with an average rating of 5.8/10. Metacritic, which uses a weighted average, assigned the film a score of 57 out of 100, based on 15 critics, indicating "mixed or average" reviews.

Variety called it "a well-made Cold War thriller" and praised the casting, as well as Frankenheimer's direction for having "an eye for comic relief as well as tension maintenance". Roger Ebert of the Chicago Sun-Times gave it 3 out of 4 and wrote: "The Fourth War is essentially a psychological study of a man coming apart at the hinges."

Entertainment Weekly's Owen Gleiberman gave it a B− and wrote: "The Fourth War is an old-soldiers-never-die movie—an ironic elegy—and though much of the story is contrived and second-rate, Scheider gives a richly felt performance." Michael Wilmington of the Los Angeles Times wrote: "The Fourth War doesn't make much sense, but it's powerfully acted and beautifully directed."

=== Box Office ===
Released in the United States and Canada, The Fourth War was a box-office bomb, grossing $1.3 million at the box office, against a budget of $14.5 million.
