= Nobody's Fool (1986 film) =

1986 film by Evelyn Purcell

- Theatrical release poster
- Directed by: Evelyn Purcell
- Written by: Beth Henley
- Produced by: Cary Brokaw
- Starring: Rosanna Arquette; Eric Roberts; Mare Winningham; Jim Youngs; Louise Fletcher
- Cinematography: Mikhail Suslov
- Edited by: Dennis Virkler
- Music by: James Newton Howard
- Distributed by: Island Pictures
- Release date: November 7, 1986
- Running time: 107 minutes
- Country: United States
- Language: English
- Budget: $3.6 million
- Box office: $563,358

Nobody's Fool is a 1986 comedy film written by playwright Beth Henley. It stars Rosanna Arquette, Eric Roberts and Mare Winningham.

== Plot ==
Cassie (Rosanna Arquette) who seeks love and escape from her mundane ordinary life meets a traveling Shakespeare troupe offering a community acting workshop.

== Cast ==
- Rosanna Arquette as Cassie
- Eric Roberts as Riley
- Mare Winningham as Pat
- Jim Youngs as Billy
- Louise Fletcher as Pearl
- Gwen Welles Shirley
- Stephen Tobolowsky as Kirk
- Charlie Barnett as Nick
- J.J. Hardy as Ralphy
- William Steis as Frank
- Belita Moreno as Jane
- Lewis Arquette as Mr. Fry
- Ronnie Claire Edwards as Bingo
- Ann Hearn as Linda
- Scott Rosensweig as Winston
- Cheli Ann Chew as Prissy Lee

== Reception ==
=== Critical response ===
Film critic Michael Wilmington of the Los Angeles Times wrote in his review: "Nobody's Fool doesn't really jell, but it's still a sometimes rhapsodically goofy experience. If Arquette doesn't really hold the center together, she at least flies off ravishingly at the edges. The movie is a fond valentine to the special salvations of theater. It's an ode to a squeezed heartland, small-town desperation and sheer, stunning blind love."

=== Release ===
Nobody's Fool was released on November 7, 1986 in 290 theatres and grossed $258,100 in its opening weekend.

The film was released on DVD on January 25, 2005, by MGM Home Entertainment.
