= Dirty Little Billy =

1972 film by Stan Dragoti

- Promotional poster
- Directed by: Stan Dragoti
- Screenplay by: Charles Moss; Stan Dragoti
- Story by: Charles Moss; Stan Dragoti
- Produced by: Jack L. Warner
- Starring: Michael J. Pollard; Richard Evans; Charles Aidman; Lee Purcell
- Cinematography: Ralph Woolsey
- Edited by: David Wages
- Music by: Sascha Burland
- Color process: Eastmancolor
- Production company: WRG/Dragoti Productions Ltd.
- Distributed by: Columbia Pictures
- Release dates: October 20, 1972 (Premiere); October 25, 1972 (San Francisco)
- Running time: 92 minutes
- Country: United States
- Language: English

Dirty Little Billy is a 1972 American revisionist western film co-written and directed by Stan Dragoti and starring Michael J. Pollard and Richard Evans. Set in Coffeyville, Kansas, the film was influenced by the darker, more sinister style of Spaghetti Westerns and offered a unique insight into the beginnings of the titular notorious outlaw. It is notable for Nick Nolte's film debut, along with a background appearance for experimental filmmaker/artist William Ault.

== Plot ==
A tough and violent portrait of a psychopathic, yet fresh-faced youth—the infamous Billy the Kid in his grimy early days.

== Cast ==
- Michael J. Pollard as Billy Bonney
- Richard Evans as "Goldie"
- Lee Purcell as Berle
- Charles Aidman as Ben Antrim
- Dran Hamilton as Catherine McCarty
- Willard Sage as Henry McCarty
- Mills Watson as Ed
- Alex Wilson as Len
- Ronny Graham as Charles Nile
- Josip Elic as "Jawbone"
- Richard Stahl as Earl Lovitt
- Gary Busey as Basil Crabtree
- Dick Van Patten as Berle's Customer
- Scott Walker as "Stormy"
- Rosary Nix as "Louisiana"
- Frank Welker as Young Punk
- Craig Bovia as Buffalo Hunter
- Severn Darden as Jim "Big Jim" McDaniel
- Henry Proach as Lloyd
- Len Lesser as "Slits"
- Ed Lauter as Tyler
- Nick Nolte as Town Gang Leader (Uncredited)

== Release ==
The film premiered at the San Francisco Film Festival on October 20, 1972, before opening at the Vogue Theatre in San Francisco five days later.

== Reception ==
Steven Puchalski wrote in Shock Cinema magazine:

This is not typical, Tinseltown western though. It's more like The Making of a Sociopath, with Michael J. Pollard starring as displaced, 17-year-old Billy Bonney, in the days leading up to his evolution into the notorious Billy the Kid ... this is the perfect role for Pollard. And though a little old to play a teenager (he was 33), he hands us a Billy who's perpetually victimized by bad luck, until he finally blows a gasket at the very end and sparks his future.

== See also ==
- List of American films of 1972
