= Olivia Brown =

American actress

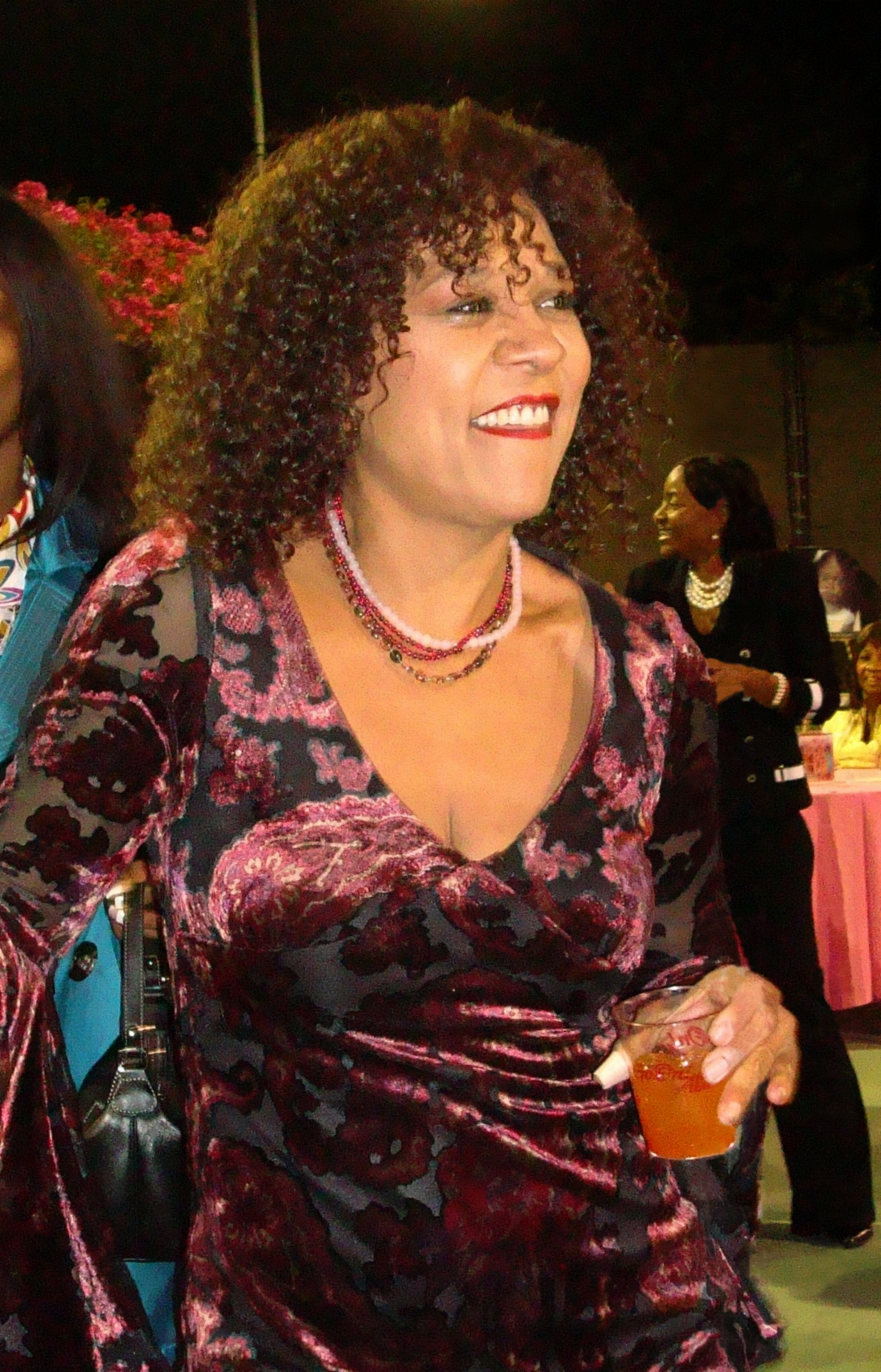
- Brown in 2007
- Born: 1956 or 1957 (age 69–70); Frankfurt, West Germany
- Occupation: Actress
- Years active: 1979–present
- Spouses: Mykelti Williamson (m. 1983; div. 1985): James Okonkwo
- Children: 2
- Relatives: Steve Brown (brother)

Olivia Brown (born 1956 or 1957) is an American actress, best known for her role as detective Trudy Joplin in the NBC crime drama series Miami Vice (1984–1989).

== Life and career ==
Brown was born in Frankfurt, West Germany, and raised in Sacramento, California. After graduating from C.K. McClatchy High School, she got a scholarship to Parsons School of Design in New York. However she didn't want to leave her family on the opposite side of the country, so she enrolled at Sacramento City College followed by Sacramento State College.

Brown made her big screen debut appearing in a supporting role in the 1982 action comedy film 48 Hrs. She later appeared in Streets of Fire (1984), Throw Momma from the Train (1987), Identity Crisis (1989), Man's Best Friend (1993) and All Tied Up (1994). From 1984 to 1989, she starred as Detective Trudy Joplin in the NBC crime drama series Miami Vice.

Brown guest-starred on T.J. Hooker, The Love Boat, Family Matters, The Fresh Prince of Bel-Air and Sister, Sister. She had recurring roles on Hill Street Blues, Designing Women, Lois & Clark: The New Adventures of Superman, Beverly Hills, 90210, Moesha and 7th Heaven. Brown also was regular in the NBC sitcom Dear John from 1990 to 1991.

== Personal life ==
Brown was married to Mykelti Williamson for two years, from 1983 until their divorce in 1985. She is currently married to James Okonkwo, with whom she has two children.

Her brother is Steve Brown, who played for the Houston Oilers of the NFL from 1983 until 1990.

== Filmography ==
=== Film ===
Year	Title	Role	Notes
1982	48 Hrs.	Candy	
1984	Streets of Fire	Addie	
1989	Throw Momma from the Train	Ms. Gladstone	
1989	Identity Crisis	Domino	
1990	Memories of Murder	Brenda	TV movie
1993	Man's Best Friend	Lab Assistant	
1994	All Tied Up	Tara	Video
1998	Mr. P's Dancing Sushi Bar	Natalie	
2009	Not Easily Broken	Mrs. Reid	
2010	Fast Lane	Mama	
2012	House Arrest	Rachel Willows	
2017	Our Dream Christmas	Stephanie Carter	

=== Television ===
Year	Title	Role	Notes
1983	T.J. Hooker	Rhoda	Episode: "Sweet Sixteen and Dead"
1983	For Love and Honor	Sammy	Episode: "For Love and Honor (Pilot)"
1983	Hill Street Blues	Vicki	Recurring cast: season 4
1986	The Love Boat	Lois Hendrix	Episode: "Spain Cruise: The Matadors: Parts 1 & 2"
1984-89	Miami Vice	Detective Trudy Joplin	Main cast
1989	Paradise	Belle	Episode: "All the Pretty Little Horses"
1989	Monsters	Jewel	Episode: "Love Hurts"
1989	Family Matters	Vanessa	Episode: "Stake-Out"
1990	Designing Women	Vanessa Hargraves	Recurring cast: Season 4
1990-91	Dear John	Denise	Recurring cast: season 3
1991	Roc	Nadine	Episode: "He's Gotta Have It"
1993	The Fresh Prince of Bel-Air	Lola	Episode: "You Bet Your Life"
1993	Out All Night	-	Episode: "Under My Thumb"
1994	The Sinbad Show	-	Episode: "David Goes Skiing"
1994	CBS Schoolbreak Special	Ms. Jackson	Episode: "Kids Killing Kids"
1995	Sister, Sister	Lucy	Episode: "Dream Lover"
1995-96	Lois & Clark: The New Adventures of Superman	Star	Recurring cast: Season 3
1996-03	7th Heaven	Patricia Hamilton	Recurring cast: season 1 & 3, guest: season 2 & 5 & 7
1997	Beverly Hills, 90210	Professor Langely	Recurring cast: season 3
1997	The Gregory Hines Show	Cheri	Episode: "Sofa So Good"
1998	Murder Call	Mrs. Bisley	Episode: "Skin Deep"
2001	Moesha	Barbara Lee	Recurring cast: season 6
