= The First Power =

1990 film by Robert Resnikoff

- Theatrical release poster
- Directed by: Robert Resnikoff
- Written by: Robert Resnikoff
- Produced by: David Madden
- Starring: Lou Diamond Phillips; Tracy Griffith; Jeff Kober; Mykel T. Williamson; Elizabeth Arlen
- Cinematography: Theo van de Sande
- Edited by: Michael Bloecher
- Music by: Stewart Copeland
- Production companies: Nelson Entertainment; Interscope Communications
- Distributed by: Orion Pictures
- Release date: April 6, 1990
- Running time: 98 minutes
- Country: United States
- Language: English
- Budget: $10 million (estimated)
- Box office: $22,424,195 (USA)

The First Power is a 1990 American neo-noir horror film written and directed by Robert Resnikoff and starring Lou Diamond Phillips, Tracy Griffith, Jeff Kober and Mykelti Williamson.

The film received mostly negative reviews but was a financial success.

== Plot ==
Russell Logan, a hotshot Los Angeles police detective who specializes in catching serial killers, is hunting the Pentagram Killer, a murderer nicknamed after his habit of carving a pentagram in his victims before killing them. Logan receives an anonymous phone call from a woman who offers to tell him the location of the killer's next attack if he promises that the killer will not be executed. Logan agrees, and the police stake out the suggested location for several days. Just as patience is waning, the killer abducts a policewoman from the location. Logan and his partner Franklin rush to the scene and find and apprehend the murderer before he can kill her.

The Pentagram Killer is revealed to be a Satan worshipper named Patrick Channing who is apparently eager to be executed. Logan goes back on his word to the anonymous caller and successfully advocates for the death penalty for Channing. Before the execution, Logan receives but ignores another anonymous call from the mystery woman pleading with him to prevent the execution.

After Channing dies in the gas chamber, Logan begins having visions and hearing Channing's voice. The policewoman that Logan and Franklin saved from him is found dead with a pentagram carved into her chest. Psychic Tess Seaton sees Channing in front of her in a parking lot. Tess is revealed as the anonymous caller who tipped off Logan. Understanding that Channing's Satanic rituals have allowed him to return as a demonic spirit and a dire threat, Tess goes to the police and tells Logan that she was the tipster. She explains that execution has empowered Channing, turning him into a spirit that can possess and act through weak-minded or fragile individuals. Rather than believing that Channing has returned, Logan suspects that Tess was an accomplice of Channing and is now helping to continue his work.

Logan and Franklin investigate Tess's apartment; Tess finds them there and tells Franklin that she senses he is in great danger. Outside, Franklin is trampled by a horse-drawn carriage. Logan pursues the driver to the top of a tall building, where it is revealed to be Channing. Channing leaps off the building and lands effortlessly, escaping. Soon after, another of Logan's colleagues is crucified on a bridge with a pentagram carved in his chest.

Channing lures Logan into a hotel where he plans to kill him, but Tess has a psychic premonition of this and arrives in time to warn and save Logan. Together Logan and Tess manage to evade the killer, with Logan now finally convinced that Channing has returned as a spirit able to possess others.

At Tess's suggestion, they visit Sister Marguerite, a nun knowledgeable about "The First Power" (resurrection), to learn how to stop Channing, but she turns them away. They then visit Channing's childhood home, where Tess's psychic visions reveal the terrible truth that Channing's grandfather was also his father, having raped his own daughter and then molested Channing.

Channing lures the duo into another trap; while they appear to kill him, the body suddenly becomes a police lieutenant whom Channing possessed and was acting through. That night Channing possesses a bag lady and kidnaps Tess from Logan's apartment, planning to ritually sacrifice her. In desperation Logan again visits Sister Marguerite, who relents and agrees to help. She explains that a crucifix knife she possesses can kill someone with the First Power of resurrection.

Logan and Marguerite track Channing to a water treatment plant. Logan finds and rescues Tess, killing Channing's bag lady body. Marguerite, wounded in the fight, is then possessed by Channing. After a prolonged struggle, Logan manages to stab Channing with the crucifix dagger just as police arrive and see him stabbing the body of Marguerite. They shoot Logan, then discover that the body is in fact Channing's.

Later, Tess visits Logan in the hospital, where she has either a dream or a psychic premonition of a possessed Logan waking and attacking her. Leaving it ambiguous on whether Channing's spirit still remains or if he's truly dead.

== Cast ==
- Lou Diamond Phillips as Detective Russell Logan
- Tracy Griffith as Tess Seaton
- Jeff Kober as Patrick Channing
- Mykelti Williamson as Detective Oliver Franklin
- Elizabeth Arlen as Sister Marguerite
- Dennis Lipscomb as Commander Perkns
- Carmen Argenziano as Lieutenant Al Grimes
- Clayton Landey as Detective Mazza
- Sue Giosa as Carmen
- Oz Tortora as Antonio
- Dan Tullis Jr. as Cop At Arrest
- Hansford Rowe as Father Brian
- Grand L. Bush as Reservoir Worker
- Bill Moseley as Bartender
- David Gale as Monsignor
- Philip Abbott as Cardinal
- J. Patrick McNamara as Priest
- Lynne Marta as Nun
- Brian Libby as Bum / Detective
- Nada Despotovich as Bag Lady
- Juliana McCarthy as Mrs. Channing, Patrick's Grandmother
- Charles Raymond as Gang Member #1
- Scott Lawrence as Gang Member #2

== Production ==
The movie began production under the title Transit. According to Time Out Magazine, Resnikoff took inspiration from convicted mass murderer Gary Gilmore, who believed in reincarnation and voiced his intentions to return after he was subjected to execution by firing squad by Utah Department of Corrections in 1977. Gilmore was also the subject of the 1979 non-fiction novel The Executioner's Song and the 1982 TV movie of the same name.

== Reception ==
The film received negative reviews, including Desson Howe's in the Washington Post, which called it "shopworn and imitative". In The New York Times, Vincent Canby wrote that Phillips "doesn't seem altogether comfortable here, but he certainly is not bad". He added that, despite the film's fast pace and impressive special effects, "the whole thing is seriously stupid". In 2016, Padraig Cotter writing for Dread Central stated that the film was "sloppy with the logic" in regards to the supernatural abilities of the villain. As of March 2026, The First Power has a 23% "rotten" rating on Rotten Tomatoes from 13 reviews.

In later years, it is considered a cult classic with its twist ending noted as similar to The Twilight Zone or Tales of the Unexpected. It is seen by some as the inspiration for the 1998 film, Fallen. It is also known to have been the favorite film of the late rapper Eazy-E.

== Novelization ==
The First Power was released as a novel by author Christian Francis in 2025, which features a different ending from the original film.
