= Hotshot (film) =

- Theatrical release poster
- Directed by: Rick King
- Screenplay by: Joe Sauter; Rick King
- Produced by: Steve Pappas
- Starring: Jim Youngs; Pelé; Billy Warlock; Weyman Thompson; Mario Van Peebles; David Groh
- Cinematography: Greg Andracke; Edgar Moura
- Edited by: Stan Salfas
- Music by: William Orbit
- Distributed by: Arista Films
- Release dates: November 21, 1986 (New Mexico); January 23, 1987 (United States)
- Running time: 94 minutes
- Country: United States
- Language: English

Hotshot is a 1986 American sports film directed by Rick King, who co-wrote the screenplay with Joe Sauter. The film stars Jim Youngs, Pelé, and Billy Warlock. Additional material was written by Ray Errol Fox and Bill Guttentag. It is also the film debut of actress Penelope Ann Miller.

== Plot ==
An American football player trying to make it big who turns to Pele, the greatest football player of all time, for guidance. A football player (Jim Youngs) leaves his rich family and goes to Brazil to learn from a master.

== Cast ==
- Jim Youngs as Jimmy Kristidis
- Pelé as Santos
- Billy Warlock as Vinnie Fortino
- Weyman Thompson as Roy
- Mario Van Peebles as Winston
- Leon Russom as Coach
- Penelope Ann Miller as Mary
- Rutanya Alda as Georgia Kristidis

== Reception ==
The movie received a modest reception from critics.

== See also ==
- List of association football films
