= Mykelti Williamson =

American actor (born 1957)

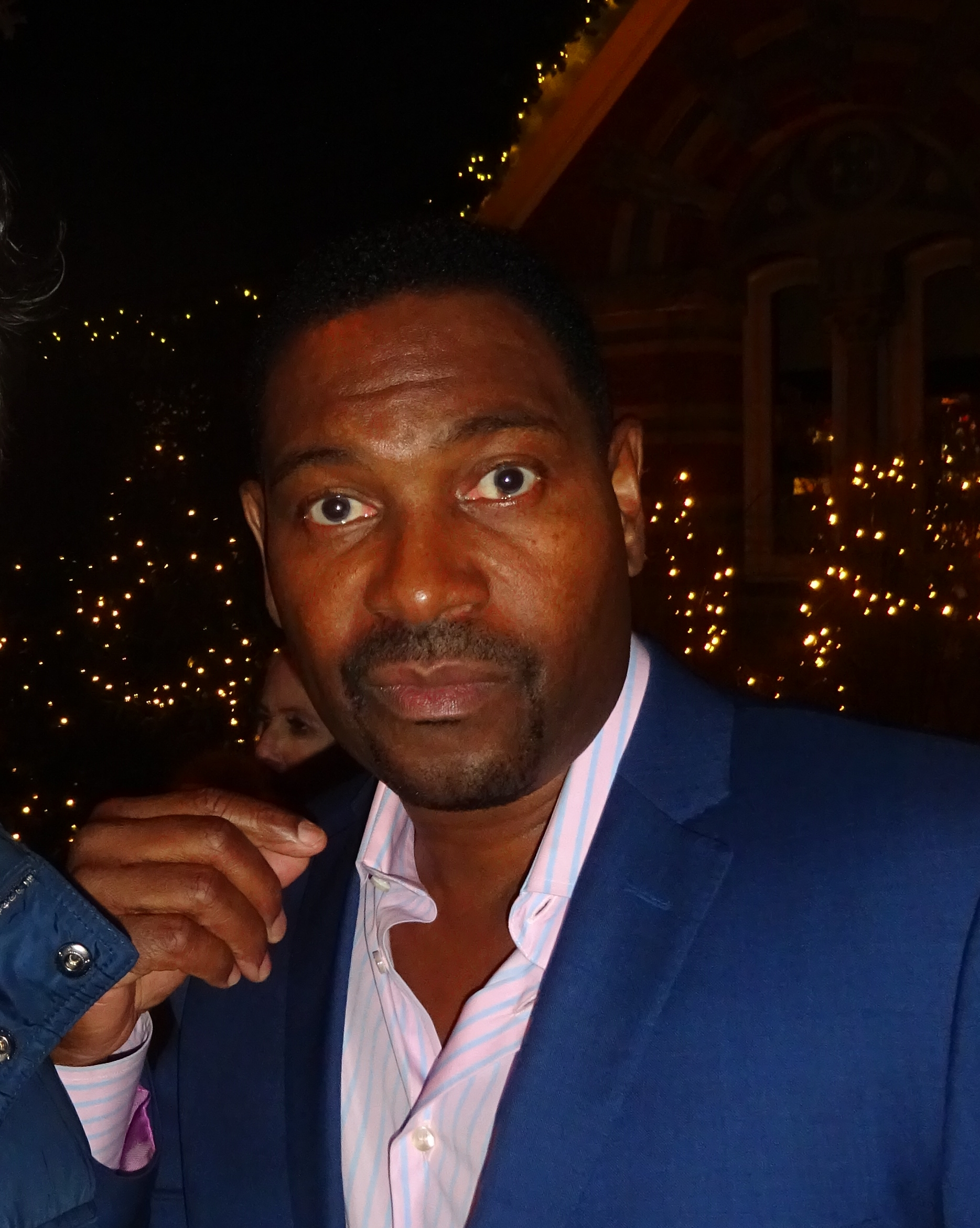
- Williamson in 2016
- Born: Michael T. Williamson; March 4, 1957 (age 69); St. Louis, Missouri, U.S.
- Other name: Mykel T. Williamson
- Occupations: Actor, director, writer
- Years active: 1978–present
- Spouses: Olivia Brown (m. 1983; div. 1985) Cheryl Chisholm (m. 1989; div. 1991) Sondra Spriggs (m. 1997)
- Children: 3

Mykelti Williamson (/ˈmaɪkəlti/; born Michael T. Williamson; March 4, 1957) is an American actor and director best known for his roles in the films Forrest Gump, 12 Angry Men (1997), Con Air, and Ali, and the television shows Boomtown, 24, and Justified. In 2016, he portrayed Gabriel Maxson in Denzel Washington's acclaimed film adaptation of August Wilson's play Fences, reprising his role from the 2010 Broadway revival.

Williamson's other notable roles include Wildcats, Miracle Mile, The First Power, Free Willy, Heat, Lucky Number Slevin, Three Kings, August Rush, Black Dynamite, The Final Destination, ATL, Species II, Hollows Grove, and The Purge: Election Year.

== Early life and education ==
Mykelti Williamson was born in St. Louis, Missouri. He is the son of Elaine, a certified public accountant, and a father who was an Air Force Non-Commissioned Officer. He is of African American descent and has stated he has Blackfoot ancestry.

Williamson began performing at the age of nine. Along with acting, he also danced as an alternate member of The Lockers troupe on Soul Train along with Fred Berry (star of TV sitcom What's Happening!!). At age nine, Williamson relocated to Los Angeles with his family. He studied television and film at Los Angeles City College. He audited acting classes at USC under the tutelage of Dr. Frank X. Ford Williamson, and later transferred to Gene Evans Motion Picture School in San Jose, earning his certificate in Cinematography/Film Production.

== Career ==
Williamson began acting professionally as a child. His first TV appearances include Starsky & Hutch, Father Murphy, Hill Street Blues, Miami Vice, China Beach, and Midnight Caller. Perhaps his best-known television role was as program director Donovan Aderhold in the syndicated series The New WKRP in Cincinnati. Williamson also starred in PBS's TV series The Righteous Apples. The show focuses on the activities of The Righteous Apples, five Boston-area high school musicians, who in a troubled world, seek to help people in distress. Williamson played Charles "Big Neck" McMorris, the lead singer of the group in the show in which he was just a teenager at that time.

One of Williamson's first film appearances was in Streets of Fire (1984). His credits include Wildcats (1986) with Goldie Hawn, Miracle Mile (1989), The First Power (1990) with Lou Diamond Phillips, Free Willy (1993), Forrest Gump (1994) with Tom Hanks, Waiting to Exhale (1995), Free Willy 2: The Adventure Home (1995) Heat (1995), Soul of the Game (1996) with Delroy Lindo, Con Air (1997), Truth or Consequences, N.M. (1997), William Friedkin's TV version of 12 Angry Men (1997), Three Kings (1999), Having Our Say: The Delany Sisters' First 100 Years (1999), Holiday Heart (2000), Black Dynamite (2009), The Final Destination (2009), and The Purge: Election Year (2016). Williamson is best known as Private Benjamin Buford "Bubba" Blue in the Academy Award–winning 1994 film Forrest Gump. He would also more than once play the role of social worker Dwight Mercer in the Free Willy franchise. He also received favorable reviews when he played Negro league baseball player Josh Gibson in the HBO film Soul of the Game (1996).

Williamson has made many guest appearances in TV and film. His most recent film appearances have included Ali (2001),The Assassination of Richard Nixon (2004), Get Rich or Die Tryin' (2005), ATL (2006), Lucky Number Slevin (2006), August Rush (2007), High School (2010), Convergence (2015), and Fences (2016). He was Juror #10 in the 1997 TV movie remake of 12 Angry Men (picking up the Ed Begley role from the 1957 film). He also appeared in a short-lived TV series remake The Fugitive (CBS, 2000–2001). CBS cancelled the series after one season with a total of 22 episodes.

In 2002, Williamson co-starred as Detective Bobby "Fearless" Smith in the critically acclaimed but commercially unsuccessful crime drama Boomtown. Between 2007 and 2009, he appeared in seven episodes of CSI: NY as Chief Brigham Sinclair, reuniting him with his Forrest Gump co-star Gary Sinise. He was a main character in season 8 of 24 starring as Brian Hastings, the special agent in charge of the New York CTU. He had a recurring role as Ellstin Limehouse on the FX drama Justified. He was also cast as a homeless man named Terry George in the third season of the ABC drama Nashville. Since October 2016, Williamson has had a recurring role as Admiral Chernow in Designated Survivor. In 2017, he began appearing on Chicago P.D..

== Personal life ==
Williamson was married to Miami Vice star Olivia Brown from July 2, 1983 until they divorced in 1985. He later married Cheryl Chisholm in 1989 with whom he had his first child, Phoenix. They divorced in 1991.

Williamson later remarried and has been with Sondra Spriggs since April 26, 1997; together they have two daughters, Nicole and Maya. The two were married during the filming of TNT's production of Buffalo Soldiers.

Williamson was charged with attempted murder in 1998 after he stabbed his ex-wife Cheryl Chisholm's boyfriend. The court reduced the charge to attempted manslaughter and he was found not guilty by jury, claiming he used the knife in self-defense after the boyfriend attacked him first.

== Filmography ==
=== Film ===
Year	Title	Role	Notes
1979	Sunnyside	Hot Dog	
1984	Streets of Fire	B.J.	as Mykel T. Williamson
1986	Wildcats	Levander 'Bird' Williams	as Mykel T. Williamson
1986	The Delta Force	Delta Force Member	Uncredited extra
1987	Number One with a Bullet	Casey	
1987	You Talkin' to Me?	Thatcher Marks	
1988	Miracle Mile	Wilson	as Mykel T. Williamson
1990	The First Power	Detective Oliver Franklin	as Mykel T. Williamson
1993	Free Willy	Dwight Mercer	
1994	Forrest Gump	Benjamin Buford "Bubba" Blue	
1995	Free Willy 2: The Adventure Home	Dwight Mercer	
1995	How to Make an American Quilt	Winston	
1995	Heat	Sergeant Drucker	
1995	Waiting to Exhale	Troy	
1997	Truth or Consequences, N.M.	Marcus Weans	
1997	Con Air	Baby-O	
1997	Double Tap	Agent Hamilton	
1998	Primary Colors	Dewayne Smith	
1998	Species II	Dennis Gamble	
1998	Gideon	Coleman Walker	
1999	Three Kings	Colonel Horn	
2001	Ali	Don King	
2004	The Assassination of Richard Nixon	Harold Mann	
2004	After the Sunset	Agent Stafford	
2005	Get Rich or Die Tryin'	Charlene's Stepfather	
2006	Lucky Number Slevin	Sloe	
2006	Fatwa	Grady Frank	
2006	ATL	Uncle George Swann	
2007	Spinning into Butter	Aaron Carmichael	
2007	August Rush	Reverend James	
2008	Ball Don't Lie	Dallas	
2008	Vice	Sampson	
2009	Black Dynamite	Chicago Wind	
2009	My Summer Friend	Romell	Short
2009	The Final Destination	George Lanter	
2010	High School	Paranoid	
2014	Hollows Grove	F.B.I. Agent Jones	
2015	Convergence	Captain Miller	
2015	You Bury Your Own	Detective Goodman	
2016	The Purge: Election Year	Joe Dixon	
2016	Fences	Gabriel Maxson	
2018	Run the Race	Coach Hailey	
2018	Canal Street	Jackie Styles	
2018	Saint Judy	Dikembe Mustafa	
2018	Thriller	Detective Raymond Johnson	
2019	Don't Let Go	Bobby Owens	
2020	Butter	Professor Dunn	
2020	Emperor	Truesdale	
2020	The 24th	1st Sgt. Hayes	
2021	Clean	Travis	
2022	North of the 10	Cole Pruit	
2024	Unstoppable	Eddie	
2025	The Last Rodeo	Charlie Williams	
2026	Is God Is	Chuck Hall the Lawyer	
2026	They Fight	TBA	

=== Television ===
Year	Title	Role	Notes
1978	Starsky & Hutch	Bruce	Episode: "Black and Blue" (as Michael T. Williamson)
1978	Salvage 1	Eddie	Episode: "Golden Orbit: Part 1" (as Michael T. Williamson)
1979–1981	The White Shadow	Malcolm Gruner/Fred	2 episodes
1980–1981	The Righteous Apples	Charles "Big Neck" McMorris	Main cast (12 episodes)
1981	Freebie and the Bean	Lemar Washington	Episode: "Highway Robbery"
1981	Father Murphy	Lijah	Episode: "Establish Thou the Works of Our Hands"
1982	Desperate Lives	Jack	TV movie
1983	Alice	Player #1	Episode: "Carrie on the Rebound"
1983	Hill Street Blues	Raymond Hawkins Jr.	Episode: "Moon Over Uranus: The Final Legacy"
1983–1984	Bay City Blues	Deejay Cunningham	Main cast (8 episodes)
1984	Gimme a Break!	Waiter	Episode: "Nell's Birthday"
1984–1985	Cover Up	Rick	20 episodes
1984–1985	Miami Vice	Leon Jefferson/Sylvio Romulus	2 episodes
1984–1986	Hill Street Blues	Officer Ron Garfield	9 episodes
1986	The Love Boat	James Russell	2 episodes
1987	J.J. Starbuck	Calvin	Episode: "First You've Got to Go to the Picnic"
1987–1988	The Bronx Zoo	Gus Butterfield	Main cast (21 episodes)
1988	Police Story: Monster Manor	Officer Don Luntner	TV movie
1988–1991	Midnight Caller	Deacon Bridges	Main cast (47 episodes)
1989	China Beach	Jean Jacques Rousseau	Episode: "Psywars" & "Promised Land"
1990	A Killer Among Us	Greg Hopkins	TV movie
1991–1993	The New WKRP in Cincinnati	Donovan Aderhold	Main cast (46 episodes)
1993	Other Women's Children	Leonard	TV movie
1994	Time Trax	Luther Bell	Episode: "Cool Hand Darien"
1995	The Outer Limits	Dr. Michael Alders	Episode: "The Second Soul"
1996	Soul of the Game	Josh Gibson	TV movie
1997	12 Angry Men	Juror #10	TV movie
1997	Buffalo Soldiers	Cpl. William Christy	TV movie
1999	Having Our Say: The Delany Sisters' First 100 Years	Henry Beard Delany	TV movie
1999–2000	The Hoop Life	Marvin Buxton	Main cast (22 episodes)
2000	Holiday Heart	Silas	TV movie
2000–2001	The Fugitive	Lt. Philip Gerard	Main cast (23 episodes)
2002	Our America	Graham Ellis	TV movie
2002	Touched by an Angel	Tevis Lockwood	Episode: "Ship-in-a-Bottle"
2002–2003	Boomtown	Detective Bobby "Fearless" Smith	Main cast (24 episodes)
2004	The Secret Service	Mike Bradford	TV movie
2004	Monk	Captain Walter Cage	Episode: "Mr. Monk Takes Manhattan"
2005	Third Watch	Detective Dante Rice	2 episodes
2006	Justice	Joshua Mortin	Episode: "Prior Convictions"
2006–2007	Kidnapped	Virgil Hayes	Main cast (13 episodes)
2007	Raines	Detective Bobby "Fearless" Smith	Episode: "Pilot"
2007–2009	CSI: NY	Chief Brigham Sinclair	7 episodes
2008	One Hogan Place	Lt. Dardin	TV short
2009	Psych	Coach Sammy Winslow	Episode: "Any Given Friday Night at 10PM, 9PM Central"
2010	24	Brian Hastings	Main cast (17 episodes)
2010	The Good Wife	Mathew Wade	Episode: "On Tap"
2011	Have a Little Faith	Donnie	TV movie
2011	Rizzoli & Isles	U.S. Marshal Whitmore	Episode: "Don't Stop Dancing, Girl"
2012	Single Ladies	Pierce	Episode: "All or Nothing"
2012–2015	Justified	Ellstin Limehouse	18 episodes
2013	Twist of Faith	Uncle Moe	TV movie
2013	Touch	Detective Lang	4 episodes
2013	Lauren	Prince	Episode: "Episode #2.12"
2014	Scorpion	General Ned Walker	Episode: "Plutonium Is Forever"
2014	Nashville	Terry George	4 episodes
2014	Wild Blue	Master Chief Donald Bowman	TV movie
2014	Clementine	Ray	TV movie
2015–2016	Hawaii Five-0	Clay Maxwell	Episode: "Ike Hanau" & "Umia Ka Hanu"
2016	Criminal Minds: Beyond Borders	Brigadier General Yazee Zwane	Episode: "Iqiniso"
2016	Underground	Moses	6 episodes
2016–2017	Designated Survivor	Admiral Chernow	3 episodes
2017	Rebel	Rene Knight	Main cast (5 episodes)
2017–2018	Chicago P.D.	Lieutenant Denny Woods	14 episodes
2018	Insecure	Preacher	Episode: "Obsessed-Like"
2018–2019	Lethal Weapon	Tom Barnes	4 episodes
2020	Two Degrees	T	Episode: "Cigar Cave"
2021–2022	Law & Order: Organized Crime	Preston Webb	9 episodes
2022	The Holiday Stocking	Robert	TV movie
2024	Fallout	Honcho	Episode: "The End"
2025	Government Cheese	Gus	Episode: "The Gospel of Kenny Sharp"
