= Fast Food (1989 film) =

- Directed by: Michael A. Simpson
- Written by: Clark Brandon; Lanny Horn; Scott B. Sowers; Jim Basile
- Produced by: Jerry Silva; Michael A. Simpson; Stan Wakefield; Phil Walden
- Starring: Clark Brandon; Tracy Griffith; Randal Patrick; Traci Lords; Pamela Springsteen; Michael J. Pollard; Jim Varney; Blake Clark
- Cinematography: Bill Mills
- Edited by: John David Allen
- Music by: Iris Gillon
- Production company: Double Helix Films
- Distributed by: Fries Entertainment
- Release date: April 28, 1989
- Running time: 90 minutes
- Country: United States
- Language: English

Fast Food is a 1989 American low budget comedy film starring Clark Brandon, Tracy Griffith, Jim Varney, Traci Lords, Michael J. Pollard, Blake Clark and Pamela Springsteen.

== Plot ==
Auggie Hamilton (Clark Brandon) is always looking for ways to earn a quick buck. When he learns that his friend Samantha Brooks (Tracy Griffith) is going to sell her garage to fast food king Wrangler Bob Bundy (Jim Varney) he comes up with one more scheme, to turn the garage into a burger joint. When Wrangler Bob proves to be stiff competition, they develop a secret sauce that makes people go crazy.

It was shot in Atlanta and Los Angeles.

== Cast ==
- Clark Brandon as Auggie Hamilton
- Randal Patrick as Drew Taylor
- Tracy Griffith as Samantha Brooks
- Michael J. Pollard as Bud
- Lanny Horn as Calvin
- Jim Varney as Bob Bundy
- Blake Clark as E.G. McCormick
- Traci Lords as Dixie Love
- Pamela Springsteen as Mary Beth Bensen
- Randi Layne as Alexandra Lowell
- Kevin McCarthy as Judge Reinholte
- J. Don Ferguson as Dean Witler
- Terry Hobbs as Donald Frump III
- Amy Bryson as Sheryl
- Kathleen Webster as Wendy
- Julie Ridley as Dr. Duran
- Paige Conner as Tracy
- Tom Key as Jack Skinner
