= Skeeter (film) =

- DVD cover
- Directed by: Clark Brandon
- Written by: Clark Brandon (writer); Lanny Horn (writer); Joseph Luis Rubin (original screenplay)
- Produced by: James Glenn Dudelson; John Lambert; Kelly Andrea Rubin; Don Edmonds; Sanford Hampton
- Starring: Jim Youngs; Tracy Griffith
- Edited by: Ed Hansen
- Music by: David Lawrence
- Production companies: August Entertainment; K.A.R. Films; Team Players Productions
- Distributed by: New Line Cinema
- Release date: 1993
- Running time: 95 minutes
- Country: United States
- Language: English

Skeeter is a 1993 horror film starring Jim Youngs and Tracy Griffith and directed by Clark Brandon. The film was released in 1993, with the first video premiere being on April 6, 1994. It was panned by critics.

The film was released on DVD as a stand-alone in the United States by Image Entertainment. It was also released in 2007 on DVD as the first film in the triple feature with the 1982 low-budget British science-fiction horror movie Xtro and its 1990 sequel Xtro II: The Second Encounter.

== Plot ==
Drake is a corrupt and greedy developer who is illegally dumping toxic waste into the mines around the small town of Clear Sky, causing mosquitoes to mutate into giant beasts that attack and kill anything, including humans. A lawman of the town sheriff, Roy Boone, and his reunited love Sarah Crosby, must put a stop to both the pollution and the bugs. The body counts keep rising, which causes the locals to feel that they have to move out of the city. Crosby and environmental inspector Gordon Perry try to find the origin of the waste, but certain people try to prevent them for doing so due to Drake's evil deeds, which involves some hitmen.

== Cast ==
- Jim Youngs as Roy Boone
- Tracy Griffith as Sarah Crosby
- Charles Napier as Ernie Buckle
- Jay Robinson as Drake
- William Sanderson as Gordon Perry
- Michael J. Pollard as Hopper
- Eloy Casados as Hank Tucker
- John Putch as Hamilton
- Saxon Trainor as Dr. Jill Wyle
- Stacy Edwards as Mary Ann
- John F. Goff as Clay Crosby
- George 'Buck' Flower as Filo
- Eric Lawson as Frank O'Connell
- Lindsay Fisher as Chrissy O'Connell
- Barbara Baldavin as Dorothy O'Connell
- Larry Stevens as Trevor O'Connell
- Michael D'Agosta as Bo
- Joe McCutcheon as Wil
- Jane Abbott as Esther
- Robert Snively as Luther
- Mia St. John as Charlie
- John Ingle as The Preacher

== Reception ==
Skeeter was largely panned by critics. AllMovie gave the film two and a half stars out of five and wrote "Part of the same "third wave" of eco-kill horror films which spawned the superior Ticks, Aberration, and Spiders, this giant mosquito film is similarly hamstrung by too much plot about environmental crime and not enough scares." The site summed up the film saying, "The concept of giant blood-sucking insects certainly has the potential to give viewers the screaming meemies, but time and again the potential is undercut by pious environmental speeches and pointless subplots more suitable to a frontier Western than a horror film. The best films in the eco-kill subgenre use nature's revenge as subtext, but Brandon pushes it full-tilt into the foreground and the result is a real bore."

Billboard reviewed the film in March 1994 as part of the "Marquee Values" section, created as a guide to the lesser-known rental-priced films of the time, saying, "While taking baby steps toward humor, this mightily confused fright flick should have gone for Tremors-like laughs and upped its special effects budget. (It might also have taken an interest in its obligatory evil land-developer subplot and dropped the romantic subplot that stops the movie dead. It should draw out the SF mavens, who probably will remain indifferent to the film's periodic skeeter-cam shots."

Both Emanuel Levy and Rob Vaux of Flipside Movie Emporium gave the film two out of five stars; Scott Weinberg of eFilmCritic.com gave the film three out of five stars. TV Guide (Triangle Publications) gave the film one out of five stars.
