= Lara Harris =

American model and actress

- Born: Chicago, Illinois
- Occupations: Model; Actress

Lara Harris (Note: Asked by Andrea Seabrook in an interview for NPR News how old she was, Harris refused to say, answering: "I think it's important to keep secrets. ...") is an American model and actress.

Harris studied French in Paris and began her career there as a model. She was the face of Armani fragrance Gio, appearing in their TV commercial directed by David Lynch, and also of Ultima II for Revlon, Banana Republic, and Oil of Olay. Harris returned to the United States to continue her studies at The New School in New York City, and soon changed from literature to acting. She was featured in national advertisements, including Herb Ritts' commercial Pasha for Cartier in 1994.

Harris is known for film appearances in No Man's Land, The Fourth War, The Fisher King, Singles, Demolition Man and All Tied Up. She has also started directing, writing and producing films, and won "Best Short Film" at the 1997 Aspen Comedy Festival for her first film, 9 1/2 Minutes.

Harris continued her studies with a graduate course in psychology and is a psychotherapist in addition to acting and modeling.

== Filmography ==
Lara Harris' film appearances and roles
Year	Title	Role	Notes
1985	The Falcon and the Snowman		
1987	Mannequin	Mannequin in photo window	
1987	No Man's Land	Ann Varrick	
1989	Blood Red	Angelica	
1990	The Fourth War	Elena Novotna	
1991	Too Much Sun	Sister Ursula	
1991	The Fisher King	Sondra	
1992	Singles	Poetess (deleted scene)	
1993	Demolition Man	Taco Bell patron	
1994	All Tied Up	Kim	
1995	The Zone also released as The Dogfighters	Mikaela/Mike	
1996	Circuit Breaker	Katrina Carver	Released for cable
1996	Mercenary	Joanna Ambler	
1999	The Confession	Meg Renoble	
1999	I'll Take You There	Rose	
2003	April's Shower	Kelly	
2006	Trapped Ashes	Julia	story segment "Wraparound"

== Television appearances ==
Lara Harris' television appearances and roles
Year	Title	Role	Notes
1985	Ryan's Hope		1 episode
1986	The Equalizer	Blond on Phone	Episode: "No Conscience"
1986	The Equalizer	Woman in phone booth (uncredited)	Episode: "Pretenders"
1988	Monsters	Debbie Curzon	Episode: "The Legacy"
1994	Friends	Obsession girl	Episode: "The One Where Underdog Gets Away"
2000	Arli$$		1 episode
2000	ER	Regina Morgan	Episode: "Sand and Water"
2002	The Agency	Greta	Episode: "Air Lex"
2009	Law & Order	Susan Grayson	Episode: "Pledge"
2012	American Horror Story	Rhonda Lancaster	Episode: "Unholy Night"
2013	The Young and the Restless	Model Agent (uncredited)	Episode: #1.10195 (TV Episode 2013)

== Awards ==
- "Best Short Film", Aspen Comedy Festival for 9 1/2 Minutes.
