= Rex Ryon =

American film and television actor

- Ryon in Beverly Hills Cop, 1984
- Born: Rex Garner Yon; April 5, 1953; Atlanta, Georgia, U.S.
- Died: April 19, 2005 (aged 52); Los Angeles, California, U.S.
- Education: Vanderbilt University; University of Houston
- Occupations: Film and television actor

Rex Garner Yon (April 5, 1953 – April 19, 2005) was an American film and television actor.

== Life and career ==
Ryon was born in Atlanta, Georgia. He attended Baylor School, graduating in 1971. After graduating, he attended Vanderbilt University, and appeared in community theatres in Chattanooga, Tennessee and Nashville, Tennessee. He also attended the University of Houston. He began his screen career in 1980, appearing in the ABC comedy drama television series Breaking Away, and in 1981, he appeared in the ABC superhero television series The Greatest American Hero.

Later in his career, Ryon guest-starred in numerous television programs including Cheers, The Fall Guy, Remington Steele, Matlock, Mama's Family, Scarecrow and Mrs. King, The A-Team, Matt Houston, Empty Nest and Crusade. He also appeared in films such as Jack's Back (as Jack Pendler), Beverly Hills Cop, You Talkin' to Me?, American Samurai, P.I. Private Investigations, Blue City and The Man in the Iron Mask.

Ryon retired from acting in 2002, last appearing in the film Malevolent.

== Death ==
Ryon died on April 19, 2005, at his home in Los Angeles, California, at the age of 52.
