= Clark Brandon =

American actor (born 1958)

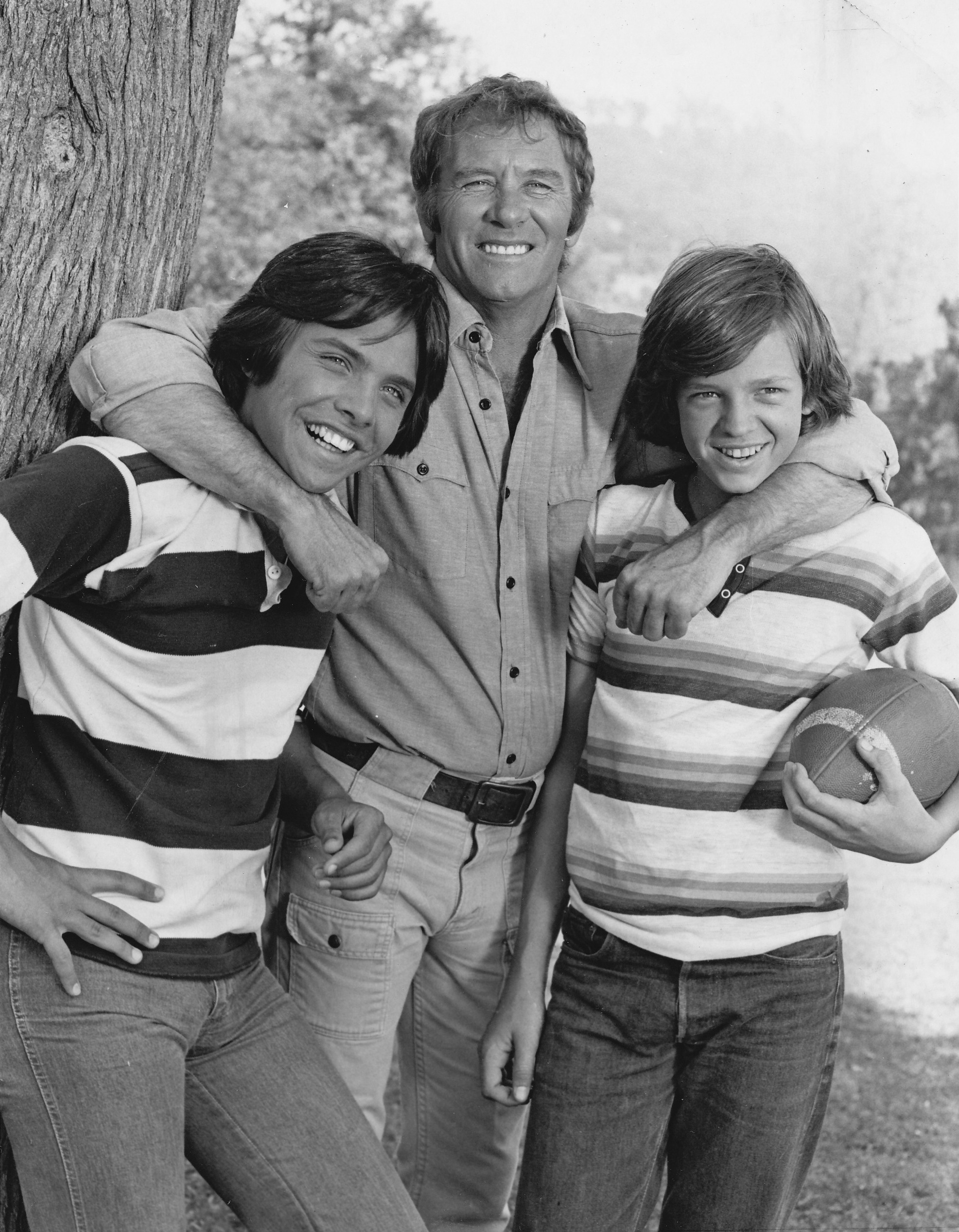
- Clark Brandon (left) with The Fitzpatricks co-stars Bert Kramer and Jimmy McNichol
- Born: December 13, 1958 (age 67); New York City, New York United States
- Occupations: Actor; director; screenwriter
- Years active: 1977–1989 (actor); 1992–1997 (director)

Clark Brandon (born December 13, 1958) is an American actor. His most notable roles were as Max Merlin's apprentice Zachary Rogers in the CBS series Mr. Merlin, as Chris Richards on ABC's "Out of the Blue," and as Sean Fitzpatrick, the older brother, in the CBS series The Fitzpatricks. He also starred with Jim Varney in the 1989 comedy film Fast Food.

Brandon also directed three films: Dark Secrets (1992), Skeeter (1993) and The Last Road (1997).

Until 2018, he was dean of students at Areté Preparatory Academy in Southern California.

== Filmography ==
=== Actor ===
Year	Title	Role	Notes
1977	The Chicken Chronicles	Lee	
1977–1978	The Fitzpatricks	Sean Fitzpatrick	Main cast (13 episodes)
1978	Family	Roger Arnold	Episode: "And Baby Makes Three"
1978	Fantasy Island	Patrick Kincaid	Episode: "The Racer"
1978	ABC Afterschool Special	Mark Henderson	Episode: "It Isn't Easy Being a Teenage Millionaire"
1978	Like Mom, Like Me	Kevin	TV movie
1979	Insight	Brad	Episode: "When, Jenny? When?"
1979	The New Adventures of Wonder Woman	Skip	Episode: "The Boy Who Knew Her Secret" (Parts 1 & 2)
1979	Out of the Blue	Chris Richards	Main cast (12 episodes)
1980	Hello, Larry	Mike	Episode: "The Blind Friend"
1980	Serial	Spenser	
1981–1984	The Facts of Life	Eddie Brennan	Recurring role (4 episodes)
1981–1982	Mr. Merlin	Zachary Rogers	Main cast (22 episodes)
1982	In Love with an Older Woman	Chip	TV movie
1983	My Tutor	Billy	
1983	The Love Boat	Jerry Howard	Episode: "Dee Dee's Dilemma"
1987	Funland	Doug Sutterfield	
1989	Fast Food	Auggie Hamilton	

=== Director ===
Year	Title	Studio
1992	Dark Secrets	e-m-s The DVD-Company
1993	Skeeter	New Line Cinema
1997	The Last Road	Leo Films
