= Mr. Merlin =

- Mr. Merlin title card
- Genre: Sitcom; Fantasy
- Created by: Larry Rosen; Larry Tucker
- Written by: Larry Rosen; Larry Tucker; Tom Chehak
- Directed by: Bill Bixby; Harry Winer; James Frawley
- Starring: Barnard Hughes; Clark Brandon; Elaine Joyce; Jonathan Prince; Phil Morris
- Composer: Ken Harrison
- Country of origin: United States
- Original language: English
- No. of seasons: 1
- No. of episodes: 22

Production
- Executive producers: Larry Rosen; Larry Tucker
- Producer: Joel Rogosin
- Cinematography: Chuck Arnold; Ronald W. Browne
- Editors: Robert F. Shugrue; John Farrell; Kenneth R. Koch
- Running time: 30 minutes
- Production company: Larry Larry Productions Columbia Pictures Television

Original release
- Network: CBS
- Release: October 7, 1981 – March 22, 1982

Mr. Merlin is an American sitcom that ran for one season, from 1981 to 1982, about Merlin the wizard (played by Barnard Hughes), who is immortal, living in modern-day San Francisco, and disguised as Max Merlin, a mechanic. Mr. Merlin was produced by Larry Rosen and Larry Tucker, working as the Larry Larry Company, in association with Columbia Pictures Television. The series aired on CBS from October 7, 1981, to March 22, 1982, for a total of 22 episodes. Also starring Clark Brandon as teenager Zachary Rodgers, the show followed Merlin as he reluctantly takes on a new apprentice after Zac pulls a crowbar from a block of concrete, an act that parallels the legend of Excalibur.

== Premise ==
Merlin hires Zachary Rogers (Clark Brandon) to work in his garage, and when Zac pulls a crowbar out of a bucket of cement, the crowbar is revealed to be Arthur's sword Excalibur and Merlin must reveal himself to Zac and make him an apprentice. Leo Samuels (Jonathan Prince) is Zac's best friend, who naturally has no idea his best buddy is a "wizard in training". Elaine Joyce is Alexandria ("Alex"), Max's equally magical liaison with an unseen "council" (who insisted Merlin take on an apprentice or lose both his powers and immortality).

== Cast ==
=== Main ===
- Barnard Hughes as Max Merlin, Merlin the Magician who now works as a mechanic in San Francisco.
- Clark Brandon as Zachary Rogers, Merlin's apprentice.
- Jonathan Prince as Leo Samuels, Zac's best friend.
- Elaine Joyce as Alexandria, Merlin's fellow magician.
- Phil Morris as the Kid.

=== Guest cast ===
- DeAnna Robbins in "Pilot" (Episode 1)
- Richard Basehart in "A Moment in Camelot" (Episode 7)
- Stacy Keach Sr. in "Take My Tonsils... Please!" (Episode 9)
- Scott McGinnis in "Not So Sweet Sixteen" (Episode 11)
- Mel Stewart in "Alex Goes Popless" (Episode 14)
- Catherine Mary Stewart and Rita Wilson in "Everything's Coming Up Daisies " (Episode 15)
- Eugene Roche in "Change of Venue: Part 1" (Episode 18)
- Holly Gagnier in "I Was a Teenage Loser" (Episode 22)

== Episodes ==
Note: A Mr. Merlin strip ran briefly in the British TV Comic.

No.	Title	Directed by	Written by	Original release date	Prod. code
1	"Pilot"	John Astin	Larry Tucker, Larry Rosen	October 7, 1981	183400
2	"The Cloning of the Green"	Bill Bixby	Larry Tucker, Larry Rosen	October 14, 1981	183404
3	"Starsand"	Herbert Kenwith	Larry Tucker, Larry Rosen	October 21, 1981	183405
4	"The Music's in Me"	Harry Winer	Tom Chehak	October 28, 1981	183402
5	"All About Sheila"	Harry Winer	Larry Tucker, Larry Rosen	November 4, 1981	183401
6	"The Two Faces of Zac"	Bill Bixby	Tim Maschler	November 11, 1981	183403
7	"A Moment in Camelot"	Harry Winer	William J. Keenan	November 18, 1981	183407
8	"A Message from Wallshime"	Alan Myerson	Jeffrey Scott	December 2, 1981	183408
9	"Take My Tonsils... Please"	Bill Bixby	Parke Perine	December 9, 1981	183409
10	"The Ache"	Larry Elikann	Stephanie Garman, Hollace White	December 23, 1981	183410
11	"Not So Sweet Sixteen"	Alan Myerson	Tom Chehak	December 30, 1981	183411
12	"Romeo and Dreidelwood"	James Frawley	Larry Tucker, Larry Rosen	January 6, 1982	183419
13	"Getting to Know You"	Leo Penn	Ann Woodall, Paula Lintz	January 18, 1982	183412
14	"Alex Goes Popless"	James Frawley	Tom Chehak	January 25, 1982	183420
15	"Everything's Coming Up Daisies"	Jeffrey Hayden	Don Tait	February 1, 1982	183421
16	"The Egg and Us"	Howard Storm	George Geiger	February 8, 1982	183417
17	"How to Help a Gymnast in a Foreign Country"	Leo Penn	Martin Donovan	February 15, 1982	183416
18–19	"Change of Venue: Parts 1 & 2"	Bill Bixby	Tim Maschler	February 22, 1982	183414 183415
Originally presented as an hour-long episode.
20	"An Absence of Amulets"	Harry Winer	Paul Haggis, Michael Mauer	March 1, 1982	183413
21	"Arrivederci, Dink"	Alan Myerson	Julie Kirgo, Dinah Kirgo	March 15, 1982	183424
22	"I Was a Teenage Loser"	Bill Bixby	Tom Chehak	March 22, 1982	183425
