= Jim Youngs =

American actor (born 1956)

- Born: October 13, 1956 (age 69); Old Bethpage, New York, U.S.
- Occupation: Actor
- Relatives: John Savage (brother); Robin Young (sister)

Jim Youngs (born October 13, 1956) is an American actor.

== Early life ==
Youngs was born in Old Bethpage, New York, the brother of actor John Savage and journalist Robin Young.

== Career ==
He appeared in such films as The Wanderers (1979), Footloose (1984), Out of Control (1985), Youngblood (1986), The Price of Life (1987), Hotshot (1986), Nobody's Fool (1986), You Talkin' to Me? (1987) and Skeeter (1993).

In 1990, he portrayed Michael Santana's cop brother-in-law Richard Burns in Wiseguy season 4 episode "Point of No Return". In 1994, he portrayed Benson in Babylon 5 episode "And the Sky Full of Stars". In 2012, Youngs was mentioned in speculative reporting that he would reunite with Tony Ganios, his co-star in The Wanderers, in a teen-sex comedy to be called Daddies' Girls. Ganios and his Porky's co-stars launched a Kickstarter campaign in an effort to produce the film.

== Filmography ==
=== Film ===
Year	Title	Role	Notes
1979	The Wanderers	Buddy	
1983	The Final Terror	Jim	
1984	Footloose	Chuck Cranston	
1984	Out of Control	Cowboy	
1986	Youngblood	Kelly Youngblood	
1986	Nobody's Fool	Billy	
1986	Hotshot	Jimmy Kristidis	
1987	The Price of Life	Zachary	
1987	You Talkin' to Me?	Bronson Green	
1988	Keys to Freedom	Zach Mitchum	
1993	Skeeter	Roy Boone	
1993	Cyborg 2	Pinwheel Exec #1	
1995	The Dangerous	Henry Lautrec	Uncredited

=== Television ===
Year	Title	Role	Notes
1980–1981	Secrets of Midland Heights	John Grey	11 episodes
1981	Splendor in the Grass	Alan 'Toots' Tuttle	Television film
1982	The Executioner's Song	Sterling Baker	Television film
1987	Roses Are for the Rich	Lonnie Norton	Television film
1987	Private Eye	Billy Ray	Episode: "Blue Hotel Pt.1"
1990	Wiseguy	Richie Burns / Jimmy	2 episodes
1991	American Playhouse	Zachary	Episode: "Triple Play II"
1992	Silk Stalkings	Johnny Rider	Episode: "In Too Deep"
1994	Babylon 5	Frank Benson	Episode: "And the Sky Full of Stars"
1995	NYPD Blue	Det. Mulligan	Episode: "Large Mouth Bass"
