= You Talkin' to Me? (film) =

1987 film by Charles Winkler

- Film poster
- Directed by: Charles Winkler
- Written by: Charles Winkler
- Produced by: Michael Polaire
- Starring: Jim Youngs
- Cinematography: Paul Ryan
- Edited by: David Handman
- Music by: Joel McNeely
- Distributed by: United Artists
- Release date: September 25, 1987 (New York City)
- Running time: 97 minutes
- Country: United States
- Language: English

You Talkin' to Me? is a 1987 American comedy film written and directed by Charles Winkler and starring Jim Youngs.

== Plot ==
Bronson Green is a struggling New York actor obsessed with Robert De Niro, particularly his performance as Travis Bickle in Taxi Driver. He watches the film repeatedly in revival theaters and wears a jacket stenciled with "Bickle". After continuous rejection in New York, Bronson moves to Hollywood with his best friend Thatcher Marks, an aspiring Black model.

While Thatcher finds success appearing in milk advertisements, Bronson faces rejection from casting directors who dismiss him as "too New York" and ethnically unsuitable for contemporary Hollywood roles. He supports himself by driving a taxi. After watching a blonde actor effortlessly win a role meant for him, Bronson bleaches his hair and adopts a laid-back California persona.

His transformation attracts Dana Archer, a wealthy socialite who witnesses Bronson thwart a robbery at a surf shop. Her father, Peter Archer, produces right-wing religious television programming. Impressed by Bronson's heroics, Archer hires him as a spokesman for his shows, which promote white supremacist ideology. Despite Archer's racist views, including chasing a Black couple from his property while shouting slurs, Bronson accepts the position for fame and money.

As Bronson's involvement deepens, he films racist public service announcements despite his friendship with Thatcher. When Archer discovers Thatcher's milk billboard, he sends neo-Nazi associates to assault Thatcher, pouring white paint on him and vandalizing his home with "THE WHITE TRUTH". Bronson must choose between his newfound success and his values, ultimately intervening to save his friend.

== Cast ==
- Jim Youngs as Bronson Green
- James Noble as Peter Archer
- Mykelti Williamson as Thatcher Marks
- Faith Ford as Dana Archer
- Bess Motta as Judith Margolis
- Rex Ryon as Kevin
- Brian Thompson as James
- Alan King as himself

== Production ==
You Talkin' to Me? marked the directorial debut of Charles Winkler, son of producer Irwin Winkler. The film was produced independently for less than $1 million, with financing raised by Winkler and producer Michael Polaire without assistance from Winkler's father. The production used downtown Los Angeles locations to stand in for New York City scenes.

== Release ==
The film premiered at the Montreal World Film Festival and the Deauville American Film Festival, where it received favorable notices. MGM/UA planned a national theatrical release, but canceled it following negative reviews during a brief New York City run which began on September 25, 1987.

== Reception ==
John Marriott of Radio Times gave the film three stars out of five. Variety called Youngs' performance "winsome" and "self-assured", noting his resemblance to Christopher Walken. The review praised the film as a "combative cautionary satire" about Hollywood's corruption of values, though it criticized the screenplay's "obviousness" and "clichéd milieu". The reviewer suggested that aggressive promotion emphasizing the film's independent origins could help its commercial prospects in major cities.

A retrospective review in Destroy All Movies!!! (2010) was highly critical, calling it "the most anemic, uneven vengeance movie of the decade" and "a poor, poor, poor man's Play It Again, Sam."
