= Comes a Day =

Three-act play by Speed Lamkin

- Original language: English
- Written by: Speed Lamkin
- Genre: Drama

Premiere
- Date: 1958
- Place: Ambassador Theatre, New York City

Comes a Day is a three-act play written by American playwright Speed Lamkin. The drama is based on Lamkin's short story of the same name, which won a 1950 O. Henry Award.

== Premiere and cast ==
The play was performed on Broadway, at the Ambassador Theatre from 6–29 November 1958. A pre-Broadway run was performed at the McCarter Theatre (Princeton, N.J.), Forrest Theatre (Philadelphia), and the Colonial Theatre (Boston).

- Judith Anderson Isabel Lawton
- Joseph Barr Lewis
- Brandon de Wilde C. D. Lawton
- John Dutra Bud
- Larry Hagman Jim Culpepper
- Ruth Hammond Katherine Eubanks
- Arthur O'Connell Charley Lawton
- Michael J. Pollard Joe Glover
- Eileen Ryan Lorraine
- George C. Scott Tydings Glenn
- Lorna Thayer Mrs. McCarthy
- Diana van der Vlis Caroline Lawton
- Charles White Gordie Eubanks

== Awards and nominations ==
=== Original Broadway production ===
Year	Award	Category	Nominee	Result
1959	Tony Award	Best Featured Actor in a Play	George C. Scott	Nominated
