= The Deadly Trackers =

1973 film by Barry Shear

- VHS cover
- Directed by: Barry Shear
- Written by: Lukas Heller
- Based on: Riata by Samuel Fuller
- Starring: Richard Harris; Rod Taylor; Al Lettieri; Neville Brand; William Smith
- Cinematography: Gabriel Torres
- Edited by: Michael Economou; Carl Pingitore
- Music by: Fred Steiner
- Distributed by: Warner Bros.
- Release date: December 21, 1973
- Running time: 110 minutes
- Country: United States
- Language: English

The Deadly Trackers is a 1973 American Western film directed by Barry Shear and starring Richard Harris, Rod Taylor and Al Lettieri. It is based on the novel Riata by Samuel Fuller.

== Plot ==
Sheriff Sean Kilpatrick is a pacifist. He is compelled to go against everything he has stood for to bring death to a gang of outlaws, led by the ruthless Frank Brand, to avenge the deaths of his wife and son, murdered by the gang when it robbed the bank in Kilpatrick's town. In Mexico, his hunt is challenged by his noble sheriff counterpart, Gutierrez, who is interested only in carrying out the law - not vengeance.

== Cast ==
- Richard Harris as Sheriff Sean Kilpatrick
- Rod Taylor as Frank Brand
- Al Lettieri as Gutierrez, Mexican Policeman
- Neville Brand as Choo Choo
- William Smith as Schoolboy
- Paul Benjamin as Jacob
- Pedro Armendáriz Jr. as Herrero
- Isela Vega as Maria
- Kelly Jean Peters as Katharine Kilpatrick
- William Bryant as Deputy Bill
- Sean Marshall as Kevin Kilpatrick
- Read Morgan as Deputy Bob
- Joan Swift as Teacher
- Ray Moyer as Priest
- Armando Acosta as Mole

== Production ==
The film began production as Riata, written and directed by Sam Fuller, based on his novel and starring Richard Harris and Bo Hopkins. Production was halted during filming and then reassembled with a new director and cast, with Harris the only member of the original cast to return.

According to costar Rod Taylor, Harris hated Fuller's script and walked out on the original production. Once Taylor signed on, he contributed to the re-write (Taylor was a member of the Screenwriters Guild) by adding scenes to flesh out his villainous character. It was through Harris' relentless drive that the film was completed at all, even using musical outtakes from other movies to cobble together the score.
