= Bert Kramer =

American actor

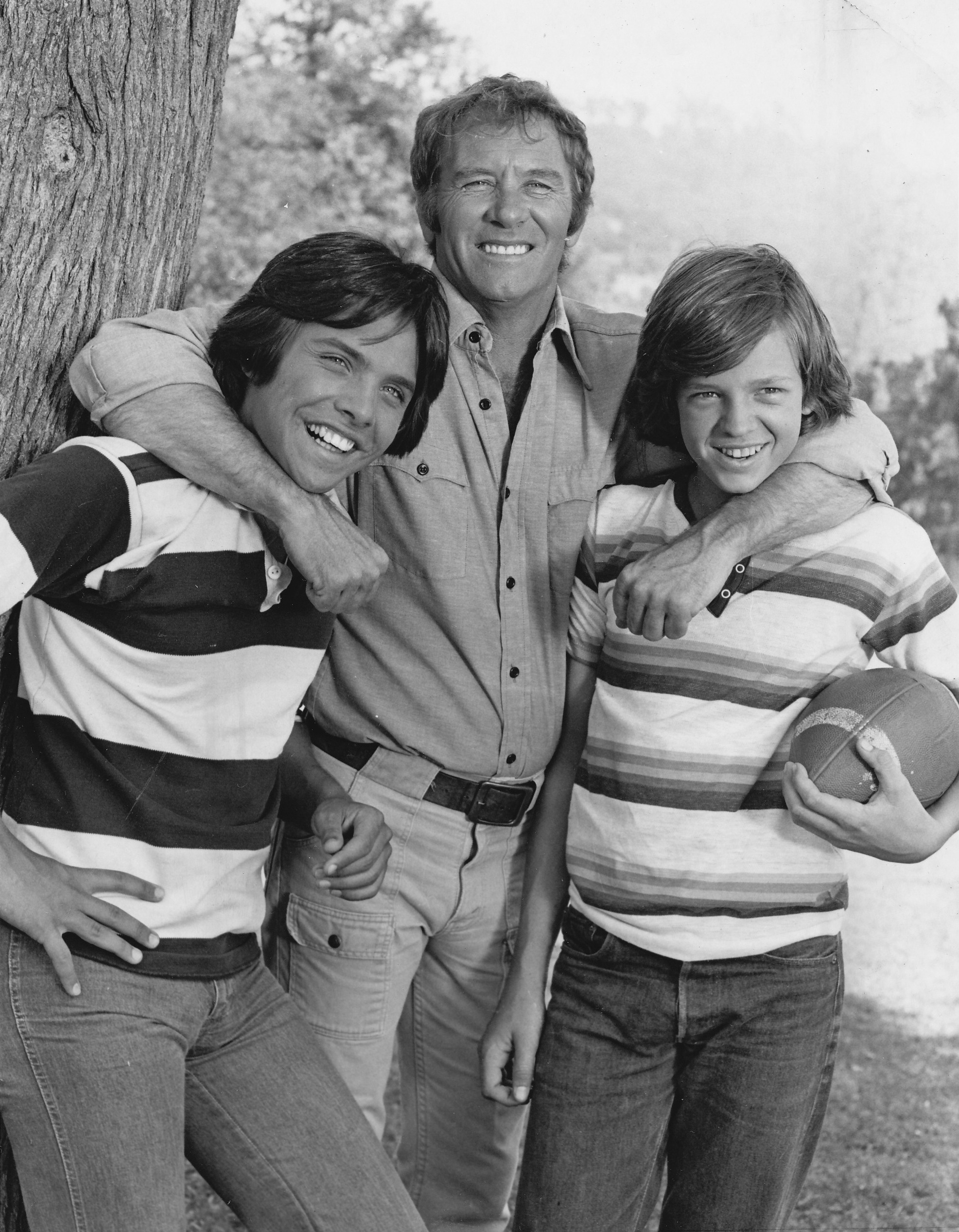
- Bert Kramer (center) with The Fitzpatricks co-stars Clark Brandon and Jimmy McNichol
- Born: October 10, 1934; San Diego, California
- Died: June 20, 2001 (aged 66); Los Angeles, California
- Resting place: Forest Lawn Memorial Park (Glendale, California)
- Occupation: Actor
- Years active: 1966–2001

Bert Kramer (October 10, 1934 – June 20, 2001) was an American actor, who was born in San Diego. He appeared in many television shows including Kojak, The Bionic Woman, The Rockford Files, Dallas, Dynasty, Full House, M*A*S*H, and Matlock.

He is probably best known for playing Alex Wheeler on the soap opera Texas, a role he played from 1980 to 1981. He also portrayed the same character on Texas's parent show Another World for a short time in 1980.

Prior to his role of Alex Wheeler, he played blue-collar patriarch, Mike Fitzpatrick on the 1977 short-lived drama series, The Fitzpatricks, which also starred Clark Brandon, Jimmy McNichol and Helen Hunt. From 1984 to 1985, he played the role of Brent Davis on The Young and the Restless.

In 1986, he starred in a Garry Marshall financed teleplay called Four Stars, alongside actress Julie Paris. The film was directed by Happy Days actress and talent manager Lynda Goodfriend. During this period, he made a number of national television commercials, including a "Good to the Last Drop" Maxwell House spot. He voiced a goblin in the film Little Nemo: Adventures in Slumberland in 1992.

== Death ==
Kramer died of melanoma in Los Angeles on June 20, 2001, at the age of 66.

== Filmography ==
Year	Title	Role	Notes
1972	Lady Sings the Blues	The Policeman	
1974	Earthquake	Policeman	Uncredited
1978	Moment by Moment	Stu	
1981	Bloody Birthday	Sherriff James Brody	
1985	Thunder Alley	Richie's Father	
1986	Four Stars	Randy	Cast by Garry Marshall & Lynda Goodfriend
1989	Little Nemo: Adventures in Slumberland	Goblin General	Voice
1991	Rover Dangerfield	Max	Voice
1993	Broken Trust		
1995	Tall Tale	Bronson	
1996	Street Corner Justice	Martin Hayworth	
1997	Volcano	L.A. Fire Chief	
2000	Starforce	Council Leader	
2000	Between Christmas and New Year's	Howard	
2001	Boys to Men	Joseph	(segment "The Confession"), (final film role)
