= Michael J. Pollard =

American actor (1939–2019)

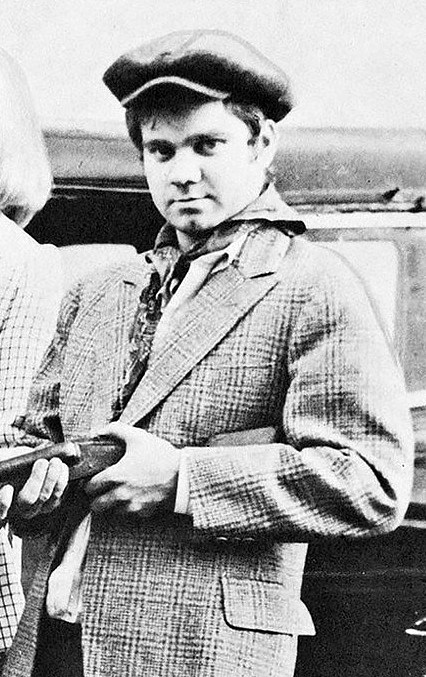
- Pollard, as seen on the poster for Bonnie and Clyde (1967)
- Born: Michael John Pollack Jr. May 30, 1939; Passaic, New Jersey, U.S.
- Died: November 20, 2019 (aged 80); Los Angeles, California, U.S.
- Education: Montclair Academy; Actors Studio
- Occupation: Actor
- Years active: 1958–2012
- Spouse: Beth Howland (m. 1961; div. 1969)
- Children: 2

Michael John Pollard (born Michael John Pollack Jr.; May 30, 1939 – November 20, 2019) was an American character actor. With his distinctive bulbous nose, dimpled chin and smirk, he gained a cult following, usually portraying quirky, off-beat, simplistic but likeable supporting characters. He was best known for his role as C. W. Moss in the film Bonnie and Clyde (1967), which earned him critical acclaim along with nominations for an Academy Award, a British Academy Film Award, and two Golden Globe Awards. Other notable appearances include The Wild Angels (1966), Hannibal Brooks (1969), Little Fauss and Big Halsy (1970), Dirty Little Billy (1972), Roxanne (1987), American Gothic (1988), and Tango & Cash (1989).

== Early life ==
Pollard was born in Passaic, New Jersey, and brought up in the nearby North Jersey communities of Garfield and Clifton. He was the son of Sonia V. (née Dubanowich) and Michael John Pollack, a bar manager. His parents were both of Polish descent. His mother was born in New York, and his father was born in New Jersey. Pollard's father supported his wife and Michael Jr. by working 60 hours a week as a barman at O'Rourke's Tap Room. Pollard attended Montclair Academy (now Montclair Kimberley Academy) and Actors Studio in New York.

== Career ==
=== Early career ===
Pollard had his earliest screen roles in television, with multiple appearances in programs broadcast during 1959. He had two roles in episodes of Alfred Hitchcock Presents: "Appointment at Eleven", a minor part as a shoeshine boy and as herpetologist Hansel Eidelpfeiffer in "Anniversary Gift". Pollard also portrayed Homer McCauley, the dramatic lead, in a television adaptation of William Saroyan's novel The Human Comedy, narrated by Burgess Meredith and broadcast as an episode of the DuPont Show of the Month. That same year Pollard appeared in David Hedison's 16-segment NBC espionage TV series Five Fingers in the episode "The Unknown Town".

Later that same year, Pollard appeared in episode five of CBS's The Many Loves of Dobie Gillis as Jerome Krebs, the first cousin of Maynard G. Krebs, played by Bob Denver, who in real life had been drafted into the United States Army. Pollard's character was to have been a replacement for Maynard but disappeared when Denver was classified 4-F and was able to return to the series.

Pollard created the non-singing role of Hugo Peabody in the original Broadway production of Bye Bye Birdie. In 1962, Pollard appeared in the short-lived Robert Young comedy/drama series Window on Main Street in the episode "The Boy Who Got Too Many Laughs". That same year he was cast in the role of Virgil, Deputy Barney Fife's socially awkward but talented cousin, on CBS's The Andy Griffith Show. He also played a quirky character in a 1962 TV pilot "The Laughmakers" written by Woody Allen, which never aired. The cast included Alan Alda and Louise Lasser but Pollard's role was uncredited.

In 1963, he appeared on an episode of ABC's Channing, a drama about college life starring Jason Evers and Henry Jones. That same year Pollard played the role of Digby Popham in the Walt Disney family musical Summer Magic, opposite Hayley Mills. He was cast as Danny Larkin in the 1963 episode "Tell Me When You Get to Heaven" of the ABC drama, Going My Way, starring Gene Kelly as a Roman Catholic priest in New York City.

Pollard played the role of Cyrus in a 1964 episode of the CBS western series Gunsmoke, titled "Journey for Three". That year he also appeared as Ted Mooney, son of Mr. Mooney, on The Lucy Show. In 1965, he played the role of "Jingles" in the episode "The Princess and the Paupers" on the ABC crime drama, Honey West, starring Anne Francis.

In 1966, Pollard starred in the role of Bernie in the popular NBC espionage series I Spy (the episode titled "Trial by Treehouse", aired October 19, 1966), with series regulars Bill Cosby and Robert Culp and guest stars Cicely Tyson and Raymond St. Jacques. Also in 1966, Pollard played the (uncredited) role of Stanley, the runny-nosed airplane mechanic, in The Russians Are Coming, the Russians Are Coming.

Pollard was short (five feet and six inches), which facilitated his getting youthful roles well into his career. One such role was in the original Star Trek series as the teenage leader of an all-child planet in the episode "Miri" (1966):

Michael J. Pollard is smarmily effective as, in essence, a cult leader for the kids, and the kids themselves manage a perfect blend of creepy, scary, and silly. The cry of “bonk-bonk on the head” is amusing right up until twenty kids pile onto Kirk and he emerges with blood seeping down the sides of his head.

He also appeared in a first-season episode of Irwin Allen's Lost In Space as a nameless Peter Pan-like boy who lives in the dimension behind all mirrors ("The Magic Mirror").

In 1967, Pollard played the supporting role of C. W. Moss in Arthur Penn's Bonnie and Clyde, with Warren Beatty, Faye Dunaway, Gene Hackman, and Estelle Parsons, for which he received Academy Award and Golden Globe Award nominations for Best Supporting Actor and won a BAFTA Award for Most Promising Newcomer to Leading Film Roles. The role led to his satiric candidacy in 1968 for President of the United States, complete with a campaign song: "Michael J. Pollard for President", recorded by DJ and recording artist Jim Lowe, best known for the 1950s hit "The Green Door". (The record features Pollard, asking, "Hey, man ... president of what ...?" and a snippet from real candidate Robert F. Kennedy; Kennedy was assassinated soon after the disc came out, which led many radio stations to refuse to play it.)

Also in 1967, Pollard played the lead role in Derek May's short drama, Niagara Falls. Later that year, he was once again singled out for praise in Carl Reiner's autobiographical comedy Enter Laughing; noted film critic Roger Ebert wrote:

Michael J. Pollard, an unknown before his fascinating entry in Bonnie and Clyde, brings his squint and grin to the part of Marvin, our hero's buddy, and steals every scene. There is something about Pollard that is absolutely original and seems to strike audiences as irresistibly funny and deserving of affection. If he works at it and gets a break or two, there will be no stopping him. Really. All he needs is visibility, and people will become addicted.

In 1969, he played the supporting role of an escaped American POW, "Packy", in the British World War II-themed comedy, Hannibal Brooks, directed by Michael Winner.

=== 1970s–2019 ===
In 1970, Pollard had a starring role as Little Fauss in the cult motorcycle racing movie Little Fauss and Big Halsy with Robert Redford, Noah Beery Jr., Lucille Benson, and Lauren Hutton.

Pollard starred in Dirty Little Billy (1972), a revisionist western depicting Billy the Kid at the beginning of his criminal career, set in Coffeyville, Kansas:

This is no typical, Tinseltown western though. It's more like The Making of a Sociopath, with Michael J. Pollard starring as displaced, 17-year-old Billy Bonney, in the days leading up to his evolution into the notorious Billy the Kid ... this is the perfect role for Pollard. And though a little old to play a teenager (he was 33), he hands us a Billy who's perpetually victimized by bad luck, until he finally blows a gasket at the very end and sparks his future.

In 1974, he played the role of a young man dying of cancer, in the season one opening episode, "The Time of His Life", of the trucking TV series Movin' On. He later had a key supporting role in the 1980 cult film Melvin and Howard about the Melvin Dummar-Howard Hughes Mormon Will controversy. Pollard also starred in 6 episodes of the failed CBS comedy series Leo & Liz in Beverly Hills (1986) with Harvey Korman and Valerie Perrine.

In 1987, Pollard played the role of an inquisitive volunteer firefighter, Andy, in the film Roxanne, starring Steve Martin. The following year Pollard played the role of Herman, a homeless man whose death strongly affects Bill Murray's character in the Christmas movie Scrooged. Also in 1988, Pollard played a villain in the horror film American Gothic.

In 1989, Pollard had a minor role in Sleepaway Camp III: Teenage Wasteland and a larger role (as the inventor of super weapons and a super car) in Tango & Cash, which also starred Kurt Russell and Sylvester Stallone. Also in 1989, he had a two-episode role as the fifth-dimensional imp-villain Mr. Mxyzptlk in the Superboy TV series.

Pollard played Bug Bailey in the popular 1990 film Dick Tracy.

In 1992, he starred in a sixth-season episode of Ray Bradbury Theater, The Handler, in which he portrayed a mortician who tried to give his clients a little extra treatment that he thought they should have. In 1993, he appeared in the horror film Skeeter. In 1997, he played the role of Aeolus in The Odyssey starring Armand Assante. In a 1999 episode of Becker, "Santa on Ice", he played a morgue technician.

Pollard continued to work in film and television into the 21st century, including his appearance as "Stucky" in the 2003 Rob Zombie-directed cult classic House of 1000 Corpses.

== Personal life ==
Pollard was married to actress Beth Howland, with whom he had one daughter, Holly Howland. He also had a son, Axel Emmett Pollard, from a second marriage to Annie Tolstoy.

Pollard died on November 20, 2019, from cardiac arrest in Los Angeles, California. He was 80.

== Acting credits ==
=== Film ===
- It Happened to Jane (1959) as Lloyd (uncredited)
- Hemingway's Adventures of a Young Man (1962) as George
- The Andy Griffith Show (1962) as Cousin Virgil
- The Stripper (1963) as Jelly
- Summer Magic (1963) as Digby Popham
- The Russians Are Coming, the Russians Are Coming (1966) as Stanley (airplane mechanic) (uncredited)
- The Wild Angels (1966) as Pigmy
- Enter Laughing (1967) as Marvin
- Caprice (1967) as Barney
- Bonnie and Clyde (1967) as C.W. Moss
- Niagara Falls (1967)
- Jigsaw (1968) as Dill
- Hannibal Brooks (1969) as Packy
- Little Fauss and Big Halsy (1970) as Little Fauss
- The Legend of Frenchie King (1971) as The Sheriff
- Morbo (1972) as Hombre de la casa
- Dirty Little Billy (1972) as Billy Bonney
- Sunday in the Country (1974) as Leroy
- Four of the Apocalypse (1975) as Clem
- Between the Lines (1977) as The Hawker
- Melvin and Howard (1980) as Little Red\
- Heated Vengeance (1985) as Snake
- Riders of the Storm (1986) as Tesla
- The Patriot (1986) as Howard
- America (1986) as Bob Jolly
- Roxanne (1987) as Andy
- American Gothic (1988) as Woody
- Scrooged (1988) as Herman
- Season of Fear (1989) as Bob
- Fast Food (1989) as Bud
- Night Visitor (1989) as Stanley Willard
- Sleepaway Camp III: Teenage Wasteland (1989) as Herman Miranda
- Next of Kin (1989) as Harold
- Heartstopper (1989) as Dr. Lubbock
- Tango & Cash (1989) as Owen
- Why Me? (1990) as Ralph
- I Come in Peace (1990) as Boner
- Dick Tracy (1990) as Bug Bailey
- The Arrival (1991) as Lou
- Joey Takes a Cab (1991) as Alan
- Another You (1991) as Brad (uncredited)
- The Art of Dying (1991) as Delbert
- Motorama (1991) as Lou
- Split Second (1992) as The Rat Catcher
- Arizona Dream (1993) as Fabian
- Skeeter (1993) as Hopper
- Mad Dog Time (1996) as Red Mash
- The Odyssey (1997) as Aeolus
- Stir (1997) as Hotel Manager
- Merchants of Venus (1998) as The Senator
- The Unknown Cyclist (1998) as Gabe Sinclair
- Tumbleweeds (1999) as Mr. Cummings
- The Debtors (1999)
- Forever Lulu (2000) as Hippie
- Danny and Max (2000) as Berquist
- Out of the Black (2001) as Ned
- House of 1000 Corpses (2003) as Stucky
- Sunburnt Angels (2011) as Cards
- The Woods (2012) as Moose

=== Television ===
- Alfred Hitchcock Presents (1959) (Season 5 Episode 3: "Appointment at Eleven") as Shoeshine Boy; (Season 5 Episode 6: "Anniversary Gift") as Hansel Eidelpfeiffer
- Gunsmoke (1964) as Cyrus
- Lost in Space (1966) (Season 1 Episode 21: "The Magic Mirror") as The Boy
- Star Trek: The Original Series (1966) (Season 1 Episode 8: "Miri") as Jahn
- The Fall Guy (1984) as Billy Hutton
- Superboy (1989) as Mister Mxyzptlk

=== Theatre ===
- Comes a Day (1958) as Joe Glover
- A Loss of Roses 1959) as Geoffrey Beamis
- Bye Bye Birdie (1960) as Hugo Peabody
- Enter Laughing (1963) as Marvin
- Curse of the Starving Class (1978) as Emerson

== In popular culture ==
- In 1968, DJ-turned-singer Jim Lowe (who hit the top of the charts in 1956 with "The Green Door") recorded "Michael J. Pollard for President" on the Buddah Records label.
- Pollard suggested the title for the Traffic song "The Low Spark of High Heeled Boys".
- AMT released a 1/25 model kit of the Michael J. Pollard "Flower Power 1936 Ford" Item # T218-200.
- Actor Michael J. Fox, whose real middle name is Andrew, adopted the middle initial "J." as a homage to Pollard.
