= All Tied Up =

- Directed by: John Mark Robinson
- Written by: Robert Madero; Isabel Mulá
- Produced by: Isabel Mulá
- Starring: Zach Galligan; Teri Hatcher; Lara Harris
- Cinematography: Alfredo F. Mayo
- Edited by: Peter Teschner
- Music by: Bernardo Bonezzi
- Distributed by: Irongate Entertainment Group
- Release date: May 11, 1994
- Running time: 90 minutes
- Countries: United States; Spain
- Language: English

All Tied Up is a 1994 comedy film directed by John Mark Robinson and starring Zach Galligan, Teri Hatcher, and Lara Harris. It was filmed in Los Angeles, California, United States.

== Plot ==
Brian (Zach Galligan) buys an engagement ring for Linda (Teri Hatcher), his girlfriend who is out of town. She returns early and catches him in bed with another woman, the latest in a series of infidelities. She dumps him. He forces his way into the house she shares with roommates Kim and Sharon, hoping to reconcile with Linda. He knocks himself out and the women tie him to a bed for several days, "Home Shopping Network" blaring. They dress him in a skirt, shave him with a rusty razor, feed him only squash, buy jewelry on his credit card, and nearly cost him his job by preventing him from going to an important interview. Linda ultimately releases him.

Brian remains smitten and returns to the house after a few days, kidnaps Linda, and brings her to his own house where he ties her to a chair. She is unpersuaded by his love and he releases her, but she later changes her mind and they reconcile with the agreement that she will be able to tie him up during future sexual escapades.

== Cast ==
- Zach Galligan as Brian Hartley
- Teri Hatcher as Linda Alissio
- Lara Harris as Kim Roach
- Tracy Griffith as Sharon Stevens
- Abel Folk as Max
- Edward Blatchford as Detective Frank Steinham
- Olivia Brown as Tara
- Rachel Sweet as J.J.
- Melora Walters as Bliss
- Viviane Vives (credited as Vivianne Vives) as Carmen
- Phyllis Chase as Bone's Agent
- Alvino Johnson as Slim Jim Bone
