= Sean Marshall (actor) =

American actor

- Occupations: Actor, singer
- Years active: 1971–1980

Sean Marshall is an American former actor and singer.

== Career ==
He was in more than ten movies including The Deadly Trackers, The New Adventures of Heidi and the Disney animated short film The Small One, but he is most commonly known for playing the protagonist Pete in the 1977 Disney movie Pete's Dragon.

He also starred in two television series The Fitzpatricks which aired in 1977–78 for 13 episodes and The MacKenzies of Paradise Cove which aired in 1979 for 6 episodes. Marshall was a guest star in many of the popular series of his time including Kung Fu, Emergency!, Code R, The Carol Burnett Show and Tony Orlando and Dawn to name a few. Marshall was also a prolific TV commercial, radio, print and stage actor during seven years in the entertainment industry.

== Filmography ==
Year	Title	Role	Notes
1973	Kung Fu	Abel Lovitt	Episode: "The Stone"
1973	The Deadly Trackers	Kevin Kilpatrick	Feature film
1974	Little House on the Prairie	Boy	Episode: "If I Should Wake Before I Die"
1977	ABC Weekend Specials	Joe Willie	Episode: "Valentine's Second Chance"
1977	Code R	Gary	Episode: "The Aliens"
1977–78	The Fitzpatricks	Max Fitzpatrick	Main cast (13 episodes)
1977	Pete's Dragon	Pete	Feature film
1978	Stickin' Together	Michael MacKenzie	Television pilot (aka Wonderland Cove)
1978	The New Adventures of Heidi	Peter	Television film
1978	The Small One	Boy (voice)	Animated short film
1979	The MacKenzies of Paradise Cove	Michael MacKenzie	Main cast (6 episodes)
1980	To Race the Wind	Wilson	Television film
