= Pete's Dragon (1977 film) =

1977 American musical fantasy comedy by Don Chaffey

- Original film poster by Paul Wenzel
- Directed by: Don Chaffey
- Written by: Malcolm Marmorstein
- Based on: "Pete's Dragon and the USA (Forever After)" by Seton I. Miller and S. S. Field
- Produced by: Jerome Courtland; Ron W. Miller
- Starring: Helen Reddy; Jim Dale; Mickey Rooney; Red Buttons; Shelley Winters
- Cinematography: Frank Phillips
- Edited by: Gordon D. Brenner
- Music by: Irwin Kostal
- Production company: Walt Disney Productions
- Distributed by: Buena Vista Distribution
- Release date: November 3, 1977
- Running time: 129 minutes
- Country: United States
- Language: English
- Budget: $10 million
- Box office: $36–39.6 million

Pete's Dragon is a 1977 American musical fantasy film directed by Don Chaffey, produced by Jerome Courtland and Ron Miller, and written by Malcolm Marmorstein. Based on the unpublished short story "Pete's Dragon and the USA (Forever After)" by Seton I. Miller and S. S. Field, it stars Helen Reddy, Jim Dale, Mickey Rooney, Red Buttons, and Shelley Winters.

The live-action/animated project was initially conceived in 1957 as a two-part episode of the Disneyland television series, but it was shelved until it was revived as a musical film in 1975. The film was released on November 3, 1977, to mixed reviews from critics, though some praised the animation.

The film received two nominations at the 50th Academy Awards, for musical scoring and original song. Capitol Records released a single of Reddy performing "Candle on the Water" (with a different arrangement from that in the film) that reached #27 on the Adult Contemporary charts.

The film spawned a remake made by Walt Disney Pictures and released in 2016.

== Plot ==
In early 1900s Maine, an orphan named Pete flees from the Gogans – an abusive farm family that previously purchased him – with the assistance of an unseen force he calls Elliott. They call for him to return and promise they will treat him better, while also intending to punish him severely. After they abandon their search, Pete falls asleep. The next morning, he awakens and Elliott is revealed to be a green dragon that can turn invisible.

Pete and Elliott visit Passamaquoddy, where the invisible Elliott's clumsiness causes Pete to be labeled a source of bad luck. Lampie, the lighthouse keeper, stumbles out of a tavern and encounters him. Elliott makes himself visible and Lampie, terrified, runs to the townspeople, who dismiss his claims as a drunken rant. While the two take refuge in a seaside cave, Lampie's daughter Nora appears, warning that Pete is not safe there because of the incoming tide. Realizing he is an orphan and not from the area, she offers him shelter at the lighthouse. He learns the story of her fiancé, Paul, whose ship was lost at sea the year before, and promises to ask Elliott to try locating him.

Itinerant quack Dr. Terminus and his assistant, Hoagy, win over the gullible townspeople. Hoagy tries to tell Dr. Terminus about Elliott, but he does not believe him. The next day, the local fishermen complain about the scarcity of fish, believing it is Pete's fault. Nora says the fishing grounds shift from time to time and Pete should be welcomed into town. That night, Nora and Lampie argue over his claims of seeing Elliott and her belief that Paul will return.

Nora takes Pete to start school, where the teacher, Miss Taylor, unfairly punishes him for Elliott's antics. Enraged, Elliott smashes into the schoolhouse, leaving his shape in the wall and frightening the townspeople. Dr. Terminus, now convinced Elliott is real, discovers from a book that any physical property from dragons can be used for remedies and tonics, and conspires with Hoagy to exploit Elliott for medical profit. Pete accepts Nora and Lampie's invitation to live with them. When the Gogans arrive in town and demand he be returned, they brandish a document proving they had legally bought him for fifty dollars (plus fees), but Nora refuses to surrender him. As the Gogans chase them in a boat, Elliott sinks it, saving Pete. Dr. Terminus makes a deal with the Gogans to capture Pete and Elliott, even convincing the townspeople that capturing Elliott will solve their problems.

That evening, a storm blows in, while at sea, a ship approaches Passamaquoddy with Paul on board. Dr. Terminus lures Pete to the boathouse while Hoagy does the same to Elliott, who gets caught in a net, but frees himself. He retrieves Pete in a confrontation with the Gogans, who finally accept defeat and flee after he destroys their document. Dr. Terminus attempts to harpoon him, but his leg gets caught in the rope and he is sent catapulting through the ceiling, ending up dangling upside down near a utility pole. Elliott saves the Mayor, Miss Taylor, and the members of the Town Board from a falling utility pole, revealing himself to them. At the lighthouse, the lamp has been extinguished by a rogue wave. Elliott lights it with his fire, revealing himself to Nora and saving the ship.

The next morning, the Mayor and townspeople praise Elliott for his help, and Nora is reunited with Paul. He explains he was the sole survivor of a shipwreck at Cape Hatteras and suffered amnesia, but something knocked him out of bed and restored his memory. Elliott reveals to Pete that since he has a new family now and is safe at last, he must move on to help another child in trouble. Soon accepting this, Pete says goodbye to him as he and his family watch him fly away, with Pete reminding him that he is supposed to be invisible as he disappears into the sky.

== Cast ==
- Helen Reddy as Nora, the kind daughter of the local lighthouse keeper.
- Jim Dale as Dr. Terminus, a scheming quack and showman.
- Mickey Rooney as Lampie, the local lighthouse keeper and Nora's father.
- Red Buttons as Hoagy, the assistant of Dr. Terminus.
- Shelley Winters as Lena Gogan, the matriarch of the Gogans.
- Sean Marshall as Pete, an orphan escaping the cruel Gogans.
- Jane Kean as Miss Taylor, the strict, no-nonsense, and unfair teacher.
- Jim Backus as the Mayor of Passamaquoddy.
- Charles Tyner as Merle Gogan, the patriarch of the Gogans.
- Gary Morgan as Grover Gogan, Merle and Lena's older sadistic son.
- Jeff Conaway as Willie Gogan, Merle and Lena's younger sadistic son.
- Cal Bartlett as Paul, a sailor who disappeared at sea and Nora's fiancé.
- Walter Barnes as the Captain of the ship Paul returns home on.
- Charlie Callas as the vocal effects for Elliott, a dragon who befriends Pete.

== Music ==
The film's songs were written by Al Kasha and Joel Hirschhorn. Irwin Kostal composed the score. "Candle on the Water" was nominated for the Academy Award for Best Original Song.

No.	Title	Performer(s)	Length
1.	"The Happiest Home in These Hills"	Shelley Winters, Charles Tyner, Gary Morgan & Jeff Conaway
2.	"Boo Bop Bop Bop Bop (I Love You, Too)"	Sean Marshall & Charlie Callas
3.	"I Saw a Dragon"	Mickey Rooney, Helen Reddy & Chorus
4.	"It's Not Easy"	Helen Reddy & Sean Marshall
5.	"Passamashloddy"	Jim Dale, Red Buttons & Chorus
6.	"Candle on the Water"	Helen Reddy
7.	"There's Room for Everyone"	Helen Reddy, Sean Marshall & Chorus
8.	"Every Little Piece"	Jim Dale & Red Buttons
9.	"Brazzle Dazzle Day"	Helen Reddy, Sean Marshall & Mickey Rooney
10.	"Bill of Sale"	Shelley Winters, Charles Tyner, Gary Morgan, Jeff Conaway & Helen Reddy
11.	"I Saw a Dragon (Reprise)"	Chorus
12.	"Brazzle Dazzle Day (Reprise)"	Helen Reddy, Sean Marshall, Mickey Rooney & Cal Bartlett

== Production ==
=== Development ===
In December 1957, Walt Disney Productions optioned the film rights to the short story "Pete's Dragon and the U.S.A. (Forever After)" that was written by Seton I. Miller and S.S. Field, in which Miller was hired to write the script. Impressed with his performance in Old Yeller, Walt Disney had child actor Kevin Corcoran in mind to star in the project as a feature-length film. However, Disney considered the project to be more appropriate for his Disneyland anthology program, by which it was slated to be filmed as a two-part episode in the following year. In February 1958, Variety reported that filming was scheduled to begin in October. By the following spring, veteran screenwriter Noel Langley had completed his draft of the script. However, Disney was still unsure of how to approach the project, and the project was placed in turnaround.

In 1968, writers Bill Raynor and Myles Wilder were hired to write the script, and completed their outline in October. They submitted their outline to the studio for review, but the project continued to languish in development. In 1975, producer Jerome Courtland re-discovered the project and hired writer Malcolm Marmorstein to write the script. For his script, Marmorstein revised the story from being in contemporary time into a period setting, and had the dragon changed from being wholly imaginary into a real one. In earlier drafts, Elliott was mostly invisible aside from one animated sequence, in which Dr. Terminus would chop up the dragon for his get-rich scheme. However, veteran Disney artist Ken Anderson felt the audience would "lose patience" with the idea and lobbied for Elliott to be seen more in his visible form during the film. In retrospect, Marmorstein conceded that "We tried a completely invisible dragon, but it was no fun. It was lacking. It's a visual medium, and you're making a film for kids." He also named the dragon "Elliott" after actor Elliott Gould (who was a friend from his theater days), and named the town "Passamaquoddy" after the real Native American tribe in Maine.

In October 1975, the songwriting duo of Al Kasha and Joel Hirschhorn were assigned to compose the musical score. The production was directed by British filmmaker Don Chaffey, who had made two smaller films for Disney in the early 1960s between directing larger fantasy adventures (Jason and the Argonauts, One Million Years B.C.) for others.

=== Locations ===
The lighthouse for the film was built on Point Buchon Trail in Montana De Oro State Park located south of Los Osos, California, substituting for Maine. It was equipped with such a large beacon that Disney had to get special permission from the Coast Guard to operate it, since doing so during filming would have confused passing ships. Pacific Gas and Electric opened the Point Buchon Trail and allows hikers access to where filming took place (35°14′49.08″N 120°53′50.63″W).

=== Animation ===
The film is the first involving animation in which none of the Nine Old Men—Disney's original team of animators—were involved. One technique used in the movie involved compositing with a yellowscreen that was originally used in Mary Poppins and similar to today's greenscreen compositing, whereby up to three scenes might be overlaid together – for example, a live foreground, a live background, and an animated middle ground containing Elliott. Ken Anderson, who created Elliott, explained that he thought it would be appropriate to make him "a little paunchy" and not always particularly graceful at flying. Don Hahn, who was an assistant director to Don Bluth on Pete's Dragon, gained some experience working with a combination of live-action and animation before later going on to work on Who Framed Roger Rabbit.

== Release ==
Pete's Dragon premiered on November 3, 1977, at the Radio City Music Hall, in which the film ran 134 minutes. For its general release, it was edited down to 121 minutes. It was later re-released on March 9, 1984, shortened from 121 minutes to 104 minutes. The film's movie poster was painted by artist Paul Wenzel.

=== Soundtrack ===
A soundtrack recording (Disneyland 3138) was released that told much of the story and added a narrator, but unlike many other Disney book and records, used the actual dialogue recorded for the film, which the book presented in script format. The inclusion of story led to the omission of several songs, including "The Happiest Home in These Hills," "There's Room for Everyone," and "Bill of Sale," while "Brazzle Dazzle Day" is included only in instrumental.

=== Home media ===
The film was released on VHS in early 1980. It was re-released on VHS on October 28, 1994, as a part of Masterpiece Collection. It was originally slated to be released in the Walt Disney Gold Classic Collection line-up on December 5, 2000, but it was pushed back to January 16, 2001. The DVD includes bonus features such as two animated shorts Lighthouse Keeping and Man, Monsters and Mysteries, two vintage excerpts from the Disney Family Album episode on Ken Anderson and "The Plausible Impossible" from Disneyland, and both theatrical trailers for the film.

The film was re-released in a "High-Flying Edition" DVD on August 18, 2009. The DVD includes a half-hour documentary feature, a deleted storyboard sequence, original demo recordings of the songs, and several bonus features transferred from the Gold Classic Collection release. It was released on the 35th-anniversary edition Blu-ray on October 16, 2012.

== Reception ==
=== Critical reaction ===
Janet Maslin of The New York Times praised the film declaring it "the most energetic and enjoyable Disney movie in a long while." She noted, "Sean Marshall doesn't sing well, but Helen Reddy does, so she often accompanies his vocals. Miss Reddy is serviceable but undistinguished as an actress—she has a tendency to behave as if she were a very bright light bulb in a very small lamp—but she so often finds herself in the company of Messrs. Rooney, Dale or Buttons that her scenes work well." However, she was critical of the film's length and the excessive alcohol consumption.

Kathleen Carroll of the New York Daily News gave the film three stars out of four, criticizing the score and the live-action footage, but praising the animation of the dragon and the performances, writing "Sean Marshall, as Pete, looks and acts natural on camera which makes him a refreshing change from those sweet little cherubs usually cast in Disney movies. Miss Reddy plays her role with crisp efficiency and fortunately receives strong support for the rest of the cast, particularly Dale, so slick and funny as the conniving medicine man he nearly upstages the cuddly dragon."

Variety wrote the film was "an enchanting and humane fable which introduces a most lovable animal star (albeit an animated one)." They praised the combination of live-action and animation as "never before more effectively realized" and commented that the film suffered "whenever Elliott is off screen."

John Skow of Time wrote the film was "likeable fantasy", but dismissed the musical numbers as "a good opportunity to line up for more popcorn."

Charles Champlin of the Los Angeles Times wrote, "At 2 hours 7 minutes it is a trying span for small sitters. The animated excitements keep stopping for songs by Al Kasha and Joel Hirschhorn, but they are not showstoppers in the grand sense. Bland, perfunctory and too numerous is more like it."

Gene Siskel of the Chicago Tribune gave the film two stars out of four and wrote that "we get the same tired Disney formula: a gooey-faced kid in a phony sound-stage world populated by old actors required to perform ancient vaudeville routines ... Compared to the great Disney animation classics, 'Pete's Dragon' is just TV fare on the wide screen."

Gary Arnold of The Washington Post wrote that the film "was apparently meant to be a big, rousing musical comedy-fantasy, but it's staged and photographed without musical-comedy energy, flair or coordination ... Perhaps children can be counted on to enjoy Elliott's mugging and the slapstick interludes that occasionally interrupt the tedium, but parents will see this one more as a chore."

Critic Leonard Maltin observed that Disney made several attempts to recreate the appeal and success of Mary Poppins (1964), and that Pete's Dragon did not come close on that score. However, he added that it might please children, and that "the animated title character is so endearing that it almost compensates for the live actors' tiresome mugging."

Thomas J. Harris, in his book Children’s Live-Action Musical Films: A Critical Survey and Filmography, heavily criticized the story as well as the compositing of the animated Elliott; he also found the "Mary Poppinsish ending" to be "thoroughly unmotivated", because Pete's life before meeting Elliott is never fleshed out.

In 2006, Elliott was ranked fifth on a top 10 list of movie dragons by Karl Heitmueller for MTV Movie News.

On the review aggregator website Rotten Tomatoes, the film has an approval rating of 56% based on 27 reviews, with an average rating of 5/10. The site's consensus states: "Boring and slow, this is a lesser Disney work, though the animation isn't without its charms." Metacritic gave film a score of 46 based on 5 reviews, indicating "mixed or average reviews".

=== Box office ===
During its initial release, the film grossed $16.1 million in distributor rentals from the United States and Canada, which was ranked sixteenth on Variety's box office hits list of 1978. However, the returns were considered disappointing for Disney who were hoping for a Mary Poppins-sized blockbuster. The film has a lifetime domestic gross ranging from $36 to 39.6 million.

=== Accolades ===
Award	Category	Recipients	Result	Ref.
Academy Awards	Best Original Song Score and Its Adaptation or Adaptation Score	Song Score by Al Kasha and Joel Hirschhorn; Adapted by Irwin Kostal	Nominated	
Academy Awards	Best Original Song	"Candle on the Water"; Music and Lyrics by Al Kasha and Joel Hirschhorn	Nominated	
Golden Globe Awards	Best Original Score	Joel Hirschhorn	Nominated	
Saturn Awards	Best Fantasy Film		Nominated	
Saturn Awards	Best Supporting Actor	Red Buttons	Nominated	
Saturn Awards	Best Costume	Chuck Keehne and Emily Sundby	Nominated	

== Remake ==
In March 2013, Disney announced a remake of the film, written by David Lowery and Toby Halbrooks, the director/writer and co-producer (respectively) of the Sundance hit Ain't Them Bodies Saints (2013). It re-imagines a venerable Disney family and is presented as a straightforward drama as opposed to a musical. Principal photography commenced in January 2015 in New Zealand, with Lowery directing, and subsequently released on August 12, 2016.

== Bibliography ==
- Koenig, David (1997). Mouse Under Glass: Secrets of Disney Animation & Theme Parks. Bonaventure Press. ISBN 978-0964060517.
