= Sleepaway Camp (film series) =

American slasher film series

- Official franchise logo
- Created by: Robert Hiltzik
- Original work: Sleepaway Camp (1983)
- Owners: American Eagle Films (1983); Double Helix Films (1988–1992); Go2Sho/Return to Sleepaway Corp. (2003)
- Years: 1983–2012

Films and television
- Films: List of films

Sleepaway Camp is an American slasher film series consisting of five films, one of which was not fully completed. The franchise primarily focuses on serial killer Angela Baker and the murders she commits, largely at summer camps.

Robert Hiltzik directed both the original 1983 film and Return to Sleepaway Camp, while Michael A. Simpson oversaw Sleepaway Camp II: Unhappy Campers and Sleepaway Camp III: Teenage Wasteland, which introduced comedic elements into the franchise; Sleepaway Camp IV: The Survivor was directed by Jim Markovic.

== Films ==
| Film | U.S. release date | Director(s) | Screenwriter(s) | Producer(s) |
|---|---|---|---|---|
| Sleepaway Camp | November 18, 1983 | Robert Hiltzik | Robert Hiltzik | Michele Tatosian and Jerry Silva |
| Sleepaway Camp II: Unhappy Campers | August 26, 1988 | Michael A. Simpson | Fritz Gordon | Jerry Silva and Michael A. Simpson |
| Sleepaway Camp III: Teenage Wasteland | August 4, 1989 | Michael A. Simpson | Fritz Gordon | Jerry Silva and Michael A. Simpson |
| Return to Sleepaway Camp | November 4, 2008 | Robert Hiltzik | Robert Hiltzik | Robert Hiltzik, Michele Tatosian and Thomas E. Van Dell |
| Sleepaway Camp IV: The Survivor | March 23, 2012 | Jim Markovic | Tom Clohessy | Krishna Shah |

Sleepaway Camp story chronology
Original continuity
- Sleepaway Camp
- Sleepaway Camp II: Unhappy Campers
- Sleepaway Camp III: Teenage Wasteland
- Sleepaway Camp IV: The Survivor
Alternate continuity
- Sleepaway Camp
- Return to Sleepaway Camp

Sleepaway Camp IV began filming in 1992 but was not completed; some footage that was shot on the first day, just over half an hour long, was released as an exclusive fourth disc included with some editions of the Region 1 Sleepaway Camp box set. The footage was compiled and improved by the makers and official Sleepaway Camp sequels website creator John Klyza and made into a 70-minute film, which was released on March 23, 2012, with online distribution.

Return to Sleepaway Camp was shot in 2003 and initially planned for release in 2006; it was eventually released in 2008 after improvements to the special effects were made.

Sleepaway Camp Reunion was set for DVD release by Magnolia Pictures in October 2011, with a limited 3D release in theaters, but the film was not made. The script for another sequel, tentatively titled Sleepaway Camp: Berserk, was co-written by the director of Sleepaway Camp II and III, Michael A. Simpson, with Fred Willard, an author.

=== Overview ===
The original Sleepaway Camp was written and directed by Robert Hiltzik and released in 1983. The film opens in an idyllic lake in summer, and shows a man, John Baker, and his two children, Angela and Peter, swimming around and on board a boat. Another group of teenagers are motorboating and in a freak accident run over John and one of the children, killing them. The film then cuts to a few years later, with a shy and quiet Angela, played by Felissa Rose, living with her eccentric aunt Dr. Martha Thomas and cousin Ricky. Martha sends the young teens off to summer camp at Camp Arawak. After the arrival of the teenage campers, several are mysteriously murdered by an unseen killer. All of the victims had at one point teased or tormented Angela, dying soon after. It is not revealed until the twist ending of the film that the killer is in fact "Peter", who survived the boat accident and was raised as his deceased sister Angela by his aunt.

Sleepaway Camp II: Unhappy Campers was made and released in 1988, directed by Michael A. Simpson and written by Fritz Gordon. It follows another group of teenagers at a summer camp, this time named Camp Rolling Hills. This film introduces Pamela Springsteen as an older, more confident, happy and expressive Angela Baker, named "Angela Johnson" who, unlike the first film, is shown as the killer within the first few minutes of the film. It features comedic elements, mostly jokes made by Angela as she kills her fellow campers for being "bad" campers - disobeying the rules (e.g. having sex, smoking or swearing/harassing others), getting in her way or suspecting her of being psychopathic.

Sleepaway Camp III: Teenage Wasteland, filmed back-to-back with Unhappy Campers and largely featuring the same crew, follows Angela, who murders a prospective camper named Maria and takes her identity and place at the reopened Camp Rolling Hills, renamed Camp New Horizons, and is looking to change its reputation and brand to one of friendship amongst teenagers of different social classes and racial backgrounds. The campers are separated into groups with adult leaders, but Angela/Maria makes her way around the woods, integrating herself into the groups and killing the campers and leaders. Angela shows more of a sense of abandon in killing the campers this time around, some of whom she kills for next to no reason.

Sleepaway Camp IV: The Survivor was the planned fourth entry in the series and was partially filmed in 1992 before being abandoned due to the production company, Double Helix Films, going bankrupt. It follows a "survivor" of the original three films, Alison, who seeks psychiatric help after having nightmares about the camp site and the murders that took place there. She then travels back to the camp after receiving advice that revisiting might help her overcome her problems. After several events (and murders), however, she begins to suspect she may be Angela without knowing it, being revealed near the film's conclusion.

After years of tracking down those involved with the film's production including the director Jim Markovic, a team helped to uncover and compile additional footage, incorporating scenes from the first three films into flashback sequences and helping expand the initial 34-minute running time of the first day of takes from The Survivor and make them into a full-length, 70-minute completed film. It was released online on March 23, 2012 (although it was initially announced that there would "likely not be a specific release date") and is manufactured on-demand.

The following film in the franchise, Return to Sleepaway Camp, was filmed from September to November 2003, but due to supposedly poor special effects, its straight-to-DVD release was delayed until 2008 in order to have time to improve them. It again features Robert Hiltzik as director and writer. The film ignores the plotline of the second and third films. It follows another, more chaotic camp, Camp Manabe, with an overweight, trouble-making and bullied teenage boy named Alan as its main character. Murders are again committed by an unknown person at the camp, but it is revealed that Angela has made a return in another disguise, a male police officer named Sheriff Jerry who uses an artificial voice box due to supposedly having had throat cancer.

Hiltzik reportedly planned a further sequel following Return titled Sleepaway Camp Reunion, initially announced to be released in October 2011, but it is unknown if it evolved past the pre-production stages. It was set to have a limited release to theaters in 3D and would see the return of Angela, Ricky and Aunt Martha.

Similarly to Reunion, another entry in the series was co-written by the director of Sleepaway Camp II and III, Michael A. Simpson despite the fact that Simpson had no claim to the rights of the series. It was prospectively titled Sleepaway Camp: Berserk and reportedly introduced supernatural aspects into the series, but as of 2017, nothing has materialized.

In 2013, the franchise was set to be rebooted, but no progress was made like for the other aborted projects.

In 2020, Felissa Rose said that a sixth Sleepaway Camp film was in the works and also expressed interest to play Angela again.

== Cast and characters ==
List indicators
- This table shows the principal characters and the actors who have portrayed them throughout the franchise.
- A dark grey cell indicates the character was not in the film, or that the character's presence in the film has not yet been announced.
- A ^{C} indicates a cameo appearance.
- A ^{P} indicates an appearance in onscreen photographs only.
- A ^{A} indicates an appearance in archival footage only.
- A ^{V} indicates a voice only role.
- A ^{Y} indicates a younger version of the role.

| Character | Films | | | | |
| Character | Sleepaway Camp | Sleepaway Camp II: Unhappy Campers | Sleepaway Camp III: Teenage Wasteland | Sleepaway Camp IV: The Survivor | Return to Sleepaway Camp |
| Character | 1983 | 1988 | 1989 | 2012 | 2008 |
|---|---|---|---|---|---|
| Angela Baker Peter Baker Angela Johnson Maria Allison Kramer | Felissa Rose Frank Sorrentino^{Y} Colette Lee Corcoran^{Y} | Pamela Springsteen | Pamela Springsteen | Carrie Chambers (Note: Additionally, Frank Sorrentino, Colette Lee Corcoran and Archie Liberace appear as Angela in archival footage from previous films.) Felissa Rose^{A} Pamela Springsteen^{A} | Felissa Rose |
| Richard "Ricky" Thomas | Jonathan Tiersten | | | Jonathan Tiersten^{A} | Jonathan Tiersten |
| Ronald "Ronnie" Angelo | Paul DeAngelo | | | Paul DeAngelo^{A} | Paul DeAngelo |
| Paul | Christopher Collet | | | Christopher Collet^{A} | |
| Mel Costic | Mike Kellin | | | Mike Kellin^{A} | |
| Meg | Katherine Kamhi | | | Katherine Kamhi^{A} | |
| Aunt Martha Thomas | Desiree Gould | | | Desiree Gould^{A} | |
| Ben | Robert Earl Jones | | | Robert Earl Jones^{A} | |
| Ally Burgess | | Valerie Hartman (Note: Additionally, Valerie Hartman was credited for her work in the third film as a Raccoon Wrangler.) | | Valerie Hartman^{A} | |
| Molly Nagle | | Renée Estevez | | Renée Estevez^{A} | |
| Sean Whitmore | | Tony Higgins | | Tony Higgins^{A} | |
| T.C. | | Brian Patrick Clarke | | Brian Patrick Clarke^{A} | |
| Uncle John | | Walter Gotell | | Walter Gotell^{A} | |
| Mare | | Susan Marie Snyder | | Susan Marie Snyder^{A} | |
| Marcia Holland | | | Tracy Griffith | Tracy Griffith^{A} | |
| Tony DeHerrera | | | Mark Oliver | Mark Oliver^{A} | |
| Cindy Hammersmith | | | Kim Wall | Kim Wall^{A} | |
| Riff | | | Daryl Wilcher | Daryl Wilcher^{A} | |
| Lily Miranda | | | Sandra Dorsey | Sandra Dorsey^{A} | |
| Herman Miranda | | | Michael J. Pollard | Michael J. Pollard^{A} | |
| Eugene The Hunter | | | | Victor Campos | |
| Jack The Ranger | | | | John Lodico | |
| Frank Kostic | | | | | Vincent Pastore |
| Linda O'Casey | | | | | Jackie Tohn |
| Charlie | | | | | Isaac Hayes |
| Mickey | | | | | Lenny Venito |
| Karen | | | | | Erin Broderick |
| Terry "Weed" Williams | | | | | Adam Wylie |

== Reception ==
=== Box office performance ===
| Film | Release date (US) | Budget | Box office revenue (US) |
|---|---|---|---|
| Sleepaway Camp | November 18, 1983 | $350,000 | $11,000,000 |
| Sleepaway Camp II: Unhappy Campers | August 26, 1988 | $465,000 | —N/a |
| Sleepaway Camp III: Teenage Wasteland | December 15, 1989 | $465,000 | —N/a |
| Return to Sleepaway Camp | November 4, 2008 | $4,000,000 | —N/a |

=== Critical reception ===
| Film | Rotten Tomatoes | Metacritic |
|---|---|---|
| Sleepaway Camp | 82% (28 reviews) | 58/100 (4 reviews) |
| Sleepaway Camp II: Unhappy Campers | 58% (12 reviews) | —N/a |
| Sleepaway Camp III: Teenage Wasteland | 22% (9 reviews) | —N/a |
| Sleepaway Camp IV: The Survivor | —N/a | —N/a |
| Return to Sleepaway Camp | —N/a | —N/a |

== Home media ==
For the first three Sleepaway Camp films, early home video releases were made available. Each of the films from the original trilogy have been released in several countries around the world. In the United States, Sleepaway Camp was released not long following its theatrical exhibition. Its sequels Sleepaway Camp II: Unhappy Campers and Sleepaway Camp III: Teenage Wasteland were released on VHS format via Nelson Entertainment in October 1988 and December 15, 1989 respectively. In the United Kingdom, Sleepaway Camp was released on pre-cert VHS. Sleepaway Camp II and III were both released in cut versions under the titles Nightmare Vacation II and III. In part 2, the scenes removed were the tongue removal scene and Ally's drowning in the toilet scene. Both II and III were released via Futuristic Entertainment in the UK in the early 1990s. Both these versions were again released on DVD in the UK via 23rd Century Entertainment in low quality and still in their cut versions.

=== DVD ===
| Title | Release date | | | Additional |
| Title | Region 1 | Region 2 | Region 4 | Additional |
|---|---|---|---|---|
| Sleepaway Camp | August 8, 2000 | May 31, 2004 | TBA | Features Special features: Audio commentary with Robert Hiltzik, Felissa Rose and Jeff Hayes; Theatrical trailer; Rating: MPAA: R; BBFC: 15 |
| Sleepaway Camp II: Unhappy Campers | August 20, 2002 | May 31, 2004 | TBA | Features Special features: Audio commentary with Michael A. Simpson and Fritz Gordon; Behind the scenes footage and outtakes; Teaser trailer for Sleepaway Camp III: Teenage Wasteland; Theatrical trailer; Still galleries; Rating: MPAA: R; BBFC: 18 |
| Sleepaway Camp III: Teenage Wasteland | August 20, 2002 | May 31, 2004 | TBA | Features: Audio commentary with Michael A. Simpson and Fritz Gordon; Behind the scenes footage and outtakes; Deleted scenes featuring additional "gore" footage; Theatrical trailer; Still galleries; Rating: MPAA: R; BBFC: 15 |
| Trilogy Collection | August 20, 2002 | May 31, 2004 | TBA | Features: Released as "Survival Kit" in United States; The set had been re-issued twice in the U.S.; Released as "3-Disc Box Set" in the United Kingdom; The set had been re-issued once in the UK in slimmer packaging; See individual releases for special features |
| Sleepaway Camp IV: The Survivor | March 23, 2012 | TBA | TBA | Features Special features: John Altyn Music Video; Photo gallery; Rating: MPAA: Not Rated |
| Return to Sleepaway Camp | November 4, 2008 | TBA | April 13, 2012 | Features Special features: Behind the scenes; Interviews; Behind the scenes photo gallery; "Return to Sleepaway Camp" song - performed by Goat and Friends; Rating: MPAA: R; Australian Classification Board: MA15+ |

=== Blu-ray ===
| Title | Release date | | | Additional |
| Title | Region A | Region B (UK) | Region B (AUS) | Additional |
|---|---|---|---|---|
| Sleepaway Camp | May 27, 2014 | TBA | TBA | Special features: Commentary with Felissa Rose and Johathan Tierston (NEW); Commentary with Robert Hiltzik, Felissa Rose and Jeff Hayes; Interviews with cast and crew (NEW); Sleepaway Camp Scrapbook (NEW); Short film "Judy" by Jeff Hayes (NEW); Theatrical trailer; Meet Me At the Waterfront After the Social (NEW); Never before seen photos/storyboards of the scenes (NEW); Music video (NEW); TV spots (NEW) |
| Sleepaway Camp II: Unhappy Campers | June 9, 2015 | April 25, 2016 | TBA | Special features: Commentary with Michael A. Simpson and Fritz Gordon; Behind-the-scenes footage with audio commentary with Michael A. Simpson; A Tale of Two Sequels - Part One: Back to Camp - featuring interviews with cast and crew (NEW); Video promo trailer (NEW); Abandoned – filming locations of Sleepaway Camp II & III (NEW); Still galleries |
| Sleepaway Camp III: Teenage Wasteland | June 9, 2015 | April 25, 2016 | TBA | Special features: Commentary with Michael A. Simpson and Fritz Gordon; Behind-the-scenes footage; A Tale of Two Sequels - Part Two: New Victims & New Horizon - featuring interviews with cast and crew (NEW); Workprint of the longer cut of the film (NEW); Deleted scenes featuring additional "gore" footage; Home video promotional trailer; Still gallery; Trailer |

== Popular culture ==
In 2009, Felissa Rose reprised her role as Angela Baker in Caesar and Otto's Summer Camp Massacre, a spoof of the Sleepaway Camp film series.
