= The Perfect House =

The Perfect House may refer to:

- The Perfect House (2011 American film), directed by Kris Hulbert and Randy Kent
- The Perfect House (2011 Indonesian film), directed by Affandi Abdul Rachman
