= Return to Sleepaway Camp =

2008 American slasher film by Robert Hiltzik

- Official DVD cover by Magnolia Pictures
- Directed by: Robert Hiltzik
- Written by: Robert Hiltzik
- Produced by: Robert Hiltzik; Michele Tatosian; Thomas E. Van Dell
- Starring: Vincent Pastore; Jackie Tohn; Jonathan Tiersten; Paul DeAngelo; Isaac Hayes; Michael Gibney; Felissa Rose
- Cinematography: Ken Kelsch; Brian Pryzpek
- Edited by: Ron Kalish
- Music by: Rodney Whittenberg
- Production companies: GO2SHO; Return to Sleepaway Corp.
- Distributed by: Magnolia Pictures
- Release date: November 4, 2008
- Running time: 86 minutes
- Country: United States
- Language: English
- Budget: $4 million

Return to Sleepaway Camp is a 2008 American slasher film written and directed by Robert Hiltzik, and starring Vincent Pastore, Jackie Tohn, Jonathan Tiersten, Paul DeAngelo, Isaac Hayes, and Michael Gibney. The fourth installment (fifth chronologically) in the Sleepaway Camp film series and first film released direct-to-video, it is a direct sequel to Sleepaway Camp (1983), while ignoring the events of Sleepaway Camp II: Unhappy Campers (1988) and Sleepaway Camp III: Teenage Wasteland (1989).

== Plot ==
Several boys are lighting farts and after failing, Alan threatens them, but is soon stopped by camp counselor, Randy. In the dining hall, Alan gets into a violent confrontation with Randy after he complains about the food. Ronnie allows Alan to get something else to eat, but Alan gets in trouble with cook Mickey. Alan throws a butcher knife at Mickey and the camp owner, Frank, argues with Alan. Alan runs away, with his stepbrother Michael chasing him. In the kitchen, Mickey is killed after being held above and dumped into the deep fryer. His body is dumped in the trash compactor.

During the social, Alan is fooled by Terry "Weed" and Stan into smoking dried cow manure, which makes him cough and falls on Stan's crotch, earning him the nickname "Blowjob.". After the social, Weed is tied to a chair and gasoline is squirted down his throat. The killer sticks a lit cigarette in his mouth and his insides explode. Ronnie suspects the murders that happened twenty years ago are happening again, but Frank states the murders were accidental. A week later, Michael makes Alan look like he skinned frogs, and Karen and Marie run away. Michael, T.C. and Marie force Karen to lure Alan to the back of the stage, where they take his clothes off, tie him up, blindfold him and embarrass him at the social.

Ronnie suspects that counselor Petey is the killer for always being nearby when Alan is in trouble. After returning to his cabin, Frank is knocked unconscious with a hammer and wakes up with his head inserted in a birdcage. The mysterious killer opens the birdcage and places two rats. The rats eat through his head and down into his intestines. Randy and Linda go to the pump house to have sex. While Randy urinates, the killer ties him to a tree, using fishing line to wrap around his penis. Upon returning, Linda panics after hearing Randy placate the killer and drives off in the jeep, but the fishing line is tied to the jeep and tears off Randy's penis. Linda crashes after driving through a wrapped barbed wire line, which wraps around her face and kills her.

After Spaz visits T.C., a wooden spear comes through a hole in the floor while T.C. is looking into it and impales him through the eye. Jenny and Ronnie find Frank dead and begin rounding up everyone. Bella goes to her cabin, where she finds that the bunk above her has been replaced with a board with spikes. The killer jumps down from the rafters and lands on the top bunk, causing the spikes to impale Bella. T.C. and Bella are found dead and Ricky Thomas is called by Sheriff Jerry. Karen bumps into the killer and faints.

Karen wakes up with a rope hanging from a basketball hoop tied around her neck. The killer flips a switch to raise the net, causing Karen to be lifted off the ground. Michael arrives, causing the killer to run off, and lowers the net. After Karen tells him she thinks Alan is the killer, Sheriff Jerry consoles Karen while Michael grabs a croquet mallet and beats Alan with the mallet. The killer appears behind Michael as the screen fades to black.

Ronnie, Ricky and Jenny find a badly-wounded Alan. Sheriff Jerry walks up, explaining through his mechanical voice box that kids never learn and are always mean. Sheriff Jerry reveals himself to be Angela Baker. They find Michael, skinned alive on the ground, with Angela laughing maniacally.

In a post-credits scene, a flashback set three weeks before the film shows how Angela got her police disguise. She causes a brake fluid leak in a car and flags down Sheriff Pete, the real sheriff. She murders him by dropping the car on his head and steals his clothes to become the new sheriff.

== Cast ==
- Vincent Pastore as Frank Kostic
- Jackie Tohn as Linda O'Casey
- Jonathan Tiersten as Richard "Ricky" Thomas
- Paul DeAngelo as Ronnie Angelo
- Isaac Hayes as Charlie McLeod, the Chef
- Michael Gibney as Alan Chambers
- Felissa Rose as Angela Baker / Sheriff Jerry
- Lenny Venito as Mickey Cheverino
- Erin Broderick as Karen Berry
- Shahidah McIntosh as Bella Boyd
- Adam Wylie as Terry "Weed" Williams
- Kate Simses as Petey Vigo
- Brye Cooper as Randy Jillani
- Michael Werner as Michael Dam
- Christopher Shand as T.C. Dimas
- Jaime Radow as Jenny McKlank
- Samantha Hahn as Marie Neal
- Kole Evans as Dina Carpenter
- Carlo Vogel as Sheriff Pete Hernandez

== Production ==
=== Development ===
Development of Return to Sleepaway Camp dates back to 2000. The film had a troubled production process, partly due to several investors backing out of the project following a downturn in the U.S. economy after the September 11 attacks.

=== Casting ===
Auditions began in mid-2001 in New York City, with actress Felissa Rose, who portrayed Angela in the original film, working as a casting assistant. Rose reprised her role as Angela in the film, as did Jonathan Tiersten as Ricky.

=== Filming ===
Location scouting began in New York in the spring of 2003. Filming began on September 11, 2003, with the majority of the film being shot on location at Camp Starlight in Starlight, Pennsylvania.

=== Post-production ===
The film was scheduled to be released theatrically between 2004 and 2006, but due to unsatisfactory CGI effects and a lack of distribution deals, it did not see release until November 2008. An executive producer of the film, Thomas E. Van Dell, claimed that most of the corrected CGI had been completed by December 2006, but director, Robert Hiltzik, felt that it needed more work to meet his expectations. By 2007, compositors and CGI personnel had been hired by Van Dell to correct the effects. Additionally, a small special F/X group was hired to reshoot work unapproved by Hiltzik; such included the skinned body of the character Michael, additions to the death of camper T.C., and unfinished/pick-up shots.

== Release ==
The film was released directly-to-DVD in the United States by Magnolia Pictures on November 4, 2008, was released internationally in 2009.

== Reception ==
David Harley of Bloody Disgusting gave Return to Sleepaway Camp a 2/5, regarding it as a draggy, unimaginative, and unfunny film with an ending "that manages to disappoint with its banality". Dread Central's Steve Barton gave Return to Sleepaway Camp a 1½ out 5: "Gone is the really black humor of the first film. Gone is the insane twist. Gone are the inventive kills. And gone is nearly all of the charm that has kept this franchise alive. I would have rated this even lower if not for the nostalgia factor. Man, what a letdown". In his review for DVD Verdict, Gordon Sullivan wrote that "Return to Sleepaway Camp makes Sleepaway Camp III: Teenage Wasteland look like Shakespeare. A poor script, a total lack of compelling campers, and a too-brief glimpse of Angela all spell trouble for this nostalgic trip back to camp-land. I know that diehard fans of the original film will likely get suckered into watching this, but everyone else should stay far, far away".

Michael Gingold of Fangoria noted continuity errors in the film, commenting that "one sequence starts out in daytime, transitions to night and then goes back to day again. Eventually, the killings begin in earnest, but are neither creatively conceived nor imaginatively directed enough to have the kick of the best bloodbaths of the ’80s, with the “suspense” drawn out to the point of irritation."

A 1/4 was awarded by Arrow in the Head's Pat Torfe, who concluded: "A 'return' this is not. Hiltzik should've taken Sleepaway Camp IV: The Survivor's demise as a warning and let this series go quietly. Return is nothing what the original trilogy was in terms of kills or fun. It limps by on sloppy editing, unlikeable characters, unsatisfying kills and hopes that people get pulled in by the return of past characters".

In his book The Pleasure and Pain of Cult Horror Films: An Historical Survey (2009), writer and film historian Bartłomiej Paszylk describes Return to Sleepaway Camp as "just as trashy, but not quite as fun as the original."

== Sources ==
- Hayes, Jeff (2023). Sleepaway Camp: Making the Movie and Reigniting the Campfire. Cleveland, Ohio: 1984 Publishing. ISBN 978-1-948-22128-3.
- Paszylk, Bartłomiej (2009). The Pleasure and Pain of Cult Horror Films: An Historical Survey. Jefferson, North Carolina: McFarland & Company. ISBN 978-0-786-45327-6.
