= Sleepaway Camp III: Teenage Wasteland =

1989 American slasher film by Michael A. Simpson

- Theatrical release poster
- Directed by: Michael A. Simpson
- Written by: Fritz Gordon
- Based on: characters created by Robert Hiltzik
- Produced by: Jerry Silva; Michael A. Simpson
- Starring: Pamela Springsteen; Tracy Griffith; Mark Oliver; Michael J. Pollard
- Cinematography: Bill Mills
- Edited by: John David Allen; Amy Carey
- Music by: James Oliverio
- Release date: August 4, 1989
- Running time: 79 minutes 84 minutes (Uncut version)
- Country: United States
- Language: English
- Budget: $465,000

Sleepaway Camp III: Teenage Wasteland (Note: Onscreen title is Sleepaway Camp 3: Teenage Wasteland) (released as Nightmare Vacation III in the United Kingdom) is a 1989 American slasher film and the third installment in the Sleepaway Camp film series. Written by Fritz Gordon and directed by Michael A. Simpson, it stars Pamela Springsteen as Angela Baker, Tracy Griffith, Mark Oliver, and Michael J. Pollard. Taking place one year after the events in the previous film, it again follows the same transgender serial killer, Angela, who is targeting more teenagers at another summer camp.

A fourth film called Sleepaway Camp IV: The Survivor was intended to be released in 1992, but production stopped after the company went bankrupt upon shooting less than forty minutes (which was followed by a DVD release of the footage and one of a cobbled together cut). In 2008, Return to Sleepaway Camp, a direct sequel to the original film was released.

== Plot ==
One year after the events of the second film, Maria Nacastro is heading to camp. Suddenly, she is chased into an alleyway and run over by a garbage truck, driven by Angela Baker, who throws Maria's body into the back and compacts it. Angela poses as Maria in order to board the bus to Camp New Horizons, which is the same location of Camp Rolling Hills.

After arriving, news reporter Tawny Richards asks Angela to get her some cocaine. Angela gives her Ajax cleaner instead, which kills Tawny when she snorts it. After the campers have settled in, camp counselors Herman and Lily Miranda and Officer Barney Whitmore (the father of Sean Whitmore, murdered in the previous film) split the campers into three groups. Angela is placed in a group with Herman, Snowboy, Peter Doyle and Jan Hernandez.

While camping, Angela, leaving Snowboy and Peter to fish, finds Herman and Jan having sex and kills them both with a stick. That night, Angela sets off a firecracker in Peter's nose and burns Snowboy alive, along with the other bodies.

The next morning, Angela travels to Lily's campsite, where Bobby Stark, Cindy Hammersmith, Riff and Arab are camping. Angela switches places with Arab and decapitates her with an axe. Lily sets the campers out on a trust building exercise where Angela, having grown tired of Cindy's whiny and bigoted behavior, attaches her to a flag pole and drops her from a high height, killing her. After killing Cindy and grabbing the trash bag Lily wanted her to take out, she has a flashback of the cafeteria scene from the previous film. After luring her outside of the kitchen, Angela buries Lily in a trash hole and runs over her head with a lawnmower. Angela then rips Bobby's arms off before stabbing Riff with tent spikes.

The following morning, Angela travels to the remaining camp, where Barney, Tony DeHerrera, Marcia Holland, Anita Bircham and Greg Nakashima are camping. Angela tells Barney she is supposed to switch with Marcia. Barney accompanies them and Angela fakes a leg injury. As Barney tends to Angela, Marcia discovers Lily's body, after Angela tells her that Lily is just doing nothing outside and for Marcia to see. Barney yells for Marcia to run. After a tense stand-off, Angela shoots Barney dead. Angela catches up with Marcia and captures her.

That night, Angela ties the remaining campers together. She shows them the body of Barney and forces them to find Marcia in one of the cabins. Upon finding Marcia, Greg and Anita are killed by booby traps. Angela decides to let Marcia and Tony live but as she tries to leave Angela is stabbed numerous times by Marcia.

Marcia and Tony summon the police to the camp. Angela is taken to the hospital in an ambulance and she stabs a paramedic and a policeman with a syringe. When the ambulance driver asks what is going on, Angela replies, "Just taking care of business".

== Cast ==
- Pamela Springsteen as Angela Baker / "Maria Nacastro"
- Tracy Griffith as Marcia Holland
- Mark Oliver as Tony DeHerrera
- Kim Wall as Cindy Hammersmith
- Daryl Wilcher as Riff
- Sandra Dorsey as Lily Miranda
- Michael J. Pollard as Herman Miranda
- Cliff Brand as Officer Barney Whitmore
- Haynes Brooke as Bobby Stark
- Kyle Holman as Snowboy
- Jill Terashita as Arab
- Kashina Kessler as Maria Nacastro
- Randi Layne as Tawny Richards
- Chung Yen Tsay as Greg Nakashima
- Jarret Beal as Peter Doyle
- Sonya Maddox as Anita Bircham
- Stacie Lambert as Jan Hernandez
- Charles Lawlor as Paramedic
- Jerry Griffin as Policeman
- Mike Nagel as Ambulance Driver
- Richard Crabbe as TV News Cameraman (uncredited)

== Production ==
=== Development and filming ===
Jerry Silva, who had served as a co-producer on Sleepaway Camp, approached Double Helix Films about producing a follow-up to the film. Michael Hitchcock, then a staffer at Double Helix, was assigned to write both Sleepaway Camp II: Unhappy Campers and Sleepaway Camp III: Teenage Wasteland (the film's subtitle was inspired by a lyric from "Baba O'Riley" by the Who) and did so under the pseudonym of Fritz Gordon. Michael A. Simpson, a filmmaker based in Atlanta, was hired as director in the fall of 1987 and shot both Sleepaway Camp II and III back-to-back in order to keep the production budgets at $1 million or less. Simpson and Hitchcock felt that the "teen slasher film" genre had become "thematically exhausted" at the time. They decided to push the film into a comedic, self-referential direction, focusing on dark humor.

Like the first sequel, the third film was shot at a YMCA youth camp in Atlanta and Waco, Georgia. According to the commentary from the 2002 Survival Kit DVD, production of Part III began three days immediately after Sleepaway Camp II wrapped up. Production of both films lasted a total of six weeks, beginning on October 12, 1987 and ending on October 31, 1987 with the filming of the first scene of this film in which Angela (played by stunt coordinator Lonnie Smith) runs down Maria Nacastro (Kashina Kessler) with a garbage truck. This scene was filmed in downtown Atlanta near the intersection of Mitchell St and Forsyth St.

Several sequences of violence had to be trimmed in order for the MPAA to give the film an R rating. Anchor Bay Entertainment included some of this deleted footage on its 2002 DVD release.

Simpson delivered the red Ferrari used by the character Tawny Richards (Randi Layne) to the set. Falling in love with the car, he drove it down the Interstate at night, and personally moved it between scenes. Valerie Hartman, who portrayed the character of Ally in the previous film, is credited in the sequel as an assistant to the director and as a "raccoon wrangler".

=== Casting ===
Casting was done in Atlanta (by Shay Griffin), New York City, and Los Angeles. Felissa Rose, who had played Angela Baker in the original, was approached by the producers to reprise her role, but as she was busy with her enrollment at New York University at the time, the role was recast with Pamela Springsteen. Kyle Holman was told about the film by his agent. He watched the original Sleepaway Camp and hated it, initially declining to participate in Part III. Holman's agent convinced him to do so, saying that the film was being made by a different crew. Holman auditioned for the role of Tony DeHerrera, but was cast as Snowboy instead, while Mark Oliver was cast as Tony. Tracy Griffith, who had auditioned for the role of Angela, was cast as Marcia Holland. She had a brief romance with Oliver for a few weeks. Michael J. Pollard and Sandra Dorsey was cast as Herman and Lily Miranda. Kim Wall, who played Cindy Hammersmith, was uncomfortable with the character's racism, and kept her bra on in a scene where the female campers change clothes. Daryl Wilcher, who played Riff, was surprised about his casting, since he did not identify with the character and was introverted. Wilcher tried to make Riff as thuggish and tough as he could, ad-libbing the character's obscenities. Riff was supposed to spit on Cindy in one scene; Wilcher told Simpson that he was not comfortable about doing that to Wall, even though Wall said that she was fine with it. The scene was changed to Riff hitting Cindy in the face with the bowl of oatmeal. Wall cited the oatmeal scene as the reason why she wore her hair in a ponytail for most of the film.

Jill Terashita enjoyed playing the role of Arab (originally called "Action"), describing the character as "quite a mouthy little bitch". During filming, Sonya Maddox, who played Anita Bircham, went home for a weekend and returned with a cut and dye. Other actors and actresses cast for the film included Cliff Brand, Haynes Brooke, Kashina Kessler, Randi Layne, Chung Yen Tsay, Jarret Beal, Stacie Lambert, Charles Lawlor, Jerry Griffin, Mike Nagel, and Richard Crabbe. Most of the characters were named after characters from West Side Story, The Brady Bunch and The Munsters. Since some of the actors were underage, representatives of the Georgia Department of Labor were on set to prohibit the actors from being involved in scenes with sex and nudity, present on set during scenes with graphic kills, or using profanity.

=== Special effects ===
The practical and makeup effects were done by Bill "Splat" Johnson, Christina Cobb and Maritza Rodriguez.

=== Music ===
The film's score was composed by James Oliverio. The song "Sleepaway" (which plays over the end credits) was written and performed by John Altyn. The instruments used included a 1959 Gibson Les Paul Junior, a 1969 Fender Bassman 50-watt head, Yamaha keyboards, bass and cymbals (played by Altyn's engineer Bob Stander), and the LinnDrum drum machine (programmed by Stander). During the bridge, Altyn recorded voices saying, "Same ol' story," poking fun at the film's script.

== Releases ==
=== Home media ===
Sleepaway Camp III was released on VHS in the United States by Nelson Entertainment on December 15, 1989.

The film has been released twice on DVD in the United States by Anchor Bay Entertainment, first in 2002 with a single DVD edition, as well as in the Sleepaway Camp Survival Kit.

Anchor Bay Entertainment also released the title on DVD in the United Kingdom on 31 May 2004.

Scream Factory, under license from MGM, released the film for the first time on Blu-ray, on June 9, 2015, along with Sleepaway Camp II: Unhappy Campers.

== Reception ==
AllMovie gave the film a negative review, writing that Sleepaway Camp III: Teenage Wasteland is "cheaper, dumber, and more profoundly pointless, light years away from the imagination of the first film and an insult to Sleepaway Camp fans". On the review aggregator website Rotten Tomatoes, 13% of 8 critics' reviews are positive, with an average rating of 3.5/10.

The DVD review by William Harrison states that "Sleepaway Camp III: Teenage Wasteland runs on fumes despite some fun kills and another committed performance from Pamela Springsteen as murderous, transgender Angela Baker".

Bryan Kluger of High-Def Digest, reviewed the Blu-ray version of the film. His final thoughts about the film was that "Sleepaway Camp III: Teenage Wasteland is quite the entertaining film", adding that, according to him, "it's funnier than the other films in the franchise, and, of course, bloodier".
