= Christopher Collet =

American actor

- Born: March 13, 1968 (age 58); New York City, U.S.
- Occupation: Actor
- Years active: 1983–present
- Spouse: Nicole Dooley (m. 2005)
- Children: 3

Christopher Collet (/koʊˈleɪ/) (born March 13, 1968) is an American actor. He is known for his role in the 1983 film Sleepaway Camp. He also starred in the lead role in the 1986 film The Manhattan Project.

== Early life, family and education ==
Christopher Collet was born in New York City.

== Career ==
Collet entered show business during his teens and acquired an agent. His first film role was as Paul in the 1983 horror Sleepaway Camp. Collet remained in touch with his co-star Jonathan Tiersten, and they auditioned together for shows.

Collet landed the role of Neil Oxley in the 1984 CBS after school special Welcome Home, Jellybean. Following this success, Collet landed numerous roles in television and film including Jake Livingston in Firstborn, Richard Jahnke Jr. in the 1985 TV film Right to Kill?, Paul Stephens in the 1986 film The Manhattan Project, and Albert Kaussner in the 1995 Stephen King miniseries The Langoliers.

His television appearances include guest roles on The Hitchhiker (1987), The Equalizer (1988), The Cosby Show (1988), L.A. Law (1991), and MacGyver (1991).

He also starred in several Broadway theatre productions.

During the mid 2000s, Collet pursued some other ventures in the entertainment industry, primarily as a voice director for 4Kids Entertainment. His work primarily involved voice directing for the Sonic the Hedgehog franchise, such as on Sonic X, Sonic and the Black Knight, Sonic Unleashed (in which he was also the voice of SA-55, later called Orbot), and Sonic and the Secret Rings, as well as directing for the 3rd season of the Winx Club, Yu-Gi-Oh and GX.

== Personal life ==
Collet met his wife Nicole Dooley in 1998 when they played husband and wife on an episode of the television series Silk Stalkings. Both are licensed Pilates instructors; they co-own The Pilates Boutique in Brooklyn, New York. They have three children.

== Filmography ==
=== Films ===
Year	Title	Role	Notes
1983	Sleepaway Camp	Paul	
1984	Firstborn	Jake Livingston	
1986	The Manhattan Project	Paul Stephens	
1990	Prayer of the Rollerboys	Gary Lee	
1997	Jungle Emperor Leo	Joe	Voice role
2003	Pokémon: Jirachi, Wish Maker	Candy Salesman	Voice role
2004	Yu-Gi-Oh! The Movie: Pyramid of Light	Additional voices	Voice role
2005	Pokémon: Lucario and the Mystery of Mew	Combusken	Voice role
2008	15 Below Zero	Calvin	Short
2012	The Illusionauts	Additional voices	Voice role
2012	Sleepaway Camp IV: The Survivor	Paul	

=== Television ===
Year	Title	Role	Notes
1984	CBS Schoolbreak Special	Neil Oxley	Episode: Welcome Home, Jellybean; Lies of the Heart
1985	Right to Kill?	Richard Jahnke Jr.	TV movie
1986	Walt Disney's Wonderful World of Color	Benjamin Reed	Episode: Hero in the Family
1987	The Hitchhiker	Jimmy Lee Stoler	Episode: Homebodies
1988	The Equalizer	Danny Winters	Episode: "The Child Broker"
1988	The Cosby Show	Jake Palmer	Episode: The Visit
1988–1989	American Playhouse	David	2 episodes: Pigeon Feathers, Love and Other Sorrows
1989	ABC Afterschool Special	Nickel	Episode: Private Affairs
1991	L.A. Law	Second Lieutenant Robert Braden	Episode: Rest in Pieces
1991	Gabriel's Fire	Moon Man	Episode: One Flew Over the Bird's Nest
1991	MacGyver	Sir Galahad / Groom	2 episodes: Good Knight MacGyver: Part 1 & 2
1991	CBS Schoolbreak Special	Kyle	Episode: Lies of the Heart
1992	The Heights	Paul Brinkman	Episode: The Transformation
1992	O Pioneers!	Amedee	TV movie
1995	The Langoliers	Albert Kaussner	TV mini-series
1995	Central Park West	Zack Wells	Episode: When I Deceive You...
1998	Silk Stalkings	Russ	Episode: Fear and Loathing in Palm Beach
2000–2022	Pokémon	Steven Stone	Recurring voice role, 644 episodes
2001	Yu-Gi-Oh! Duel Monsters	Additional voices	Voice role, 3 episodes
2001–2006	Yu-Gi-Oh!	Additional voices	Voice role, 30 episodes
2002–2003	Ultraman Tiga	Tetsuo Shinjoh	Voice role, 11 episodes
2002	Fighting Cooking Legend Bistro Recipe	Additional voices	Voice role, 6 episodes
2003	Pokémon Chronicles	Kinso	Voice role, Episode: "Kasumi! Get the Blue Badge!!"
2003	Funky Cops	Additional voices	Voice role, 26 episodes
2003–2004	Sonic X	Additional voices	Voice role, 13 episodes
2004	F-Zero GP Legend	Draq	Voice role, Episode: "The Promise"
2004–2006	Yu-Gi-Oh! GX	Additional voices	Voice role, 43 episodes
2005–2006	G.I. Joe: Sigma 6	Additional voices	Voice role, 13 episodes
2006–2009	Viva Piñata	Additional voices	Voice role, 70 episodes
2018	The Purge	Councilman Schmidt	Episode: The Urge to Purge
