= Sleepaway Camp II: Unhappy Campers =

1988 American black comedy slasher film by Michael A. Simpson

- Theatrical release poster
- Directed by: Michael A. Simpson
- Written by: Fritz Gordon
- Based on: Characters by Robert Hiltzik
- Produced by: Jerry Silva; Michael A. Simpson
- Starring: Pamela Springsteen; Renée Estevez
- Cinematography: Bill Mills
- Edited by: John David Allen
- Music by: James Oliverio
- Production company: Double Helix Films
- Distributed by: Double Helix Films
- Release dates: February 28, 1988 (Los Angeles); October 28, 1988 (Atlanta)
- Running time: 80 minutes
- Country: United States
- Language: English
- Budget: $465,000

Sleepaway Camp II: Unhappy Campers (Note: Onscreen title is Sleepaway Camp 2: Unhappy Campers) is a 1988 American comedy slasher film directed by Michael A. Simpson, written by Fritz Gordon, and starring Pamela Springsteen and Renée Estevez. The second installment in the Sleepaway Camp film series, it takes place five years after the events of the original, and features serial killer Angela Baker, working as a counselor, murdering misbehaving teenagers at another summer camp.

Sleepaway Camp II: Unhappy Campers features prominent elements of black comedy and references various horror franchises, such as Friday the 13th, A Nightmare on Elm Street, and The Texas Chainsaw Massacre.

It was followed by a direct sequel, Sleepaway Camp III: Teenage Wasteland (1989), one year later.

== Plot ==
Five years following the events of the first film, Phoebe tells a group of boys at a campfire the story of the murders at Camp Arawak. Her head counselor, Angela Johnson, forces her to go back to the cabin. After the pair gets into an argument, Angela bashes a log over Phoebe’s head and then removes her tongue for having a "filthy mouth".

The next day, campers Molly Nagle, Ally, Mare, Demi, Lea and sisters Brooke and Jodi Shote, question Angela on the whereabouts of Phoebe. She tells them she had to send her home. Later that day, Angela discovers Brooke and Jodi smoking marijuana and drinking alcohol. She initially lets them go only to find them fornicating with a boy named Ralph the next day. Angela chases Ralph off and then burns Jodi to death and pours gasoline over Brooke after she wakes up, before burning her to death as well. That night, the boys start a panty raid, which Angela breaks up. During a jock strap raid against the boys Mare flashes her breasts. Angela decides to drive her home and murders her with an electric drill.

The next night, campers Anthony and Judd try to scare Angela, dressed as Freddy Krueger and Jason Voorhees. The plan backfires when Angela, dressed as Leatherface (wearing Mare's skinned face as a mask), slashes Anthony's throat and murders Judd with a chainsaw. The next day, Angela sets a trap for Ally and forces her down an outhouse latrine pit, drowning her in leeches and human waste. That night, Demi reveals to Angela that she phoned the families of the campers "sent home" and discovered the girls aren't at home. Realizing she could be caught, Angela strangles Demi with a guitar string, before stabbing Lea to death when she finds Demi's body.

The next day, head counselors Uncle John and T.C. fire Angela for "sending too many campers home". Molly and Sean Whitmore go into the woods to cheer her up but the pair discover the bodies of the other campers, before Angela ties them up. After learning the whereabouts of Molly and Sean, T.C. goes after them but Angela throws battery acid in his face, killing him instantly. Sean is decapitated after he realizes Angela is the murderer from the Camp Arawak incident five years earlier. Later, Angela leaves the cabin and Molly frees herself. Upon returning, Molly knocks Angela unconscious, steals her knife and escapes. After an extended chase through the woods, Molly falls onto a rock and is presumed dead. After killing the remaining campers, Angela hitches a ride but the driver quickly annoys her and she kills her. Molly regains consciousness and makes it out of the woods but the truck pulls up behind her. Molly is horrified to learn that Angela is the driver and screams.

== Cast ==
- Pamela Springsteen as Angela Johnson / Angela Baker
- Renée Estevez as Molly Nagle
- Anthony Higgins as Sean Whitmore
- Valerie Hartman as Ally
- Brian Patrick Clarke as T.C.
- Walter Gotell as Uncle John
- Susan Marie Snyder as Mare
- Terry Hobbs as Rob Darrinco
- Kendall Bean as Demi
- Julie Murphy as Lea
- Carol Chambers as Brooke Shote
- Amy Fields as Jodi Shote
- Benji Wilhoite as Anthony
- Walter Franks III as Judd
- Justin Nowell as Charlie
- Heather Binion as Phoebe
- Jason Ehrlich as Emilio
- Carol Martin Vines as Diane
- Tricia Grant as Girl Sent Home
- Jill Jane Clements as Woman in Truck

== Production ==
=== Development and filming ===
Jerry Silva, who had served as a co-producer on Sleepaway Camp, approached Double Helix Films about producing a follow-up to the film. Michael Hitchcock, then a staffer at Double Helix, was assigned to write both Sleepaway Camp II and Sleepaway Camp III: Teenage Wasteland and did so under the pseudonym of Fritz Gordon. Michael A. Simpson, a filmmaker based in Atlanta, Georgia, was hired as director in the fall of 1987 and shot both Sleepaway Camp II and III back-to-back in order to keep the production budgets at $1 million or less. Simpson and Hitchcock felt that the "teen slasher film" genre had become "thematically exhausted" at the time. They decided to push the film into a comedic, self-referential direction, focusing on dark humor. Despite being producers, Stan Wakefield and Silva could not understood or contribute to the production process, leaving the line producing to Simpson. A YMCA youth camp in Waco, Georgia was used for the fictional Camp Rolling Hills. Filming began on September 20 and wrapped on October 9, 1987. Angela's dream sequence was shot to pad out the film to the required 80 minutes.

=== Casting ===
Casting was done in Atlanta (by Shay Griffin), New York City, and Los Angeles. Felissa Rose, who had played Angela Baker in the original, was approached by the producers to reprise her role, but as she was busy with her enrollment at New York University at the time, the role was recast with Pamela Springsteen, the younger sister of rock musician Bruce. Tracy Griffith originally auditioned for the role. Connie Craig appeared as a model for Angela in promotional material, as Springsteen was unavailable for the photoshoot. Amy Fields was originally cast as Brooke Shote, but was unable to play the role due to child labor laws, and was cast as Jodi Shote instead, with Carol Chambers playing the role of Brooke. Other actors and actresses cast for the film included Renée Estevez, Anthony Higgins, Valerie Hartman, Brian Patrick Clarke, Walter Gotell, Susan Marie Snyder, Terry Hobbs, Kendall Bean, Julie Murphy, Benji Wilhoite, Walter Franks III, Justin Nowell, Heather Binion, Jason Ehrlich, Carol Martin Vines, Tricia Grant, and Jill Jane Clements. Most of the teenager characters were named after the Brat Pack. Since some of the actors (like Hobbs and Fields) were underage, representatives of the Georgia Department of Labor were on set to prohibit the actors from being involved in scenes with sex and nudity, present on set during scenes with graphic kills, or using profanity.

=== Special effects ===
The practical and makeup effects were done by Bill "Splat" Johnson, Christina Cobb and Maritza Rodriguez.

=== Music ===
The film's score was composed by James Oliverio. The song "Outta Control" was written and performed by John Altyn. The instruments used included a custom-made guitar (initially intended to be played by Elliot Easton of The Cars), a Rockman digital effects unit, and Slingerland drums (played by Johnny "O" Bellon). Backup vocals were performed by Fred Schreck and John Baker. Altyn played most of the other instruments on the track himself. The song "Desperate To Survive" by Obsession featuring vocalist Mike Vescera can be heard closing out the credits similar to the way that Dokken's "Dream Warriors" song was used in "A Nightmare On Elm St. Pt. 3: Dream Warriors. Sleepaway Camp II was released theatrically on a limited basis. It had its theatrical premiere in Los Angeles on February 28, 1988, where it was reported to receive "rave" reviews from audiences. The film opened regionally in Atlanta on October 28, 1988.

=== Home media ===
The film was released on VHS and Betamax in the United States by Nelson Entertainment in late 1988. The film was released twice on DVD in the United States by Anchor Bay Entertainment: The first release was in 2002 as a single DVD edition, as well as in the Sleepaway Camp Survival Kit.

Scream Factory, under license from MGM, released Sleepaway Camp II and its sequel, Sleepaway Camp III: Teenage Wasteland, for the first time on Blu-ray disc on June 9, 2015. Sandpiper Pictures reissued a Blu-ray edition on December 17, 2024. A 4K UHD Blu-ray limited edition release of the film and its sequel are scheduled for release on August 12, 2025, also by Scream Factory.

In the United Kingdom, the film was released via Futuristic Entertainment, under the title Nightmare Vacation 2. There was over two minutes of scenes cut from the film in order for it to receive an "18" certificate by the BBFC as the film was deemed too violent for an uncut release. This was due to the strict regime of the time when film distribution had to adhere to rules under the Video Recordings Act 1984. The scenes cut were the removal of Phoebe (Heather Binion)'s tongue, a shortened version of Ally (Valerie Hartman) being stabbed in the back, the complete scene where Ally is drowned in the outhouse is removed, and a shortened version of Diane (Carol Martin Vines) being stabbed in the stomach. This version was also released on DVD from 23rd Century Home Entertainment.

Sleepaway Camp II was eventually released completely uncut in the UK for the first time when it was made available as part of the "Sleepaway Camp Trilogy" DVD box set from Anchor Bay Entertainment on May 31, 2004. It was also available in standard case packaging, both of which are now out of print. The film was released on DVD and Blu-ray by 88 Films as part of their "Slasher Classics Collection" in April 2016.

== Reception ==
On the review aggregator website Rotten Tomatoes, 58% of 12 critics' reviews are positive, with an average rating of 4.9/10.

Tim Salmons of The Digital Bits said that "[Blu-ray release of the film] is half of one of the most enjoyable high-definition horror experiences of the year". Brandon Peters of Why So Blu? wrote: "It's unfortunate that the original negative, master what have you has been lost, but I still think the film looks better than it ever has before".

According to William Harrison of DVD Talk, the film is "purposely not scary", adding that "it, instead, ramps up the self-aware humor and ridiculous death scenes".

== Sources ==
- Collum, Jason Paul (2004). Assault of the Killer B's: Interviews with 20 Cult Film Actresses. Jefferson, North Carolina: McFarland & Company. ISBN 978-0-786-41818-3.
- Willis, Donald C. (1997). Horror and Science Fiction Films IV. New York City, New York: Bloomsbury. ISBN 978-0-810-83055-4.
