= Desiree Gould =

American actress (1945–2021)

- Desiree Gould in 2009
- Born: Desiree Joan Gould; March 27, 1945; New York, New York, U.S.
- Died: May 24, 2021 (aged 76); New York, New York, U.S.
- Occupation: Actress
- Years active: 1979–2014 (acting); 1992–2021 (real estate)
- Notable work: Sleepaway Camp (1983)

Desiree Joan Gould (March 27, 1945 – May 24, 2021) was an American actress. She was known for her role as Aunt Martha in the 1983 slasher film Sleepaway Camp.

== Early life ==
Desiree Gould was born on March 27, 1945, in New York City. She was the daughter of a Jewish mother and a Russian-Italian father. When she was five years old, she took singing and tap-dancing classes, later having vocal training with Harry Garland, Roger Leonard, Herb Greene, developing a mezzo-soprano vocal range for musical theater, while she later took lessons in Ballet at the New York Conservatory of Dance, with Pat Doukodovsky, and, the Ballet Academy East, with Don Paradise. This led to her desire to choose acting as a career path, which did not immediately occur, and she spent over twenty years between several different jobs, before deciding to take acting classes, training with the Gene Feist Theatre Foundation, Barbara Loden Actor's Workshop, Paul Mann Actor's Workshop, Warren Robinson, HB Studio, and, Boston Center for the Arts.

== Career ==
=== Acting ===
In the beginning of her acting career, she appeared in commercials and theater productions, and received her first on-screen role at the age of 33, appearing in the 1979 television film You Can't Go Home Again, starring Lee Grant, and based on the 1940 novel of the same name by Thomas Wolfe. She was introduced to casting director Mary Jo Slater, who cast Gould in brief guest roles in television soap operas including One Life to Live, The Edge of Night, and Love of Life.

She is most recognized for her role as Aunt Martha in the 1983 cult classic slasher horror Sleepaway Camp, in which she plays the eccentric aunt of character Angela (Felissa Rose), and mother of Ricky (Jonathan Tiersten). Gould received the part when she was with the agency Marje Fields Talent in Manhattan, and her agent, Dorothy Scott, urged her to audition for the role. She appeared in just two scenes in the film. Gould was contacted in November 2000 to participate in an interview with Sleepawaycampfilms.com, followed by an appearance at the "Sleepaway Camp Reunion" convention in April 2001, as well as a 2008 documentary Return to Sleepaway Camp: Behind the Scenes, and the 2014 documentary At the Waterfront After the Social: The Legacy of Sleepaway Camp.

Despite the success of Sleepaway Camp, Gould decided to refrain from acting for several years in order to become a real estate agent, before making an official return in 2006, when she was cast in Under Surveillance (also known as Dark Chamber), which featured her Sleepaway Camp co-star Felissa Rose. Her more recent credits include a short film titled Caesar and Otto meet Dracula's Lawyer (2010), a guest appearance on the television series Joe Zaso's Cafe Himbo (2011), and a role in the anthology film Tales of Poe (2014).

She also performed as an extra in a number of films including The Switch, Morning Glory, Going the Distance, and Arthur, and the television series, Law & Order, Damages, and Mercy.

In the past, she has served as a member of the Screen Actors Guild (SAG) and American Federation of Television and Radio Artists (AFTRA).

=== Real estate ===
Gould went on to a successful career in real estate for Douglas Elliman in 1992, while still appearing on films in between her real estate career. She left the firm in 2012. Gould worked for Halstead Property real estate from 2013 up until her death. She was licensed to sell property in New York and Florida, and served as a member of The Real Estate Board of New York and The Long Island Board of Realtors.

== Death ==
Gould died on May 24, 2021, at the age of 76, after a year of Parkinson's disease.

== Filmography ==
=== Film ===
| Year | Title | Role | Notes | Ref(s) |
|---|---|---|---|---|
| 1983 | Sleepaway Camp | Aunt Martha Thomas | Also known as Nightmare Vacation | |
| 2006 | Under Surveillance | Norma Besler | Also known as Dark Chamber | |
| 2010 | Caesar and Otto Meet Dracula's Lawyer | Deborah | Short film | |
| 2014 | Tales of Poe | Nurse Malliard | Segment: "The Tell-Tale Heart" | |

=== Television ===
| Year | Title | Role | Notes | Ref(s) |
|---|---|---|---|---|
| 1979 | You Can't Go Home Again | Hooker | Television film | |
| Unknown | One Life to Live | Nurse | Soap opera | |
| Unknown | The Edge of Night | Angelica | Soap opera | |
| 1983 | All My Children | Wedding Party Guest | Soap opera | |
| Unknown | Love of Life | Margo | Soap opera | |
| 2011 | Joe Zaso's Cafe Himbo | Herself | 1 episode | |

== Stage ==
- Bomb Shelter ... as Mary Anne (Nat Horne Theatre, New York City)
- Women of the Wild West ... as Abigail (Nat Horne Theatre, New York City)
- Your Child's Secret Life ... as Arlene (St. Clement's Theatre, New York City)
- The Stronger ... as Miss "Y" (Amelie) (Bristol Valley Playhouse, Naples, New York)
- The Witch ... as Wife (Bristol Valley Playhouse, Naples, New York)
- Queens of France ... as Wife (Marie Sidonie Cressaux) (Bristol Valley Playhouse, Naples, New York)
- The Taming of the Shrew ... as Katherina (Kate) Minola (National Theatre, Boston, Massachusetts)
- A Streetcar Named Desire ... Blanche DuBois (Boston Center for the Arts, Boston, Massachusetts)
