= Welcome Home, Jellybean =

1978 novel by Marlene Fanta Shyer

- First edition
- Author: Marlene Fanta Shyer
- Language: English
- Genre: Realistic fiction
- Publication date: March 17, 1978
- Publication place: United States
- Media type: Print (hardback and paperback)
- ISBN: 978-0-00-330018-5
- OCLC: 12447499

Welcome Home, Jellybean is a 1978 novel written by Marlene Fanta Shyer. It is about a family who brings their mentally challenged teenage daughter Gerri home from an institution and their struggles adjusting. It was made into a CBS Schoolbreak Special in 1984, starring Christopher Collet as Neil Oxley and Dana Hill as Geraldine "Jellybean" Oxley. The novel depicts Neil's life at school and at home, and the difficulties of being a parent of a child with special needs.

== Premise ==
In the book, Neil has to transfer from private to public school when his mother brings his mentally challenged adolescent sister Geraldine home from the institution where she's been living. Neil finds it difficult to cope with Geraldine's disability; their father finds it impossible, and leaves the family when Geraldine causes him to forget an important music composition. Neil misses his dad, but sticks with his mom and sister until Geraldine ruins his big piano recital at school.

To avoid a confrontation with his mother, Neil decides to sneak out in the middle of the night. But he trips over Geraldine, who calls him "Neil" for the first time. Neil realizes that he can't leave Geraldine, and tells his father the same. Neil's dad understands, and says that one day he might come back too, if not in the near future.
