= Sleepaway Camp =

1983 film by Robert Hiltzik

- Theatrical release poster
- Directed by: Robert Hiltzik
- Written by: Robert Hiltzik
- Produced by: Michele Tatosian; Jerry Silva
- Starring: Mike Kellin; Katherine Kamhi; Paul DeAngelo; Jonathan Tiersten; Felissa Rose; Christopher Collet; Karen Fields
- Cinematography: Benjamin Davis
- Edited by: Ron Kalish; Sharyn L. Ross
- Music by: Edward Bilous
- Production company: American Eagle Films
- Distributed by: United Film Distributors
- Release date: November 18, 1983
- Running time: 84 minutes
- Country: United States
- Language: English
- Budget: $335,000–350,000
- Box office: $11 million

Sleepaway Camp is a 1983 American slasher film written and directed by Robert Hiltzik, and starring Mike Kellin (in his final film role), Katherine Kamhi, and Paul DeAngelo, alongside Jonathan Tiersten, Felissa Rose, Karen Fields, Christopher Collet, Desiree Gould, Owen Hughes, and Robert Earl Jones. The original entry in the Sleepaway Camp film series, it focuses on serial killings which occur at a summer camp for teenagers.

Filmed during the fall of 1982 in upstate New York, Sleepaway Camp was released on November 18, 1983, and grossed $11 million on an estimated production budget of $335,000–350,000. The film received negative reviews from critics, many of whom deemed it exploitative and derivative of such films as Friday the 13th (1980).

In the years since its release, Sleepaway Camp has gone on to develop a cult following, a more positive reappraisal from critics, as well as garnering notoriety for its surprise ending, which has been named as one of the most shocking and unforgettable in cinematic history. The film was followed by four sequels: Sleepaway Camp II: Unhappy Campers (1988), Sleepaway Camp III: Teenage Wasteland (1989), Sleepaway Camp IV: The Survivor (1992), and Return to Sleepaway Camp (2008).

== Plot ==
In 1975, John Baker and his boyfriend Lenny take John's children, Angela and Peter, on a boating trip. After the boat capsizes, John and the children try to swim to shore, but they swim into the path of a reckless motorboat and are struck. John and one of the children are killed.

Eight years later, Angela, the surviving child, is traumatized and lives with her eccentric aunt, Dr. Martha Thomas, and cousin Ricky Thomas. Angela and Ricky are sent to Camp Arawak. Angela's introverted nature makes her a target for bullying by fellow camper Judy and camp counselor Meg, but Ronnie Angelo and Susie are kind to her. The head cook, Artie, attempts to sexually assault her, but Ricky intervenes. Later, an unseen figure causes Artie to be severely scalded by boiling water. Artie is rushed to the hospital, and camp owner Mel Kostic dismisses the incident as accidental.

Campers Kenny and Mike mock Angela, prompting Ricky and his friend Paul to confront them. Paul befriends Angela. Later, after Kenny is out at night on the lake and capsizes his canoe, an unseen figure confronts Kenny. Kenny is found the next morning, drowned, and Mel again rules the death an accident. Paul asks Angela to go to the movies with him and kisses her. Campers Billy and Jimmy throw a water balloon at Angela, then Billy is killed when someone traps him in a public toilet with a beehive, exploiting his allergy. Mel begins to suspect a killer is at the camp.

Tensions rise as Angela and Paul's relationship becomes strained. When Paul kisses her again, she has a flashback to witnessing her father in bed with Lenny. Judy seduces Paul, and Angela finds them kissing. Paul tries to explain, but Judy goads Meg into carrying Angela to the pier and throwing her into the water. Mel stops Ricky from helping by holding him by the arms while accusing Ricky of harming campers to protect Angela; Ronnie intervenes. While Ricky helps Angela out of the water and back to the beach, four small children throw sand at Angela. Ricky comforts her and swears revenge. Right after dinner, Meg's back is split open during her shower in one of the vacated cabins, killing her.

During the camp social, Paul apologizes to Angela, and she tells him to meet her by the water. Meanwhile, Mel discovers Meg's body, and camp counselor Eddie finds the bodies of the four children who threw sand at Angela, brutally murdered in their sleeping bags. Soon after, Judy is killed by being vaginally penetrated with a hot electric curling iron. Panic spreads through the camp. Believing that Ricky is the killer, Mel beats him unconscious, then runs into the woods, encountering the real assailant. Horrified, Mel seemingly recognizes the attacker before being killed by an arrow to the throat. Police begin searching for missing campers. Paul is on the beach with Angela, who suggests they go for a swim, while Officer Frank Breton finds Ricky unconscious but alive.

Ronnie and Susie discover a naked Angela humming and clutching a hunting knife alongside Paul's severed head. They are shocked to realize that "Angela" is actually a boy. It is then revealed that Angela is actually her presumed-dead brother Peter. The real Angela had died in the boating accident, while Peter was the survivor. After Martha had gained custody of him, she decided to raise Peter as "Angela", the girl she had always wanted, which mentally affected him. The nude, blood-covered Angela/Peter stands before the horrified Susie and Ronnie, hissing and growling.

== Cast ==
- Felissa Rose as Angela Baker / Peter Baker
  - Frank Sorrentino as Young Peter Baker
  - Colette Lee Corcoran as Young Angela Baker
- Jonathan Tiersten as Ricky Thomas
- Karen Fields as Judy L. Beck
- Christopher Collet as Paul Collins
- Mike Kellin as Mel Kostic
- Katherine Kamhi as Meg Kameron
- Paul DeAngelo as Ronnie Angelo
- Susan Glaze as Susie Armstrong
- Loris Sallahian as Billy Island
- Amy Baio as Brooke Warner
- Tom Van Dell as Mike Bell
- John E. Dunn as Kenny Benn
- Ethan Larosa as Jimmy
- Willy Kuskin as Mozart Gal
- Desiree Gould as Aunt Martha Thomas
- Owen Hughes as Artie O'Conner
- Robert Earl Jones as Ben Joanes
- Frank Trent Saladino as Gene Cimaroli
- Rick Edrich as Jeff DeMarco
- Fred Greene as Eddie Jefferson
- Allen Breton as Officer Frank Breton
- Lisa Buckler as Leslie Lori
- Michael Mahon as Hal Huzzello
- Dan Tursi as John Baker
- James Paradise as Lenny Whinnery
- Paul Poland as Craig Willys
- Alyson Mord as Maryanne Curtis
- Carol Robinson Alexander as Dolores

== Production ==
=== Development ===
Writer-director Robert Hiltzik, a New York University film school graduate, began developing the idea for Sleepaway Camp in the 1970s. He was inspired by his own experiences attending Camp Algonquin in Argyle, New York as a child. He was also inspired to make the film following the success of Friday the 13th, though he has denied that the film was a direct inspiration on the screenplay.

Hiltzik privately raised funding for the film through friends, family, and other "connections," eventually amassing a budget of $335,000 to make the film.

=== Casting ===
Unlike many of its contemporaries, which had adults portraying youth, the cast of Sleepaway Camp was primarily made up of adolescent actors. During casting for the role of Angela Baker, actresses were asked to stare wide-eyed into the camera while pretending to eat a chocolate bar. Felissa Rose was cast in her debut role as the character, and was paid only $5,000 for her performance. Rose wore a bra to appear flat-chested. She made friends with all the kids on set. Frank Sorrentino was cast as the young Peter Baker at the beginning of the film. Dan Tursi, who played John Baker, was one of Hiltzik's classmates at New York University Tisch School of the Arts, where he appeared in three of Hiltzik's short films. When auditioning for the role of Ricky Thomas, Jonathan Tiersten was asked by Hiltzik to curse him out, and thus was given the role. Both he and Rose initially did not get along, so they were taken bowling in order to bond with each other. They developed a romance during filming, but broke up soon after.

Jane Krakowski was initially cast as Judy, but turned down the role upon learning of the character's death, and was replaced with Karen Fields. Fields improvised her performance, finding it fun to play a "bad girl" character. Christopher Collet was cast as Paul. Katherine Kamhi and Thomas E. van Dell, who played Meg and Mike, dated during production. Kamhi also became close with Rose and Fields. When filming the skinny dipping scene, Loris Sallahian, who played Billy, was displeased with the conditions and walked off the set, but returned after a personal chat with Hiltzik. John E. Dunn and Lisa Buckler were cast as Kenny and Leslie, respectively; during filming of the scene in which the canoe flips over in the lake, Dunn cut the top of his hand open and had to be rushed to hospital. Producer Michele Tatosian filled in for Buckler in the shot where Leslie swims away, as Buckler had gotten infectious mononucleosis and was sick.

Desiree Gould was with the agency Marje Fields Talent in Manhattan, and was urged to audition for the role of Aunt Martha by her agent, Dorothy Scott. She appeared in only two scenes in the film, initially wanting to leave as she found Martha's dialogue too bizarre to say with a straight face. Hiltzik sought Mike Kellin to portray camp owner Mel Kostic, and managed to track him down to his home in Nyack, New York, after Kellin's agent initially rejected the screenplay. Tatosian managed to contact Kellin via phone, and convinced him to take the role. Kellin was ill with lung cancer during filming, and died on August 26, 1983, three months prior to the film's release.

The cast and crew's relatives and some local kids played some of the campers leaving the buses near the beginning of the film. Willy Kuskin, who played Mozart, was genuinely bullied by the other kids during filming. Frank Trent Saladino, who played Gene, had to intervene and protect him. The Glens Falls Police Department lent one of their uniforms to Allen Breton for his role as Officer Frank Breton. At one point, Breton shaved off his mustache during filming for another acting job, and had to wear a fake one for the film's remaining scenes.

=== Filming ===
Principal photography of Sleepaway Camp took place at Camp Algonquin (which Hiltzik attended himself as a child) in Argyle, New York. Filming began in September 1982 and lasted five weeks. Hiltzik dedicated the film to his mother, who died in a car accident before production began. The film had been storyboarded but after the first day of filming, the film was already behind schedule. The storyboards could not be used and were thrown out. The trees, with their leaves turning, belie the summer setting of the film.

Several crew members, including costume designer Eileen Sieff and mechanical effects technician Ed Fountain, were hired by production manager Carl Clifford; Clifford, Fountain and Sieff had previously worked on George A. Romero's Creepshow (1982).

=== Special effects ===
The practical and makeup effects were done by Ed French, Diane Lawrence, and Suzen Poshek. Jonathan Tiersten performed Angela's killing scenes since Felissa Rose's contract stated that she would not do the killings on-screen due to her young age. A lifecast of John E. Dunn was used for Kenny's death scene. The effects used for Billy's death were achieved using a dummy with sugar mixture on its face to attract the bees.

For the scene in which "Angela" is revealed to be Peter Baker, Rose was originally going to wear a prosthetic penis. A local college student was paid $200 to fill in for Rose, and had to be drunk before filming the scene. He shaved his body and stood naked on the waterfront, wearing a mask of Angela's face. The mask, designed by French, featured glass eyes and was crafted out of dental acrylic.

== Music ==
Hiltzik wanted an orchestral score for the film to differentiate it from other slasher films in the 1980s, which used synthesized scores. He met Edward Bilous in a coffee shop, who was writing sheet music. Bilous wrote and composed the film's instrumental score. The songs "Angela's Theme" (which plays over the end credits), "Tonight You're Mine" and "Take a Chance" were written and performed by Frankie Vinci, imitating David Bowie. They were recorded using a 4-track Teac cassette recorder, a Fender Stratocaster electric guitar, a Yamaha keyboard, and a Boss drum machine.

== Release ==
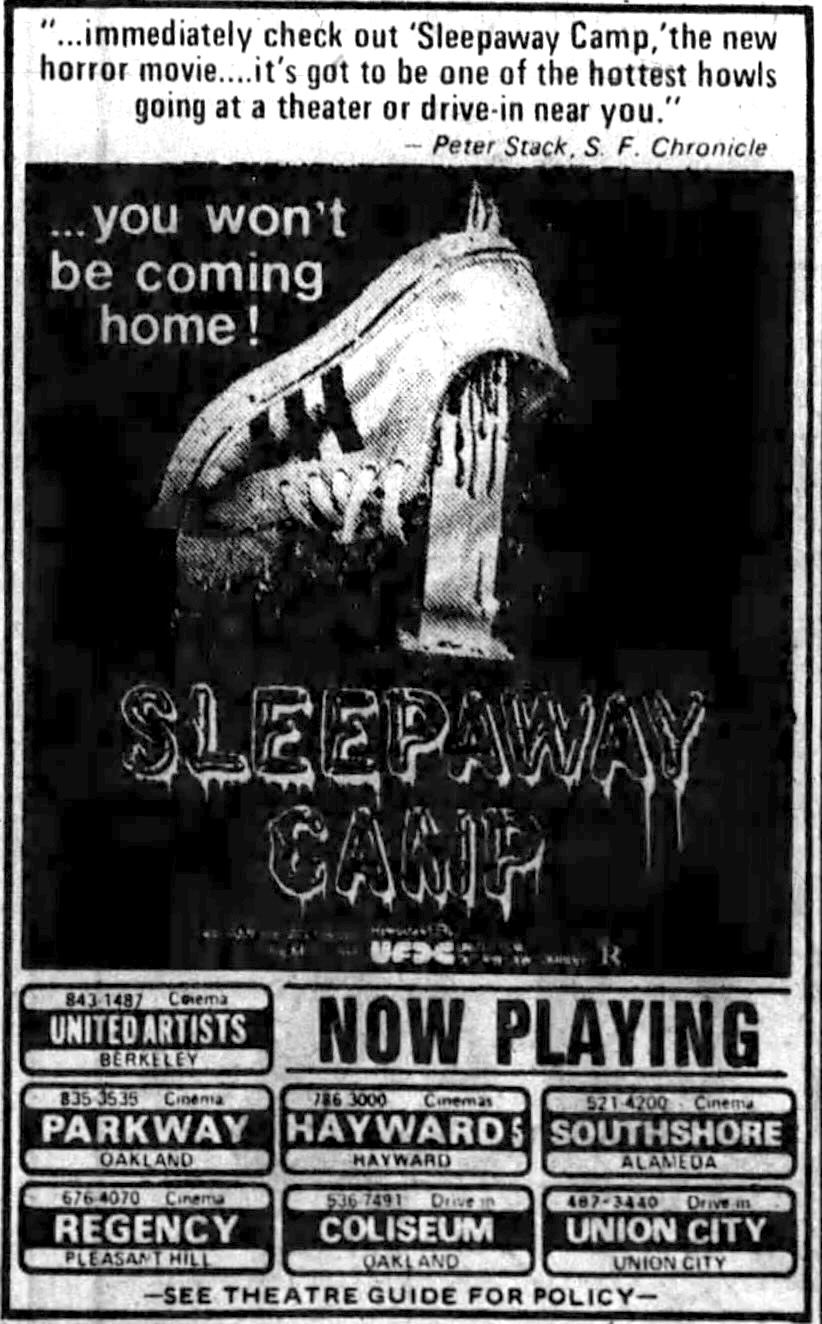
Newspaper advertisement in the Oakland Tribune, March 1984

Hiltzik initially shopped the film to Paramount Pictures and Troma Entertainment before securing a distribution deal with United Film Distributors, an independent company based on Long Island. Hiltzik stated that United Film Distributors offered the benefit of owning numerous theaters nationwide who could screen the film, as well as handling local advertising on MTV.

Sleepaway Camp premiered in New York City on November 18, 1983. It was next released in Florida on January 27, 1984, with screenings beginning in Bradenton, Miami, and West Palm Beach. Screenings began in Texas on February 10, 1984, including in Austin, Fort Worth, and Houston.

The film opened in the San Francisco Bay Area on March 23, 1984, followed by a Los Angeles release on May 25, 1984. It was released regionally in other markets in the fall of 1984, with a Cincinnati, Ohio release beginning September 7, 1984.

=== Home media ===
In the United Kingdom, the film was released on VHS by CBS/Fox Video under the alternative title Nightmare Vacation in the spring of 1984.

In the United States, Anchor Bay Entertainment released Sleepaway Camp on DVD on August 8, 2000. Anchor Bay reissued this disc as part of a four-disc set titled the Sleepaway Camp Survival Kit on August 20, 2002, which also contained the film's two sequels, as well as a bonus disc featuring footage from the unfinished third sequel. This boxed set, which featured a medical red cross on the front cover, was discontinued in late 2002 after the Red Cross filed a complaint against Anchor Bay, which subsequently redesigned the box art to remove the cross logo. In 2005, the Canadian-based Legacy Entertainment released a region-free budget DVD release of the film. Unlike the original VHS release, this release contains numerous edits to the film to either shorten violence or certain moments like dialogue.

Scream Factory released the film in a collector's edition Blu-ray set on May 27, 2014. This release contains a 2K scan of the original camera negative, and this release also has the film in its original uncut version, unlike the DVD released by Anchor Bay.

== Reception ==
=== Box office ===
Upon its New York City release over the Thanksgiving week in 1983, Sleepaway Camp grossed $430,000 from 85 theaters. The film earned $90,000 during its opening weekend in Los Angeles in May 1984, screening at 15 theaters. By June 10, 1984, the film ranked among the top-twenty highest-grossing films at the U.S. box office that week. By the end of its theatrical run, it had gone on to gross a total of $11 million.

=== Critical response ===
==== Contemporary ====
Upon its original release, the film was frequently compared to Friday the 13th due to their shared settings and whodunit plot structure. A review in The Courier-Journal characterized the film as a "low-budget slasher in the Friday the 13th mold, with teen-age mayhem at a summer camp", while Rick Lyman of The Philadelphia Inquirer uniformly lambasted the film, criticizing its performances, writing, and twist ending. Linda Gross of the Los Angeles Times felt the film was derivative and gruesome, but conceded that its pacing was adept and that director Hiltzik portrayed the often cruel and abusive behavior of teenagers towards another young person.

In the Chula Vista Star-News's review, the film was deemed "a tasteless picture about mysterious murders at a summer youth camp that obscenely blends beheadings, stabbings, pubescent impulses, homosexuality, and transvestism" with a cast of junior-high-school actors. George Williams of The Sacramento Bee made similar criticisms of the acting, and described the film as "mindless" and "dirty". Paul Willistein of The Morning Call described the film as "simply horrible", writing that its campy sensibility is unsuccessful as it is "intended to be a bonafide horror film".

The News-Press gave it a favorable review, calling it "a shockingly good slasher film, if you use the relatively fine, first Friday the 13th as a measuring stick... it's just another crazed killer stalking nubile summer campers. But, this time, there are some truly creative killings and interesting plot twists". The San Francisco Chronicle's Peter Stack also praised the film as a "great scuzz movie from top to bottom" and a "little masterpiece of hostility comedy," noting that "there's not one likable character, a factor that should serve as an excellent release valve for all the people who absolutely hate teenagers." Richard Martin, writing for the Ottawa Citizen, found the film's screenplay underdeveloped and lacking suspense, but praised its conclusion as effective and frightening, noting: "The very last image of Sleepaway Camp is so shocking and deeply disturbing it's given me goosebumps every time I recall it."

==== Modern assessment ====
In the years since its release, Sleepaway Camp has developed a cult following and garnered critical reappraisal. Its twist ending has been distinguished by audiences and critics as one of the most shocking in the slasher genre's history, as well as in cinema history in general.

On the review aggregator website Rotten Tomatoes, 82% of 28 critics' reviews are positive, with an average rating of 6.5/10. The website's consensus reads: "Sleepaway Camp is a standard teen slasher elevated by occasional moments of John Waters-esque weirdness and a twisted ending." On Metacritic, the film was reviewed by four critics and got a rank of 58 out of a 100, which indicates "mixed or average reviews".

The website Bloody Disgusting gave the film a positive review, praising Felissa Rose's performance and the film's twist ending calling it "one of the most shocking seen since, possibly, Hitchcock's Psycho". AllMovie wrote in its review on the film: "While most of the gender-bending story's sexual confusion is ultimately half-baked... Sleepaway Camp is distinctive enough to warrant required viewing for genre enthusiasts".

Film scholar Bartłomiej Paszylk called the film "an exceptionally bad movie but a very good slasher". Commenting on the performances in the film, film scholar Thomas Sipos wrote that "[the film] feels odd due to its contrasting acting styles. Most of the cast performs in a naturalistic manner, whereas Desiree Gould's performance as Aunt Martha is strikingly stylistic: broadly overplayed to the point of caricature".

In his book The Pleasure and Pain of Cult Horror Films: A Historical Survey (2009), Paszylk characterized Sleepaway Camp as "elevat[ing] the kids to the position of the movie's mass protagonist and becomes a tricky metaphor of the unspeakable pains and anxieties of growing up". He further commented on the film's conclusion: "The epiphanous ending brings Sleepaway Camp further away from the likes of Friday the 13th and closer to such 1980s 'slashers with a twist' as Happy Birthday to Me (1981) and April Fool's Day (1986), but Hiltzik's movie goes even further than that: in this case the denouement doesn't just add a new dimension to everything we saw up to this point, but it pushes its way deep into our minds and stays with us forever".

The film was featured on episode 48 of the podcast How Did This Get Made? where hosts Paul Scheer, Jason Mantzoukas, June Diane Raphael, and guest host Zack Pearlman struggled to decipher the film's opening moments, due to the ambiguous relationships established at the beginning of the film. Scheer later recalled that it had been the most fan-requested film "by a landslide".

==== Criticism ====
Sleepaway Camp has garnered contemporary criticism for its representation of a transgender villain. Willow Maclay, a transgender writer for Cléo magazine, criticized the film for its "equation of mental instability with having grown up in a gender role not concurrent with your identity. Nearly every single transgender person grows up being raised in a gender role that does not fit, and that doesn't mean that they are mentally ill or seriously violent". BJ Colangelo, in an editorial for Dread Central, similarly felt the film had transphobic and homophobic implications due to its representation of Angela (Rose) and Angela's gay father John Baker (Dan Tursi), but conceded that the film has metaphorical merit for showing the unfavorable and violent consequences for a character who is forced into gender roles that do not align with their identity.

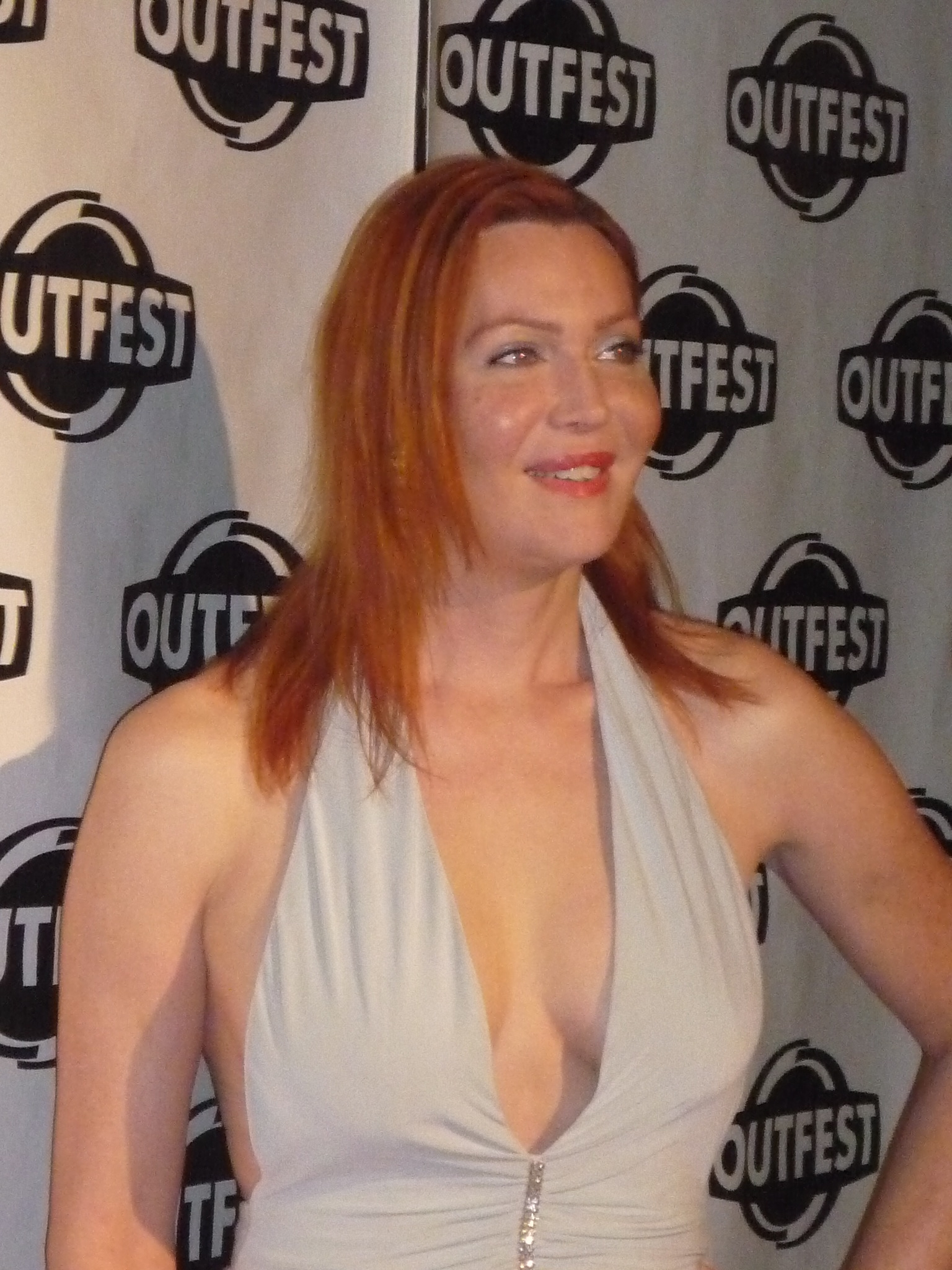
Transgender activist Calpernia Addams argues that the character of Angela is not actually transgender, but has been forced to live as a girl despite being designated as a male.

Calpernia Addams, a transgender author and activist, commented in a 2021 interview with Fangoria that the character of Angela "is not even really trans... This whole situation with Angela is a child who was forced into this quote-unquote transition". She compared the character to David Reimer, a Canadian man who, as a child, was forced by his parents to live as a girl following a botched circumcision. Addams further stated that the film should be assessed in the context of the period in which it was made: "I would just say that I enjoy Sleepaway Camp for what it is, which is schlocky '80s horror with a unique twist ending. And I think it's the worst possible portrayal of a supposedly trans storyline, à la Buffalo Bill, or Dressed to Kill, or any of those types of films. But at the same time, I don't want it censored or canceled. And if you just sit back and let yourself, it can be an enjoyable watch".

Transgender writer Alice Collins of Bloody Disgusting said that Sleepaway Camp "is steeped in queerness, especially when compared to its contemporaries. In its day it took a deeper look into the subject matter than that of other films. Angela and Peter's dad is a closeted gay man, there's forced gender bending (which is abuse rather than queer but people will see it as such), and the majority of the scantily clad people in the film are men with all those very short shorts that leave little to the imagination while there is little skin shown of the feminine variety". Collins argues that Angela is a transgender girl, noting that, in the film's sequels, Angela is retconned as a woman who uses feminine pronouns: "So despite Aunt Martha being insane, she just happened to stumble upon a person who was already a girl; and it was an accident that her brainwashing worked".

Actress Felissa Rose defended the film in a 2023 interview: "I absolutely don't feel like it's transphobic. I feel as though Angela was a typical adolescent trying to find her gender identification and sexual orientation and I thought that was extremely exciting for 1982. It was ahead of its time. You can see with her father and his lover as well as her relationship with Paul [her camp crush], who she was trying to understand her relationship with, I feel like it was an adolescent story of a young person coming of age".

== Franchise ==
=== Sequels ===
In the late 1980s, Hiltzik sold the rights to the successive Sleepaway Camp films, after which Michael A. Simpson directed two sequels, Sleepaway Camp II: Unhappy Campers (1988) and Sleepaway Camp III: Teenage Wasteland (1989). In them, Angela (now played by Bruce Springsteen's younger sister, Pamela Springsteen) resurfaces at a nearby summer camp, but this time masquerading as a counselor after a sex reassignment surgery. Much like at the previous camp, she gleefully tortures and kills anyone who misbehaves or annoys her. These films had more of a satirical comic tone than the original.

Another sequel, Sleepaway Camp IV: The Survivor, directed by Jim Markovic, was partially filmed in the early 1990s but left incomplete. In 2002, the unfinished footage was released and made available as an exclusive fourth disc in Anchor Bay/Starz Entertainment's Sleepaway Camp DVD boxed set. In 2012, the film was completed using archival footage from the first three films and released on DVD and Amazon Video on Demand.

A fifth film, Return to Sleepaway Camp, was completed in 2003 and initially struggled to have its visual effects completed. It was directed by Robert Hiltzik, the director of the original 1983 film. According to Fangoria, the digital effects were redone from 2006 to 2008. The film was released in 2008.

=== Unofficial sequel ===
Karen Fields reprised her role of Judy from Sleepaway Camp in the 2014 short film Judy, although it wasn't technically a sequel. The Jeff Hayes-directed film was included in the collector's edition Blu-ray release of the original Sleepaway Camp.

=== Proposed remake ===
The purportedly final film in the Sleepaway Camp series, titled Sleepaway Camp Reunion, was also announced to be in the works. Distribution had been arranged via Magnolia Pictures. Creator Robert Hiltzik, who recovered the rights to the franchise, has stated that he would make the film if his budget was met. However, Hiltzik and Return To Sleepaway Camp producer Jeff Hayes later announced themselves as having started work on a reboot that would retain the key characters and elements of the original film with additional storyline elements and a dose of modernizing. As of Summer 2014, Hiltzik was reportedly tweaking the script. In addition, Michael Simpson, the director of Sleepaway Camp II: Unhappy Campers and Sleepaway Camp III: Teenage Wasteland, wrote a script for an additional film called Sleepaway Camp: Berserk.

By December 2020, another Sleepaway Camp installment was announced to be in development, starring Felissa Rose.

In September 2025, it was announced that Kenan Thompson's production company Artists for Artists (AFA) has acquired the rights to remake Sleepaway Camp with original writer/director Robert Hiltzik.

== Sources ==
- Collum, Jason Paul (2004). Assault of the Killer B's: Interviews with 20 Cult Film Actresses. Jefferson, North Carolina: McFarland & Company. ISBN 978-0-786-41818-3.
- Hafdahl, Meg; Florence, Kelly (2020). The Science of Women in Horror: The Special Effects, Stunts, and True Stories Behind Your Favorite Fright Films. New York City, New York: Simon and Schuster. ISBN 978-1-510-75176-7.
- Harper, Jim (2004). Legacy of Blood: A Comprehensive Guide to Slasher Movies. Manchester: Critical Vision. ISBN 978-1-900-48639-2. OCLC 475680187.
- Hayes, Jeff (2023). Sleepaway Camp: Making the Movie and Reigniting the Campfire. Cleveland, Ohio: 1984 Publishing. ISBN 978-1-948-22128-3.
- Paszylk, Bartłomiej (2009). The Pleasure and Pain of Cult Horror Films: An Historical Survey. Jefferson, North Carolina: McFarland. ISBN 978-0-786-43695-8. OCLC 956654338.
- Sipos, Thomas M. (2010). Horror Film Aesthetics: Creating the Visual Language of Fear. Jefferson, North Carolina: McFarland & Company. ISBN 978-0-786-45834-9. OCLC 607320273.
- Stine, Scott Aaron (2003). The Gorehound's Guide to Splatter Films of the 1980s. Jefferson, North Carolina: McFarland. ISBN 978-1-476-61132-7. OCLC 606990002.
- Sumner, Don (2010). Horror Movie Freak. Iola, Wisconsin: Krause Publications. ISBN 978-1-440-21563-6. OCLC 775361341.
