= Firstborn (1984 film) =

1984 film by Michael Apted

- Theatrical release poster
- Directed by: Michael Apted
- Written by: Ron Koslow
- Produced by: Paul Junger Witt; Tony Thomas
- Starring: Teri Garr; Peter Weller; Christopher Collet
- Cinematography: Ralf D. Bode
- Edited by: Arthur Schmidt
- Music by: Michael Small
- Distributed by: Paramount Pictures
- Release date: October 26, 1984
- Running time: 100 minutes
- Country: United States
- Language: English
- Budget: $8 million
- Box office: $6.3 million

Firstborn (titled Moving In in Europe) is a 1984 American drama film starring Teri Garr, Peter Weller, Corey Haim, Sarah Jessica Parker, Robert Downey Jr., and Christopher Collet. It was filmed in New Jersey and New York State. Firstborn centers on teenager Jake Livingston (played by Collett), whose home life is thrown into disarray when his mother's ne'er-do-well boyfriend moves in and pulls her into his dissolute lifestyle. It was released on DVD and Blu-ray on July 31, 2012.

== Plot summary ==
Sixteen-year-old Jake Livingston's parents divorced two years earlier, and his mother Wendy has been dating other men, but she remains deeply in love with her ex-husband. When she learns he is remarrying, she sleeps with a man she met the same day, Sam, on the rebound. Jake and his preadolescent brother Brian are disturbed by this, but as Sam begins dating Wendy, they are won over by Sam's ingratiating manner and his gifting them both dirt bikes.

Jake's concerns are aroused when Sam announces vague plans to open a restaurant, just days after he told Jake that he was planning to start a security business. He is alarmed when Sam, having been booted from his apartment, moves into the Livingston house, something Wendy never allowed with any of her previous boyfriends, some of whom she dated far longer than Sam. As Jake and Brian assume a hostile attitude towards Sam, Sam begins physically abusing them. The atmosphere at home causes Jake's relationships with his friends and girlfriend to deteriorate and Brian to repeatedly get into fights at school.

Without warning, Sam and Wendy disappear from the house for some days, leaving only a note that they are on a trip to a lake. While they are gone, Jake snoops into Wendy and Sam's bedroom and finds an assortment of illegal drugs. The next day he comes home to find a stranger looking for Sam and realizes Sam and Wendy left because they are ducking Sam's associates in the drug trade after a deal went sour. When they return, Jake confirms that Sam has introduced Wendy to cocaine use.

Wendy cannot see beyond Sam's charms or her own emotional needs. When Jake confronts her, she denies her drug addiction, insists upon the fantasy that they are going to open a restaurant, and says she cannot tell Sam to leave. As Wendy's mental state continues to deteriorate, Jake is forced to take on the parental roles in the household, including picking Brian up when he ends up in the principal's office. Jake and Brian's father still cares about them and Wendy, but his work is keeping him overseas for the near future, so Jake opts to hide their problems from him, and he cannot tell anyone else for fear of Wendy being imprisoned for her part in Sam's drug dealing. Brian wants them to run away from home, but Jake is unwilling to abandon their mother.

A confrontation with his bullying teacher makes Jake realize he has the courage to stand up to Sam. When Sam gets a fresh supply of cocaine to go forward with his drug deal, Jake steals it and hides it in an abandoned building. He then gives Sam an ultimatum: leave their home, or he will tell the police about the cocaine. Sam is not intimidated, believing Jake would never do anything that would lead his mother to be arrested, and threatens to start beating Wendy if Jake does not tell him where the cocaine is. Jake gives in, and they retrieve the cocaine. When they get back to the house, Wendy demands Sam leave. Sam refuses, and a fistfight ensues, with Jake, Wendy, and Brian all rallying against Sam. Jake tells a battered Sam to leave, threatening to kill him if he ever comes back. Sam takes his things and leaves as the family embrace each other.

== Cast ==
- Teri Garr as Wendy Livingston
- Peter Weller as Sam
- Christopher Collet as Jake Livingston
- Corey Haim as Brian Livingston
- Sarah Jessica Parker as Lisa
- Robert Downey Jr. as Lee
- Christopher Gartin as Adam
- Richard Brandon as Dad
- James Harper as Mr. Rader

== Reception ==
Firstborn received mixed reviews from critics. On Rotten Tomatoes, the film holds a rating of 40% from 15 reviews.

Roger Ebert of the Chicago Sun-Times gave the film two stars out of a possible four. He wrote how Firstborn started with promise due to good performances and realistic dialogue, but he "felt cheated" by the action film cliches in the climactic scenes because they did not address the serious issues the film raised.
