= The Manhattan Project (film) =

1986 thriller film by Marshall Brickman

- Theatrical release poster
- Directed by: Marshall Brickman
- Written by: Thomas Baum; Marshall Brickman
- Produced by: Marshall Brickman; Jennifer Ogden
- Starring: John Lithgow; Christopher Collet; Cynthia Nixon
- Cinematography: Billy Williams
- Edited by: Nina Feinberg
- Music by: Philippe Sarde
- Production company: Gladden Entertainment
- Distributed by: 20th Century Fox
- Release date: June 13, 1986
- Running time: 117 minutes
- Country: United States
- Language: English
- Budget: $18 million
- Box office: $3.9 million (US)

The Manhattan Project is a 1986 American science fiction thriller film. Named after the World War II-era program that constructed the first atomic bombs, the plot revolves around a gifted high school student who decides to construct an atomic bomb for a national science fair. It was directed by Marshall Brickman, based upon his screenplay co-written with Thomas Baum, and starred Christopher Collet, John Lithgow, John Mahoney, Jill Eikenberry and Cynthia Nixon. This film – a box-office bomb whose ticket sales recovered just 21 percent of its budget – was the first from the short-lived Gladden Entertainment.

The film's director and screenplay co-writer Marshall Brickman had established his career as a co-writer on several Woody Allen films. The Manhattan Project was his third film as director, following the comedies Simon (1980) and Lovesick (1983).

== Plot ==
Dr. John Mathewson discovers a new process for refining plutonium to purities greater than 99.997 percent. The United States government provides him a laboratory located in Ithaca, New York, masked as a medical company. John moves to Ithaca and meets real estate agent Elizabeth Stephens while searching for an apartment. He attempts to win the affections of the single mother by inviting her teenage son Paul to take a tour of the lab. John is confident in the lab's cover story but Paul, an unusually gifted student with a passion for science, becomes suspicious when he discovers a statistically impossible patch of five-leaf clover on the grounds.

Paul and his aspiring journalist girlfriend, Jenny Anderman, decide to expose the weapons factory to the media, stealing a container of plutonium as evidence. Once they succeed, Paul declares that the plutonium alone is insufficient, as no-one would be impressed by two kids stealing something from a lab. Instead, he convinces Jenny he can create the world's first privately built nuclear device, exposing the lab to the world by audaciously entering it into the New York Science Fair. After convincing his mother and his school that his project is about hamsters bred in darkness, he begins research and construction of the bomb.

The lab discovers that a container of plutonium has been replaced by a bottle of shampoo mixed with glitter. A military investigation team, led by Lt. Colonel Conroy, arrives on the scene and determines that Paul is responsible for stealing the plutonium. Suspecting him of terrorist intent, the investigators search Paul's home and discover that he and Jenny have left for the science fair.

After the agents capture the couple in New York City, John, who feels personally responsible for the crisis, talks privately with Paul and persuades him to give the bomb to the agents before a group of other participants at the science fair help Paul and Jenny escape from the hotel.

In an effort to expose the lab, Paul hatches a plan to return the bomb on his own terms. Ensuring Jenny is a safe distance away, he calls the agents from a pay phone and walks into the lab with the bomb while being surrounded by snipers and agents. During the standoff, negotiations stall and Paul arms the bomb. John, convinced that Paul is not an actual terrorist, attempts to intercede on his behalf.

Due to radiation from the plutonium, the bomb's timer activates on its own and begins to count down with increasing speed. Paul suggests taking the bomb to a quarry outside of town, but John admits that he had not fully understood the ramifications of his plutonium refining process. As a result, Paul's bomb will have a nuclear blast yield nearly five times larger than the one that destroyed Hiroshima if it detonates.

Desperate to defuse the bomb, all sides put down their weapons and frantically work as a team to dismantle it. They manage to disarm the bomb a fraction of a second before it explodes. After a brief moment of relief, Conroy decides to arrest Paul. John refuses to cooperate and opens the door to the lab, revealing a large crowd, including Jenny and the press. The film ends with Paul freely departing the scene.

== Cast ==
- Christopher Collet as Paul Stephens
- John Lithgow as Dr. John Mathewson
- John Mahoney as Lieutenant Colonel Conroy
- Jill Eikenberry as Elizabeth Stephens
- Cynthia Nixon as Jenny Anderman
- Robert Sean Leonard (credited as Robert Leonard) as Max
- Timothy Carhart as Relief Guard
- Richard Jenkins as Miles, the radiation controls officer
- Gregg Edelman as Science Teacher

== Production ==
After making Lovesick, Brickman was interested in doing something other than comedy.

"Jokes are easy," he said. "Humor comes to me so easily I'm suspicious of it. I secrete jokes like the pancreas secretes...whatever the pancreas secretes. I wanted character, I wanted to go for the emotions that the kid feels, that the scientist feels; I wanted the audience to feel the seductiveness of machinery."

He chose the Manhattan Project. However he decided against doing something historical because "It's such a monster to do, the scope is so enormous – I couldn't come up with a viable way to make it that wouldn't cost under $60 million to produce." He instead decided to do something in a contemporary setting which dealt with the same themes.

"I became fascinated with the two worlds that coexist in America now," he says. "The one world of ordinary citizens, like the kid in the movie who has all the concommitant problems of adolescence – sex and girls and school and then the other world, which is the world of the military–industrial complex, and within that world the sort of high-priesthood of nuclear-weapons planners and designers. You read through the books and these guys are really creepy: scary and fascinating, and very brilliant and very elitist and very condescending to the rest of the world. And very divorced from any sense of consequence, from any sense of ethics or morality."

He also thought "it might be a good idea to approach the bomb as another consumer item, which in a sense it is. You know, it provides a lot of jobs, a lot of work, and ironically a lot of good side-effects."

Brickman later said he was inspired by an article he read in Scientific American on laser separation of transuranic elements. He developed the structure with collaborator Thomas Baum.

The plot was likely influenced by the case of John Aristotle Phillips, a Princeton University undergraduate, who came to prominence in 1977 as the "A-Bomb Kid" for designing a nuclear weapon in a term paper using publicly available books and articles.

"I was afraid people would say I ripped off the subject," Brickman said. "That I trivialized it, that I took a less serious view – that I just used the subject to get some laughs."

Brickman was inspired by meeting a former atomic scientist who made windmills and greenhouses. He asked the scientist why he did, and he said "Well, you're sitting in your office and if it works, then you're creating temperatures and pressures that existed only during the creation of the universe. For a millionth of a second, you get to play God. And you can't just walk away from that."

Brickman says he wanted to "show that the kid, just like the scientists, is seduced by the technology. It's like a form of chicken: How close can I come to the edge here? I wanted to show how you could get embroiled without any regard to consequences. Which is what happened to the guys involved in the original Manhattan Project. They became hooked; they were just too far into it."

John Lithgow said the film was "a change of pace" for him. "The script appealed to me, and the subject matter was intriguing, too. It's a cut above the teenage science movies that have been filling the theaters this summer."

$13 million of the budget – the actual cost of making the movie – was provided by Thorn-EMI Screen Entertainment. The rest of the budget consisted of consultancy fees for Gladden, that went to Gladden's controversial founder and chairman, David Begelman.

=== Filming ===
The Manhattan Project was filmed in and around New York City, including Rockland County, the village of Suffern (including Suffern High School) and the INCO, Ltd. Research and Development Center in the hamlet of Sterling Forest.

The producers held an actual science fair at the New York Penta Hotel, paying $75 each to actual students from the tri-state area who participated in the science fair and contributed their own individually created projects. The nuclear sets and effects were designed collaboratively by the production designer Philip Rosenberg, and Bran Ferren who is credited with the special effects. Ferren used literally tons of technical gear purchased surplus from Los Alamos National Laboratory, and performed most of the visual effects work, including robotics, live on set.

"As I start to develop as a director, I wanted to do projects that were inherently more cinematic," said Brickman. "Where the freight was not so much in the dialogue, where it would be carried more by the camera. I have long sequences in this film that are nearly dialogue-less, and it's a subject I wanted to do. It's different than anything else I've done, and I like that. A lot more moving camera, a lot more attention to a certain type of style, more active and less parochial, in a way, than films I've done in the past."

== Release and reception ==
=== Box Office ===
The film earned $2 million in film rentals to theaters in the United States during its first year of release.

Some attributed this poor performance to the Chernobyl nuclear disaster around the same time. However Brickman downplayed this. "When Chernobyl happened, other people said to me, 'God, what great timing,' as if I had some kind of foresight to do the film. But when you think about it, something's always popping up about nuclear weapons or reactors every couple of months. I don't think it matters. If the film works, it works."

=== Critical response ===
On the review aggregator website Rotten Tomatoes, 50% of 18 critics' reviews are positive, with an average rating of 5.5/10. Metacritic, which uses a weighted average, assigned the film a score of 61 out of 100, based on 11 critics, indicating "generally favorable" reviews. Audiences polled by CinemaScore gave the film an average grade of "B−" on an A+ to F scale.

Chicago Sun-Times critic Roger Ebert gave the film four out of four stars and called it "a clever, funny and very skillful thriller ... that stays as close as possible to the everyday lives of convincing people, so that the movie's frightening aspects are convincing". He particularly took note of how "sophisticated" the film was about the relationship between Paul Stephens and John Matthewson, while praising Brickman's ability to "combines everyday personality conflicts with a funny, oddball style of seeing things, and wrap up the whole package into a tense and effective thriller. It's not often that one movie contains so many different kinds of pleasures."

Brickman received the President's Award from the Academy of Science Fiction, Fantasy & Horror Films for The Manhattan Project. Brickman would not direct again until the 2001 Showtime television movie Sister Mary Explains It All. In the role of Jenny, Cynthia Nixon was nominated for the Young Artist Award in the category of Exceptional Performance by a Young Actress, Supporting Role.
