= Right to Kill? =

1985 American made-for-television film

- Genre: Crime; Drama
- Screenplay by: Joyce Eliason
- Directed by: John Erman
- Starring: Frederic Forrest; Christopher Collet; Karmin Murcelo; Justine Bateman; Ann Wedgeworth; Alison Bartlett
- Music by: Paul Chihara
- Country of origin: United States
- Original language: English

Production
- Executive producers: Frank Konigsberg; Donald Wrye
- Producers: Jack Clements; Elizabeth Monk Daley
- Production location: Dallas
- Cinematography: Gayne Rescher
- Editor: Scott Conrad
- Running time: 100 min.
- Production companies: Wyre/Konigsberg Productions; Taper Media Enterprises; Telepictures

Original release
- Network: ABC
- Release: May 22, 1985

Right to Kill? is a 1985 American made-for-television drama film directed by John Erman and written by Joyce Eliason. It is based on a true story of two teens living in Wyoming, Richard Jahnke and Deborah Jahnke, who were charged for the killing of their psychotically abusive father, Richard Jahnke, Sr.

The made-for-TV movie was filmed at W.W. Samuell High School in Dallas, Texas in 1985 and aired nationally on May 22, 1985, on ABC. The film's leading actors were Frederic Forrest (Oscar-nominated for The Rose in 1979) and Justine Bateman, who was nominated for an Emmy for playing the role of an emotionally and physically abused daughter in this movie.

The cast included Frederic Forrest, Christopher Collet, Karmin Murcelo, Justine Bateman, Ann Wedgeworth and J. T. Walsh.

== Cast ==
- Frederic Forrest as Richard Jahnke Sr.
- Christopher Collet as Richard Jahnke Jr.
- Karmin Murcelo as Maria Jahnke
- Justine Bateman as Deborah Jahnke
- Ann Wedgeworth as Eva Whitcomb
- Terry O'Quinn as Jim Barrett
- Lisa Blake Richards as Vera Scofield
- J. T. Walsh as Major Eckworth
- Alison Bartlett as Candy
- John M. Jackson as Social Worker
- Jerry Haynes as Mr. Harris
- Daniel von Bargen as Detective Roberts
- Robert Ginnaven as Detective Marquez
- Marc Gilpin as Billy
