= The Perfect House (2011 American film) =

2013 film

- Film poster
- Directed by: Kris Hulbert; Randy Kent
- Written by: Kris Hulbert
- Produced by: Hans Hernke
- Starring: Felissa Rose; Jonathan Tiersten; John Philbin; Dustin Stevens; Monique Parent; Andrea Vahl; William A. Robertson; Kris Smith
- Cinematography: Tal Lazar
- Edited by: Sean Cain
- Release date: 1 October 2011
- Running time: 84 minutes
- Country: United States
- Language: English

The Perfect House is a 2011 American horror film directed by Kris Hulbert and Randy Kent. The film starring Felissa Rose, Jonathan Tiersten, John Philbin, Dustin Stevens, Monique Parent and Andrea Vahl in the lead roles.

== Premise ==
A young couple's dream home turns into a house of horrors when the disturbing, violent acts of three generations of doomed families is reawakened for them to witness.

== Cast ==
- Felissa Rose as Mother
- Jonathan Tiersten as John Doesy
- John Philbin as Jeff
- Dustin Stevens as The Stranger
- Monique Parent as Real Estate Agent
- Andrea Vahl as Marisol
- William A. Robertson as Mike
- Alan Kroll as Gus
- Chris Raab as Steve
- Kris Smith as Storm Mother
- Timothy Dugan as Storm Father
- Alex Victoria as Storm Daughter
- Michael Wagner as Storm Son
- Holly Greene as Female Cage Victim
- Hans Hernke as Male Cage Victim
- Angelina Leigh as Female Victim
- Becky Friedman as Distraught Mother
