= Sandra Dorsey =

American actress (1939–2023)

- Born: September 28, 1939; Atlanta, Georgia, U.S.
- Died: September 26, 2023 (aged 83)
- Occupations: Actress, director, writer, choreographer
- Years active: 1976–2014
- Spouse: Joe Dorsey
- Website: http://dorseystudios.com

Sandra Dorsey (September 28, 1939 – September 26, 2023) was an American actress, director, writer, and choreographer. She is best known for her role in the 1989 horror sequel Sleepaway Camp III: Teenage Wasteland.

== Life and career ==
Dorsey was born in Atlanta, Georgia, and founded Dorsey Studios there in 1977. Before her acting career, Dorsey was a teacher of acting and singing exclusively in New York City. She had also taught at the Alliance Theatre in Atlanta and at Emory University. She was a member of the Screen Actors Guild, Actors' Equity Association, The American Federation of Television and Radio Arts, The Dekalb Council for the Arts, The College Music Society, The Episcopal Drama Foundation, and The National Academy of Television Arts and Sciences. She had also served as SAG president for the state of Georgia. In addition to her work at Dorsey Studios, Dorsey had worked at the Bachelor of Arts, Oglethorpe University, Master of Fine Arts in Vocal Performance and the University of Georgia. She had also attended the Academy of Vocal Arts in Philadelphia, and had studied extensively with the David LeGrant Actors Studio in New York. She had performed in five plays on Broadway in NYC, Illya Darling with Melina Mercouri, Gantry with Robert Shaw and Rita Moreno, Drat! The Cat! with Elliott Gould, On the Town with Bernadette Peters and Phyllis Newman, and Mata Hari with Pernell Roberts and directed by Vincente Minnelli. She played Fraulein Kost in the National Tour of Cabaret directed by Harold Prince. Dorsey wrote and directed Biba Revue at Maxim's in Chicago. She directed and choreographed Amahl and the Night Visitors in Atlanta, and was musical director for An Evening with Rodgers and Hammerstein at Emory University. She also directed the critically acclaimed Jacques Brel Is Alive and Well and Living in Paris.

Dorsey began her acting career in 1976 when she appeared in the horror film Grizzly. She then appeared in her second film They Went That-A-Way & That-A-Way in 1978 and the following year she starred alongside Sally Field and Beau Bridges in the classic film Norma Rae. Dorsey's husband Joe Dorsey also made appearances in each of these films. Dorsey is best known for her role in the horror movie Sleepaway Camp III: Teenage Wasteland, alongside Pamela Springsteen and Michael J. Pollard. In the film, she played the role of camp owner Lily Miranda. She and her on-screen husband (Pollard) Herman's character names were after The Munsters characters Herman and Lily Munster, and the other characters in the film were named after The Brady Bunch. Her death scene, where she was decapitated by a lawnmower, is perhaps the best death scene in the film. This was Dorsey's second time working with director Michael A. Simpson, as the first was in 1986 with Impure Thoughts. In 1995, Dorsey played the role of Maxine in the Disney movie Gordy, which was her final feature film.

Her television credits include The Dukes of Hazzard. She had also appeared in several television films including Passing Glory, with Rip Torn, Frankenstein, with Parker Posey, and Angel City, which again featured her husband, Joe, working alongside her.

Sandra Dorsey died of pancreatic cancer on September 26, 2023, two days before her 84th birthday.

== Filmography ==
Film
Year	Title	Role	Notes
1976	Grizzly	Sally Walker	
1978	They Went That-A-Way & That-A-Way	Lady with Kids	
1979	Norma Rae	Jail Matron	
1986	Impure Thoughts	Sister Othilda	
1989	Sleepaway Camp III: Teenage Wasteland	Lily Miranda	
1994	Gordy	Maxine	
2007	Tonky	Aunt Dotty	Short film
2014	Dumb and Dumber To	Stuffy Woman	
Television
Year	Title	Role	Notes
1979	The Dukes of Hazzard	Deputy Hazel	Episode: "One Armed Bandits"
1980	The Georgia Peaches		Television film
1980	Angel City	1st Woman	Television film
1982	Maid in America	Construction Worker #3	Television film
1999	Passing Glory	Sister Gonzaga	Television film
2004	Frankenstein	Nancy Whistler	Television film
