= Daryl Wilcher =

American actor (born 1969)

- Born: June 19, 1969 (age 56); Atlanta, Georgia, United States
- Occupation: Actor
- Years active: 1988–2010
- Website: http://www.daryl-wilcher.tk

Daryl Wilcher (born June 19, 1969) is an American actor.

== Early life and career ==
Wilcher was born in Atlanta, Georgia. He began appearing in commercials for KFC, Coca-Cola and Combos Pretzels at a young age. He is an SAG actor who trained in several theater groups in Atlanta, he spent three years training at the Academy theater in Atlanta, Georgia and a further two years with the Robert Sawyer theater group in Atlanta, Georgia and Los Angeles . He began acting in film and television 1988 when he appeared in the long-running television series America's Most Wanted. The following year, he starred alongside Pamela Springsteen in cult horror sequel Sleepaway Camp III: Teenage Wasteland, in which he played the role of "Riff", perhaps a character he is best known for. His other movie appearances include Freejack, with Emilio Estevez and Mick Jagger, and the direct-to-video films Zombeak, Grandma's Sloopy Seconds and Clown Versus Monkey His television appearances include a guest roles in crime series In the Heat of the Night, and the 1990 television film Murder in Mississippi, with Jennifer Grey.

Wilcher has also worked as a video technician, having worked with music video and comedy concert tour producers Davenstar Media Group, in productions such as The Kings of Comedy and Tyler Perry's Madea's Class Reunion, and a screenwriter, two if his screenplays include The Wish Box and All We've Got.

== Personal life ==
Wilcher loves to work with animals, he has worked as a technician at an animal centre. He draws cartoons and works as a freelance cartoonist and storyboardist. He also works part-time as a massage therapist.

== Filmography ==
=== Film ===
- 1989: Sleepaway Camp III: Teenage Wasteland ... Riff
- 1992: Freejack ... Youth Gang member
- 2006: Zombeak ... Leviathan (video)
- 2006: Grandma's Sloppy Seconds ... Riffley Rogers (unknown year)
- 2009: The Sadie Special ... David (short)
- 2010: Clown Versus Monkey ... Performer (unknown year)

=== Television ===
- 1988: America's Most Wanted ... James King (episode: "Donald Parsons/Gregory McQueen"
- 1990: Murder in Mississippi ... Reggie (uncredited) (television film)
- 1988–1991: In the Heat of the Night ... Eric Gray, Bob Fannoy (episodes: "Prisoners", "Just a Country Boy", "Unfinished Business")
- Unsolved Mysteries ... Trustee Darrell (unknown episodes; unknown year)
- News for Kids ... Anchor (unknown episodes; unknown year)
- Innervisions ... Doug (unknown episodes; unknown year)

== Theatre ==
- What's Good for the Goose ... Harold
- Confessions of a Female Disorder ... Letterman
- Running Sweat ... The Runner
- The Bread-Winner ... Buster
- Poetry Play ... Poet #4
