= The Perfect House (2011 Indonesian film) =

2011 film

- Film poster
- Directed by: Affandi Abdul Rachman
- Written by: Affandi Abdul Rachman; Alim Sudio
- Produced by: Vera Lasut
- Starring: Endy Arfian; Bella Esperance; Mike Lucock; Wanda Nizar; Cathy Sharon
- Cinematography: Faozan Rizal
- Edited by: Yoga Krispratama
- Music by: Bembi Gusti; Aghi Narottama
- Release date: 27 October 2011
- Running time: 96 minutes
- Country: Indonesia
- Language: Indonesian

The Perfect House is a 2011 Indonesian thriller film directed by Affandi Abdul Rachman and produced by Vera Lasut.The film starring Endy Arfian, Bella Esperance, Mike Lucock and Wanda Nizar in the lead roles.

== Cast ==
- Endy Arfian
- Bella Esperance
- Mike Lucock
- Wanda Nizar
- Cathy Sharon
