= Katherine Kamhi =

American actress (born 1964)

- Born: February 15, 1964 (age 62); New York City, U.S.
- Occupation: Actress
- Years active: 1980–present
- Spouse: Tony Coghlan (m. 1995)
- Children: 2

Katherine Kamhi (born February 15, 1964) is an American actress. She made her on-screen debut with a recurring role as Pamela Kingsley on the ABC soap opera All My Children (1980–1982).

Following All My Children, Kamhi had her breakout with her starring role as Meg in the slasher film Sleepaway Camp (1983), which went on to develop a cult following. She then had a supporting role in the slasher film Silent Madness (1984).

Throughout her career, Kamhi has mostly had guest roles in television shows. She had a recurring role as Detective Hubbel on the ABC crime drama series L.A. Dragnet (2003).

== Early life ==
When she was 11 years old, she performed as a ballet dancer at Metropolitan Opera House. She later did stage acting while at New York's Performing Arts High School, and graduated from Professional Children's School.

== Film and television career ==
Kamhi landed her first screen role as Pamela Kingsley on the popular daytime soap opera All My Children in 1980. She continued to appear on the series until 1982. In 1983, Kamhi made her film debut in the horror film Sleepaway Camp, playing the role of mean-spirited camp counselor Meg. Since its release, the film has achieved status as a cult classic from what is often considered the golden age of slasher cinema. Following Sleepaway Camp, Kamhi went on to appear as Marcy Campbell on Guiding Light for four years.

Since the 2000s, Kamhi has consistently landed guest starring roles in many other popular TV shows. Some of her most notable appearances have been in series like Judging Amy, Ghost Whisperer, Bones, Castle, Scorpion, and NCIS: Los Angeles, as well as on soap operas such as General Hospital and The Young and the Restless.

She is currently filming for a documentary on Sleepaway Camp called Angela: The Official Sleepaway Camp Documentary, directed by Michael Perez.

== Personal life ==
She currently lives in Los Angeles with her husband Tony Coghlan; they have one daughter, Madeleine, and one son, Jack.

== Filmography ==
=== Film ===
| Year | Title | Role | Notes |
|---|---|---|---|
| 1980 | Ramona and Her Father | Beezus (voice) | Credited as Kathy Gene |
| 1983 | Sleepaway Camp | Meg | |
| 1984 | Silent Madness | Jane | |
| 2014 | The Occupants | Mother | |
| 2017 | Girl Followed | Nice Woman in Park | |
| 2024 | Unspoken | Michelle Stein | |

=== Television ===
| Year | Title | Role | Notes |
|---|---|---|---|
| 1980–1982 | All My Children | Pamela Kingsley | 6 episodes |
| 1981 | CBS Afternoon Playhouse | Becky | Episode: "Portrait of a Teenage Shoplifter" |
| 1982 | The Edge of Night | Girl in restaurant | Uncredited |
| 1984 | Kate & Allie | Suzie | Episode: "Diner" |
| 1985 | American Playhouse | Josephine Cosnowski | Episode: "The Star-Crossed Romance of Josephine Cosnowski" |
| 1986; 1988; 1990 | Guiding Light | Marcy | 3 episodes |
| 1988 | ABC Afterschool Specials | Julia Flemming | Episode: "Terrible Things My Mother Told Me" |
| 1990 | The Marshall Chronicles | Brenda | Episode: "Night of the Chopped Liver" |
| 1990 | Get a Life | Stacy | Episode: "The Sitting" |
| 1995 | NYPD Blue | Connie Williams | Episode: "One Big Happy Family" |
| 2003 | L.A. Dragnet | Detective Hubbel | 7 episodes |
| 2003 | The Practice | Atty. Marsha Singleton | Episode: "The Chosen" |
| 2003 | Judging Amy | Mrs. Nichols / Ella Croft | Episode: "Into the Fire" |
| 2003 | Without a Trace | Paula | Episode: "Moving On" |
| 2008 | Ghost Whisperer | Deb Yates | Episode: "The Gravesitter" |
| 2008–2009 | The Young and the Restless | Gretchen Mills / Dr. Alicia Jamison | 2 episodes |
| 2009 | Mental | Elodie Martin | Episode: "Pilot" |
| 2009 | Bones | Officer Lisa Kopek | 2 episodes |
| 2010 | Medium | Whitten Mom | Episode: "There Will Be Blood... Type B" |
| 2011 | Law & Order: LA | Det. Anna Lundgrad | Episode: "Silver Lake" |
| 2012 | Touch | Sharon Deluca | Episode: "Tessellations" |
| 2013 | Castle | Lina El-Masri | 2 episodes |
| 2014 | Parenthood | Dr. Meadow | Episode: "Vegas" |
| 2015 | Scorpion | Dr. Hill | Episode: "Postcards from the Edge" |
| 2016 | NCIS: Los Angeles | Samantha Rogers | Episode: "The Queen's Gambit" |
| 2016 | Code Black | Denise | Episode: "1.0 Bodies" |
| 2017 | Speechless | Administrator #1 | Episode: "F-i-First S-e-Second F-First Day" |
| 2018 | The Fosters | Judge Engleman | Episode: "Meet the Fosters" |
| 2018 | Get Shorty | Cath Nardini | 2 episodes |
| 2019 | Truth Be Told | Darla | Episode: "Not Buried, Planted" |
| 2025 | 9-1-1 | Dr. Barnes | Episode: "Voices" |
| 2025 | The Rookie | Dash's Mother | Episode: "The Good, The Bad, and The Oscar" |
