= Victor Campos =

American film and television actor

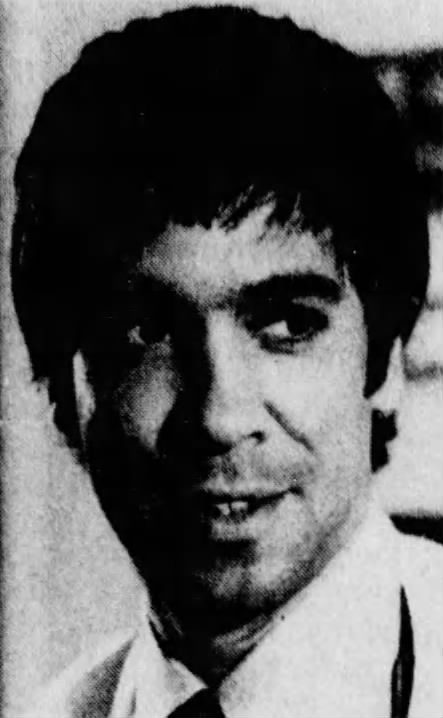
- Campos in 1975
- Born: January 15, 1935; New York City, New York, U.S.
- Died: December 4, 2018 (aged 83); Sherman Oaks, California, U.S.
- Occupations: Film and television actor

Victor Campos (January 15, 1935 – December 4, 2018) was an American film and television actor. He was known for playing Deputy Rudy Davillo in the American police drama television series Cade's County.

== Life and career ==
Campos was born in New York City. He was a professional lightweight boxer. He began his acting career at the Puerto Rican Mobile Theater.

In 1971, Campos starred in the CBS police drama television series Cade's County, playing Deputy Rudy Davillo. After the series ended in 1972, he starred as Dr. Felipe Ortega in NBC's medical drama series Doctors' Hospital. He played the role until 1976. in 1975. He guest-starred in television programs including The Streets of San Francisco, Cannon, Kojak, T.J. Hooker, The New Perry Mason, The A-Team, Mission: Impossible, McCloud, This Is the Life and Kolchak: The Night Stalker. He also appeared in films such as Five Days from Home, Scarface, The Master Gunfighter, Sleepaway Camp IV: The Survivor, Split Decisions, Moving Violations, Murder on the Yellow Brick Road and Black Sunday.

== Death ==
Campos died on December 4, 2018, in Sherman Oaks, California, at the age of 83.
