= Susan Marie Snyder =

American actress

- Occupation: Actress
- Years active: 1986–2002
- Notable work: Sleepaway Camp II: Unhappy Campers (1988)
- Television: Santa Barbara (1988); As the World Turns (1989–2002)
- Spouses: Peter G. Boynton (m. 1989; div. 1995) Daniel Sonis (m. 1999)
- Children: 1

Susan Marie Snyder is an American actress.

== Career ==
Snyder had her first acting job on Late Night with David Letterman where she appeared in a series of recurring skits.

She played Julie Snyder on CBS' soap As the World Turns. She portrayed the role from 1989 to 1995 and returned shortly twice in 1998 and 2002. Prior to joining the show, Susan had a starring role on another soap, NBC's Santa Barbara. She was the second actress to portray Laken Lockridge, from 1987 to 1988.

Snyder has starred in two feature films, in 1986 she had a brief appearance in Ruthless People, which starred Danny DeVito and Bette Midler and she played the role of Mare in 1988 sequel Sleepaway Camp II: Unhappy Campers alongside Pamela Springsteen.

== Personal life ==
She was married to ATWT co-star Peter G. Boynton from 1989 to 1995. They have one daughter together. She has been married to Daniel Sonis since 1999. After leaving ATWT, she retired from acting and moved to Vermont. She legally changed her name to Suzenne Marie Seradwyn. She currently lives in Albuquerque, New Mexico.

== Filmography ==
Year	Title	Role	Notes
Film
1986	Ruthless People	Katie, Stereo Store Customer	
1988	Sleepaway Camp II: Unhappy Campers	Mare	
Television
1986	Betrayed by Innocence	Andrea DeLeon	Television film
1987	Gimme a Break!	Linda	2 episodes - Parent's Week: Part 1 Parent's Week: Part 2
1988	Santa Barbara	Laken Lockridge	56 episodes (1987–1988)
1989–2002	As the World Turns	Julie Snyder	(1989–1995, 1998, 2002)
