= James Oliverio =

American composer

James Oliverio is an American composer of film scores and contemporary classical music.

== Biography ==
Oliverio was born in Cleveland, Ohio. He studied composition at the Cleveland Institute of Music. Oliverio later moved to Atlanta, Georgia, where he was the composer-in-residence at the Georgia Institute of Technology. His music for the film Time and Dreams was included in Atlanta's successful bid to host the 1996 Summer Olympics. His piece The Explorer (later retitled To Boldly Go...) was commissioned and premiered as the opening for that summer's four-year Cultural Olympiad. During the 1990s, Oliverio was described as "Atlanta's hottest composer".

Since January 2001, Oliverio has served as Executive Director of the Digital Worlds Institute at the University of Florida.

A lifelong friend of the timpanist brothers Paul and Mark Yancich, Oliverio has composed a number of works for the performers, including his first and second timpani concertos and the 2011 double timpani concerto Dynasty.

== List of compositions ==
- The Fall of Babylon (1974) for mezzo-soprano and wind quintet
- Dantreume Leu Pliska (1975) for timpani and amplified double bass
- Etude for Four Harps (1975)
- Piano Sonata No. 1 (1976) for two pianos
- Aradia (1978) for acoustic and electronic chamber ensemble
- J'ai Plus de Souvenirs (1978) for soprano and amplified double bass quintet
- Go Gently, My Friend (1986) for symphony orchestra
- American Suite (1988) for symphony orchestra
- Anniversary Overture (1988) for symphony orchestra
- Drawn to the Light (1989) for chorus and orchestra
- Timpani Concerto No. 1: The Olympian (1990) for timpani and orchestra
- Winds of the Magic Wood (1990) for woodwind quintet and narrator
- Concerto for Orchestra (1990)
- The Story of Snow White: A Child's Introduction to the Symphony Orchestra, Second Edition (1991)
- Voyage Through the Musical Universe (1991) for orchestra and narrator
- Songs Without Words (1992) for chamber ensemble
- The Lessons of Time (1992) for chorus and orchestra
- Imaginary Worlds (1992) chamber ensemble with electronics
- Common Ground (1992) ballet for orchestra
- Pilgrimage: Concerto for Brass (1992) for orchestra and brass soloists
- Children of a Common Mother (1992) for four ethnic storytellers and multicultural percussion orchestra
- To Boldly Go... (The Explorer) (1992) for orchestra
- Dark Serenade (1994) for piano, cello, and orchestra
- The Science of Imagination (1995) for orchestra and large-scale digital media
- Three Scenes for Flute and Orchestra (1995)
- StarChild: the Opera (1996) opera for live performers and large-scale digital media
- Timpani Concerto No. 1 (1996) for timpani and symphonic winds
- A Thousand Lifetimes (1997) for five singers and orchestra
- DRUMMA (1998) for large percussion ensemble and timpani soloist
- Dreamers, Then Remembering, Open the Sky (1998) for MIDI percussion soloists and symphonic band
- Generations (2000) for chorus and orchestra
- The Messenger (2001) for percussion, orchestra, and digital media
- Hands Across the Ocean (2004) for distributed performance ensemble and online interactive virtual environment
- In Common: Time (2005) for distributed performance ensemble and online interactive virtual environment
- DRUMMA v2.0 (2006) for distributed percussion ensemble and interactive virtual environment
- Timpani Concerto No. 2 (2007) for timpani and orchestra
- SMOKE|WIRE|ROCK (2007)
- Voyage to Tomorrow (2008) for chorus, orchestra, and digital media
- Little Tricker the Squirrel Meets Big Double the Bear (2008) ballet
- Dynasty (2011) Concerto for two timpanists and orchestra
