= Jonathan Tiersten =

American actor (1965–2026)

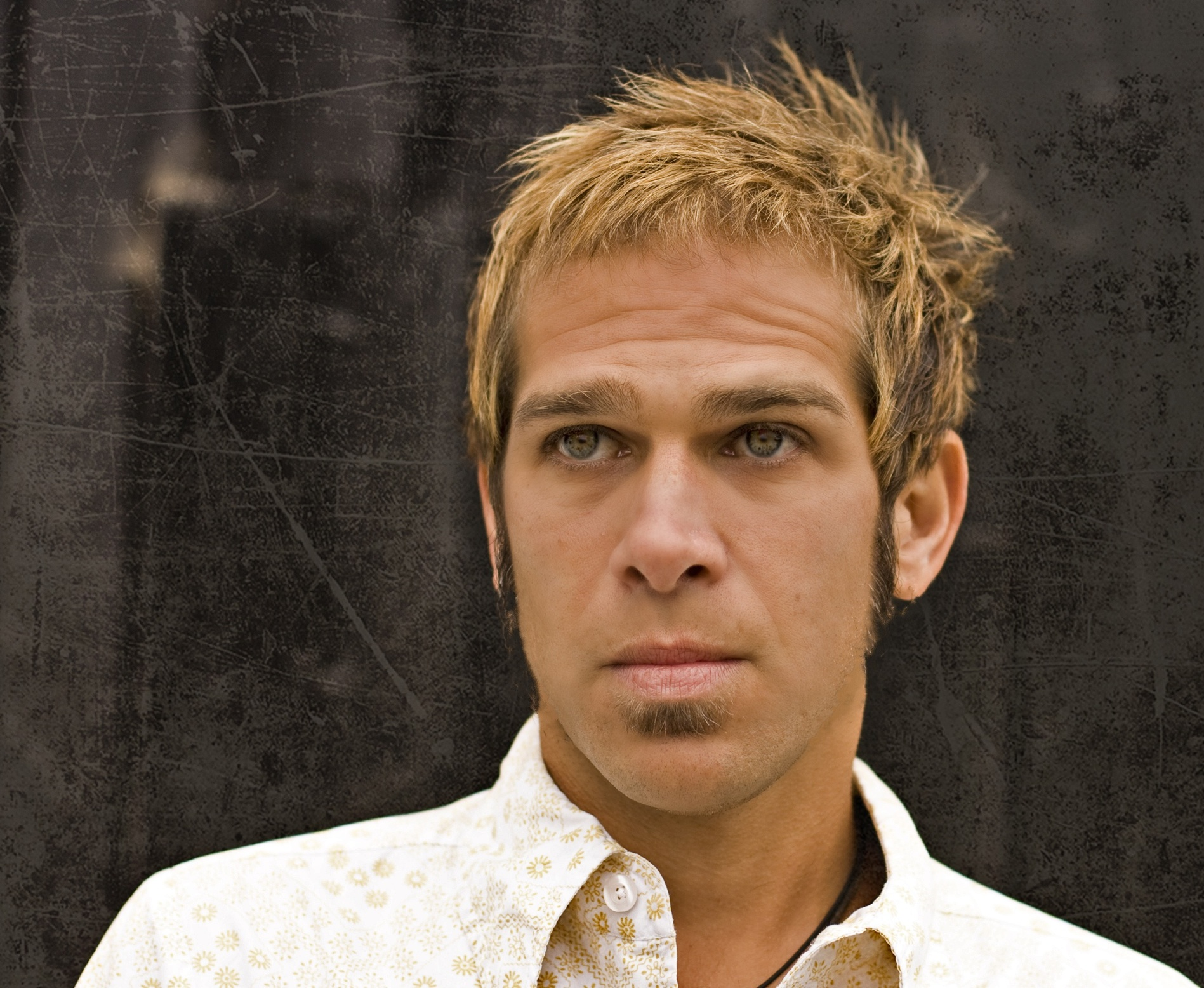
- Tiersten in 2009
- Born: August 11, 1965; New York City, New York, U.S.
- Died: April or May 2026 (aged 60); Newark, New Jersey, U.S.
- Occupations: Actor; musician
- Years active: 1981–2026

Jonathan Tiersten (August 11, 1965 – April or May 2026) was an American actor and musician. He was primarily known for his role as Ricky Thomas in the 1983 cult slasher film Sleepaway Camp. He reprised the role in the 2008 sequel Return to Sleepaway Camp.

== Early life ==
Tiersten was born in Queens, New York City, and raised in Maplewood, New Jersey. Tiersten studied acting at New York University.

== Career ==
=== Acting ===
He made his screen debut with an uncredited role in a 1981 episode of Another World before being cast as Ricky Thomas in the 1983 slasher film Sleepaway Camp. Tiersten reprised his role in the 2008 sequel Return to Sleepaway Camp.

In 2012 and 2013 Tiersten garnered three best actor awards and was nominated for a fourth for his portrayal of John Doesy in the horror film The Perfect House.

=== Music ===
In between acting Jonathan took to music, fronting a number of bands, mostly based out of the Fort Collins, Colorado area. Tiersten was the lead singer of the band Ten Tiers and composed the score to a short starring David Krumholtz. Tiersten also starred in the 2012 film The Perfect House in which he played a serial killer named John Doesy and the thriller film Redemption which co-stars George Loros and Meredith Ostrom. Tiersten also composed the theme song for The Perfect House and contributed to the soundtrack of Redemption. Tiersten's 2011 EP We'll See, released by Edward Records, ranked third in Magnet magazine's most anticipated albums list. Shakefire.com called the album "surprising" and "simply amazing", rating it 4 out of 4 stars.

Tiersten also recorded a version of the Mickey & Sylvia song "Love Is Strange" for the remake of Ed Wood's Plan 9 from Outer Space called Plan 9, starring Brian Krause.

== Death ==
On May 5, 2026, it was announced that Tiersten had died at the age of 60 at his New Jersey home the prior week. His death was confirmed by his brother, William.

== Filmography ==
=== Film ===
Year	Title	Role	Notes	Ref.
1983	Sleepaway Camp	Ricky Thomas	Credited as Jonathan Tierston	
2008	Return to Sleepaway Camp	Ricky Thomas		
2012	Sleepaway Camp IV: The Survivor	Ricky Thomas		
2013	The Perfect House	John Doesy		
2016	Sugar!	Joe		
2019	Terror Tales	Segment: "The Sledgehammer"		
2019	Lake of Shadows	Alex Kintner		
2021	Toilet Zombie Baby Strikes Back	Eric Sommers		
2022	Last American Horror Show: Volume II	Captain Strike		
2022	Time's Up	Gene		

=== Television ===
Year	Title	Role	Notes	Ref.
1981	Another World	Kid With Basketball	1 episode	
1984	CBS Schoolbreak Special	Chip Beddington	Episode: "The Alfred G. Graebner Memorial High School Handbook of Rules and Regulations"	
1987	ABC Afterschool Special	Jason	Episode: "Seasonal Differences"	
