= Robert Hiltzik =

American writer and director

- Born: February 21, 1957 (age 69)
- Occupations: Film director; screenwriter; lawyer
- Years active: 1983–2008
- Works: Sleepaway Camp; Return to Sleepaway Camp
- Spouses: Michele Tatosian (m. 1982)
- Children: 3

Robert Hiltzik (born February 21, 1957) is an American director and writer. He is best known as the writer and director of the 1983 summer camp slasher film Sleepaway Camp, which attracted a cult following.

== Personal life ==
Hiltzik graduated from Williams College and continued to NYU's Tisch School of the Arts for film and then attended Hofstra University Law School. He now works as a partner in a New York City law firm.

== Career ==
Hiltzik was unaware that his film had gained such a devoted following over the years, until he was contacted in March 2000 by Sleepawaycampmovies.com's Jeff Hayes, who arranged for him to record a commentary for the film's Anchor Bay Entertainment DVD. After a number of sequels directed and written by others, Hiltzik returned to write and direct a 2003 sequel, Return to Sleepaway Camp. He decided that this newest chapter would ignore the storylines of the other sequels, saying that he wanted to pick up where the original film had ended. The production was stopped for some time (according to Fangoria.com, the digital effects were being redone) before being released in 2008 as a direct-to-video sequel. Hiltzik has not directed any other films.
