= Sleepaway Camp IV: The Survivor =

1992 American film

- Theatrical release poster
- Directed by: Jim Markovic
- Written by: Tom Clohessy
- Produced by: Krishna Shah
- Starring: Carrie Chambers; Victor Campos; John Lodico
- Production companies: Double Helix Films; Rainbow Productions
- Release dates: 2002 (special feature); March 23, 2012 (standalone DVD release)
- Country: United States
- Language: English

Sleepaway Camp IV: The Survivor is a 1992 American slasher film and the fourth installment in the Sleepaway Camp film series. The film stars Carrie Chambers, John Lodico, and Victor Campos.

The film was initially abandoned during production in 1992. Twenty years later, it was completed using archive footage from the first three films, and was given its own on-demand DVD release.

== Plot ==
In 1993, four years following the events of Sleepaway Camp III: Teenage Wasteland, Allison Kramer is plagued by gruesome nightmares that revisit a campsite. Unable to recall the actual events due to a forced mental block, she seeks the help of a psychiatrist in overcoming her insomnia.

After numerous visits and hypnosis, Allison's psychiatrist tells her that she is seemingly a survivor of a camp massacre which occurred over a decade ago. Her disbelief of the whole situation inclines the psychiatrist to advise her to return to the site for an afternoon, in hopes that if she were to see the scene of the crime, she would remember and overcome them.

Doubtful, Allison sets out for the camp she attended but never remembered. When she reaches her destination she finds the camp closed and abandoned, the land now Federal Property. She reminisces about the events that occurred in the original trilogy; Allison narrating over many of these scenes. Archive footage from the first three films are organized into themes, such as Angela being afraid of water. Allison looks for a ranger, Jack, that her psychologist, Dr. Lewis, told her to meet up with. The ranger tries to have sex with her, but Allison decides things are going too far and runs away. The ranger chases her through the woods. Allison stops as she can run no longer. She is found by a hunter, Eugene, who almost shoots her out of fear.

Later on, she approaches the ranger with the hunter's gun and threatens to kill him if he doesn't stay away from her. She then returns to the hunter and shoots him. In the next scene, Allison is standing in the sun with a knife, which the sun is reflecting off of. The ranger approaches her, but she whirls around and the film freezes as she holds the knife near him. It then cuts to a cabin, where the hunter's and the ranger's decaying bodies can be seen. The credits then roll over the image.

It is then revealed (as implied in the opening crawl) that "Allison" is actually an amnesiac Angela Baker, the killer from the three previous films, being "a woman without identity," due to having been knocked out by an ambulance driver after the events of the third film, and asking "But who is Allison, really?", in addition to her having had flashbacks of certain scenes throughout the original trilogy that only Angela was present for or survived through, realizing her identity upon rediscovering all of her memories at the film's climax, before returning to the psychiatric clinic.

== Cast ==
- Carrie Chambers as Allison Kramer / Angela Baker
- Victor Campos as Eugene The Hunter
- John Lodico as Jack The Ranger

An uncredited actor portrays Dr. Lewis, Allison's psychiatrist.

Many actors from previous films in the series appear via archival footage.

== Production ==
Filming began in October 1992 at Camp Tamarack in Oakland, New Jersey. While initial filming was underway the movie's production company, Double Helix Films, went bankrupt. Production on the film ceased with the intent to continue the following year with additional money, but this did not come to fruition. Approximately 34 minutes of footage was shot and a film trailer was made.

In 2008 John Klyza approached director Jim Markovic about completing the film. The two utilized several techniques to complete the movie. New scenes were written around the existing footage, the character of Allison was given an expository narrative, and low-level CGI was utilized to assist in the creation of The Survivor's death scenes, which were not among the scenes shot in 1992. Klyza described the process as "a case of bleeding the dailies for every last drop of material". New footage was shot; only Carrie Chambers, Victor Campos, and John Lodico were brought in for these scenes. Existing footage from the prior films was also used.

== Release ==
The original 34 minutes of footage were initially released as a Best Buy exclusive for the 2002 region 1 release of the Sleepaway Camp Survival Kit DVD box set. In November 2010 Klyza announced that the film was completed and would be released. A completed version of the film was released to DVD in March 2012.

In 2018 Klyza announced his intent to release the movie on Blu-ray and that the release would feature a new, hi-definition remastered "final cut" that would include new extras.

== Reception ==
Horror Society reviewed the film in 2015, noting that they thought that "the biggest flaw of Sleepaway Camp IV: The Survivor is the idea to still put it forth into the world as the long forgotten fourth entry in the franchise instead of something else. They could have salvaged a few ratings sources – Amazon has it at a 1.9 and IMDB has it at a 1.8 – and they could have earned a little more money in DVD purchases and streams by marketing it as Sleepaway Camp IV: The Documentary."
