= Tangerine Dream discography =

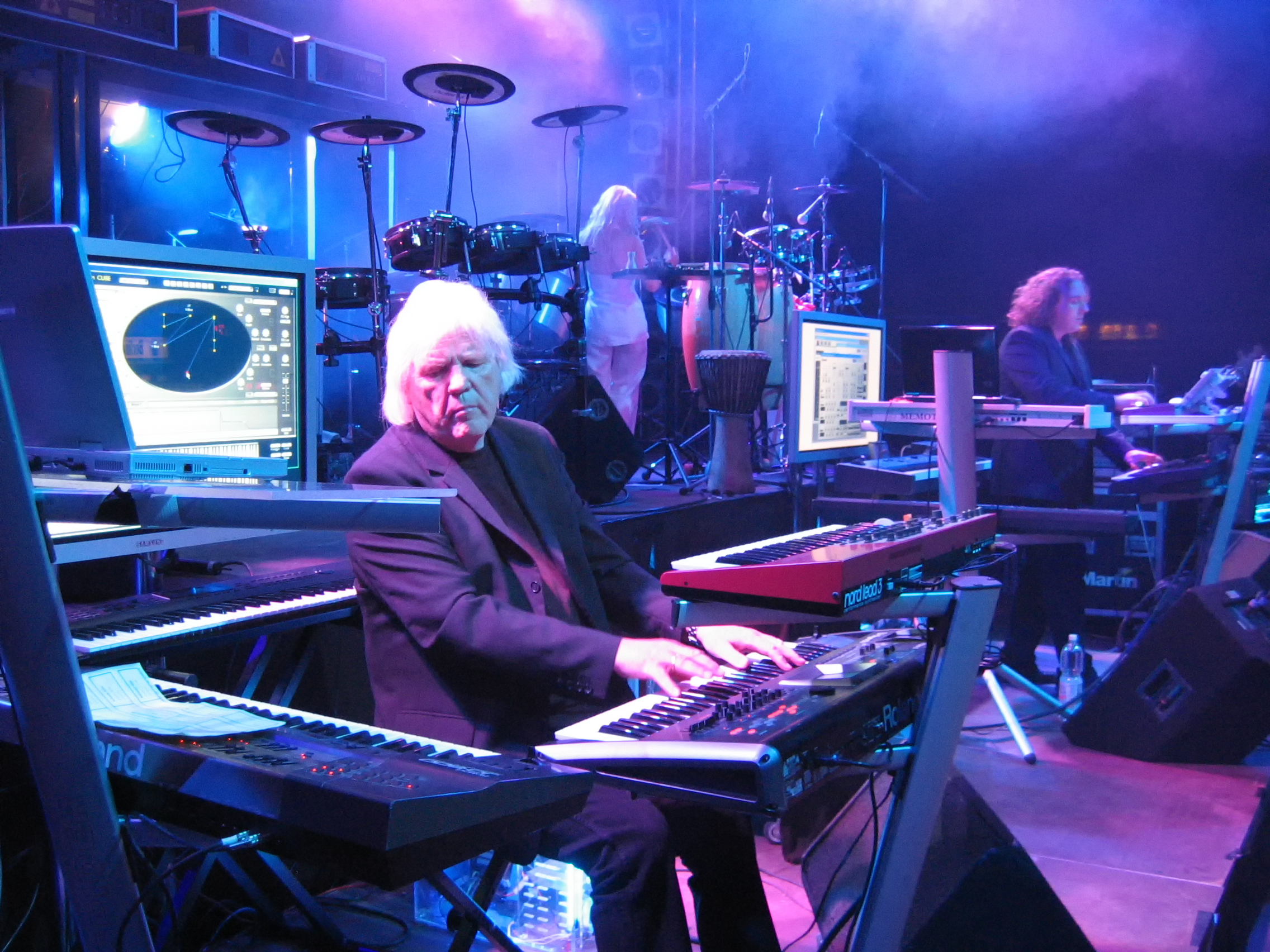
- Tangerine Dream performing in 2007
- Extended plays: 26
- Soundtrack albums: 36
- Compilation albums: 78
- Singles: 66
- Video albums: 21
- Live and studio albums: 110
- Unique sampler albums: 4

The electronic music group Tangerine Dream has released more than three hundred albums, singles, EPs and compilations since the group was formed in 1967.

== Eras ==
Tangerine Dream's releases have been divided into several eras based on the record label of the time. Tangerine Dream's first releases were on the Ohr label. The Ohr logo was a pink ear, thus fans refer to this era as the Pink Years; this covers Electronic Meditation (1970) to Atem (1973). In 1974, the band switched to Virgin Records with the release of Phaedra, thus the Virgin Years. The switch to the Jive Records label with their blue logo was the start of the Blue Years beginning with Poland in 1984.

The Melrose Years started when Tangerine Dream switched to Peter Baumann's Private Music label, located on Melrose Avenue in Los Angeles; the first release was Optical Race (1988). This was a period of rapid line-up changes, beginning with the departure of Christopher Franke, and ending with the departure of Paul Haslinger and the introduction of Jerome Froese and Linda Spa. A switch to the Miramar label in Seattle gave the name Seattle Years with the release of Rockoon (1992).

Tangerine Dream moved to the Castle label in 1996 briefly before Edgar Froese created his own TDI label, thus this era is the TDI Years or sometimes the Millennium Years. In late 2005 the label was renamed Eastgate, giving rise to the Eastgate Years. In late 2014 Edgar Froese conceived of translating the current knowledge of quantum mechanics into sound, thus the Quantum Years and the release of Mala Kunia.

== Series ==
The Dream Mixes series is a project initiated by Jerome Froese. The series has a dance music slant and primarily consists of remixes of other TD material. The Dante Trilogy is a musical interpretation of Dante's Divine Comedy. The Five Atomic Seasons series was commissioned by a Japanese businessman who survived the atomic bombings of both Nagasaki and Hiroshima. The Bootleg Box sets, the Bootmoon series and the Vault series are live concerts sourced from recordings; many were first released as part of the Tangerine Tree project.

== Live and studio albums ==
=== Charted studio albums ===
Title	Details	Peak chart positions				Certifications
Title	Details	GER	AUS	UK	US	Certifications
The Virgin Years
Phaedra	Released: 20 February 1974; Label: Virgin	96	13	15	196	BPI: Gold
Rubycon	Released: 21 March 1975; Label: Virgin	―	95	10	―	BPI: Silver
Stratosfear	Released: October 1976; Label: Virgin	―	―	39	158	BPI: Silver
Cyclone	Released: 10 March 1978; Label: Virgin	―	98	37	―	
Force Majeure	Released: 2 February 1979; Label: Virgin	―	100	26	―	
Tangram	Released: 30 May 1980; Label: Virgin	―	―	36	―	
Exit	Released: 11 September 1981; Label: Virgin	―	―	43	195	
White Eagle	Released: 2 April 1982; Label: Virgin	42	―	57	―	
Hyperborea	Released: 30 August 1983; Label: Virgin	64	―	45	―	
The Blue Years
Underwater Sunlight	Released: 30 June 1986; Label: Jive	―	―	97	―	
Tyger	Released: 15 June 1987; Label: Jive	―	―	88	―	
"―" denotes a release that did not chart.

=== Charted live albums ===
Title	Details	Peak chart positions		Certifications
Title	Details	UK	US	Certifications
The Virgin Years
Ricochet	Released: December 1975; Label: Virgin	40	―	BPI: Silver
Encore	Released: October 1977; Label: Virgin	55	178	
The Blue Years
Poland	Released: 29 October 1984; Label: Jive	90	―	
"―" denotes a release that did not chart.

=== Other albums ===
Albums billed as live commonly include overdubs and original material added in studio. The extreme case is Live Miles, of which less than a third had been performed live at the time of its release. Given the fact that the band's live albums often consist of original music not available on any studio album, the distinction between studio and live albums is less useful with Tangerine Dream than with most bands.

Recorded	Released	Type	Album	Notes
The Pink Years
1969	1970	studio	Electronic Meditation	
1971	1971	studio	Alpha Centauri	
1972	1972	studio	Zeit	
1972	1973	studio	Atem	
The Virgin Years
1980	1981	live	Quichotte	Re-released in 1986 as Pergamon
1982	1982	live	Logos Live	
The Blue Years
1985	1985	studio	Le Parc	
1973–1984	1986	studio	Green Desert	Remixed from a 1973 recording
1987; 1988	1988	live; studio	Livemiles	Re-released in 1996 as Live Miles
The Melrose Years
1988	1988	studio	Optical Race	
1989	1989	studio	Lily on the Beach	
1990	1990	studio	Melrose	
The Seattle Years
1992–1997	1998	studio	Quinoa	
1991–1992	1992	studio	Rockoon	
1992	1993	live	220 Volt Live	
1993–1994	1994	studio	Turn of the Tides	
1994	1995	studio	Tyranny of Beauty	
1995	1995	studio	The Dream Mixes	Series: Dream Mixes
The Millennium/TDI Years
1996	1996	studio	Goblins' Club	
1997	1997	live	Tournado	
1997	1997	studio	TimeSquare – Dream Mixes II	Series: Dream Mixes
1997	1997	live	Ambient Monkeys	
1997	1998	live	Valentine Wheels	
1982	1999	live	Sohoman	Series: Tangerine Dream Classics Edition
1999	1999	studio	Mars Polaris	
1976	2000	live; studio	Soundmill Navigator	Series: Tangerine Dream Classics Edition; live portion originally recorded in 1976
1971–1988	2000	compilation; live	Antique Dreams	Series: Tangerine Dream Classics Edition
1998–2000	2000	studio	The Seven Letters from Tibet	
1977–2001	2001	studio	The Past Hundred Moons	Series: Dream Mixes
2001–2002	2002	live; studio	Inferno	Series: Dante
2002	2002	rerecording; studio	The Melrose Years	Albums: Optical Race; Lily On The Beach; Melrose; Unique tracks: "Ruling the Waves"; "Pearl River"; "The Back of Beyond"
1974, 1975, 1976	2003	live	The Bootleg Box Set Vol. 1	
1972–2003	2003	studio	DM 4	Series: Dream Mixes
1988	2003	live	Rockface	Series: Vault
1976, 1977, 1978, 1981, 1983	2004	live	The Bootleg Box Set Vol. 2	
2003–2004	2004	studio	Purgatorio	Series: Dante
1981	2004	live	Aachen–January 21st 1981	Series: Bootmoon
1977	2004	live	Montreal–April 9th 1977	Series: Bootmoon
1981	2004	live	Paris–February 2nd 1981	Series: Bootmoon
1982	2004	live	Sydney–February 22nd 1982	Series: Bootmoon
1986	2004	live	Ottawa–June 20th 1986	Series: Bootmoon
1990	2004	live	East	Series: Vault
1992	2004	live	Arizona Live	Series: Vault
1986	2005	live	Cleveland–June 24th 1986	Series: Bootmoon, Vault
1986	2005	live	Brighton–March 25th 1986	Series: Bootmoon, Vault
1983–2005	2005	studio	Kyoto	
2005	2005	studio	Jeanne d'Arc	
1999	2005	live	Rocking Mars	Series: Vault
The Eastgate Years
2005	2005	studio	Phaedra 2005	
1988; 2006	2006	studio	Blue Dawn	
2005	2006	live; studio	Paradiso	Series: Dante
2007	2007	studio	Springtime In Nagasaki	Series: Five Atomic Seasons
2006	2007	studio	Madcap's Flaming Duty	
2007	2007	studio	Summer In Nagasaki	Series: Five Atomic Seasons
2007	2007	studio	One Times One	
1977	2006	live	Detroit–March 31st 1977	Series: Bootmoon
1980	2008	studio	Preston- November 5th 1980	Series: Bootmoon
1982–2006	2006	studio	Tangerine Dream Plays Tangerine Dream	Unique tracks: "Southpole Crossing"; remixes
2008	2008	studio	Purple Diluvial	
2008	2008	studio	Views from a Red Train	
2008	2008	studio	The Anthology Decades	
2008	2008	studio	Tangram 2008	
2008	2008	studio	Hyperborea 2008	
2008	2008	studio	Autumn in Hiroshima	Series: Five Atomic Seasons
2008–2009	2009	studio	Flame	
2008–2009	2009	studio	Chandra - The Phantom Ferry Part I	
2009	2009	live	Live @ Dussmann Berlin	
2009	2009	studio	Winter in Hiroshima	Series: Five Atomic Seasons
1975–2010	2010	studio	DM V	Series: Dream Mixes
2010	2010	live	Zeitgeist Concert	
2010	2010	studio	Under Cover – Chapter One	
2010	2010	studio	The Endless Season	Series: Five Atomic Seasons
2011	2011	studio	The Island of the Fay	Series: Eastgate's Sonic Poems
2011	2011	studio	The Angel of the West Window	Series: Eastgate's Sonic Poems
2011	2011	live	The Gate of Saturn— Tangerine Dream Live at the Lowry Manchester 2011	
2011	2011	studio	Finnegans Wake	Series: Eastgate's Sonic Poems
2011	2011	live	Knights of Asheville	
2012	2012	live	Live at Admiralspalast Berlin	
2013	2013	live	Cruise to Destiny	
2011	2013	live	Starmus — Sonic Universe	with Brian May
2013	2013	studio	Lost in Strings — Volume I	
2013	2013	studio	Franz Kafka — The Castle	Series: Eastgate's Sonic Poems
2014	2014	studio	Chandra - The Phantom Ferry Part II	
2014	2014	live	Sorcerer 2014	
2014	2014	live	Phaedra Farewell Tour 2014	
The Quantum Years
2014	2015	live	Supernormal	
2016	2016	live	Live at the Philharmony Szczecin-Poland	
2014-2016	2017	studio	Quantum Gate	First studio album after Edgar Froese's death
2016	2019	live	Live at Augusta Raurica Switzerland 2016	
2020-2021	2022	studio	Raum	
1975	2022	live	Live in Reims Cinema Opera - September 23rd, 1975	Live performance of what eventually became the Ricochet album, released for Record Store Day 2022
2022	2025	live	From Virgin To Quantum Years (Coventry Cathedral 22)	
2024	2025	live	Todays Festival Session 2024 Turin	

== Mini-albums and EPs ==
Recorded	Released	Type	Album	Notes
1982; 1997	1997	studio	Das Mädchen auf der Treppe	Remixed tracks from: Das Mädchen auf der Treppe (1982)
2006	2006	studio	40 Years Roadmap to Music	
2006	2006	studio	Metaphor	First studio release following the departure of Jerome Froese
2007	2007	studio	Sleeping Watches Snoring in Silence	
2007	2007	studio	One Night in Space	
2008	2008	studio	Choice	
2008	2008	studio	Das Romantische Opfer	
2011	2011	studio	The Gate of Saturn	
2011	2011	studio	Mona Da Vinci	
2004–2005	2012	studio	Machu Picchu	
2014	2014	studio	Josephine the Mouse Singer	
2014	2014	studio	Mala Kunia	First studio release featuring Ulrich Schnauss
2014	2015	studio	Zero Gravity	with Jean-Michel Jarre
2014-2015	2015	studio	Quantum Key	First studio release after Edgar Froese's death
2016	2016	live; studio	Particles	
2017	2017	live	The Sessions I	
2008	2018	studio	Run To Vegas / Leviathan	12" single for Record Store Day 2018
2017	2018	live	The Sessions II	
2017-2018	2018	live	The Sessions III	
2018	2018	live	The Sessions IV	
2017-2018	2019	live	The Sessions V	
2018	2020	live	The Sessions VI	
2019	2021	live	The Sessions VII	
2021?	2021	studio	Probe 6-8	
2021	2023	live	The Sessions VIII	
2025	2025	live	Katowice Session 2025	

== Singles ==
Recorded	Released	Type	Single(s)	Notes
1971	1971	studio	"Ultima Thule"	
1973	1974	promo; studio	"Mysterious Semblance at the Strand of Nightmares"; "Phaedra"	Album: Phaedra
1975	1975	promo; studio	"Extracts from Rubycon"	Album: Rubycon
1975	1975	studio	"Ricochet (Part I)"; "Ricochet (Part II)"	Album: Ricochet
1975	1975	studio	"Excerpt from Ricochet"	Album: Ricochet
1976	1976	studio	"Stratosfear"; "The Big Sleep in Search of Hades"	Album: Stratosfear
1977	1977	promo; soundtrack	"Betrayal"; "Betrayal"	Album: Sorcerer
1977	1977	soundtrack	"Betrayal"; "Grind"	Album: Sorcerer
1977	1977	promo; soundtrack	"Betrayal"; "Search"	Album: Sorcerer
1977	1977	soundtrack	"Grind"; "Betrayal"	Album: Sorcerer
1977	1977	soundtrack	"Grind"; "Impressions of Sorcerer"	Album: Sorcerer
1977	1977	studio	"Monolight"; "Coldwater Canyon"	Album: Encore
1977	1977	studio	"Monolight"	Album: Encore
1977	1977	promo; studio	"Monolight"; "Hobo March"	Album: Encore
1977	1977	studio	"Encore"; "Hobo March"	Album: Encore
1978	1978	promo; studio	"Bent Cold Sidewalk"	Album: Cyclone
1978	1978	promo; studio	"Rising Runner Missed by Endless Sender"	Album: Cyclone
1979	1979	promo; studio	"Excerpts from Force Majeure"	Album: Force Majeure
1980	1980	promo; studio	"Tangram Part I-IV"	Album: Tangram
1980	1981	promo; soundtrack	"Dr. Destructo"; "Diamond Diary"	Album: Thief
1980	1981	promo; soundtrack	"Beach Scene"; "Burning Bar"	Album: Thief
1981	1981	studio	"Choronzon"; "Network 23"	Album: Exit
1983	1983	soundtrack	"Daydream"; "Moorland"	
1983	1983	promo; studio	"Cinnamon Road"; "Hyperborea"	Album: Hyperborea
1983	1984	promo; soundtrack	"Love on a Real Train"; "Guido the Killer Pimp"	Album: Risky Business
1983	1984	soundtrack	"Flashpoint"; "Going West"	Album: Flashpoint
1983	1984	live	"Warsaw in the Sun"	Album: Poland (UK Chart position: #96)
1985	1985	studio	"Streethawk"	Album: Le Parc
1985	1985	promo; studio	"Tiergarten"; "Streethawk"	Album: Le Parc
1986	1986	studio	"Dolphin Dance"	Album: Underwater Sunlight; Unique tracks: "Dolphin Smile"
1987	1987	studio	"A Time for Heroes"	
1987	1987	studio	"Tyger"; "21st Century Common Man"	Album: Tyger
1988	1988	soundtrack	"Dancing on a White Moon"; "Shy People"	Album: Shy People
1988	1988	promo; studio	"Marakesh"	Album: Optical Race
1988	1988	promo; studio	"Cat Scan"; "Ghazal"; "Optical Race"	Album: Optical Race
1988	1988	promo; studio	"Optical Race"; "Mothers of Rain"; "Sun Gate"; "Ghazal"	Album: Optical Race
1988	1989	live; single	"House of the Rising Sun"	7" flexi disk published in Reflex magazine
1989	1989	soundtrack	"Alexander Square"	Album: Destination Berlin
1990	1990	promo; studio	"Oranges Don't Dance"	Album: Melrose
1990	1990	promo; studio	"Desert Train"	Album: Melrose
1991–1992	1992	studio	"Rockoon Special Edition"	Album: Rockoon
1991–1992	1992	promo; studio	"Big City Dwarves"	Album: Rockoon
1992	1993	studio	"Dreamtime"	Album: 220 Volt Live; Unique tracks: "Dreamtime (Vocal version)"; "Purple Haze"
1993–1994	1994	studio	"Midwinter Night"	Album: Turn of the Tides
1993–1994	1994	studio	"Turn of the Tides CD-5"	Album: Turn of the Tides
1973–1983; 1994	1994	promo; studio	"Tangerine Dream"	Album: Tangents
1996	1996	studio	"Towards the Evening Star"	Album: Goblin's Club (UK chart position: #95)
1996	1996	live	"Shepherds Bush"	
1996	1997	studio	"Towards the Evening Star"	Album: Goblin's Club; Unique tracks: "Towards the Evening Star (Mandarin Cream Remix)" by The Orb
	1997	studio	"Limited World Tour Edition 1997"	
1998	1998	studio	"Ça Va–Ça Marche–Ça Ira Encore"	
1998	1998	studio	"Sony Center Topping Out Ceremony Score"	
1980–2000	1999	studio	"Meng Tian"	Album: The Past Hundred Moons
1977–2000	1999	studio	"Stereolight"	Album: The Past Hundred Moons
1983–2000	1999	studio	"Astrophobia"	Album: The Past Hundred Moons
1979–2003	2003	studio	"Astoria Theatre London"	Tracks from: Mota Atma; DM 4
1980–2003	2003	live	"DM4" (Bonus Disc)	
1990	2004	live	"East" (Bonus Disc)	
1974–2005	2005	studio	"Space Flight Orange"	
2007	2007	promo; studio	"Madcap's Flaming Promo"	Album: Madcap's Flaming Duty
2007	2007	studio	"Bells of Accra"	
2008	2008	studio	"Armageddon in the Rose Garden Part 1"	
2008	2008	studio	"Armageddon in the Rose Garden"	Tracks from: "Armageddon in the Rose Garden Part 1"; Purple Diluvial
2008	2008	studio	"Fallen Angels"	
2009	2009	studio	"A Cage in Search of a Bird"	
2010	2010	studio	"Zeitgeist"	

== Soundtracks ==
Recorded	Released	Type	Album	Notes
1971	2005, 2022	soundtrack	Vampira	
1977	1977	soundtrack	Sorcerer	UK Albums Chart: No. 25; US Billboard 200: No. 153
1980	1981	soundtrack	Thief	UK Albums Chart: No. 43; US Billboard 200: No. 115
1981	2022	soundtrack	Strange Behavior	Previously unreleased score to the 1981 film
1982	1982	soundtrack	Das Mädchen auf der Treppe	German Singles Chart: No. 13
1982	2020	soundtrack	The Soldier	Previously unreleased score to the 1982 film
1983	1983	soundtrack	Wavelength	
1983	1984	soundtrack	Risky Business	
1983	1984	soundtrack	Firestarter	
1983	1984	soundtrack	Flashpoint	
1983	1995; 1997	soundtrack; studio	The Keep	
1984	1985	soundtrack	Heartbreakers	
1984	1991	soundtrack	The Park Is Mine	
1985	1986	soundtrack	Legend	
1986	1991	soundtrack	Canyon Dreams	Video certified Platinum by the RIAA
1987	1987	soundtrack	Three O'Clock High	
1987	1988	soundtrack	Near Dark	
1987	1988	soundtrack	Shy People	
1987	1992	soundtrack	Deadly Care	
1988	1989	soundtrack	Miracle Mile	
1988	1991	soundtrack	Dead Solid Perfect	
1989	1989	soundtrack	Destination Berlin	
1989	1991	soundtrack	L'Affaire Wallraff (The Man Inside)	
1989	1994	soundtrack	Catch Me If You Can	
1991	1991	soundtrack	Rumpelstiltskin	
1992–1998	1998	soundtrack	The Hollywood Years Vol. 1	unused soundtrack for dozens of films
1992–1998	1998	soundtrack	The Hollywood Years Vol. 2	unused soundtrack for dozens of films
1994	1996	soundtrack	Zoning	
1996	1997	soundtrack	Oasis	
1997	1997	audio novel	Der Meteor	
1997	1998	soundtrack	Transsiberia	
1999	1999	soundtrack	What a Blast	Released as Architecture in Motion in 1999
1999	1999	soundtrack	Great Wall of China	
2001–2002	2004	soundtrack	L'Inferno	Series: Dante
2003	2003	soundtrack	Mota Atma	
2013	2013	soundtrack	The Music of Grand Theft Auto V: Volume 2 The Score	Co-composed with Woody Jackson, The Alchemist and Oh No
2013	2013	soundtrack	The Cinematographic Score: GTA5	Contains Tangerine Dream's initial contributions sent to Rockstar Games for Grand Theft Auto V before inputs from other composers were addressed

== Videos ==
Recorded	Released	Type	Album	Notes
1986	1987	video	Canyon Dreams	
1990–1992	1993	video	Three Phase	Live and studio; video from the 25 October 1992 concert in Seattle
1996	1997	video	Oasis	
1995	1997	video	The Video Dream Mixes	Series: Dream Mixes
1990–1992	2003	video; live	Live In America 1992	re-release of Three Phase on DVD
2001–2002	2004	video	L'Inferno	Series: Dante; silent film with a score from the album
2002	2006	video	Dante's Inferno	Series: Dante; 23 and 24 August 2002 concert of Inferno in Burg Nideggen
2006	2006	video	Live at the Tempodrome Berlin	21 September 2006 concert at the Tempodrome in Berlin
1975	2007	video	Live at Coventry Cathedral 1975	4 October 1975 concert at Coventry Cathedral; due to loss of the audio track, tracks from Ricochet were dubbed
2005	2007	video	35th Phaedra Anniversary Concert	11 June 2005 concert at Shepherd's Bush Empire in London
2006	2007	video	Madcap's Flaming Duty	studio video performance of Madcap's Flaming Duty
2007	2007	video	London Astoria Club Concert 2007	20 April 2007 concert at the Astoria Club in London
2007	2007	video	Orange Odyssey	1 July 2007 concert at the Paul Wunderlich Museum in Eberswald
2007	2007	video	One Night In Space	7 October 2007 concert at the Alte Oper in Frankfurt
2008	2008	video	The Epsilon Journey	13 April 2008 concert at the Technical University in Eindhoven
2008	2008	video	Loreley	18 July 2008 concert at the Loreley Rock at St. Goarshausen
2008	2009	live; video	The London Eye Concert	1 November 2008 concert at The Forum in London
2008	2009	live; video	The London Eye Concert bonus DVD	7 November 2008 concert in Los Angeles
2009	2009	live; video	Rocking Out the Bats	30 August 2009 concert at the Citadel Music Festival at the Zitadelle Spandau in Berlin
2009	2010	live; video	Izu	5 September 2009 concert in Izu, Japan
2010	2010	live; video	Live In Lisbon	25 March 2010 concert at the Coliseu in Lisbon
2012	2012	live; video	Live in Budapest at Béla Bartók National Concert Hall	10 April 2012 concert at the Béla Bartók National Concert Hall in Budapest

== Sampler albums ==
Tangerine Dream tracks have appeared on a number of sampler albums. These particular samplers are unique in that they contain tracks that never appeared on any other official Tangerine Dream release, although some have been released on the Tangerine Tree fan project:

Recorded	Released	Type	Album	Notes
1971	1971	live	Ossiach Live	Unique tracks: "Oszillator Planet Concert"; Released on Tangerine Tree 59.2
1975	1975	sampler	V	Unique tracks: "Overture"; Released on Tangerine Tree 41
1985	1986	sampler	Jubileumcassette	Unique tracks: "Horns of Doom"
1989	1989	sampler	Electronische Muziek 1989	Unique tracks: "Lost Tale"

== Compilations and sets ==
Recorded	Released	Type	Album	Notes
1971–1973	1975	set	Alpha Centauri/Atem	Albums: Alpha Centauri; Atem
1971–1980	1980	compilation	'70–'80	Tracks from: Alpha Centauri; Zeit; Atem; Phaedra; Rubycon; Ricochet; Stratosfear; Sorcerer; Encore; Cyclone; Force Majeure; Tangram; Unique tracks: "Monolight (Single Version)"; "Baryll Blue"; "Chimes and Chains"; "Haunted Heights"
1973–1983	1985	compilation	Dream Sequence	Tracks from: Phaedra; Rubycon; Ricochet; Stratosfear; Encore; Force Majeure; Tangram; Thief; Exit; White Eagle; Logos Live; Hyperborea; Risky Business
1969–1973	1985	set	In the Beginning	Albums: Electronic Meditation; Alpha Centauri; Zeit; Atem; Green Desert; First release of Green Desert released separately in next year.
1969–1973	1987	compilation	The Collection	Tracks from: Electronic Meditation; Alpha Centauri; Zeit; Atem; Green Desert
1969–1987	1989	compilation	The Best of Tangerine Dream	Tracks from: Atem; Green Desert; Poland; Le Parc; Underwater Sunlight; Tyger; Livemiles; Electronic Meditation; Alpha Centauri; Zeit
1974–1975	1990	set	Synthetiseur	Albums: Phaedra; Rubycon; Ricochet
	1991	compilation	From Dawn 'til Dusk	Tracks from: Zeit; Atem; Le Parc; Underwater Sunlight; Tyger; Livemiles
1988–1992	1992	compilation	The Private Music of Tangerine Dream	Tracks from: Optical Race; Miracle Mile; Lily on the Beach; Melrose; Unique tracks: "Beaver Town"; "Roaring of the Bliss"; Spanish Albums Chart: No. 93
1977–1979	1992	set	(3)	Albums: Encore; Cyclone; Force Majeure
1985–1989	1993	compilation	Dream Music – The Movie Music of Tangerine Dream	Tracks from: The Park Is Mine; Deadly Care; Dead Solid Perfect
1969–1987	1993	compilation	The Story of Tangerine Dream	Tracks from: Electronic Meditation; Atem; Green Desert; Poland; Le Parc; Underwater Sunlight; Tyger; Livemiles
1973–1984; 1994	1994	compilation; studio	Tangents	Reworked tracks from: Phaedra; Rubycon; Ricochet; Stratosfear; Encore; Force Majeure; Tangram; Exit; White Eagle; Logos Live; Hyperborea; Pergamon; Sorcerer; Thief; Risky Business; Wavelength; Firestarter; Flashpoint; Unique tracks: "Vulcano"; "The Jogger"; "South Dakota"; "Coppercoast"; "Great Barrier Reef"; "The Night at Ayers Rock"; "Afternoon on the Nile"; "Crane Routing"; "Silver Scale"; "Jamaican Monk"
1969–1987	1994	set	Collection	Albums: Poland; Tyger; The Best of Tangerine Dream
1969–1987	1995	compilation	Atmospherics	Tracks from: Electronic Meditation; Alpha Centauri; Atem; Green Desert; Le Parc; Underwater Sunlight; Tyger
1975	1995	set	Rubycon/Ricochet	Albums: Rubycon; Ricochet
1985–1989	1995	compilation	Dream Music 2	Tracks from: Heartbreakers; Dead Solid Perfect; Catch Me If You Can; Covers of tracks from: Legend; Dead Solid Perfect; Streethawk; Risky Business
	1995	compilation	Book of Dreams	Reworked tracks from: Electronic Meditation; Alpha Centauri; Zeit; Atem; Green Desert; Poland; Le Parc; Underwater Sunlight; Tyger; Livemiles
1974–1976	1996	compilation	Tangerine Dream	Tracks from: Phaedra; Rubycon; Stratosfear
1969–1988; 1995–1996	1996	compilation	The Dream Roots Collection	Tracks from: Electronic Meditation; Alpha Centauri; Zeit; Atem; Green Desert; Poland; Le Parc; Underwater Sunlight; Tyger; Livemiles; Unique tracks: "Valley of the Sun"; "Beach Bay Bunker"; "Vanishing Blue"; "Red Morpho"; remixes
1987–1994	1997	set	The Grammy Nominated Albums	Albums: Canyon Dreams; Rockoon; 220 Volt Live; Turn of the Tides; Tyranny of Beauty
1987–1994	1998	compilation	Luminous Visions	Tracks from: Turn of the Tides; The Dream Mixes; Goblins' Club; Oasis
1969–1973	1998	compilation	The Analogue Space Years	Tracks from: Electronic Meditation; Alpha Centauri; Zeit; Atem; Green Desert
1969–1973	1998	compilation	The Pink Years	Tracks from: Electronic Meditation; Alpha Centauri; Zeit; Atem; Green Desert
1988–1997	1998	compilation	Atlantic Bridges	Tracks from: Optical Race; Lily on the Beach; Melrose; Rockoon; Turn of the Tides; Tyranny of Beauty; The Dream Mixes; TimeSquare
1988–1997	1998	compilation	Atlantic Walls	Tracks from: Optical Race; Lily on the Beach; Melrose; Rockoon; Turn of the Tides; Tyranny of Beauty; The Dream Mixes; TimeSquare
1986–1997	1998	compilation; live	Dream Encores	Tracks from: "Rockoon Special Edition"; "Dreamtime (1993)"; Turn Of The Tides CD-5; "Shepherds Bush"; "Limited World Tour Edition 1997"; Optical Race; Melrose; Tyranny Of Beauty; The Dream Mixes; Goblins' Club; Unique tracks: "Order of the Ginger Guild"; "Eleanor Rigby"; "Oriental Haze (Single version)"; "Thief Yang and the Tangram Seal"; "Purple Haze (Single version)"; "Dominion (1986 version)"
1986–1998	1998	set	Dream Dice	Albums: Ambient Monkeys; Atlantic Bridges; Atlantic Walls; Dream Encores; The Dream Mixes; TimeSquare; The Hollywood Years Vol. 1; The Hollywood Years Vol. 2; Oasis; Quinoa; Tournado; Transsiberia; Ça Va–Ça Marche–Ça Ira Encore bonus CD
1983–1987	1998	compilation	The Blue Years	Tracks from: Poland; Le Parc; Underwater Sunlight; Tyger; Livemiles
1969–1972	1998	set	Three Classic Albums	Albums: Electronic Meditation; Alpha Centauri; Zeit
1973–1983	1999	compilation	Tangerine Dream	Tracks from: Phaedra; Stratosfear; Encore; Force Majeure; Thief; Exit; Hyperborea; Risky Business
1988–1999	2000	compilation	Tang-go	Tracks from: Optical Race; Lily on the Beach; Melrose; Rockoon; Tyranny of Beauty; The Dream Mixes; Tournado; TimeSquare; The Hollywood Years Vol. 2; Transsiberia; Ça Va–Ça Marche–Ça Ira Encore; Valentine Wheels; What a Blast; Mars Polaris; Great Wall of China
1970–1990	2000	compilation; live	i-Box	Remixed tracks from: Alpha Centauri; Zeit; Atem; Green Desert; Encore; Quichotte; Logos Live; Hyperborea; Poland; Le Parc; Underwater Sunlight; Tyger; Livemiles; Live versions of tracks from: Exit; Warsaw in the Sun; Legend; Optical Race; Lily on the Beach; Melrose; Unique tracks: "Longing for Cashba"; "Unicorn Saga"; "Akash Deep"; "Iguana"
1969–1987	2002	compilation	Journey Through a Burning Brain	Tracks from: Electronic Meditation; Alpha Centauri; Zeit; Atem; Green Desert; Poland; Le Parc; Underwater Sunlight; Tyger; Livemiles
1988–1997	2004	set	High Voltage	Albums: Atlantic Walls; Atlantic Bridges; Valentine Wheels; Tournado
1997	2004	set	Lamb with Radar Eyes	Albums: Valentine Wheels; Tournado
1969–1986	2004	compilation	An Introduction To....	Tracks from: Electronic Meditation; Alpha Centauri; Zeit; Atem; Green Desert; Poland; Le Parc; Underwater Sunlight
1986	2005	box; live	Vault IV	Albums: Cleveland–June 24th 1986; Brighton–March 25th 1986
1969–1987	2006	compilation	The Essential Collection	Tracks from: Electronic Meditation; Alpha Centauri; Zeit; Atem; Green Desert; Poland; Le Parc; Underwater Sunlight; Tyger; Livemiles
1973–1983	2006	compilation	The Essential	Tracks from: Phaedra; Rubycon; Stratosfear; Force Majeure; Tangram; Hyperborea
1967–1973	2006	set	Nebulous Dawn	Albums: Electronic Meditation; Alpha Centauri; Zeit; Ultima Thule; Atem; "Lady Greengrass/Love of Mine" (The Ones)
2001–2005	2007	compilation	The Dante Arias Collection	Tracks from: Inferno; Purgatorio; Paradiso
2001–2005	2007	compilation	The Dante Song Collection	Tracks from: Inferno; Purgatorio; Paradiso
1992–1994	2007	compilation	Starbound Collection	Tracks from: Rockoon; 220 Volt Live; Turn of the Tides; Tyranny of Beauty
1985–1999	2007	compilation	Silver Siren Collection	Tracks from: What a Blast; i-Box
1982–2006	2007	compilation	Ocean Waves Collection	Tracks from: Quinoa; 220 Volt Live; The Keep; Antique Dreams; Unique tracks: "Oceanride"
1989–2006	2007	compilation	The Soft Dream Decade	Tracks from: Destination Berlin; Transsiberia; Great Wall of China; The Seven Letters from Tibet; The Melrose Years; Mota Atma; Arizona Live; Blue Dawn
1986–1997	2007	compilation	Cyberjam Collection	Tracks from: Goblins' Club; Limited World Tour Edition 1997; TimeSquare; i-Box
1999	2007	compilation	Mars Mission Counter	Tracks from: Mars Polaris; Great Wall of China; Unique tracks: "Dies Martis" alternate version of "Dies Martis (TransMercury)"
1987–1999	2007	compilation	Canyon Cazuma	Tracks from: Canyon Dreams; Oasis
1995–2006	2007	compilation; studio	DM 2.1	Tracks from: The Dream Mixes; TimeSquare; Unique tracks: "Pixel Pirates (Long Original Version)"; "Paranormal Skills"
1992–1998	2007	compilation	Hollywood Lightning	Albums: The Hollywood Years Vol. 1; The Hollywood Years Vol. 2
1973–1986	2007	compilation	Antique Dream Land	Track from: Antique Dreams; i-Box
	2007	compilation; studio	Booster	Tracks from: Ça Va–Ça Marche–Ça Ira Encore; Space Flight Orange; 40 Years Roadmap to Music; Blue Dawn; Metaphor; Sleeping Watches Snoring in Silence; Bells of Accra; One Night In Space; Remixed tracks from: Tangram; Logos Live; Unique tracks: "Logos (Velvet Part 2007)"; "Tangram Chin Part"; "All Thirsty Angels Pass"; "Big Sur and the Oranges from Heironymus Bosch"
1983–2000	2007	compilation	Tangines Scales	Tracks from: Poland; Underwater Sunlight; Livemiles; Optical Race; Miracle Mile; Turn of the Tides; i-Box; Unique tracks: "House of the Rising Sun (Southend Mix)"
1967–2008	2008	compilation	The Electronic Magic of Tangerine Dream	Tracks from: "Lady Greengrass/Love of Mine" (The Ones); "Ultima Thule"; The Anthology Decades; Phaedra 2005; Epsilon in Malaysian Pale (Edgar Froese); Unique tracks: "Asteroid Agenda"; "Rare Bird (Live 1988)"
2008	2008	compilation; studio	Booster II	Tracks from: Tangents; One Times One; Views from a Red Train; The Anthology Decades; Hyperborea 2008; Fallen Angels; Autumn In Hiroshima; Choice; Unique tracks: "Cloudburst Flight 2008"; "A Streetcar Named Desire"; "The Last Wave"; "La Boca Race"; "Tomorrow Never Knows"; "Sunshift"; "Beyond the Cottage and the Lake"
2002	2009	compilation	The Independent Years	Tracks from: The Melrose Years
1999–2005	2009	compilation	Axiat	Tracks from: Great Wall of China; The Seven Letters from Tibet; The Past Hundred Moons; DM 4; Jeanne d'Arc
1994–2008	2009	compilation	Vintage Vanguard	Remixed tracks from: Turn of the Tides; Goblins' Club; Purgatorio; Inferno; Zoning; Melrose; 40 Years Roadmap to Music; DM 4; Unique tracks: "Crossed Fingers"
1987–2009	2009	compilation	Ballads	Tracks from: Rockface; Canyon Dreams; Oasis; Ambient Monkeys; Transsiberia; The Hollywood Years Vol. 1; The Hollywood Years Vol. 2; The Seven Letters from Tibet; Mars Polaris; i-Box; Inferno; The Melrose Years; Mota Atma; Purgatorio; Paradiso; Kyoto; Metaphor; Plays Tangerine Dream; Springtime in Nagasaki; Summer in Nagasaki; Autumn in Hiroshima
2008–2009	2009	compilation; studio	Booster III	Tracks from: Views from A Red Train; Das Romantische Opfer; Fallen Angels; Flame; Chandra; A Cage In Search of a Bird; Winter In Hiroshima; Unique tracks: "Mombasa"; "The Halloween Cast (Rolling Out The World's Pumpkin Part 1)"; "Kiev Mission (Remake 2009)"; "Kilimandscharo"; "The Angel of the West Window"
1988–2009	2009	compilation; studio	Music For Sports- Cool Races	Tracks from: Orange Light Years; Flame; Optical Race; Blue Dawn; Ambient Highway Vol. 3; Beyond the Storm; Unique tracks: "The Last Goal"; "The First Curve"
1997–2008	2009	compilation; studio	Music For Sports- Power and Motion	Tracks from: Transsiberia; Ambient Highway Vol. 1; Dalinetopia; One Times One; The Anthology Decades
1971–2008	2010	compilation; studio	Mysterious Semblance at the Strand of Nightmares	Tracks from: The Anthology Decades; Phaedra 2005; Epsilon in Malaysian Pale (Edgar Froese); "Lady Greengrass/Love of Mine" (The Ones); "Ultima Thule"
1967–2008	2010	compilation; studio	Run to Vegas	Tracks from: The Anthology Decades; Phaedra 2005; Epsilon in Malaysian Pale (Edgar Froese)
1982–2006	2010	set	The Electronic Journey	Albums: The Seven Letters rom Tibet; Starbound Collection; Silver Siren Collection; Ocean Waves Collection; Transsiberia; Cyberjam Collection; The Dante Song Collection; Canyon Cazuma; Tangines Scales; The Independent Years
1974–1978	2011	set	The Virgin Years 1974-1978	Albums: Phaedra; Rubycon; "Extracts from Rubycon"; Ricochet; Stratosfear; "Stratosfear/The Big Sleep in Search of Hades"; Cyclone; Tracks: "Rubycon, Part Two" from '70-'80
2008–2011	2011	compilation; studio	Booster IV	Tracks from: Logos Live; Tyger; TimeSquare; Madcap's Flaming Duty; Purple Diluvial; Booster II; Flame; Izu; DM V; Zeitgeist; Zeitgeist Concert; The Endless Season; Unique tracks: "Alchemy Of The Heart 2010"; "Culpa Levis 2010"; "Warhol's New York Walk"; "A Snail's Dream"; "Arctic Sunrise"; "The Lion of the Law"; "Thorns from Heaven"
1969–1973	2011	compilation	Sunrise in the Third System	Tracks from: Electronic Meditation; Alpha Centauri; Ultima Thule; Zeit; Atem; Green Desert
1980–1988	2011	compilation	Ride on the Ray	Tracks from: Pergamon; Sohoman; Warsaw in the Sun; Le Parc; The Dream Roots Collection; Underwater Sunlight; Tyger; Livemiles
2010–2012	2012	compilation	Booster V	Tracks from: Sonic Poem Series; Zeitgeist; Mona da Vinci; The Endless Season; Remixed tracks: Calymba Caly; Rubycon 2010; Resurrection By The Spirit; View from a Distant Star; Unique tracks: "Shining Ray"; "Twilight Dance"; "Sailing Through the Night"; "Booster Battery"
1969–1973	2013	compilation	Decades: 70s	Tracks from: Electronic Meditation; Alpha Centauri; Ultima Thule; Zeit; Atem; Green Desert
1980–1987	2013	compilation	Decades: 1980s	Tracks from: Quichotte; Sohoman; Warsaw in the Sun; Le Parc; Underwater Sunlight; Tyger; Livemiles
1977–2013	2013	compilation	One Night in Africa	Tracks from: Bells Of Accra; One Times One; Views From A Red Train; Booster III; DM V; Unique tracks: "Madagascar"; "Sahara Storm"; "Rain Prayer"; "Twilight In Abidjan"
1977–2013	2013	compilation	Booster VI	Tracks from: Sorcerer; The Keep; Optical Race; Transsiberia; Ça Va — Ça Marche — Ça Ira Encore; Antique Dreams; Plays Tangerine Dream; Finnegans Wake; Knights Of Asheville; One Night in Africa; The Cinematic Score GTA 5; Unique tracks: "Season Of The Birds"; "The Velvet Meridian"; "Dream Catcher"; "Agony Of Suspense"; "The Crystal Ship"
1983–1988	2014	compilation	The Best Of Tangerine Dream Live	Tracks from: Poland; Livemiles
	2015	compilation	Booster VII	Unique tracks: "Tamago Yaki 2015"; "Pilgrims to Elysium"; "Dnammoc Su" (Neat Mix); "The Light Cone 2015"; "Polar Radius"; "Heart Throb"; "A Matter of Time" (Red Canyon Remix); "Silvery Ice Lake"; "Morning Sun New"; "Le Combat Des Épées" (Director’s Cut)
	2015	compilation	Out of this World	Unique tracks "Ganymede's Kiss"
1974–1978	2019	set	In Search of Hades: The Virgin Recordings 1973 – 1979	Remastered: Phaedra; Rubycon; Ricochet; Stratosfear; Cyclone; Force Majeure; Unreleased: Victoria Palace Theatre (1974); The Rainbow Theatre (1974); Royal Albert Hall (1975); Oedipus Tyrannus; Coventry Cathedral (October 1975)
1980–1983	2020	set	Pilots of Purple Twilight: The Virgin Recordings 1980 – 1983	Albums: Tangram; Thief; Exit; White Eagle; The Soldier; Logos; Hyperborea; The Keep
