= Tangerine Dream bootleg recordings =

Tangerine Dream bootleg recordings are performances by Tangerine Dream that have attained some level of public circulation without being available as a legal release. The term most often refers to audio recordings, but also includes video performances. Bootleg recordings arise from a multitude of sources, including covertly copied live concerts, studio outtakes, broadcast performances. Some bootlegs have included material from official releases.

Tangerine Tree fan-based project releases are not considered bootlegs as they were sanctioned by Tangerine Dream from 2001 until 2006 when permission was rescinded. Most bootleg content is available as better recordings through the Tangerine Tree releases. Tree and official releases are listed as a reference to available material.

Keen Auricle is another fan project, but they did not have permission from the band and so are considered bootlegs.

== Live concerts ==
=== Essen 1968 ===
Tangerine Dream played at the Essener Songtage Festival at the Grugahalle in Essen on 29 September 1968. Keen Auricle released the concert as Rot Weiss (1999). The show was released on Tangerine Tree 59: Essen 1968 (2004)

=== Berlin 1973 ===
Keen Auricle released Ein Finale in Elektronik (2002), a concert at the Deutschlandhalle in Berlin on 28 November 1973. This concert was released on Tangerine Tree 23: Berlin 1972 (2003).

=== Reims 1974 ===
Tangerine Dream performed on 13 December 1974 at Reims Cathedral in France. The two CD bootleg Live! Improvised (1992) contains a high quality version of most of the concert. A remastered version was released as Tangerine Tree 30: Reims 1974.

=== London 1975 ===
Tangerine Dream toured France and the UK in 1975, resulting in the album Ricochet (1975). The show at the Royal Albert Hall in London on 2 April 1975 was released as the bootleg Coefficient Of Aural Expansion (1994). Another bootleg is Phaedream (1997), which also includes a track from Neuronium. The full concert was released on Tangerine Tree Volume 9: London 1975 (2002) and a remastered version officially released as The Bootleg Box Set, vol. 1, London 1975.

=== Orange 1975 ===
Tangerine Dream played at the Théâtre antique d'Orange in France on 16 August 1975. The bootleg A Dream Unbound (1988) consists of a 12" and a 7" LP that were pressed from a multi-generational copy of an audience recording. A later pressing was released as Seekers Of Dreams (1988). The full remastered concert was released on Tangerine Tree 22: Orange 1975 (2003) using a remastered version of the original tape.

=== Brussels 1976 ===
Tangerine Dream played in Brussels twice in 1976— at Auditorium Paul-Emile Janson at Université Libre de Bruxelles on 9 February 1976 and at Ancienne Belgique on 16 November 1976. The bootleg CD Danger Live (1992) includes an hour of quality content from the university concert and ten minutes from the Ancienne Belgique concert. The bootleg was reissued in 1993. The concerts were released on Tangerine Tree 27: Brussels 1976 (2003) and Tangerine Tree 31: Brussels 1976 (2003).

=== London 1976 ===
On 7 June 1976, Tangerine Dream played at the Royal Albert Hall in London. Disc one of the bootleg CD set3 Tier Dream (1993), titled "Analogue Days", includes sixty minutes of music. The entire concert was released on Tangerine Tree 34: London 1976 (2003)

=== Nottingham 1976 ===
During the Stratosfear tour, Tangerine Dream played at Albert Hall, Nottingham on 8 November 1976. The bootleg CD Me-Rad (1992) is the first part of the Argonautica Americana series, although the concert played in England. Collected Endings (1992) is the third part of Argonautica Americana and contains the final parts of Nottingham 1976 and Columbus 1988. The show was released as Tangerine Tree 1: Nottingham 1976 (2001) with an official release as The Bootleg Box Set, vol. 2, "Nottingham 1976" (2004).

=== Detroit 1977 ===
Tangerine Dream performed at the Ford Auditorium in Detroit on 31 March 1977. About 37 minutes of the concert was released on vinyl as The Emerald Beyond (1986). Later versions were released as Die Medianen von Zymbiola and The Dremas Are Known to You [sic] and attributed to concerts in Kansas and Seattle. A CD version was released as Acoustic LSD— Live in Seattle, USA The Emerald Beyond (1992). Keen Auricle released a complete version as Snackbar Dreamer in Detroit (2001). The entire concert was released on Tangerine Tree 25: Detroit 1977 (2003) with a remastered official release as The Bootmoon Series: Detroit— 31 March 1977 (2006).

=== Montreal 1977 ===
The concert at Place des Arts in Montreal on 9 April 1977 was broadcast on CHOM-FM. The bootleg has a cover titled Patrolling Space Borders (1996), while the CD itself is titled Laserium. Another bootleg is titled Escape From Earth. The full concert was released on Tangerine Tree 18: Montreal 1977 (2003).

=== Seattle 1977 ===
Tangerine Dream toured North America in 1977 to promote Encore, playing at the Paramount Theatre in Seattle on 21 April 1977. The bootleg LP was unlabeled, accompanying inserts were variously titled Babylon's Strange, Fotzenslecker and Netz-Lautstärke! The full concert was released as Tangerine Tree 39: Seattle 1977 (2004).

=== Berlin 1978 ===
Tangerine Dream played at the Eissporthalle in Berlin on 19 February 1978. The two LP Don't Walk— Dream Now (1996) was the last bootleg to be released on vinyl. The entire concert was released on Tangerine Tree 67: Berlin 1978 (2005).

=== London 1978 ===
The concert of 28 March 1978 was at the Hammersmith Odeon in London. Keen Auricle released the concert as Balayndagar Ballet (2000) on two CDs. The concert was remastered on Tangerine Tree 92: London 1978 (2006)

=== Berlin 1980 ===
Tangerine Dream performed two shows on 31 January 1980 at the Palace of the Republic in East Berlin and both shows were broadcast on radio. The bootleg Staatsgrenze West LP was released in September 1980 using material from the second show. Part of the first show was released by Amiga as Quichotte (1980) and by Virgin as Pergamon (1986). A low quality unlicensed copy of Quichotte was released as Don Quixote (1988). The complete versions of both shows were released on Tangerine Tree 17: East Berlin 1980 (2003).

=== Preston 1980 ===
The band performed at the Guildhall in Preston, England on 5 November 1980. The first 40 minutes were bootlegged on LP as Undulation (1986), with a later CD version misnamed Soundtrack For Fantasy, Live in Detroit, USA Undulation (1992). Some of the Undulation LPs were relabeled Edison's Last Playoff (1993). Space Trucking (1986) contains material from both the Preston 1980 and Newcastle 1981 concerts. The full concert was released on Tangerine Tree 62: Preston 1980 (2005) and a remastered official release on The Bootmoon Series: Preston– 5 November 1980 (2006).

=== Brighton 1981 ===
Tangerine Dream played at the Dome in Brighton on 17 October 1981. Soundchecks 1981 (2001) is a Keen Auricle release of the soundchecks for this concert and London 1981. The full concert was released on Tangerine Leaves 14: Brighton 1981 (2003) and the soundchecks were released on Tangerine Tree 86: Soundchecks 1981-96 (2006).

=== London 1981 ===
Tangerine Dream played at the Hammersmith Odeon in London on 20 October 1981. The concert was bootlegged on disc two of the CD set 3 Tier Dream (1993), titled "Digital Times". Soundchecks 1981 (2001) is a Keen Auricle release of the soundchecks for this concert and Brighton 1981. The entire concert was released on Tangerine Tree 89: London 1981 and the soundchecks were released on Tangerine Tree 86: Soundchecks 1981-96 (2006).

=== Newcastle 1981 ===
The bootleg LP Space & Spheres contains about 40 minutes of the concert at the Newcastle City Hall performed on 25 October 1981. Space Trucking (1986) contains material from both the Preston 1980 and Newcastle 1981 concerts. The entire concert was released on Tangerine Tree 10: Newcastle 1981 (2002) and a remastered official release on The Bootleg Box Set, vol. 2, "Newcastle 1981" (2004).

=== Sydney 1982 ===
The band toured Australia in 1982, with a performance at the Regent Theatre in Sydney on 22 February 1982. The bootleg LP Leprous Appearance On Wednesday (1984) was produced from a radio broadcast of the concert and released in 1984. It was mis-attributed as Melbourne 24.2.82. A CD remaster was released as Dreaming (1994) and included "Ultima Thule, Part One" from Ultima Thule. The concert was officially released in a remixed version on Sohoman (1999). The full concert was released on Tangerine Tree 37: Sydney 1982 (2003) with a remastered official release on The Bootmoon Series: Sydney– 22 February 1982 (2004).

=== Munich 1982 ===
The group played at the Cirkus-Krone-Bau in Munich on 12 November 1982. The concert was released by Keen Auricle as Meister der Insel (1999).

=== Berlin 1982 ===
Tangerine Dream played on 15 November 1982 at the Internationales Congress Centrum Berlin. Part of the concert was released on the bootleg CD Logotypes (1997). Keen Auricle released the full concert on Berlin ICC 1982 (2002), sourced from a soundboard recording. The full concert was released on Tangerine Tree 61: Berlin 1982.

=== Melbourne 1982 ===
Tangerine Dream played at Dallas Brooks Hall in Melbourne on 1 March 1982. The main part of the concert was released on the bootleg CD Rätikon (1994), along with tracks by Popol Vuh, Man and Brian Eno. The full concert was released on Tangerine Tree 48: Melbourne 1982 (2004).

=== Fassbinder 1983 ===
The band was preparing for a tour of Japan in June 1983, when director, writer and actor Rainer Werner Fassbinder died. A concert was performed at the Alte Oper in Frankfurt with about 35 minutes of material that had appeared on the albums Logos Live (1982), Poland (1984) and Kamikaze 1989 (1982). About 30 minutes of music were included on the bootleg LP Fassbinder Memorial Concert (1983). The entire concert was later released on Tangerine Tree 5: Frankfurt 1983 (2002) and a remastered version officially released as The Bootleg Box Set, vol. 2, "Fassbinder Memorial Concert" (2004).

=== London 1986 ===
Tangerine Dream played at the Hammersmith Odeon in London on 27 March 1986 as part of a European tour to promote Underwater Sunlight. The complete concert was released on the bootleg two LP set Timeless Space (1986), with the second LP later released as The Nameless is the Origin (1986).

=== Cologne 1986 ===
The band played at the Sendesaal concert hall at the WDR radio station in Cologne on 29 March 1986. The bootleg LP Relativity (1986) includes the first hour of the concert that was broadcast. Keen Auricle released a complete version of the concert as General Relativity (1999). Tangerine Tree 58: Cologne 1986 (2004) is a remastered version of the broadcast, while Tangerine Leaves 53: Cologne 1986 (2004) is a lower quality audience recording of the entire concert.

=== Paris 1986 ===
During the 1986 European tour, Tangerine Dream played at the Olympique in Paris on 31 March 1986. The bootleg LP Parisian Dreams (1990) was a well mastered copy of the first half of an audience recording with the second half released on Parisian Dreams Too (1990). Parisian Dreams was issued on the bootleg set 3 Tier Dream disc three titled "Paris Dreams", which also included the tracks from Das Mädchen auf der Treppe (1982). Parisian Dreams Too was released on CD as 3 Tier Dream On! (1994), which also included a version of "The Cliffs Of Sydney (Sydney)". The entire concert was released as Tangerine Tree 69: Paris 1986 (2005).

=== Laguna Hills 1986 ===
During the 1986 North American tour, Tangerine Dream played at the Irvine Meadows Amphitheater in Laguna Hills, California on 6 June 1986. Sonambulistic Imagery (1993) is a two CD bootleg set. The entire concert was released on Tangerine Tree 24: Laguna Hills 1986.

=== Toronto 1986 ===
On 21 June 1986, Tangerine Dream played at Massey Hall in Toronto, Canada. The two LP bootleg Undercover Dreams (1986) included part of the concert plus "Ultima Thule, Part One" (1971). The entire concert was released on Tangerine Tree 44: Toronto 1986 (2004). Keen Auricle released a complete version as Undercover Dreams' Uncle, with a remastered release as Undercover Dreams' Uncle v.2 (2004) that included "Ultima Thule, Part One".

=== Berlin 1987 ===
Tangerine Dream played at the Reichstag in Berlin on 1 August 1987. Antarktis (1993) includes a mix of content from Berlin 1987 and Bristol 1990. 20th Century Serenades (1993) is sourced from the second part of the radio broadcast of the concert; the CD itself is labeled 20th Century Heroes. Keen Auricle released Bon Anniversaire Berlin! (2001) from an audience recording. A remixed part of the concert was officially released on Livemiles (1988) and the full concert on Tangerine Tree 38: Berlin 1987 (2004).

=== Columbus 1988 ===
During the 1988 North American tour, Tangerine Dream played at the Ohio Theatre in Columbus. The show of 28 August 1988 was bootlegged on CD as Ardem 'O' (1992), part two of the Argonautica Americana series. Collected Endings (1992) is the third part of Argonautica Americana and contains the final parts of Nottingham 1976 and Columbus 1988. The entire concert was released as Tangerine Leaves 69: Columbus 1988. The concert date has sometimes been misidentified as 29 August 1988.

=== Detroit 1988 ===
The concert of 31 August 1988 was at the Pine Knob Music Theatre in Detroit. The bootleg CD Spherical Harmonics One (1994) was made from a soundboard recording.

=== New Haven 1988 ===
Tangerine Dream played at the Palace Theatre in New Haven on 9 September 1988. Keen Auricle released the show from a soundboard recording as At the Mountains of Madness v.2 (2002); the original 2001 release was mis-labeled as Boston 6.6.88. The full concert was released on Tangerine Tree 42: New Haven 1988 (2004).

=== New York 1988 ===
During the Optical Race tour, Tangerine Dream played at Radio City Music Hall, New York on 7 September 1988. The bootleg CD Sound and Effects (1992) contains a low quality recording. The last track was labeled "House Of The Rising Sun", played by Tangerine Dream as an encore at several concerts; the track is actually "Assassin" performed by Mark Shreeve. The full concert was released as Tangerine Tree 85: New York 1988 (2006).

=== Bristol 1990 ===
Tangerine Dream performed on 6 November 1990 at Colston Hall in Bristol, England. The bootleg LP Bicycle Race (1991) used a high quality audience recording. A 1992 reissue with the same cover contained heavy metal music with no TD content. The bootleg was reissued in 1993 as Singet, denn der Gesang vertreibt die Wölfe. Another bootleg CD of this concert was released as In den Gärten Pharaos/Bicycle Race (1992); the title is a reference to a Popol Vuh album. Antarktis (1993) includes a mix of content from Berlin 1987 and Bristol 1990. The full concert was released on Tangerine Tree 70: Bristol 1990 (2005).

=== Toronto 1992 ===
During the 1992 North American tour, Tangerine Dream played at the Music Hall in Toronto on 4 October 1992. An hour of quality content was released on the bootleg CD Dreaming On Danforth Avenue (1993). Music from the tour was officially released on 220 Volt Live (1993).

=== Filderstadt 1997 ===
Tangerine Dream played at Filderstadt on 14 April 1997. Keen Auricle released 17 minutes of the concert on Filderkraut (2001).

=== Munich 1997 ===
The band played at the Cirkus-Krone Bau in Munich on 12 April 1997. Keen Auricle used a DAT master in the release of Hacker-Pschorr (2000). A remastered version was released on Tangerine Tree 82: Munich 1997 (2006).

=== Bonn 1997 ===
Tangerine Dream played at the Beethovenhalle in Bonn on 11 April 1997. The concert was released by Keen Auricle as Konstrukteure des Zentrums (1999). The show was released on Tangerine Leaves 83: Bonn 1997 (2006).

== Soundtracks ==
Tangerine Dream scored a large number of films, but only a relatively small number have been officially released, and not all include the entire score.

=== Destination Berlin ===
Destination Berlin (1989) is a 360° movie scored by Tangerine Dream; the soundtrack release Destination Berlin (1989) was accompanied by singles titled Alexander Square on 7" and 12" vinyl and on CD-5. The 12" and CD-5 included a long version of the track "Alexander Square" that has never been re-released. The track has been released on the bootlegs Sol Et Luna (1994) and Electronic Orgy (1997).

=== Canyon Dreams ===
A LaserDisc video titled Canyon Dreams was scored by Tangerine Dream in 1987. The bootleg LP The Canyon Dreams (1991) used music from the LaserDisc. Canyon Dreams (1991) was officially released on CD shortly after the bootleg and used slightly different versions of music. The bootleg was reissued in 1992. The bootleg Electronic Orgy (1997) includes the track "Shadow Flyer". This track was also released on Tangerine Tree 63: Assorted Secrets 3 (2005).

=== City of Shadows ===
The soundtrack to City of Shadows a.k.a. Nightmare City (1987) has never been released. 70/90 (1990) and Electronic Orgy (1997) both include the end title song "Brother or Stranger". This track was released on Tangerine Tree 50: Assorted Secrets 2 (2004).

=== Daydream – Moorland ===
Daydream – Moorland (1983) is a soundtrack album from the TV series Tatort; the official release is available only on 7" vinyl, although there is a remixed version of "Moorland" (2000). The original tracks were released on the bootlegs 70/90 (1990) and Electronic Orgy (1997).

=== Flashpoint ===
The film Flashpoint (1984) was scored by Tangerine Dream and released as Flashpoint (1984). A CD version was released in 1984 on the Heavy Metal label, but soon recalled due to pressing errors that rendered the CD unplayable. The soundtrack would not be released on CD again until 1995, making it very rare. The entire album was released as part of the bootleg Mystery Tracks (1993).

=== Geradeaus bis zum Morgen ===
Geradeaus bis zum Morgen (1972) is a German movie with yet another unreleased soundtrack. The title track can be found on the bootleg Prayer of Quiet Dreams (1993). The track was released on Tangerine Tree 36: Assorted Secrets 1

=== Great Wall Of China ===
Great Wall of China (1999) includes "Meng Tian", "Summer In Shauxi" and "No More Candles Burning". These tracks are included on the unauthorized CD Electronic Collection (2001).

=== Heartbreakers ===
The Tangerine Dream score for the film Heartbreakers (1984) was released as Heartbreakers (1985); it quickly went out of print and was scarce until a re-release in 1995. The bootleg Prayer of Quiet Dreams (1993) includes "Footbridge To Heaven" and an alternate version of "Gemini". Sol Et Luna (1994) includes the entire album.

=== I Just Want to Rule My Own Life Without You ===
I Just Want to Rule My Own Life Without You (1991) is the soundtrack for an episode of the crime drama Tatort. The bootlegs Mystery Tracks (1993) and Electronic Orgy (1997) include "One Night In Medina" and "I Just Want to Rule My Own Life Without You (instrumental version)"; Electronic Orgy (1997) also includes "I Just Want to Rule My Own Life Without You (vocal version)".

=== The Keep ===
Tangerine Dream scored the film The Keep in 1983, but the first issue of the soundtrack The Keep (1997) was a limited run of 150 CDs sold at a concert in the UK. Virgin soon announced that the album would be available for general release in early 1998, but legal issues with the film studio stopped the release. In 1999, the TDI label sold 300 copies of the Millennium Booster album set that included The Keep with a different cover. Out of sixteen tracks on the official release, only four were actually used in the movie. The scarcity of the official release led to high resale prices. This and the lack of the actual film music has led to an unusual number of unofficial, bootleg and fan releases.

- 70/90 (1990); Includes two tracks from The Keep.
- Rare Trax 1 (1991); A Keen Auricle fan release which includes "Romanian Road" and "Gloria".
- The Keep (First Mix)
- The Complete Works of the Keep (1994)
- The Keep (1995) Boot Moon Records; Sourced from a studio master tape, a 1985 German radio broadcast and from the bootleg CD 70/90.
- Logotypes (1997); also known as Logos Types because of one of the cover titles.
- Electronic Orgy (1997); Includes the tracks "Fisherman's Morning", "Romanian Road", "Sailing Mission" and "Gloria".
- The Keep (1999), Event Horizon
- The Keep (2001) Orange Records; Used the sixteen tracks from the TDI release, plus tracks from Logos Live (1982), Tangents (1994), The Hollywood Years Vol. 2 (1997) and Antique Dreams (2000).
- The Keep Ultimate Edition (2001)
- The Keep (2003); A counterfeit version using the same cover and liner as the 1997 TDI release, but packaged in a standard jewel case instead of a digipak.
- Tangerine Dream— The Keep Cues; Contains seven untitled tracks. The album was published by Ricochet Dream as a release of 222 numbered CDs issued for fans attending the 2008 Ricochet Gathering in Transylvania, Romania to celebrate the 25th anniversary of the film.
- Tangerine Tree 54: The Keep: An Alternative View (2004); A Tangerine Tree fan release.
- Ricochet Gathering— Keep On (2010) Ricochet Dream
- The Keep; A CD-R version of the supposed promo LP
- The Complete Laserdisc Soundtrack to The Keep; Sourced from the laserdisc release of the film.

=== Legend ===
Tangerine Dream composed the score for the North American version of Legend (1985) and the soundtrack was released on LP as Legend (1986). Copyright issues delayed the CD release until 1995. Silva released the compilation Dream Music 2 (1995) with tracks from Legend performed by Mark Ayres. The bootleg CD Prayer of Quiet Dreams (1993) includes five tracks ripped from the LP. The bootlegs Electronic Orgy (1997) and Traumzeit (1998) include a version of "Unicorn Theme". An unauthorized version of Legend (2005) includes retitled tracks from the official CD, a track from Goblins' Club (1996), a live version of "Unicorn Theme" from a 1997 concert and an unrelated track by Eric Allaman.

=== Das Mädchen auf der Treppe ===
Das Mädchen auf der Treppe (1982) is an LP soundtrack album from the TV series Tatort. The 12" LP includes four tracks: "Das Mädchen auf der Treppe", a remix of "White Eagle" from White Eagle (1982), "Flock", "Katja" and "Speed". These particular versions have never been released on CD or other media, although remixed versions have been issued. The 12" LP was mislabeled as 45 RPM, thus some bootlegs were ripped at the wrong speed.

The bootleg set 3 Tier Dream disc three titled "Paris Dreams" is a CD version of the bootleg LP Parisian Dreams (1990) plus two tracks from Das Mädchen auf der Treppe. It includes the tracks "Another Perspective (1)" which is actually "Speed", and "Another Perspective (2)", which is actually "Das Mädchen auf der Treppe". Both tracks were recorded at the wrong speed.

The bootleg 70/90 (1990) includes "Das Mädchen auf der Treppe". All four tracks are on Electronic Orgy (1997), and "Speed" was included on the bootleg Traumzeit (1998).

=== Miracle Mile ===
The soundtrack Miracle Mile (1989) includes "After the Call". This track was included on the unlicensed CD Electronic Collection (2001).

=== Pauline et L'Ordinateur ===
One track from Pauline et L'Ordinateur was released on the bootleg Prayer of Quiet Dreams (1993).

=== The Park Is Mine ===
Tangerine Dream composed the score for The Park Is Mine (1986) with a CD release The Park Is Mine (1991). The bootleg 70/90 (1990) includes an excerpt from the track "Love Theme" titled "The Park Is Mine: End Theme".

=== Rainbow Drive ===
The TV movie Rainbow Drive (1990) was scored by Tangerine Dream, but never released as a soundtrack. One track was released on the bootleg Prayer of Quiet Dreams (1993).

=== Red Heat ===
The horror film Red Heat (1985) featured a Tangerine Dream score that has never been fully released. The compilation album The Hollywood Years Vol. 2 includes the main theme as "Riding the Lizard Overland". The track had already been released on the bootleg Prayer of Quiet Dreams (1993) as "Red Heat".

=== Red Nights ===
Red Nights (1988) is another Tangerine Dream scored film without a soundtrack release. The bootleg 70/90 (1990) includes "Red Night: End Theme Parts One & Two".

=== Risky Business ===
Tangerine Dream scored the incidental music for Risky Business (1983) and five Tangerine Dream tracks were released on Risky Business (1984). Risky Business— The Audio Movie Kit (1983) was issued to promote the movie before its release. The two LP set was packaged with a printed booklet and includes interviews and music clips that differ from the soundtrack album.

The bootleg 70/90 (1990) includes "Risky Business: Untitled". In 1997, the audio movie kit was bootlegged in a CD version and packaged with a reproduction of the original booklet. Five tracks from the audio movie kit appear on Prayer of Quiet Dreams (1993). Electronic Orgy (1997) includes ten tracks sourced from the soundtrack, the audio movie kit and the film.

=== Rumpelstiltskin ===
Rumpelstiltskin (1991) from the PBS series We All Have Tales is a video story of the classic fairy tale narrated by Kathleen Turner with background music by Tangerine Dream. An audio version was released as Rumpelstiltskin (1992), and includes the story followed by the music as instrumental tracks. The main "Rumpelstiltskin Theme" was released on the bootleg Mystery Tracks (1993).

=== Shy People ===
The movie Shy People (1987) was scored by Tangerine Dream with the soundtrack released as Shy People (1988). The end title song "Shy People" was sung by Michael Bishop in the film, but the soundtrack version was sung by Jacquie Virgil. The Bishop version was released on the bootlegs Prayer of Quiet Dreams (1993) and Electronic Orgy (1997). This version was also released on Tangerine Tree 63: Assorted Secrets 3 (2005).

=== The Soldier ===
Tangerine Dream composed the score to The Soldier (1982); the soundtrack was released as part of the box set Pilots of Purple Twilight (The Virgin Recordings 1980-1983) (2020). 70/90 (1990) includes "The Soldier: Opening Theme". "Soldier on the Beach" was released on the fan release Tangerine Tree Volume 50: Assorted Secrets 2 (2004).

=== Spasms ===
Tangerine Dream composed the end theme only for the horror film Spasms (1983), another unreleased soundtrack. The bootleg 70/90 (1990) includes "Death Bite / Spasms: Serpents Theme".

=== Streethawk ===
In 1984, Tangerine Dream composed the score for the short-lived TV series Street Hawk. The LP Streethawk (1985) includes two versions of the title track. "Streethawk (Radio Remix)" is included on the bootleg Electronic Orgy (1997).

=== Strange Behavior ===
Strange Behavior (1981) is a Tangerine Dream scored horror film, released as Dead Kids in the US. Another unreleased soundtrack, tracks have appeared on the bootlegs Prayer of Quiet Dreams (1993).

=== Thief ===
The bootlegged CD Thief (2004) is a compilation of tracks from the original soundtrack Thief (1981) and remixes of the soundtrack music from other Tangerine Dream albums.

A single titled Dr. Destructo/Diamond Diary (1981) accompanied the release of Thief that includes an extended version of "Dr. Destructo". This track was included on the bootlegs Mystery Tracks (1993) and Electronic Orgy (1997) as well as the unlicensed version of Thief (2004).

=== Three Phase ===
Three Phase (1993) is a music video that uses music from the 1992 North American tour, which was released on the album 220 Volt Live (1993). The video track listing differs from the album. The video versions of "Graffiti Street", "Phaedra" and "Oriental Haze" appear on the bootleg Electronic Orgy (1997).

=== V ===
The Virgin LP sampler V (1975) includes the "Overture" to the play Oedipus Tyrannus (1974) scored by Tangerine Dream; this track has never been released on other media. It has been released on Keen Auricle's Rare Trax 1 (1991) and the bootleg Electronic Orgy (1997).

== Albums ==
=== '70-'80 ===
Virgin released the four album LP set '70-'80 (1980) which includes three solo tracks by Froese, Franke and Baumann and a remix of "Monolight" titled "Monolight (Single Version)"— these tracks have never been officially released on other media. The bootlegs 70/90 (1990), Electronic Orgy (1997) and Sol Et Luna (1994) include the solo tracks "Haunted Heights", "Chimes and Chains" and "Baryll Blue". Electronic Orgy (1997) includes "Monolight (Single Version)".

=== 220 Volt Live ===
The 1992 North American Tour resulted in 220 Volt Live (1993). The bootleg Prayer of Quiet Dreams (1993) includes excerpts of "Backstreet Hero" and "Hamlet".

=== Ça Va — Ça Marche — Ça Ira Encore ===
The Dream Dice (1998) set include the CD Ça Va — Ça Marche — Ça Ira Encore (1998) which includes the tracks "Ça Va — Ça Marche — Ça Ira Encore", "Tutankhama" and "Craving For Cardomon". All three tracks were released on the bootleg Traumzeit (1998) "Ça Va — Ça Marche — Ça Ira Encore" and "Tutankhama" were later released on Tang-go (2000), while "Tutankhama" was officially released only in remixed versions.

=== Dolphin Dance ===
A 12" single titled Dolphin Dance (1986) accompanied the release of Underwater Sunlight (1986). The single track "Dolphin Smile" has never been officially released on CD or other media, but has appeared on the bootlegs Parisian Dreams Too (1990), 70/90 (1990), Electronic Orgy (1997) and Traumzeit (1998).

=== The Dream Mixes ===
The Dream Mixes (1995) includes "Catwalk (Dress-up Mix)". This track was released on the bootleg Traumzeit (1998).

=== Dreamtime ===
The CD-5 Dreamtime accompanied the release of 220 Volt Live. The vocal version of "Dreamtime" appears on the Keen Auricle fan release Rare Trax 2 (1995). Electronic Orgy (1997) includes "Purple Haze" and "Dreamtime".

=== Electronische Muziek 1989 ===
Electronische Muziek 1989 is a KLEM sampler CD that includes "Lost Tale", a track that has never been released elsewhere. The track was included on the bootlegs Electronic Orgy (1997) and Traumzeit (1998).

=== Exit ===
The unlicensed CD Golden Collection 2000 (2000) includes "Choronzon" and "Exit" from the album Exit (1981).

=== Force Majeure ===
The unauthorized CD Golden Collection 2000 (2000) includes "Cloudburst Flight" from Force Majeure (1979).

=== Goblins' Club ===
The unlicensed CD Golden Collection 2000 (2000) includes "United Goblins' Parade" from Goblins' Club (1996). This track is also included on the unauthorized version of Legend (2005).

=== Jubileumcassette ===
The sampler cassette Jubileumcassette (1986) includes the studio version of "Horns of Doom" which has never been released on other media. The track was released on the Keen Auricle fan CD Rare Trax 1 (1991) and on the bootlegs Electronic Orgy (1997) and Traumzeit (1998).

=== Lily on the Beach ===
The Keen Auricle fan release Rare Trax 2 (1995) includes five remixes from Lily on the Beach (1989). The bootlegged CD Golden Collection 2000 (2000) includes "Mount Shasta", while "Long Island Sunset" was included on the bootlegged CD Electronic Collection (2001).

=== Limited World Tour Edition 1997 ===
During concert tours in 1997, the limited release album Limited World Tour Edition 1997 (1997) was sold. It consisted of three tracks— "Maedchen on the Stairs (Rien ne va plus— Sunset Radio Mix)", "Maedchen on the Stairs (Rien ne va plus— Sunrise Club Mix)" and "Order of the Ginger Gild". All three tracks were released on the bootleg Traumzeit (1998). "Order of the Ginger Gild" was released on the compilation album Dream Encores (1998), but the other two tracks have had no other official release.

=== Mars Polaris ===
The unlicensed CD Golden Collection 2000 (2000) includes four tracks from Mars Polaris (1999).

=== Melrose ===
Melrose (1990) includes the track "Rolling Down Cahuenga". The track was included on the bootleg Traumzeit (1998). The title track was included on the unauthorized CDs Golden Collection 2000 (2000) and Electronic Collection (2001). "Electric Lion" was included on Electronic Collection (2001).

=== Oasis ===
Re-releases of Oasis (1997) include the bonus track "Chia Maroon". The track was included on the bootlegs Collected Endings and Traumzeit (1998). The unlicensed CD Golden Collection 2000 (2000) includes "Summer Storm".

=== Optical Race ===
Optical Race (1988) includes the track "The Midnight Trail". This track was included on the bootleg Traumzeit (1998). "Sun Gate" is included on the unlicensed CDs Golden Collection 2000 (2000) and Electronic Collection (2001).

=== Ossiach Live ===
"Oszillator Planet Concert" was played in Ossiach, Austria on 6 June 1971 and released on the LP sampler Ossiach Live (1971); it has never been officially released on CD or other media. It is included on the Keen Auricle fan release Rare Trax 1 (1991) and the bootlegs Sol Et Luna (1994) and Electronic Orgy (1997). It was released as Tangerine Tree 59: Essen 1968.

=== Le Parc ===
"The Cliffs of Sydney (Sydney)" was originally released on Le Parc (1985). A pre-release version was released as part of the bootleg CD 3 Tier Dream On! (1994) The pre-release version was also released on Tangerine Tree 63: Assorted Secrets 3.

=== The Private Music of Tangerine Dream ===
The compilation album The Private Music of Tangerine Dream (1992) contains two unique tracks—"Beaver Town" and "Roaring of the Bliss". Both tracks were released on Keen Auricle's Rare Trax 2 (1995) and the bootlegs Electronic Orgy (1997), Traumzeit (1998) and Electronic Collection (2001).

=== Quinoa ===
The album Quinoa (1992) was originally a limited release of 1,000 copies for the now defunct official Tangerine Dream International Fan Club with the single title track. Quinoa was re-released in 1998 with two other tracks— "Voxel Ux" and "Lhasa". "Quinoa" was released as part of the bootleg Mystery Tracks (1993). "Voxel Ux" was released on Traumzeit (1998) and "Lhasa" on Electronic Collection (2001).

=== Rockoon ===
The unauthorized CD Golden Collection 2000 (2000) includes two tracks from Rockoon (1992).

=== Rubycon ===
The bootleg CD Rubycon Revisited (1996) is a remixed version of Rubycon (1975). The mix includes trance rhythms, material from Philip Glass and from Black Sabbath.

=== Shepherds Bush ===
Shepherds Bush (1996) is a limited release CD sold at the London 1996 concert and includes two tracks— "Eleanor Rigby" and "Thief Yang and the Tangram Seal". Both tracks were released on the bootleg Traumzeit (1998). The compilation album Dream Encores (1998) also includes the tracks.

=== A Time for Heroes ===
A Time for Heroes (1987) was the theme of the 1987 International Summer Special Olympics World Games. The theme was composed by Jon Lyons; the instrumental versions were performed by Tangerine Dream and the vocal version was performed by Meat Loaf and Brian May. The only official release is on 12" vinyl. The Keen Auricle fan release includes the extended version of "A Time for Heroes" on Rare Trax 1 (1991). The bootleg CD 70/90 (1990) includes a version of "A Time for Heroes", Electronic Orgy (1997) includes the single and extended version and Traumzeit (1998) includes the extended version.

=== Turn of the Tides ===
The release of Turn of the Tides (1994) was accompanied by a promotional CD-5 titled Turn of the Tides that included the bonus track "Story of the Brave". This track was released on the Keen Auricle fan release Rare Trax 2 (1995), the bootlegs Electronic Orgy (1997) and Traumzeit (1998). Releases of Turn of the Tides from 1999 on now include the bonus track. "Galley Slave's Horizon" and "Jungle Journey" are included on the bootlegged CD Electronic Collection (2001).

=== Tyranny of Beauty ===
The release of Tyranny of Beauty (1995) was accompanied by a promotional CD-5 titled Tyranny of Beauty that included the bonus track "Quasar". This track appears on the bootlegs Electronic Orgy (1997) and Traumzeit (1998). The 1999 and 2009 reissues of Tyranny of Beauty included "Quasar".

=== Ultima Thule ===
Ultima Thule (1971) was released on 7" vinyl in 1971 and 1975. The first official CD release was on the anthology The Electronic Magic of Tangerine Dream (2008). A CD remaster of the bootleg LP Leprous Appearance on Wednesday (1984) was released as Dreaming (1994) and included "Ultima Thule, Part One". The two LP bootleg Undercover Dreams (1986) included the Toronto 1986 concert plus one track from Ultima Thule. Keen Auricle released a version as Undercover Dreams' Uncle v.2 (2004) that included the Ultima Thule track and released both tracks on Rare Trax 1 (1991)). The bootleg CD 70/90 (1990) includes "Ultima Thule, Part One" and Electronic Orgy (1997) includes "Ultima Thule, Part One" and "Ultima Thule, Part Two". A counterfeit vinyl version was released in 1998.

=== Warsaw in the Sun ===
Poland (1984) was accompanied by Warsaw in the Sun (1984) as a 12" and 7" vinyl single. The singles include three versions of "Warsaw in the Sun", remixes of "Barbakane". These tracks are included on the bootlegs Electronic Orgy (1997) and Traumzeit (1998).

=== "House of the Rising Sun" ===
"The House of the Rising Sun" was first released by Tangerine Dream as a 7" flexi disc in the Reflex Magazine. This version appears on the Keen' Auricle fan release Rare Trax 1 (1991). "House of the Rising Sun" was later played as an encore at several Tangerine Dream concerts. The live version has been released on the bootlegs Live in the USA 1988 (1992), Collected Endings (1992), Electronic Orgy (1997) and Traumzeit (1998).

== Unidentified ==
Electronic Inspiration: Live 1985 (1986) is a bootleg LP from the 1986 European tour that has not been definitively identified due to poor audio quality.

Live in the USA 1988 (1992) is a 7" vinyl bootleg that includes two tracks from an unidentified concert from the 1988 North American tour.
