= Tangerine Dream filmography =

Tangerine Dream have scored over 50 film, television and video game soundtracks. Just over half of the scores have had official releases, with more released on the Tangerine Tree fan project.

Film	Soundtrack	Notes
Vampira (1971)	Tangerine Tree 71: Adventures in LoFi	German TV film directed by George Moorse.
Geradeaus bis zum Morgen (1972)	Tangerine Tree 36: Assorted Secrets	German TV film directed by Peter Adam.
Ein für allemal (1973)	Tangerine Tree 71: Adventures in LoFi; Tangerine Tree 88: Assorted Secrets 5	German TV film directed by Peter Adam.
Sorcerer (1977)	Sorcerer (1977)	An action-adventure film, produced and directed by William Friedkin, starring Roy Scheider, Bruno Cremer, Francisco Rabal and Amidou. This was Tangerine Dream's first Hollywood film score and led to their popularity as soundtrack composers.
Kneuss (1978)	None	Swiss film
Jahreszeiten der Liebe (1979)	Tangerine Tree 88: Assorted Secrets 5	German TV film directed by George Moorse.
"Das verbotene Spiel" (1979)	None	German TV series with three episodes (directed by George Moorse), scored by TD: Die Ausgestossenen (1979); Das Geheimnis der Kristalle (1979); Der Verfolger (1979)
Daniel (1980)	Tangerine Tree 63: Assorted Secrets III	German TV film directed by George Moorse.
Strange Behavior (1981)	Tangerine Tree 50: Assorted Secrets 2	Horror film, released as Dead Kids in the US.
Thief (1981)	Thief (1981)	A neo-noir crime drama written and directed by Michael Mann. The cast includes James Caan, Tuesday Weld, James Belushi, Robert Prosky and Willie Nelson.
Solomon's Nightmare: A Study in Gray (1982)	None	Short film
Rainer Werner Fassbinder - Letzte Arbeiten (1982)	None	TV documentary directed by Wolf Gremm.
Kamikaze 1989 (1982)	Kamikaze 1989 (Original Soundtrack Music) (1982)	Directed by Wolf Gremm.
Tatort	Das Mädchen auf der Treppe (1982)	TV crime series, episode "Das Mädchen auf der Treppe" (directed by Peter Adam).
The Soldier (1982)	Pilots of Purple Twilight (The Virgin Recordings 1980-1983) (2020) box set Tangerine Tree 50: Assorted Secrets 2	An action film directed by James Glickenhaus and starring Ken Wahl with Klaus Kinski and Alberta Watson.
Brandmale (1983)	Tangerine Tree 80: Assorted Secrets 4	German Film directed by George Moorse.
The Keep (1983)	The Keep (1997); Tangerine Tree 73: Soundtrax; Tangerine Tree 54: The Keep: An Alternate View	Horror film directed by Michael Mann and starring Scott Glenn, Gabriel Byrne, Jürgen Prochnow, Alberta Watson and Ian McKellen. The soundtrack includes sixteen tracks, but only four are actually from the movie.
Risky Business (1983)	Risky Business (1984)	A teen comedy-drama film written by Paul Brickman and starring Tom Cruise and Rebecca De Mornay. The soundtrack includes five tracks of incidental music scored by TD.
Spasms (1983)	Tangerine Tree 88: Assorted Secrets 5	Canadian horror film directed by William Fruet starring Peter Fonda, Oliver Reed and Kerrie Keane.
Wavelength (1983)	Wavelength	Independent science fiction film written and directed by Mike Gray, starring Robert Carradine, Cherie Currie, and Keenan Wynn.
Tatort	Daydream – Moorland (1983)	TV crime series, episode "Miriam" (directed by Peter Adam).
Firestarter (1984)	Firestarter (1984)	Science fiction thriller film based on the novel by Stephen King. Directed by Mark L. Lester and starring Drew Barrymore and David Keith.
Flashpoint (1984)	Flashpoint (1984)	Two Texas Rangers become entangled in the Kennedy assassination conspiracy; starring Kris Kristofferson and Treat Williams.
Forbidden (1984)	None	Television film about a wealthy German countess who hides her Jewish boyfriend in her apartment during World War II; starring Jacqueline Bisset and Jürgen Prochnow.
Heartbreakers (1984)	Heartbreakers (1985)	Drama film starring Peter Coyote and Nick Mancuso; written and directed by Bobby Roth.
Legend (1985)	Legend (1986)	TD scored the soundtrack for the US release
Red Heat (1985)	The Hollywood Years Vol. 2; "Riding the Lizard Overland"	Thriller film starring Linda Blair.
Vision Quest (1985)	Tangerine Tree 73: Soundtrax	Coming of age drama starring Matthew Modine, Linda Fiorentino and Ronny Cox. The official soundtrack release includes none of the TD incidental music.
Street Hawk (1985)	Tangerine Tree 88: Assorted Secrets 5; Le Parc	Short lived US TV series
The Park Is Mine (1986)	The Park Is Mine (1991)	TV film directed by Steven Hilliard Stern, starring Tommy Lee Jones as a Vietnam War veteran who takes control of Central Park to draw attention to veterans' issues.
Zoning (1986)	Zoning (1996); Tangerine Tree 50: Assorted Secrets 2	German film; the 1996 CD release is of a remixed score quite different from the movie soundtrack.
City of Shadows (1987)	Tangerine Tree 50: Assorted Secrets 2	Canadian film about two brothers — one a police officer, the other a murderer.
Deadly Care (1987)	Deadly Care (1992)	TV film starring about a substance abusing nurse, starring Cheryl Ladd.
Near Dark (1987)	Near Dark (1988)	A Western-themed vampire film, written by Eric Red and Kathryn Bigelow, and directed by Bigelow. Starring Adrian Pasdar and Jenny Wright.
Shy People (1987)	Shy People (1988)	Family drama starring Barbara Hershey, Jill Clayburgh and Martha Plimpton.
Three O'Clock High (1987)	Three O'Clock High (1987)	American high-school comedy-drama film, directed by Phil Joanou and starring Casey Siemaszko and Richard Tyson.
Tonight's the Night (1987)	None	TV movie drama directed by Bobby Roth and starring Jack Blessing and Max Gail.
Canyon Dreams (1987)	Canyon Dreams video (1987); Canyon Dreams album (1991)	Music video with scenes of the Grand Canyon
Dead Solid Perfect (1988)	Dead Solid Perfect (1990)	Film following the life of a professional golfer on the PGA Tour. Directed by Bobby Roth and starring Randy Quaid, Kathryn Harrold and Jack Warden.
Destination Berlin (1988)	Destination Berlin (1989)	Imagine 360 film of West Berlin.
Miracle Mile (1988)	Miracle Mile (1989)	Apocalyptic thriller written and directed by Steve De Jarnatt and starring Anthony Edwards and Mare Winningham.
Red Nights (1988)	Tangerine Tree 88: Assorted Secrets 5	Drama about the life of an aspiring Hollywood actor; directed by Izhak Hanooka; starring Chris Parker and Brian Matthews.
Catch Me If You Can (1989)	Catch Me If You Can (1994)	Teen drama about illegal car racing; directed by Stephen Sommers; starring Matt Lattanzi and Loryn Locklin.
The Man Inside (1990)	L'Affaire Wallraff (1992)	Thriller film about unethical journalism, directed by Bobby Roth and starring Jürgen Prochnow, Peter Coyote and Nathalie Baye.
Rainbow Drive (1990)	Tangerine Tree 88: Assorted Secrets 5	Homicide drama directed by Bobby Roth and starring Peter Weller, Sela Ward and David Caruso.
"Rumpelstiltskin" (1991)	Rumpelstiltskin (1992)	TV episode of We All Have Tales retelling the classic fairy tale; narrated by Kathleen Turner and illustrations by Peter Sís.
Tatort	"I Just Want to Rule my Own Life Without You" (1991)	TV crime series, episode "Bis zum Hals im Dreck"
The Switch (1993)	Tangerine Tree 63: Assorted Secrets III; Tangerine Tree 73: Soundtrax	Drama about assisted suicide. Directed by Bobby Roth and starring Gary Cole and Craig T. Nelson.
Three Phase (1993)	Three Phase VHS (1993); Live In America 1992 DVD (2003)	Music video of TD using music from the album 220 Volt Live
America Undercover; "Memphis PD: War on the Streets" (1996)	None	An HBO documentary detailing the pressures on law enforcement officers.
Luminous Visions (1998)	Luminous Visions album (1998)	
Great Wall of China (1999)	Great Wall of China (2000)	
Discovery (2001)	None	
L'inferno (2006)	L'inferno (2006)	1911 silent movie re-released with Tangerine Dream soundtrack.
Grand Theft Auto V (2013)	The Music of Grand Theft Auto V (2013)	An action-adventure video game by Rockstar Games.
