= Love on a Real Train =

1984 single by Tangerine Dream

- Cover of the French release

Promotional single by Tangerine Dream

from the album Risky Business soundtrack
- B-side: "Guido the Killer Pimp"
- Released: 1984
- Genre: Electronic
- Length: 2:18
- Label: Virgin
- Songwriters: Christopher Franke; Edgar Froese; Johannes Schmoelling

Tangerine Dream singles chronology
"Warsaw in the Sun" (1983)	"Love on a Real Train" (1984)	"Flashpoint" (1984)

"Love on a Real Train" is an instrumental composition by German electronic music band Tangerine Dream, released on the soundtrack for the 1983 film Risky Business. It was also released as a promotional single in France in 1984.

== Background ==
When Risky Business director Paul Brickman and producer Jon Avnet arrived in Berlin to hear Tangerine Dream's music for the film's soundtrack, they found that the finished work did not suit their creative vision. Band member Edgar Froese explained:

We sat in front of our instruments, totally unmotivated, turned off the monitors which showed segments of the film, and started improvising some rhythmic patterns and loops without a beginning or end. [Brickman] was suddenly electrified, and claimed that this was exactly the kind of atmosphere the film required. After that, we recorded the complete score in two days and two nights, and ended up bringing the master tapes at 7am to the gate where the director's plane was ready to take off.

== Composition ==
"Love on a Real Train" is in the key of F minor with a tempo of 111 beats per minute. It is a "dreamy, wistfully descending nocturne" instrumental piece featuring "ornately repetitive synth patterns, hypnotic chimes, and percussive choogling drum machines." In appears several times in the film, most prominently during a sex scene between Joel (Tom Cruise) and Lana (Rebecca De Mornay) on a Chicago "L" train.

Critics have noted the influence of American minimalist composer Steve Reich on "Love on a Real Train," with The Cambridge Companion to Krautrock calling the piece a "clear homage" to Music for 18 Musicians. "We stumbled upon a minimal kind of thing, like Steve Reich or Philip Glass," group member Christopher Franke said in 1995. "It was a new way of drawing a romantic theme, which we still get credit for today." Reich considered the homage to be "an out and out ripoff," saying he should have sued for royalties for the whole Risky Business soundtrack.

== Reception and legacy ==
"Love on a Real Train" was named one of the 200 best songs of the 1980s by Pitchfork magazine. Allmusic called it the "standout" cut on the Risky Business soundtrack. The New York Times wrote that in the film, it "helps bring out a strain of melancholy in the misadventures of the all-American teenager played by Tom Cruise" and that it is the band's best-known film piece, and one of their most requested tracks overall.
