= Dream Music – The Movie Music of Tangerine Dream =

Dream Music - The Movie Music of Tangerine Dream

Compilation album by Tangerine Dream
- Released: 1993
- Genre: Electronic music
- Producer: Reynold da Silva

Professional ratings
Review scores
Source	Rating
AllMusic	4.5/5 stars

Dream Music – The Movie Music of Tangerine Dream is a 1993 compilation album by Tangerine Dream featuring material from three of soundtrack albums for the films The Park Is Mine, Deadly Care and Dead Solid Perfect.

== Track listing ==
1. "Victory" – 6:19 (from The Park Is Mine)
2. "The Hospital" – 5:42 (from Deadly Care)
3. "The Letter" – 5:18 (from The Park Is Mine)
4. "Taking Central Park" – 3:20 (from The Park Is Mine)
5. "Suite From Dead Solid Perfect" – 46:12 (from Dead Solid Perfect)
6. "The Helicopter Attack" – 4:40 (from The Park Is Mine)
7. "Clean and Sober" – 4:57 (from Deadly Care)
