= Hyperborea (album) =

Studio album by Tangerine Dream
- Released: 30 August 1983
- Recorded: August 1983
- Genre: Electronic
- Length: 40:15
- Label: Virgin

Tangerine Dream chronology
Wavelength (1983)	Hyperborea (1983)	Risky Business (1984)

Professional ratings
Review scores
Source	Rating
AllMusic	4/5 stars

Hyperborea is the nineteenth major release and thirteenth studio album by Tangerine Dream, released on 30 August 1983 internationally, and on 24 October 1983 in the UK. It spent two weeks on the UK Albums Chart peaking at No.45.

The album title refers to Hyperborea, a mythical, idyllic land in the Ancient Greek tradition, supposedly located far to the north of Thrace and where it was claimed the sun shone twenty-four hours a day.

== Track listing ==
Side one
No.	Title	Length
1.	"No Man's Land"	9:03
2.	"Hyperborea"	8:31
3.	"Cinnamon Road"	3:54

Side two
No.	Title	Length
1.	"Sphinx Lightning"	19:56

Deluxe edition bonus tracks
No.	Title	Length
5.	"The Dream Is Always the Same"	3:43
6.	"No Future (Get Off the Babysitter)"	2:01
7.	"Guido the Killer Pimp"	4:19
8.	"Lana"	3:53
9.	"Love on a Real Train"	3:59

== Personnel ==
- Edgar Froese
- Christopher Franke
- Johannes Schmoelling
