= Johannes Schmoelling =

German musician (born 1950)

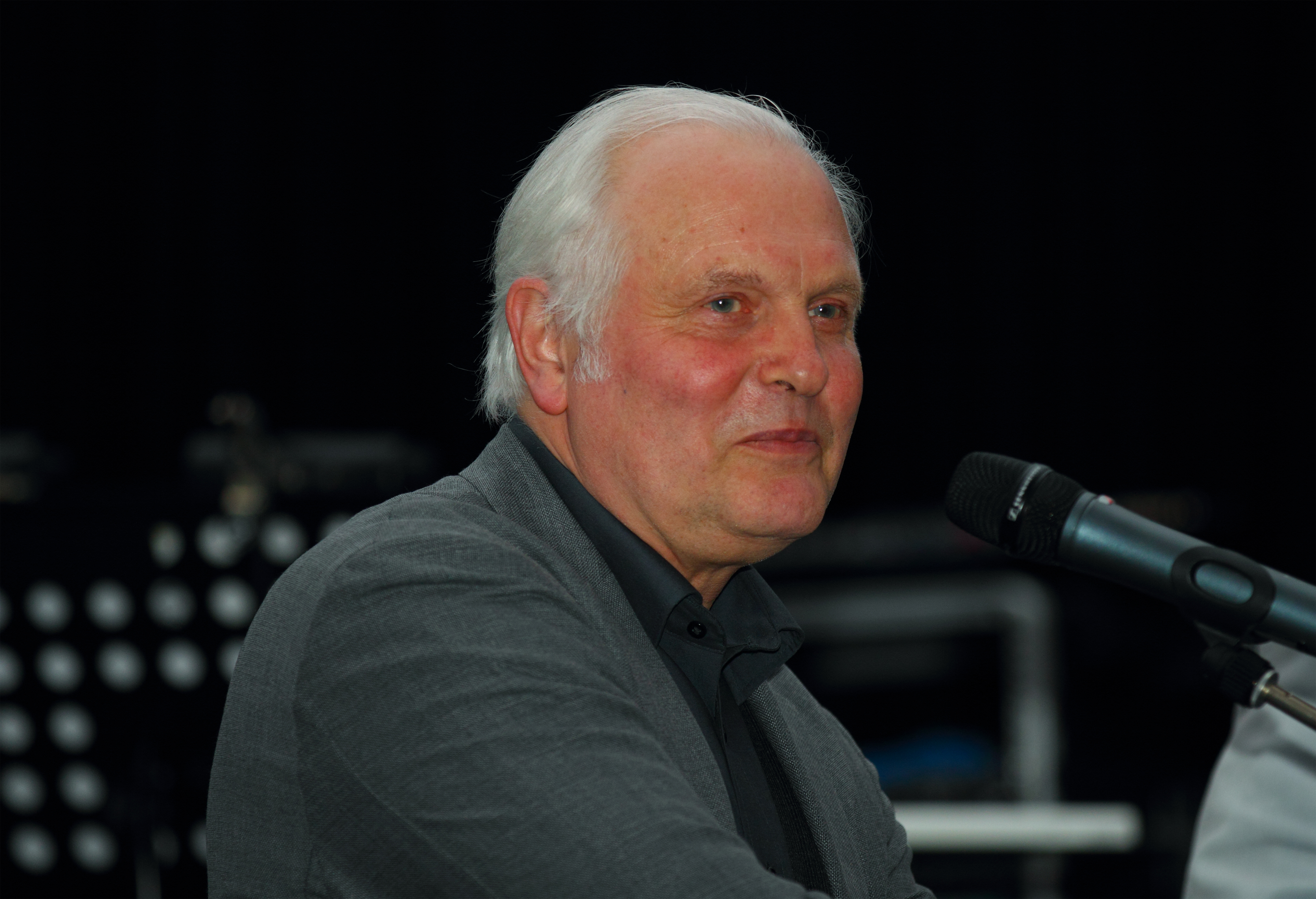

Background information
- Born: 9 November 1950 (age 75); Lohne, West Germany
- Genres: Electronic; ambient; new-age
- Instrument: Keyboards
- Label: Viktoriapark Records
- Website: www.johannesschmoelling.de

Johannes Schmoelling (born 9 November 1950 in Lohne, West Germany) is a German musician and keyboard artist. He was a member of the prolific electronic music group Tangerine Dream from 1979 to 1985.

A classically trained musician, he began playing piano at the age of eight. By twelve he had begun playing the pipe organ and successfully mastered the instrument so well that he began to play professionally at various churches. By 1978 Johannes had graduated from college with a degree in sound engineering and secured a job working on live theater performances at the prestigious Schaubühne am Halleschen Ufer in Berlin. He ended his stint with Tangerine Dream at the end of 1985 to pursue a solo career and has produced several solo albums as well as soundtrack music for numerous German television programs.

== Tangerine Dream ==
Schmoelling met Tangerine Dream founder Edgar Froese in 1979 at the theatre where Schmoelling worked. After his successful audition, he was brought into the band as a replacement for keyboardist and wind player Steve Jolliffe and drummer Klaus Krueger, returning the band to a trio keyboard lineup as in the time of Peter Baumann. Schmoelling's contribution to this period of Tangerine Dream immediately brought a change in musical style. The compositions had shorter constituent parts and more readily discernable pop or rock patterns than before. His first album with Tangerine Dream was Tangram and he performed with the band on many albums like Exit, White Eagle, Logos Live, Hyperborea, and Poland: The Warsaw Concert. He was also a key performer during their prolific soundtrack years in the 1980s and has soundtracks to movies such as Thief, Risky Business, Firestarter and Legend to his credit.

In addition, Schmoelling performed many concerts with the band at various locations throughout the world. On stage, he was more lively, playing the role of performer, unlike the static Froese and Franke. His first live performance with the band was the notable concert on 31 January 1980, in the Palace of the Republic, Berlin, East Germany, recorded and released as the Pergamon album. This was a groundbreaking event since they were the first Western group who was allowed by the GDR government to play in East Berlin.

Schmoelling left Tangerine Dream amicably in October 1985, exhausted by the demanding work schedule.

== Solo career ==
Schmoelling's first solo album was Wuivend Riet, recorded in his own Riet Studios in Berlin and released on the Erdenklang label in 1986. This was followed by the album The Zoo Of Tranquillity in 1988 and the third album White Out in 1990.

His solo career also include numerous compositions for radio and stage plays and television movies. In 2000 he created his own record label Viktoriapark records.

== Loom ==
After working with Jerome Froese on Froese's record "Far side of the face", Johannes Schmoelling joined him and Robert Waters for the Loom project. So far they have released three EPs, titled "100 001", "200 002", and "300 003", and three albums called "The Tree Hates the Forest", "Scored", and "Years in Music".

Loom performed at E-Live in Oirschot, Netherlands on 15 October 2011 and two shows in Budapest in 2012. In 2014, Johannes Schmoelling and Robert Waters performed with Jerome Froese at the Electronic Cirkus Festival, (not as Loom) but supporting Jerome who was a headliner at that festival. Songs by Loom and Tangerine Dream were also played. In 2016, Loom played two more concerts. At Ufa Fabrik in Berlin (where the album Years in Music was recorded), and in October, they played once again at The E-Live Festival in Oirschot, near Eindhoven in The Netherlands.

== S.A.W. ==
With the departure of Jerome Froese, Schmoelling and Waters formed a new lineup with Kurt Ader, a sound programmer for Korg and video artist Andreas Merz. The new band known as S-A-W released their debut CD Iconic in 2020.

== Discography ==
=== Solo ===
- Wuivend Riet (Erdenklang, 1986)
- The Zoo of Tranquility (Theta, 1988)
- White Out (Polydor, 1990)
- Lieder Ohne Worte – Songs No Words (Erdenklang, 1995)
- Der Zaubergeiger Settembrini (Deutsche Grammophon, 1995)
- The Zoo of Tranquility (re-recording, Erdenklang, 1998)
- White Out (re-recording, Viktoriapark, 2000)
- Laufen (Viktoriapark, 2002)
- Recycle or Die (Viktoriapark, 2003)
- Weltmärchen – Weltmusik (Viktoriapark, 2004)
- Instant City (Viktoriapark, 2006)
- Images and Memory (2-CD compilation, Viktoriapark, 2007)
- Early Beginnings (recorded 1979–1985, Viktoriapark, 2008)
- A Thousand Times (Viktoriapark, 2009)
- Time And Tide (Viktoriapark, 2011)
- A Thousand Times Volume 2 (Viktoriapark, 2016)
- Songs No Words 2017 (Viktoriapark, 2017)
- Diary of a Common Thread (Viktoriapark, 2017)
- Iter Meum (Viktoriapark, 2022)

=== with Tangerine Dream ===
- 1980: Tangram
- 1980: Quichotte (Live)
- 1981: Thief (Soundtrack)
- 1981: Exit
- 1982: White Eagle
- 1982: Logos (Live)
- 1982: Tatort (Soundtrack)
- 1983: Hyperborea
- 1983: Wavelength (Soundtrack)
- 1983: Risky Business (Soundtrack)
- 1983: The Keep (Soundtrack)
- 1984: Flashpoint (Soundtrack)
- 1984: Firestarter (Soundtrack)
- 1984: Poland (Live)
- 1985: Le Parc
- 1985: Heartbreakers (Soundtrack)
- 1985: The Park Is Mine (Soundtrack)
- 1986: Legend (Soundtrack)

=== with Loom ===
- 100 001 (EP, Moonpop, 2011)
- Scored (Live, Viktoriapark, 2012)
- 200 002 (EP, Viktoriapark, 2013)
- The Tree Hates The Forest (Viktoriapark, 2014)
- 300 003 (EP, Moonpop, 2016)
- Years In Music (Live, Viktoriapark, 2016)

=== with S-A-W ===
- Iconic (Viktoriapark 2020)
- Hydragate (MIG 2023)

=== Other collaborations ===
- The Immortal Tourist (with Robert Waters, Viktoriapark, 2018)
- Zeit ∞ ? (with Robert Waters, Viktoriapark, 2019)
- 20 (Collaborative tracks with various artists, Viktoriapark, 2020)
- 21 (Collaborative tracks with various artists, Viktoriapark, 2021)
- Fading Memories (with Lambert Ringlage on Lambert's 'Bon Courage' album, Spheric Music, 2023)
