= Wavelength (1983 film) =

1983 film by Mike Gray

- VHS release cover
- Directed by: Mike Gray
- Written by: Mike Gray
- Produced by: James Rosenfield
- Starring: Robert Carradine; Cherie Currie; Keenan Wynn
- Cinematography: Paul Goldsmith
- Edited by: Robert Leighton; Mark Goldblatt
- Music by: Tangerine Dream
- Distributed by: New World Pictures
- Release date: September 16, 1983
- Running time: 87 minutes
- Country: United States
- Language: English
- Budget: $1.5 million

Wavelength is a 1983 science fiction film written and directed by Mike Gray and starring Robert Carradine, Cherie Currie, and Keenan Wynn.

== Plot ==
Bobby Sinclaire (Robert Carradine), a failing Californian musician, meets telepathic Iris Longacre (Cherie Currie) in a bar and they begin a relationship. At Sinclaire's apartment, Longacre begins to hear things others cannot. The young couple discover the voices are from a childlike race of aliens being held by the U.S. government after their UFO crashed. The government plans to use the trio of aliens for experimentation and dissection in a supposedly abandoned underground bunker located near Sinclaire's apartment. The couple decides to liberate the aliens and help them return them to their mothership.

== Cast ==
- Robert Carradine as Bobby Sinclair
- Cherie Currie as Iris Longacre
- Keenan Wynn as Dan
- Cal Bownman as Gen. Milton Ward
- James Hess as Col. James MacGruder
- Terry Burns as Capt. Hinsdale
- Eric Morris as Dr. Vernon Cottrell
- Bob Mclean as Dr. Benjamin Stern
- George Petrie as Dr. Savianno
- Robert Glaudini as Dr. Wolf

== Production ==
Mike Gray wrote Wavelength in 1977 after his deal with Columbia Pictures to direct The China Syndrome fell through. Gray began developing the film at Warner Bros., but following the success of Close Encounters of the Third Kind Gray's script was dropped as it was deemed too similar. The film was kept going thanks to producer Maurice Rosenfield who secured $1.5 million to film Wavelength independently. The film was shot over the course of six weeks with a non union crew in Hollywood, San Pedro, and Death Valley, California.

It was planned for the movie to be released before E.T. the Extra-Terrestrial, but implementation of the film's special effects delayed its release. The 1984 film Starman was accused of plagiarism by reusing the spaceship scenes in the final scenes of both movies.

== Soundtrack ==
Wavelength

Soundtrack album by Tangerine Dream
- Released: September 1983
- Recorded: 1983
- Genre: Electronic
- Length: 37:55
- Label: Varèse Sarabande

Tangerine Dream chronology
Daydream – Moorland (1983)	Wavelength (1983)	Hyperborea (1983)

Wavelength (1983) is the twentieth major release and third soundtrack album by the German band Tangerine Dream. It is the soundtrack for the film Wavelength starring Robert Carradine, Cherie Currie, and Keenan Wynn.

No.	Title	Length
1.	"Alien Voices"	0:16
2.	"Wavelength Main Title"	1:54
3.	"Desert Drive"	2:00
4.	"Mojave End Title"	3:59
5.	"Healing"	2:23
6.	"Breakout"	1:09
7.	"Alien Goodbyes"	1:50
8.	"Spaceship"	2:18
9.	"Church Theme"	3:41
10.	"Sunset Drive"	3:23
11.	"Airshaft"	3:10
12.	"Alley Walk"	2:55
13.	"Cyro Lab"	2:13
14.	"Running Through The Hills"	1:30
15.	"Campfire Theme"	1:23
16.	"Mojave End Title Reprise"	3:51

Many of the tracks are remixes from other albums:

- "Desert Drive" and "Spaceship" are remixed excerpts from "Quichotte, Part One" from Quichotte.
- "Healing is a remixed excerpt of "Tangram Set One" from Tangram
- "Breakout" is a remixed version of "Vitamin C" from the Edgar Froese soundtrack to the film Kamikaze 1989.
- "Church Theme" is a remix of "Silver Scale"; a song that was performed live during European tours in 1980 and 1981, but not released by that name until 1994 on Tangents.
- "Sunset Drive" is a remix of "Remote Viewing" from Exit.
- "Alley Walk" contains elements related to the 1983 single "Moorland" taken from the German TV series Tatort.
- "Alien Voices" and "Wavelength Main Title" were used in the intro of the 1988 Colombian series called "El Visitante"

== Reception ==
TV Guide gave the movie two out of five stars, praising the movie's sense of morality and soundtrack, but found Carradine's performance lacking during the music scenes and the narration at the beginning and ending of the film to be very detrimental to the movie. Moria found that the movie has a promising build up, but that the film heads in predictable directions, and that its special effects were lacking. Creature Feature found that the movie was an interesting morality tale, and also praised the soundtrack, but said that the use of children to play the aliens hampered the film.

== See also ==
- List of films featuring extraterrestrials
