= A Time for Heroes =

Single by Meat Loaf and Tangerine Dream
- B-side: "A Time for Heroes" (instrumental)
- Released: July 1987
- Recorded: 1987
- Genre: Rock
- Length: 4:13
- Label: Orpheum
- Songwriters: Jon Lyons; Meat Loaf and Brian May

"A Time for Heroes" is a song that served as the theme of the 1987 International Summer Special Olympics World Games. The theme was composed by Jon Lyons; the instrumental versions were performed by Tangerine Dream and the vocal version was performed by Meat Loaf and Brian May.

== Track listing ==
No.	Title	Music	Length
1.	"A Time for Heroes" (the song)	Meat Loaf and Brian May	4:13
2.	"A Time for Heroes" (single version)		4:15
3.	"A Time for Heroes" (extended version)		6:04

== Personnel ==
- Jon Lyons – composer
- Christopher Franke
- Edgar Froese
- Paul Haslinger
- John Van Tongeren

=== Vocal version credits ===
- Written by M. Scott Sotebeer, Jon Lyons and Rik Emmett
- Produced and arranged by Jon Lyons
- Executive producer: M. Scott Sotebeer
- Associate producer: John Van Tongeren
- Mixed by Jay Rifkin and Jon Lyons at the Hit Factory, New York City
- Recorded at the Hit Factory, Record Plant, West Lake Audio, and Sine Wave Studios
- Meat Loaf – lead vocals
- Brian May – lead guitar solo
- Bob Kulick – rhythm guitar
- Jon Lyons – bass, acoustic guitar, additional keyboards and synthesizers
- John Van Tongeren – piano, synthesizers
- Bill Boydstun – additional synthesizer programming
- Chuck Bürgi – drums
- Gina Ricci, Amy Goff, Elaine Goff – backing vocals
