= Underwater Sunlight =

- 1986 LP album cover

Studio album by Tangerine Dream
- Released: 30 June 1986
- Recorded: April 1986
- Studio: Berlin
- Genres: Electronic; new age
- Length: 40:13
- Labels: Jive Electro; Relativity
- Producers: Chris Franke; Edgar Froese; Paul Haslinger

Tangerine Dream chronology
Pergamon (1986)	Underwater Sunlight (1986)	Tyger (1987)

Professional ratings
Review scores
Source	Rating
AllMusic	3/5 stars

Underwater Sunlight is the twenty-ninth major release and sixteenth studio album by electronic artists Tangerine Dream.

This album marked the first appearance of Paul Haslinger.

"Underwater Sunlight" spent one week on the UK Albums Chart at No.97.

== Track listing ==
No.	Title	Length
1.	"Song of the Whale, Part One: From Dawn..."	8:25
2.	"Song of the Whale, Part Two: ...To Dusk"	10:53
3.	"Dolphin Dance"	5:05
4.	"Ride on the Ray"	5:30
5.	"Scuba Scuba"	4:30
6.	"Underwater Twilight"	5:50

== Singles ==
Dolphin Dance

No.	Title	Length
1.	"Ride On The Ray" (Excerpt, wrongly titled Dolphin Dance)	3:55
2.	"Dolphin Smile" (Released on Underwater Sunlight (2011))	4:55
3.	"Song of the Whale"	8:12

== Personnel ==
- Edgar Froese — Synthesizer, guitar
- Christopher Franke — Synthesizer, electronic percussion
- Paul Haslinger — Synthesizer, grand piano, guitar
- Christian Gstettner — Computer programming
- Monica Froese — Cover photography
