= Poland (album) =

- 1984 LP album cover

Live album by Tangerine Dream
- Released: 29 October 1984
- Recorded: 10 December 1983
- Venues: Torwar Hall, Warsaw
- Genres: Electronic; kosmische
- Length: 81:49
- Label: Jive Electro
- Producers: Froese, Franke, Schmoelling

Tangerine Dream chronology
Flashpoint (1984)	Poland (1984)	Heartbreakers (1985)

Singles from Poland
- 1. "Warsaw in the Sun" Released: 17 September 1984 8 October 1984 (shaped picture disc)

Professional ratings
Review scores
Source	Rating
AllMusic	4/5 stars

Poland – The Warsaw Concert is the twenty-fourth major release and fifth live album by Tangerine Dream, released in 1984 on Jive Electro, their first release on the label. It spent one week on the UK Albums Chart at number 90.

== Track listing ==
All tracks are written by Edgar Froese, Chris Franke, Johannes Schmoelling.

No.	Title	Length
1.	"Poland"	22:36
2.	"Tangent"	19:55
3.	"Barbakane"	18:04
4.	"Horizon"	21:10

The four tracks consist of 3–4 distinct sections each. The third and fourth sections of "Tangent" were titled "Polish Dance" and "Rare Bird" when both appeared on the B-side of the 12" single release of "Warsaw in the Sun", which is the second section of "Barbakane" in remixed form.

"Barbakane" was shortened to 13:52 on most CD reissues, in order to fit the 80-minute time restraint of the CD, and to avoid having to issue a double-disc version.

Out of twelve CD releases, only three issues have the complete album:

- (1984) Jive/Teldec 8.28638
- (1984) Relativity 88561-8045-2, re-released in 1993
- (2011) Reactive EREACD 2018

All other issues have the truncated version of "Barbakane". Some releases remove "Tangent" altogether.

It was also available as a limited edition picture disc that feature the cover photos directly on the vinyl.

== Personnel ==
- Edgar Froese
- Christopher Franke
- Johannes Schmoelling

== Equipment ==
The following equipment were used on this live recording:

Chris Franke

- Sequential Circuits Prophet-5
- Sequential Circuits Prophet 600
- Sequential Circuits Pro-1
- E-mu Emulator
- E-mu Custom Programmable Synth
- Moog Custom Programmable Modular Synth
- MTI Synergy
- PE Polyrhythmic Sequencer
- Compulab Digital Sequencer
- Syntec Custom Digital Drum Computer
- Simmons Drum Modules
- Quantec Room Simulator
- Roland SDE 3000
- Hill Multi-Mixer

Edgar Froese

- Yamaha DX7
- Yamaha YP-30
- Roland Jupiter-8
- Roland Jupiter-6
- Sequential Circuits Prophet-5
- PPG Wave 2.2
- PE Polyrhythmic Sequencer
- Publison DHM 89 B2
- Publison KB 2000
- Korg SDD 3000 Delay
- Roland SDE MIDI/DCB Interfaces
- Quantec Room Simulator
- Canproduct Mixer

Johannes Schmoelling

- Roland Jupiter-8
- PPG Wave 2.3 Waveterm
- EEH CM 4 Digital Sequencer
- Dr. Böhm Digital Drums
- Roland TR-808
- Mini Moog
- Korg Mono/Poly
- Roland SDE 3000 Delay
- Canproduct Mixer
- MXR 01 Digital Reverb
- MXR Digital Delay
- BOSS Overdrive/Flanger

== Singles ==
- "Warsaw in the Sun" b/w "Polish Dance" (UK No. 96)
