= White Eagle (album) =

Studio album by Tangerine Dream
- Released: 2 April 1982
- Recorded: January 1982
- Genre: Electronic
- Length: 38:00
- Label: Virgin

Tangerine Dream chronology
| Exit (1981) | White Eagle (1982) | Das Mädchen auf der Treppe (1982) |

Professional ratings
Review scores
| Source | Rating |
|---|---|
| AllMusic | 2.5/5 stars |

White Eagle is the seventeenth major release and twelfth studio album by Tangerine Dream. It reached no. 57 in the UK album chart in a 5-week run.

The title track was remixed and went on to become the theme music for the German TV series Tatort with the title "Das Mädchen auf der Treppe".

== Track listing ==
Side one
| No. | Title | Writer(s) | Length |
|---|---|---|---|
| 1. | "Mojave Plan" | Johannes Schmoelling, Chris Franke, Edgar Froese | 20:06 |

Side two
| No. | Title | Writer(s) | Length |
|---|---|---|---|
| 1. | "Midnight in Tula" | Franke, Froese, Schmoelling | 3:52 |
| 2. | "Convention of the 24" | Franke, Froese, Schmoelling | 9:24 |
| 3. | "White Eagle" | Schmoelling, Franke, Froese | 4:30 |

== Personnel ==
- Edgar Froese
- Christopher Franke
- Johannes Schmoelling
