= Risky Business (soundtrack) =

Soundtrack album by various artists and Tangerine Dream
- Released: 1984
- Recorded: 1983
- Genre: Soundtrack
- Length: 42:37 (LP); 45:42 (CD)
- Label: Virgin
- Producers: Various artists; Tangerine Dream

Tangerine Dream chronology
Hyperborea (1983)	Risky Business (1984)	Firestarter (1984)

Singles from Risky Business
- 1. "Love on a Real Train" Released: 1984

Professional ratings
Review scores
Source	Rating
AllMusic	4/5 stars

Risky Business is the twenty-first major release and fourth soundtrack album by Tangerine Dream. It is the soundtrack to the 1983 film Risky Business, starring Tom Cruise, and also includes songs by Bob Seger, Muddy Waters, Jeff Beck, Prince, Journey and Phil Collins. The Tangerine Dream selections consisted of two new compositions and three reworkings of previously released material (from 1979 and 1981), retitled to correspond to scenes in the movie. Steve Reich later commented that it "was an out-an-out ripoff of Music for 18 musicians. I should have sued".

Although the film included "Every Breath You Take" by the Police, "Hungry Heart" by Bruce Springsteen, and "Swamp" by Talking Heads (which includes the lyric "risky business"), these were not released with the soundtrack.

AllMusic noted that the soundtrack is a mix of electronic music from Tangerine Dream, plus rock, blues and funk songs from other music artists. Paul Stump described the album as "hot commercial potential" while noting that the Tangerine Dream contribution is 'dignified and aloof from the MOR horrors elsewhere on the album". Maryann Janosik noted that the soundtrack "integrates music that underscores the plot, theme, and action".

== Track listing ==
All tracks are written by Tangerine Dream, except where noted.

Side one
No.	Title	Writer(s)	Artist(s)	Length
1.	"Old Time Rock and Roll"	Thomas E. Jones III; George Jackson; Bob Seger	Bob Seger and The Silver Bullet Band	3:16
2.	"The Dream Is Always the Same"			2:20 (Note: 3:42 on CD version)
3.	"No Future (Get off the Babysitter) (Note: edited and remixed version of "Exit" from the album of the same name)"			2:00
4.	"Guido the Killer Pimp (Note: edited and remixed excerpt from "Cloudburst Flight" from the album Force Majeure, also incorporating new material)"			4:18
5.	"Lana (Note: edited and remixed excerpt from "Force Majeure" from the album of the same name, also incorporating new material)"			3:51
6.	"Mannish Boy (I'm a Man)"	McKinley Morganfield; Mel London; Ellas McDaniel	Muddy Waters	4:02

Side two
No.	Title	Writer(s)	Artist(s)	Length
7.	"The Pump"	Tony Hymas; Simon Phillips	Jeff Beck	5:47
8.	"D.M.S.R."	Prince	Prince	5:05
9.	"After the Fall"	Steve Perry; Jonathan Cain	Journey	4:20
10.	"In the Air Tonight"	Phil Collins	Phil Collins	5:26
11.	"Love on a Real Train (Risky Business)"			2:15 (Note: 3:58 on CD version)

== Personnel ==
- Edgar Froese – keyboards, electronic equipment, guitar
- Christopher Franke – synthesizers, electronic equipment, electronic percussion
- Johannes Schmoelling – keyboards, electronic equipment

== Audio Movie Kit ==
Risky Business - The Audio Movie Kit was released to radio stations to promote the film. The kit was two LPs with trailers, interviews and eight music clips.
