= Quichotte (album) =

1981 live album by Tangerine Dream

Live album by Tangerine Dream
- Released: January 1981
- Recorded: 31 January 1980; Palast der Republik, East Berlin
- Genre: Electronic
- Length: 46:03
- Label: Amiga

Tangerine Dream chronology
Tangram (1980)	Quichotte (1981)	Thief (1981)

Pergamon

Live album by Tangerine Dream
- Released: July 1986
- Recorded: 31 January 1980; Palast der Republik, East Berlin
- Genres: Electronic; kosmische
- Length: 46:03
- Label: Virgin / Caroline
- Producers: Franke, Froese, Schmoelling

Tangerine Dream chronology
Legend (1986)	Pergamon (1986)	Underwater Sunlight (1986)

Quichotte is the fourteenth major release and third live album by Tangerine Dream released in 1981. It was re-released in 1986 as Pergamon. It is a selection from the two live concerts held on 31 January 1980 at the Palast der Republik in East Berlin. The second of the two original concerts is available as Tangerine Tree Volume 17: East Berlin 1980. The original title Quichotte is a reference to Don Quixote, a film version of which was being screened in a nearby cinema as one of the concerts was performed, while the retitle is a reference to the Pergamon Museum located in East Berlin near the Palast der Republik.

== Track listing ==
No.	Title	Length
1.	"Quichotte Part I"	22:38
2.	"Quichotte Part II"	23:33

Remixed excerpts from "Quichotte Part I" were used in the soundtrack for Wavelength. The piano solo from Part One has been released on other albums as "Pergamon (Piano Part)" and re-recorded as "Pergamon Sphere".

Some elements from the performances in "Quichotte Part I" were incorporated into their Tangram studio album, even though Quichotte itself was not released on record until the following year.

== Personnel ==
- Edgar Froese – synthesizers, electric guitar
- Christopher Franke – synthesizers, electronic percussion
- Johannes Schmoelling – synthesizers, piano
