= Mars Polaris =

Studio album by Tangerine Dream
- Released: 1999
- Recorded: 1999
- Studios: Eastgate Studios (Vienna) and Mariner Studios (California)
- Genre: Electronic
- Label: TDI
- Producer: Edgar Froese

Tangerine Dream chronology
What a Blast (1999)	Mars Polaris (1999)	Great Wall of China (1999)

Main studio albums chronology
Goblins' Club (1996)	Mars Polaris (1999)	Jeanne d'Arc (2005)

Professional ratings
Review scores
Source	Rating
AllMusic	4/5 stars
Sputnikmusic	2.5/5

Mars Polaris – Deep Space Highway to Red Rocks Pavilion is the 67th release and 25th major studio album by the electronic group Tangerine Dream. It was originally released in 1999, and re-released in 2009. All the tracks appeared on their live album Rocking Mars, which was released in 2005 with four extra tracks. It was recorded at Stadthalle in Osnabrück.

== Background ==
According to Voices in the Net, in June 1999, Tangerine Dream performed a one-off concert during the Klangart Festival in Osnabrück, presenting their new album Mars Polaris – Deep Space Highway to Red Rocks Pavilion. The whole album was performed, though the track order was changed. The music performed is essentially identical to the studio versions, with some guitar and percussion work added. Some older tracks were included in the main set and the encores (which did not appear on Mars Polaris).

There is a version of the album that includes tracks from Great Wall of China. It is limited to only a few hundred copies. The master disc that included these tracks was mistaken for the Mars Polaris master, and was pressed shortly before Great Wall of China was released. The composite master was purposefully made, and was originally intended to be released to promote both albums.

Edgar Froese and Jerome Froese recorded their compositions independently of each other due to time constraints.

== Track listing ==
No.	Title	Writer(s)	Length
1.	"Comet's Figure Head"	Jerome Froese	10:02
2.	"Rim of Schiaparelli"	Edgar Froese	6:15
3.	"Pilots of the Ether Belt"	Jerome Froese	10:15
4.	"Deep Space Cruiser"	Edgar Froese	4:42
5.	"Outland (The Colony)"	Jerome Froese	9:15
6.	"Spiral Star Date (Level ♇)" (♇ is the astronomical symbol for Pluto)	Edgar Froese	6:13
7.	"Mars Mission Counter"	Edgar Froese	5:45
8.	"Astrophobia"	Jerome Froese	9:57
9.	"Tharsis Maneuver"	Edgar Froese	4:31
10.	"Dies Martis (TransMercury)"	Edgar Froese	4:00

== Personnel ==
- Edgar Froese — composer, musician
- Jerome Froese — composer, musician
