= Tangram (album) =

Studio album by Tangerine Dream
- Released: 30 May 1980
- Recorded: 1980
- Studios: Polygon Studios, Berlin
- Genres: Electronic; kosmische; new age
- Length: 40:15
- Label: Virgin
- Producers: Chris Franke; Edgar Froese

Tangerine Dream chronology
Force Majeure (1979)	Tangram (1980)	Quichotte (Pergamon) (1981)

Professional ratings
Review scores
Source	Rating
AllMusic	4/5 stars

Tangram is the thirteenth major release and tenth studio album by the electronic music group Tangerine Dream. It became their fifth biggest selling album, reaching number 36 on the British Top 40, and spending 5 weeks on the chart.

== Overview ==
At a turning point between two eras, Tangram contains fond glimpses back at the "classic long-form sequencer" period and also contains foreshadows of the "melodic short track" period to come. It introduced new member Johannes Schmoelling, re-establishing the band as a keyboard trio.

Each set contains multiple movements, some rhythmic, some atmospheric. An early live set in East Berlin (recorded in January 1980 and documented in Tangerine Dream's Quichotte, later retitled Pergamon) contains passages similar to Tangram.

== Track listing ==
Side one
No.	Title	Length
1.	"Tangram Set 1"	19:47

Side two
No.	Title	Length
1.	"Tangram Set 2"	20:28

== Personnel ==
- Edgar Froese – keyboards, guitars
- Christopher Franke – keyboards, electronic percussion
- Johannes Schmoelling – keyboards (some CD editions erroneously credit Peter Baumann)
- Eduard Meyer – mixing engineer, Hansa Studios, Berlin – recorded at the Polygon studio, in Spandau, Berlin
- Monica Froese – cover photo (all editions), sleeve design ("Definitive Edition")
