= Great Wall of China (album) =

Soundtrack album by Tangerine Dream
- Released: December 1999
- Genre: Electronic, new-age
- Label: TDI Music TDI CD022

Tangerine Dream chronology
Mars Polaris (1999)	Great Wall of China (1999)	Soundmill Navigator (2000)

Professional ratings
Review scores
Source	Rating
Allmusic	3/5 stars

Great Wall of China is the sixty-eighth release and twenty-sixth soundtrack album by Tangerine Dream.

== Track listing ==
No.	Title	Length
1.	"Meng Tian"	5:15
2.	"Summer in Shauxi"	4:00
3.	"South Gate Knights"	6:01
4.	"Silence the Barking Monk"	7:25
5.	"Zhu Zhanji"	6:16
6.	"Stranded Without Shade"	4:34
7.	"No More Candles Burning"	4:15
8.	"Lights of Beijing"	5:46
9.	"Snow on Dragon's Peak"	4:45
10.	"Cradle of Prodigies"	5:24
11.	"Tiger Forest"	4:23
