= Daydream – Moorland =

Soundtrack album by Tangerine Dream
- Released: May 1983
- Recorded: 1983
- Genre: Electronic
- Length: 8:30
- Label: Virgin

Tangerine Dream chronology
Logos Live (1982)	Daydream – Moorland (1983)	Wavelength (1983)

Daydream – Moorland is a 1983 soundtrack single by the German band Tangerine Dream for the episode Miriam from the TV series Tatort (Crime Scene). It is available only on 7″ vinyl.

== Track listing ==
No.	Title	Length
1.	"Daydream"	4:40
2.	"Moorland"	3:50
