= Destination Berlin =

- 1989 CD cover

Soundtrack album by Tangerine Dream
- Released: 1989
- Recorded: 1989
- Genre: Electronic
- Length: 37:28
- Labels: Hansa; Ariola
- Producers: Edgar Froese; Paul Haslinger

Tangerine Dream chronology
Lily on the Beach (1989)	Destination Berlin (1989)	Melrose (1990)

Professional ratings
Review scores
Source	Rating
AllMusic	3/5 stars

Destination Berlin is the thirty-eighth major release and thirteenth soundtrack album by Tangerine Dream. It is the soundtrack to the 1989 360° movie Destination Berlin. The movie was shown at the premier of the Imagine 360 theater in West Berlin.

== Track listing ==
No.	Title	Length
1.	"Alexander Square (LP version)"	4:50
2.	"Emperors Castle"	2:10
3.	"Hitchhikers Point"	5:00
4.	"Brandenburg Gate"	3:25
5.	"Wall-Street"	3:16
6.	"Peacock Island"	3:25
7.	"Down the Avus"	4:40
8.	"Midnight in Bear City"	4:25
9.	"Berlin Summer Nights"	4:17
10.	"Alexander Square (Reprise)"	2:00
Total length:		37:28

== Personnel ==
- Edgar Froese
- Paul Haslinger
