= Thief (soundtrack) =

- US LP cover

Soundtrack album by Tangerine Dream
- Released: April 1981
- Recorded: February – November 1980
- Venue: Berlin
- Studio: Chris Franke's studio
- Genre: Electronic
- Length: 39:07 or 40:11
- Label: Virgin

Tangerine Dream chronology
Quichotte (1981)	Thief (1981)	Exit (1981)

Professional ratings
Review scores
Source	Rating
AllMusic	2.5/5 stars

Thief (1981) is the fifteenth major release and second soundtrack album by Tangerine Dream. It is the soundtrack for the 1981 American neo-noir crime film Thief, directed by Michael Mann. It reached No. 43 on the UK Albums Chart in a 3-week run.

"Beach Theme" and "Beach Scene" are two different mixes of the same piece. The album version of "Dr. Destructo" is quite different from the film version. An extended version of "Dr. Destructo" was available only on a promo single. "Igneous" is a remix of "Thru Metamorphic Rocks" from the 1979 album Force Majeure. Neither "Beach Theme" nor "Trap Feeling" appear in the film.

After Tangerine Dream completed the soundtrack, Mann needed another sequence. As Tangerine Dream was on tour, Craig Safan composed and performed "Confrontation". The original 1981 Elektra US LP release featured "Confrontation" and omitted "Beach Scene", with international releases doing the opposite.

During the 1980s, Toronto television station CITY-DT used "Scrap Yard" as their background music when inserting technical difficulties slide cards. "Scrap Yard" was also used as the theme for local television newscasts on KFTY (now KEMO-TV) in Santa Rosa, California and WNDU in South Bend, Indiana.

Another track from the album, "Burning Bar", was used by WFLD-TV as the theme song to their late-night teletext service from KeyFax.

The soundtrack was also nominated for Worst Musical Score at the 2nd Golden Raspberry Awards.

== Versions ==
There are currently two versions of the soundtrack available with different track listings and album covers. Version A has the text 'Original Motion Picture Soundtrack' above the title followed by the text 'James Caan' just below. The text 'Composed and Performed by Tangerine Dream', appears at the bottom. Version B just has "Tangerine Dream" above the title.

In 2004, Wounded Bird Records re-released version B with "Confrontation"; there were however two mispressings, one with the version A track list, and one with "Igneous" removed instead of "Beach Scene". All had the listing for version B on the CD and cover.

In 2013, Perseverance Records released a re-mastered, nine track version that included both "Beach Scene" and "Confrontation", thus correcting the errors on previous releases where both tracks were never on the same disc.

== Track listings ==
No.	Title	Length
1.	"Beach Theme"	3:44
2.	"Dr. Destructo"	3:18
3.	"Diamond Diary"	10:48
4.	"Burning Bar"	3:11
5.	"Beach Scene" (Version B only)	6:48
6.	"Scrap Yard"	4:40
7.	"Trap Feeling"	2:57
8.	"Igneous"	4:45
9.	"Confrontation" (Version A only)	5:37

== Personnel ==
- Edgar Froese – guitar, keyboards, electronic equipment
- Christopher Franke – synthesizers, electronic equipment, electronic percussion
- Johannes Schmoelling – keyboards, electronic equipment
- Klaus Krüger – percussion on "Igneous" (recorded 1978)
- Michael Mann – some minor guitar
- Craig Safan – composed "Confrontation". He has said that it was performed by session musicians.
