= Le Parc (album) =

- 1985 LP album cover

Studio album by Tangerine Dream
- Released: 14 May 1985
- Recorded: January–February, 1985, in Berlin, Vienna, and London
- Genre: Electronic
- Length: 39:45
- Label: Jive Electro
- Producers: Christopher Franke; Edgar Froese; Johannes Schmoelling

Tangerine Dream chronology
Heartbreakers (1985)	Le Parc (1985)	Green Desert (1986)

Singles from Le Parc
- 1. "Streethawk" Released: 12 August 1985 (UK)

Professional ratings
Review scores
Source	Rating
AllMusic	2.5/5 stars

Le Parc is the twenty-sixth major release and fourteenth studio album to be recorded by electronic group Tangerine Dream, released on 14 May 1985 internationally, and in the UK on 27 August 1985. Each track on the album is inspired by parks from around the world. Le Parc marked Tangerine Dream's last studio release with Johannes Schmoelling, who left the band in October 1985. The title track "Le Parc" was used as the theme for the short-lived U.S television series, Street Hawk. A video was produced for "Tiergarten". The track "Central Park" was used as the opening theme for the movie Diamond Ninja Force directed by Godfrey Ho.

According to Dave Connolly of AllMusic, Le Parc is in essence a series of "musical postcards" from major parks of the world that focus on the mood of these places rather than their geographical qualities. Its tracks are shorter and more lyrical than the band's earlier works. Connolly said Le Parc "operates on a superficial level", which might be "slightly distasteful" to some long-time fans.

== Track listing ==
No.	Title	Length
1.	"Bois de Boulogne (Paris)"	5:07
2.	"Central Park (New York)"	3:37
3.	"Gaudi Park (Guell Garden Barcelona)"	5:10
4.	"Tiergarten (Berlin)"	3:28
5.	"Zen Garden (Ryoanji Temple Kyoto)"	3:07
6.	"Le Parc (L.A. - Streethawk)"	2:56
7.	"Hyde Park (London)"	3:50
8.	"The Cliffs of Sydney (Sydney)"	5:20
9.	"Yellowstone Park (Rocky Mountains)"	6:10

== Personnel ==
- Christopher Franke
- Edgar Froese
- Johannes Schmoelling
- Clare Torry – vocals on "Yellowstone Park"
- Katja Brauneis – vocals on "Zen Garden"
- Robert Kastler – trumpets on "Bois de Boulogne"
- Christian Gstettner – computer programming
- Steffan Hartmann – computer programming
- Monica Froese – sleeve design
