= Heartbreakers (1984 film) =

1984 film by Bobby Roth

- Directed by: Bobby Roth
- Written by: Bobby Roth
- Produced by: Bobby Roth; Bob Weis
- Starring: Peter Coyote; Nick Mancuso; Carole Laure; Max Gail; Carol Wayne; Kathryn Harrold
- Cinematography: Michael Ballhaus
- Edited by: John Carnochan
- Music by: Tangerine Dream
- Production company: Jethro Films Production
- Distributed by: Orion Pictures
- Release date: September 28, 1984
- Running time: 98 minutes
- Country: United States
- Language: English
- Box office: $148,750

Heartbreakers is a 1984 American drama film starring Peter Coyote and Nick Mancuso. It was written and directed by Bobby Roth. The film was entered into the 35th Berlin International Film Festival.

== Plot ==
Two friends in their mid 30s, Blue (Coyote) and Eli (Mancuso), each arrive at crossroads in their lives. Blue is a painter specializing in fetishistic portraits of women, usually selling his images to porn magazines. Eli's father wants him to take over the family's undergarment business that has been paying for Eli's playboy lifestyle in the fast-paced and decadent Los Angeles of the 1980s.

Blue is given an opportunity to have his work featured in a gallery showing as legitimate art if he can create enough new pieces to fill out a show. His sexy busty model (Carol Wayne) has a crush on Blue, and to please him even appears willing to participate in a threesome including Eli.

An ex-flame, Cyd (Kathryn Harrold), brings out the jealous worst in Blue now that she is seeing an artist rival of his (Max Gail). Blue's self-destructive behavior also puts at risk his relationship with Liliane (Carole Laure), the manager of an art gallery about to exhibit his work.

== Cast ==
- Peter Coyote as Arthur Blue
- Nick Mancuso as Eli
- Carole Laure as Liliane
- Max Gail as King
- James Laurenson as Terry Ray
- Carol Wayne as Candy
- Jamie Rose as Libby
- Kathryn Harrold as Cyd
- George Morfogen as Max
- Jerry Hardin as Warren Williams
- Henry G. Sanders as Reuben (credited as Henry Sanders)
- Walter Olkewicz as Marvin

== Production ==
The character of Blue was loosely based on real-life artist Robert Blue.

== Behind the Scenes ==
This would be Carol Wayne's final film appearance before she died under mysterious circumstances on vacation in Manzanillo, Mexico just months after the film's release.

== Soundtrack ==
Heartbreakers

Soundtrack album by Tangerine Dream
- Released: April 1985
- Recorded: 1985
- Genre: Electronic music
- Length: 38:10
- Label: Virgin
- Producer: Tangerine Dream

Tangerine Dream albums chronology
| Poland (1984) | Heartbreakers (1985) | Le Parc (1985) |

Professional ratings
Review scores
| Source | Rating |
|---|---|
| AllMusic | 3/5 stars |

Heartbreakers (1985) is the twenty-fifth major release and seventh soundtrack album by the German band Tangerine Dream. It was released in April 1985 by Virgin Records.

=== Track listing ===
All music is composed by Tangerine Dream.

| No. | Title | Length |
|---|---|---|
| 1. | "Heartbreakers" | 2:30 |
| 2. | "Footbridge to Heaven" | 3:00 |
| 3. | "Twilight Painter" | 4:12 |
| 4. | "Gemini" | 3:28 |
| 5. | "Rain in N.Y. City" | 3:23 |
| 6. | "Pastime" | 3:00 |
| 7. | "The Loser" | 3:17 |
| 8. | "Breathing the Night Away" | 2:25 |
| 9. | "Desire" | 5:38 |
| 10. | "Thorny Affair" | 3:10 |
| 11. | "Daybreak" | 4:07 |
| Total length: | | 38:10 |

== Personnel ==
- Edgar Froese – keyboards, electronic equipment, guitar
- Christopher Franke – synthesizers, electronic equipment, electronic percussion
- Johannes Schmoelling – keyboards, electronic equipment

== Reception ==
The film received a mixed to positive critical reception. Heartbreakers holds an 80% rating on Rotten Tomatoes based on ten reviews.
