= Flashpoint (1984 film) =

1984 film by Dennis Shryack

- Theatrical release poster
- Directed by: William Tannen
- Written by: Dennis Shryack; Michael Butler
- Based on: Flashpoint by George LaFountaine
- Starring: Kris Kristofferson; Treat Williams; Rip Torn; Tess Harper
- Cinematography: Peter Moss
- Edited by: David Garfield
- Music by: Tangerine Dream
- Production companies: HBO Pictures; Silver Screen Partners
- Distributed by: Tri-Star Pictures
- Release date: August 31, 1984
- Running time: 92 minutes
- Country: United States
- Language: English
- Budget: $10 million
- Box office: $3.8 million

Flashpoint is a 1984 American neo-Western action thriller film starring Kris Kristofferson, Treat Williams, Rip Torn, Jean Smart, Kurtwood Smith, and Tess Harper. The film is directed by William Tannen in his directorial debut, and is based on the novel of the same name by George LaFountaine, with a screenplay by Dennis Shryack and Michael Butler. The original score was composed and performed by Tangerine Dream. It was the first theatrical film produced by HBO Pictures.

== Plot ==
Border Patrol agents Bobby Logan and Ernie Wyatt are planting motion sensors in a remote area of the Texas desert when they stumble across what appears to be a decades-old Jeep buried in the sand. Upon excavating the vehicle, they find an intact skeleton in the driver's seat, a toolbox containing $800,000 in unused 10 and 20 dollar bills, and a hunting case containing a scoped sniper rifle with matching ammunition. The skeleton is accompanied by a wallet, containing the driver's license of a Michael J. Curtis from San Antonio, and a slip of paper with two phone numbers on it. Logan speculates that the money is from a bank heist in the early 1960s, and suggests that he and Wyatt take the money for themselves. While Wyatt is reluctant, they both finally agree to put out the Jeep's license plate information to the Sheriff's department, and ask their telephone operator girlfriends to check out the two phone numbers.

After re-burying the Jeep and its contents, the duo take two of the bills to be analyzed, and learn that they were circulated directly from the Federal Reserve in Dallas and are all dated between 1962 and 1963. On checking newspaper records in the town library, Logan can find nothing relating to any bank robberies in 1962/63. He does however pause to read the headlines of 22 November 1963, the day of John F. Kennedy's assassination.

When the two return to the station, they discover federal agents, led by self-proclaimed "fixer" Carson, have arrived, ostensibly to take control of the planned surveillance operation and possible bust of a drug trafficker in coordinating with the local Sheriff Wells. Logan quickly dislikes and distrusts Carson, who seems to be intimately familiar with Logan's service in the U.S. Army. Logan was a decorated infantry officer who served in the United States Army Special Forces and fought in Vietnam. Later on he left the Army and went on a self-imposed exile from higher government activities. Carson appears to deliberately blow Logan and Wyatt's cover when they are moving in to arrest a drug smuggler, almost killing Wyatt. They learn afterwards that Carson has taken over as head of station after the sudden promotion of their previous supervisor.

A local prospector discovers the Jeep burial site and re-excavates it, summoning the attention of Carson and the US Army who cordon off the area. Logan and Wyatt's girlfriends tell them that the phone numbers are a number in Washington, D.C., and an old, unused number for the Dallas Police Department. They also tell them that the information has been passed onto two fellow Border Patrol agents, Roget and Lambassino. Upon driving to the house of the prospector, they find him murdered and the building burned to the ground. Following the tire tracks leading away from the house, they track down one of their station's Jeeps to a deserted farm, and find the tied up dead bodies of Roget and Lambassino. Carson and his team subsequently arrive on the scene, intimating to a shocked Logan and Wyatt that the incident will be covered up.

Disgusted at Carson's callousness, Logan is ready to leave town for good, but Carson first sends him on a solo mission to Soledad Mountain to investigate a suspicious vehicle, while sending Wyatt to a location where he claims illegal immigrants are being smuggled across the border. Logan realizes the mission is a setup, and Carson is trying to eliminate anyone who knows about the Jeep. He rushes to Wyatt's last known location, but arrives too late, finding him stabbed to death with Logan's hunting knife.

Grieving for his friend and determined to get revenge, Logan heads to the location where he and Wyatt had hidden the money and rifle. As he approaches, he is shot in the shoulder by Carson and his men. Logan manages to elude their line of sight, flanking behind them and killing Carson's men and shooting him in the leg. Carson limps to Logan's Jeep to try to escape, only to discover the keys are not in the ignition. Logan empties his revolver into Carson, killing him.

Examining the rifle in the case, Logan is approached by a gun-pointing Sheriff Wells, who tells him that in finding the Jeep he reawakened a twenty-year old nightmare. He reveals the truth about the Jeep and its contents, that Michael J. Curtis was part of a government conspiracy to assassinate John F. Kennedy, and was himself the true assassin. Wells admits complicity in the conspiracy, providing the assassin with the Jeep, gun, and money. Curtis was meant to take these things and drive south to Mexico, but instead accidentally crashed his Jeep in the desert during a storm, killing himself and leaving his car to the elements (this was shown in the movie's opening sequence). Wells tells Logan to take the money and go to Mexico; he refuses and states his intention to go back to the station and report everything. Wells tells him that he has been framed for the murders of Wyatt, Roget and Lambassino and almost begs him to be "the one who got away". He tells Logan quietly that he'll cover for his escape and alludes to his likely imminent murder by stating "whatever happens should have happened years ago". With some reluctance, Logan boards the Jeep and tells Wells to tell them he will return one day and Wells wryly says "I'll tell them". He drives away towards the border, leaving Wells staring out across the desert.

== Cast ==
- Kris Kristofferson as Bobby Logan
- Treat Williams as Ernie Wyatt
- Rip Torn as Sheriff Wells
- Kurtwood Smith as Carson
- Jean Smart as Doris
- Tess Harper as Ellen
- Kevin Conway as Brook
- Miguel Ferrer as Roget
- Guy Boyd as Bobby Joe Lambasino
- Roberts Blossom as Amarillo
- Mark Slade as Hawthorne
- Terry Alexander as Peterson
- Ana Auther as Roget's Date
- William Frankfather as Lacy
- Joaquín Martínez as Pedroza
- Dick O'Neill as Hinshaw

== Production ==
The rights to George LaFountaine's novel, Flashpoint, were first purchased in 1975 by First Artists with screenwriters Michael Butler and Dennis Shyrack writing the script for stars Paul Newman and Warren Oates with Martin Ritt intended to direct. Following the collapse of First Artists many of the company's assets were liquidated including the Flashpoint rights which were acquired by producer Skip Short and director William Tannen. Flashpoint was the first production of Silver Screen Partners, a joint venture between cable television station Home Box Office and Columbia Pictures.

== Reception ==
Flashpoint received mixed reviews from critics.

On Rotten Tomatoes, the film holds a rating of 54% from 13 reviews.

Roger Ebert 31 August 1984: "such a good thriller for so much of its length that it's kind of a betrayal when the ending falls apart".

== Soundtrack ==
Flashpoint
- 1984 LP album cover

Soundtrack album by Tangerine Dream
- Released: 1984
- Recorded: 1984
- Genre: Electronic
- Length: 37:07
- Label: EMI

Tangerine Dream chronology
Firestarter (1984)	Flashpoint (1984)	Poland (1984)

Professional ratings
Review scores
Source	Rating
AllMusic	2/5 stars
Kerrang!	3/5 stars

Flashpoint is the twenty-third major release and sixth soundtrack album by Tangerine Dream.

A CD version was released in 1984 on the Heavy Metal label but was soon recalled due to pressing errors that rendered the CD unplayable. The soundtrack was not released on CD again until 1995. The entire album was released as part of the bootleg Mystery Tracks (1993).

=== Track listings ===
All tracks are written by Edgar Froese, Chris Franke, Johannes Schmoelling.

No.	Title	Length
1.	"Going West"	4:10
2.	"Afternoon in the Desert"	3:35
3.	"Plane Ride"	3:30
4.	"Mystery Tracks"	3:15
5.	"Lost in the Dunes"	2:40
6.	"Highway Patrol"	4:10
7.	"Love Phantasy"	3:40
8.	"Mad Cap Story"	4:00
9.	"Dirty Cross Roads"	4:20
10.	"Flashpoint" (composed and performed by The Gems)	3:47

=== Personnel ===
- Edgar Froese – keyboards, electronic equipment, guitar
- Christopher Franke – synthesizers, electronic equipment, electronic percussion
- Johannes Schmoelling – keyboards, electronic equipment
- The Gems – only "Flashpoint"
