= Exit (Tangerine Dream album) =

- North American cover

Studio album by Tangerine Dream
- Released: 11 September 1981
- Recorded: June–July 1981
- Venue: Berlin
- Genre: Electronic
- Length: 36:32
- Label: Virgin
- Producers: Edgar Froese, Christopher Franke

Tangerine Dream chronology
Thief (1981)	Exit (1981)	White Eagle (1982)

Singles from Exit
- 1. "Choronzon" Released: 28 August 1981

Professional ratings
Review scores
Source	Rating
AllMusic	3/5 stars

Exit is the sixteenth major release and eleventh studio album by the German group Tangerine Dream. The first track features an uncredited Berlin actress chanting, in Russian, the names of the continents of the world and pleading to end the threat of "limited" nuclear war, which was a potential danger facing the world during the late Cold War era in which the album was released. Exit reached № 43 in the UK, spending five weeks on the chart.

== Use in other media ==
The track "Choronzon" is used as the title theme for the Hungarian political TV show, Panoráma. "Network 23" was used in the early 1980s by the TVA network in Montreal (Canada) to promote their news service. The title track is featured in the sixth episode "The Monster" of the Netflix series Stranger Things.

== Track listing ==
Side one
No.	Title	Length
1.	"Kiew Mission"	9:18
2.	"Pilots of Purple Twilight"	4:19
3.	"Choronzon"	4:07

Side two
No.	Title	Length
1.	"Exit"	5:33
2.	"Network 23"	4:55
3.	"Remote Viewing"	8:20

== Personnel ==
- Edgar Froese – composer, musician, producer
- Christopher Franke – composer, musician, producer
- Johannes Schmoelling – composer, musician
- Monica Froese – album cover

== Singles ==
- "Choronzon / Network 23"
