= The Park Is Mine (1985 film) =

1985 Canadian-American TV movie

- Genre: Action; Drama; Thriller
- Based on: The Park Is Mine by Stephen Peters
- Screenplay by: Lyle Gorch
- Directed by: Steven Hilliard Stern
- Starring: Tommy Lee Jones; Helen Shaver; Eric Peterson; Yaphet Kotto
- Theme music composer: Christopher Franke; Edgar Froese; Johannes Schmoelling (Tangerine Dream)
- Country of origin: Canada
- Original language: English

Production
- Producers: Denis Héroux; John Kemeny
- Cinematography: Laszlo George
- Editor: Ronald Sanders
- Running time: 102 minutes
- Production companies: HBO Premiere Films; International Cinema; Ramble Film Productions

Original release
- Network: HBO
- Release: 6 October 1985

The Park Is Mine is a Canadian-American drama television film based on the novel of the same name by Stephen Peters.

== Plot ==
Mitch (played by Tommy Lee Jones), a Vietnam vet, takes temporary forceful control of Central Park from The Big Apple, to remember those who served and died in the Vietnam War and to draw attention to veterans' issues.

== Cast ==
- Tommy Lee Jones as Mitch Garnett
- Helen Shaver as Valery
- Yaphet Kotto as Eubanks
- Lawrence Dane as Commissioner Keller
- Peter Dvorsky as Dix
- Eric Peterson as Mike Johnson
- Gale Garnett as Rachel
- Denis Simpson as Richie
- Reg Dreger as Commander Curran
- Louis Di Bianco as Captain Juliano
- Carl Marotte as Santini
- Dennis O'Connor as Sergeant Duffy
- Tom Harvey as General Bryant
- R.D. Reid as Policeman on Ledge
- George Bloomfield as Dr. Mueller
- Marvin Karon as Warburton
- Jong Soo Park as Tran Chan Dinh
- Peter Langley as Verdanken
- Robert Windsor as Minister
- Stewart Arnott as Newsman, V.A. Hospital
- Jennifer Dean as Detective Balkan
- Andrew Thomson as Transmission Officer
- Allan Aarons as Policeman, V.A. Hospital
- James Kidnie as Policeman in Park
- Michael Copeman as Man at Desk
- Philip Akin as Hardy
- Ardon Bess as Daniels
- Jay Thomas as TV Reporter
- Gregory Francis Kruger as T-Shirt Haggler

== Home media ==
The film was released in 1985 on VHS, by Key Video. It was later released on DVD outside of North America and was unavailable in North America, except for bootlegs. On December 13, 2016, Kino Lorber Studio Classics released the first official Blu-ray and DVD in North America.

== Soundtrack ==
The Park Is Mine

Soundtrack album by Tangerine Dream
- Released: October 1991
- Recorded: 1985
- Genre: Electronic
- Label: Silva Screen
- Producer: Tangerine Dream

Tangerine Dream chronology
Dead Solid Perfect (1991)	The Park Is Mine (1991)	L'Affaire Wallraff (The Man Inside) (1991)

The Park Is Mine is the sixteenth soundtrack album released by Tangerine Dream and their forty-second released album overall. It was recorded in 1985, but not released until 1991. All tracks were composed by: Edgar Froese, Christopher Franke and Johannes Schmoelling.

No.	Title	Length
1.	"The Park Is Mine (Main Title)"	1:16
2.	"Fatal Fall/Funeral"	2:16
3.	"The Letter (Parts 1 & 2)"	5:18
4.	"Taking the Park (Parts 1 & 2)"	8:28
5.	"Swatting S.W.A.T."	7:23
6.	"Love Theme"	3:32
7.	"The Helicopter Attack"	4:40
8.	"Morning"	1:20
9.	"We're Running Out of Time"	1:01
10.	"The Claymore Mine/Stalking"	5:22
11.	"The Final Confrontation/The Park Is Yours!"	3:34
12.	"Finale/End Credits"	6:19
