= Rockoon (Tangerine Dream album) =

- 1992 Miramar original cover

Studio album by Tangerine Dream
- Released: March 1992
- Recorded: March 1991 – January 1992
- Studio: Eastgate Studios (Vienna, Austria) and The Cave (Berlin)
- Genre: Berlin School, electronica, rock, new-age
- Length: 57:48
- Label: Virgin (Europe), Miramar (US)
- Producer: Edgar Froese

Tangerine Dream chronology
Quinoa (1992)	Rockoon (1992)	Deadly Care (1992)

Professional ratings
Review scores
Source	Rating
AllMusic	2.5/5 stars

Rockoon is the forty-fourth major release and twenty-first studio album released by Tangerine Dream. The album was started in March 1991 and completed January 1992, making it the longest production ever in the band's history until the release of Quantum Gate in 2017. The album was nominated in the US for the "Best New Age Album 1992" Grammy and reached the Top Ten in Billboard New Age charts and the Top Twenty in Billboard Jazz charts.

It is the first full album of Tangerine Dream music as a father and son duo. Saxophone player Linda Spa who joined in 1990 does not appear on this release.

The album was re-released in 1999 on Tangerine Dream's own TDI label with new cover artwork by Edgar Froese.

== Track listing ==
No.	Title	Writer(s)	Length
1.	"Big City Dwarves"	Jerome Froese	6:00
2.	"Red Roadster"	Jerome Froese	8:30
3.	"Touchwood"	Jerome Froese	4:34
4.	"Graffiti Street"	Jerome Froese	5:04
5.	"Funky Atlanta"	Edgar Froese	4:00
6.	"Spanish Love"	Edgar Froese	5:40
7.	"Lifted Veil"	Jerome Froese	3:30
8.	"Penguin Reference"	Jerome Froese	4:45
9.	"Body Corporate"	Edgar Froese	3:40
10.	"Rockoon"	Jerome Froese	7:21
11.	"Girls on Broadway"	Jerome Froese	4:44

== Personnel ==
Tangerine Dream

- Edgar Froese - composer, musician
- Jerome Froese - composer, musician

Future Tangerine Dream

- Zlatko Perica - musician

Additional musicians:

- Enrico Fernandez - musician
- Richi Wester - musician

Technical:

- David Marino - recording engineer
- Phillip Calvert - recording engineer
- Jeff Robinson - recording engineer

== Rockoon Special Edition ==
Rockoon was accompanied by a special limited single edition CD-5. It included an edited version of the title track, the bonus track "Oriental Haze" featuring Linda Spa and an interview with Edgar Froese.

No.	Title	Length
1.	"Rockoon (Special Radio Edit)"	4:16
2.	"Oriental Haze"	3:58
3.	"Interview by Joanne Davenport with Edgar Froese"	14:31

== Big City Dwarves ==
"Big City Dwarves" was used as a promo single with a release of 200 to 300 copies.

No.	Title	Length
1.	"Big City Dwarves"	3:45
2.	"Penguin Reference"	4:45
