= The Keep (Tangerine Dream album) =

Studio album by Tangerine Dream
- Released: 1997
- Recorded: 1983
- Genre: Soundtrack
- Length: 60:06
- Label: TDI
- Producer: Tangerine Dream

Tangerine Dream chronology
TimeSquare – Dream Mixes II (1997)	The Keep (1997)	Ambient Monkeys (1997)

The Keep (1997) is the twenty-third soundtrack album by Tangerine Dream and their fifty-eighth overall. It is the soundtrack to the movie The Keep (1983). A limited run of 150 CDs were sold at a concert by the group in the UK in 1997. Virgin soon announced that the album would be available for general release in early 1998, but legal issues with the film studio stopped the release. In 1999, Tangerine Dream's own record label sold 300 copies of the Millennium Booster album set that included The Keep with a different cover.

It was finally given a proper release in 2020, as part of the Pilots of Purple Twilight: The Virgin Recordings 1980–1983 boxset. This release omitted three tracks, and has a different track sequence.

== Track listing ==
No.	Title	Writer(s)	Length
1.	"Puer Natus Est Nobis (Gloria Theme)"	Thomas Tallis	3:09
2.	"Ancient Powerplant"	Edgar Froese	4:28
3.	"The Silver Seal"	Edgar Froese, Johannes Schmoelling	3:07
4.	"Voices from a Common Land"	Edgar Froese, Chris Franke, Johannes Schmoelling	4:06
5.	"Arx Allemand"	Edgar Froese	4:24
6.	"The Night in Romania"	Edgar Froese	3:15
7.	"Canzone"	Edgar Froese, Johannes Schmoelling	2:51
8.	"Sign in the Dark"	Edgar Froese	4:19
9.	"Weird Village"	Edgar Froese, Johannes Schmoelling	3:23
10.	"Love and Destiny"	Edgar Froese, Johannes Schmoelling	3:31
11.	"The Challenger's Arrival"	Edgar Froese	4:32
12.	"Supernatural Accomplice"	Edgar Froese	4:07
13.	"Parallel Worlds"	Edgar Froese, Johannes Schmoelling	4:29
14.	"Truth and Fiction"	Edgar Froese	2:52
15.	"Wardays Sunrise"	Edgar Froese	3:20
16.	"Heritage Survival"	Edgar Froese, Chris Franke, Johannes Schmoelling	4:13

Of the sixteen songs on the soundtrack, only four actually were actually used in the film. "Puer Natus Est Nobis" is a Christmas mass composed by Thomas Tallis around 1554 - this track is from the introit, "Gloria", and is credited as "Gloria" from the "Mass for Four Voices". "Canzone" is an original composition used in the film. "Heritage Survival" and "The Night in Romania" are both segments taken from the 1982 Dominion concert, with some slight mixing and overdubbing. Both of these tracks, as well as segments from the Logos Live album can also be heard in the film. "Sign in the Dark" is also taken from the Dominion concert, but was not used in the film.

A rerecorded version of "The Challenger's Arrival" was released on the album Tangerine Dream Plays Tangerine Dream in 2006, and in 2007, "Ancient Powerplant" was included in the Ocean Waves Collection, available for download from the Tangerine Dream website.

== Personnel ==
- Edgar Froese– guitars, vocoder voices, keyboards
- Christopher Franke– additional keyboards
- Johannes Schmoelling– additional keyboards and drumcomputer

Additional personnel

- Bob Badamy– music supervisor
- Michael Mann– executive producer
- Jerome Froese– master

== The vinyl release ==
A persistent story that The Keep was released on 12" vinyl in 1984 has become an urban legend. Several Tangerine Dream fans relate a story whereby they saw the record in the shops but were not able to purchase it due to a lack of funds. Upon returning to the shop, they found that the record has been withdrawn for some nebulous legal reason, and that all copies have been destroyed. No actual copies of such a vinyl release had ever been noted publicly by any collector until 2013.

A bootleg LP pressing of the 1984 LP was issued in 2001 in Italy or France under the title The Keep Original Motion Picture Soundtrack, on Sunday Records (SUN-65275). Almost no one realized at the time that the music on it was from the 1984 LP and not the leaked studio tapes that comprised the contents of most of the bootleg CDs nor the official TDI CDs, and so many of the people who own this bootleg LP might never have played it and therefore don't realize its significance to this day. A track from this LP entitled "The Night in Romania" appeared on YouTube on 16 December 2013, said to commemorate the 30th Anniversary of the release of the film. This track was discovered years ago by Stéphane Piter, who has a website devoted to the film and is making a documentary on the film, but he didn't think the track was real until he shared it with Steven Feldman of the website Molasar's Homepage on 29 October 2013. Steven recognized that this version of "The Night in Romania" is not the same as the version on the officially-released TDI CD, mainly because the track ends like the version in the film, not the version on the TDI CD. Notably, a studio version of this tune had never been bootlegged.

Additionally, Kit Rae premiered a photo of what may be the front cover of the 1984 LP on his website The Keep Score by Tangerine Dream: Strange Obsessions for the Music from an Obscure 1983 Supernatural Horror Film in November 2013.

== Radio interviews ==
In 1987, Sender Freies Berlin interviewed Edgar Froese, and three tracks from The Keep were played.

1. "Gloria"– a segment of "Puer Natus Est Nobis"
2. "Romanian Road"– later titled "Voices from a Common Land"
3. "Sailing Mission"

Westdeutscher Rundfunk interviewed Froese in 1989 and played three tracks from The Keep:

1. "Fisherman's Morning"– a version of "Ancient Powerplant"
2. "Sailing Mission"
3. "Gloria"

== Bootlegs ==
Tangerine Dream scored the film The Keep in 1983, but the first issue of the soundtrack The Keep (1997) was a limited run of 150 CDs sold at a concert in the UK. Virgin soon announced that the album would be available for general release in early 1998, but legal issues with the film studio stopped the release. In 1999, the TDI label sold 300 copies of the Millennium Booster album set that included The Keep with a different cover. Out of sixteen tracks on the official release, only four were actually used in the movie. The scarcity of the official release led to high resale prices. This and the lack of the actual film music has led to an unusual number of unofficial, bootleg and fan releases.

- 70/90 (1990); Includes two tracks from The Keep.
- Rare Trax 1 (1991); A Keen Auricle fan release which includes "Romanian Road" and "Gloria".
- The Keep (First Mix)
- The Complete Works of the Keep (1994)
- The Keep (1995) Boot Moon Records; Sourced from a studio master tape, a 1985 German radio broadcast and from the bootleg CD 70/90.
- Logotypes (1997); also known as Logos Types because of one of the cover titles.
- Electronic Orgy (1997); Includes the tracks "Fisherman's Morning", "Romanian Road", "Sailing Mission" and "Gloria".
- The Keep (1999), Event Horizon
- The Keep (2001) Orange Records; Used the sixteen tracks from the TDI release, plus tracks from Logos Live (1982), Tangents (1994), The Hollywood Years Vol. 2 (1997) and Antique Dreams (2000).
- The Keep Ultimate Edition (2001)
- The Keep (2003); A counterfeit version using the same cover and liner as the 1997 TDI release, but packaged in a standard jewel case instead of a digipak.
- Tangerine Dream— The Keep Cues; Contains seven untitled tracks. The album was published by Ricochet Dream as a release of 222 numbered CDs issued for fans attending the 2008 Ricochet Gathering in Transylvania, Romania to celebrate the 25th anniversary of the film.
- Tangerine Tree 54: The Keep: An Alternative View (2004); A Tangerine Tree fan release.
- Ricochet Gathering— Keep On (2010) Ricochet Dream
- The Keep; A CD-R version of the supposed promo LP
- The Complete Laserdisc Soundtrack to The Keep; Sourced from the laserdisc release of the film.

== Covers ==
- (1995) The Keep by the Fantasy Merchants; First Floor/Tsunami
1. The Keep – Main Title 4:49
2. Glacken's Quest 4:24
3. Brothers In Death 8:13
4. Fisherman's Morning 3:37
5. The Challenger's Arrival 4:54
6. Gloria 3:15

== Fan releases ==
- (2004) Tangerine Tree Volume 54– The Keep: An Alternative View
