= Plays Tangerine Dream =

Compilation album by Tangerine Dream
- Released: December 2006
- Recorded: 2006
- Genre: Electronic
- Length: 72:39
- Label: Eastgate Music
- Producer: Edgar Froese

Tangerine Dream chronology
Detroit–March 31st 1977 (2006)	Plays Tangerine Dream (2006)	Preston-November 5th 1980 (2008)

Plays Tangerine Dream is the ninety-sixth release and second compilation by the German electronic music group Tangerine Dream. It features re-recordings and remixes by several present and past members of the band.

== Track listing ==
No.	Title	Length
1.	"Southpole Crossing" (performed by Paul Haslinger)	4:10
2.	"Logos Blue" (performed by Ralf Wadephul)	6:00
3.	"Alchemy of the Heart II" (performed by Paul Haslinger, Edgar Froese)	4:29
4.	"Beach Theme" (performed by Zlatko Perica)	3:39
5.	"Phaedra 2005" (performed by Edgar Froese)	5:50
6.	"Desert T. Dream" (performed by Ralf Wadephul)	4:02
7.	"Convention of the 24" (performed by Edgar Froese)	9:25
8.	"The Blue Bridge" (performed by Thorsten Quaeschning, Linda Spa)	3:33
9.	"Ride on a Ray" (performed by Edgar Froese)	8:44
10.	"Logos Velvet" (performed by Thorsten Quaeschning)	5:09
11.	"Challengers Arrival" (performed by Edgar Froese)	4:07
12.	"Sphinx Red Lightning" (performed by Edgar Froese)	4:56
13.	"Pergamon Sphere" (performed by Johannes Schmoelling)	5:01
14.	"Loved by the Sun" (performed by Thorsten Quaeschning)	3:35

== Personnel ==
- Edgar Froese
- Thorsten Quaeschning
- Linda Spa
- Paul Haslinger
- Zlatko Perica
- Johannes Schmoelling
- Ralf Wadephul
