= Antique Dreams =

Compilation album by Tangerine Dream
- Released: June 2000
- Recorded: 1971–1988
- Genre: Electronic
- Length: 69:50
- Label: TDI/EFA

Tangerine Dream chronology
Soundmill Navigator (2000)	Antique Dreams (2000)	The Seven Letters From Tibet (2000)

Professional ratings
Review scores
Source	Rating
AllMusic	4/5 stars

Antique Dreams is the seventieth release and first compilation album by Tangerine Dream. Compiled and remixed in 2000 and recorded between 1971 and 1988, it is the third and last of the Tangerine Dream Classics Edition series, following Sohoman and Soundmill Navigator. The album features live, studio and remix elements.

== Track listing ==
All music is composed by Edgar Froese, Peter Baumann, Chris Franke, Johannes Schmoelling except where noted

No.	Title	Writer(s)	Length
1.	"Oedipus Tyrannus Overture" (From the theatrical play Oedipus Tyrannus)		5:36
2.	"Ultima Thule Part 1" (From the single Ultima Thule)		3:23
3.	"Calymba Caly" (Live during the 1981 and 1980 European Tours)		9:50
4.	"Flock of Bluebirds" (From Das Mädchen auf der Treppe)		3:34
5.	"Speed Dragon" (From Das Mädchen auf der Treppe)		3:16
6.	"Edinburgh Castle" (Live during the 1981 and 1980 European Tours)		8:46
7.	"Moorland" (From Daydream – Moorland)		4:02
8.	"Sorcerer and Thief" (Remix from Sorcerer and Thief)		6:32
9.	"Southend Mall" (Intended for release on Le Parc)		4:29
10.	"Cool Breeze of Brighton" (Live during the 1986 UK tour)		10:19
11.	"Phaedra of Nottingham" (1988 live version from Phaedra)		5:22
12.	"House of the Rising Sun" (With Ralf Wadephul)	Traditional	4:41

== Other releases ==
In October 2007 the album was released as Antique Dream Land as a MP3 download at the Tangerine Dream download shop with a different track listing.

All music is composed by Edgar Froese, Peter Baumann, Chris Franke, Johannes Schmoelling

No.	Title	Length
1.	"Calymba Caly"	9:52
2.	"Flock of Bluebirds"	3:36
3.	"Moorland"	4:05
4.	"Oedipus Tyrannus"	5:38
5.	"Astral Voyager"	6:14
6.	"Phaedra Of Nottingham"	5:20
7.	"Green Desert"	5:28
8.	"Sorcerer and Thief"	6:34
9.	"Southend Mall"	4:31
10.	"Cool Breeze of Brighton"	10:21
11.	"Speed Dragon"	3:18
12.	"Edinburgh Castle"	8:42
