= Tournado (Tangerine Dream album) =

Live album by Tangerine Dream
- Released: September 1997
- Recorded: 23 April 1997
- Venue: Zabrze, Poland
- Genre: Electronic rock
- Length: 1:09:58
- Label: TDI
- Producer: Edgar Froese

Tangerine Dream chronology
Goblins' Club (1996)	Tournado (1997)	TimeSquare – Dream Mixes II (1997)

Professional ratings
Review scores
Source	Rating
AllMusic	4/5 stars

Tournado is the eighth live album by Tangerine Dream and their fifty-sixth overall. It is the first live album released by the group to feature no new compositions.

== Reception ==
Dave Connolly of AllMusic gave the album four out of five stars, stating that the album "might be the best place to start" for those interested in works produced by Tangerine Dream in the 1990s.

== Track listing ==
No.	Title	Length
1.	"Intro"	3:40
2.	"Flashflood"	7:49
3.	"220 Volt (Big Volt Version)"	8:18
4.	"Firetongues"	7:11
5.	"Girls on Broadway"	5:07
6.	"Little Blond in the Park of Attractions"	7:40
7.	"Rising Haul in Silence"	7:49
8.	"Lamb With Radar Eyes"	7:42
9.	"Touchwood"	7:40
10.	"Towards The Evening Star"	7:02

== Personnel ==
Tangerine Dream

- Edgar Froese – keyboards
- Jerome Froese – keyboards
- Zlatko Perica – electric guitar

Guest musicians

- Emil Hachfeld – electronic drums
