= Valentine Wheels =

Live album by Tangerine Dream
- Released: December 1998
- Recorded: November 6th, 1997
- Venue: London
- Genre: Electronic rock
- Length: 59:07
- Label: TDI Music
- Producer: Edgar Froese

Tangerine Dream chronology
Transsiberia (1998)	Valentine Wheels (1998)	Sohoman (1998)

Valentine Wheels is the sixty-fourth release and ninth live album by Tangerine Dream. The album was recorded in 1997 from the first half of the Shepherds Bush concert. The album was initially available only through the internet. The next year, the album was officially released at retail. This is the final album to feature guitarist Zlatko Perica as a member.

== Track listing ==
No.	Title	Length
1.	"Waterborne"	6:21
2.	"Betrayal"	2:58
3.	"Poland"	8:11
4.	"Sundance Kid"	6:03
5.	"Silver Scale"	7:13
6.	"Warsaw in the Sun"	5:23
7.	"Stratosfear 95"	8:17
8.	"Dolphin Dance"	6:26
9.	"Le Parc"	3:52
10.	"Beach Theme"	4:23

== Personnel ==
Tangerine Dream

- Edgar Froese - keyboards
- Jerome Froese - keyboards
- Zlatko Perica - guitar

Guest musicians

- Emil Hachfeld - percussion
