= Livemiles =

- 1988 LP album cover

Live album by Tangerine Dream
- Released: April 1988
- Recorded: 1 August 1987; 8 June 1986
- Genre: Electronic
- Length: 57:05
- Labels: Jive Electro; Caroline
- Producers: Edgar Froese; Chris Franke; Paul Haslinger

Tangerine Dream chronology
Shy People (1988)	Livemiles (1988)	Optical Race (1988)

Alternative cover
- 1996 CD cover

Professional ratings
Review scores
Source	Rating
Allmusic	3/5 stars

Livemiles (later known as Live Miles) is the thirty-fourth major release and sixth live album by Tangerine Dream. It is the last album with Chris Franke. The first half of the album purports to be a recording of the June 8, 1986 concert in Albuquerque, New Mexico, USA, and the second half of the album from a concert in West Berlin on August 1, 1987, Germany. In reality none of the album was recorded live, instead all created in the studio, as contract filler for their label Jive Electro.

== Track listing ==
No.	Title	Length
1.	"Livemiles Part One (The Albuquerque Concert)"	29:52
2.	"Livemiles Part Two (The West-Berlin Concert)"	27:13

== Personnel ==
- Edgar Froese
- Chris Franke
- Paul Haslinger

== Sources ==
From its release, the venue and recording history behind Livemiles have been questioned. Careful analysis of the complete audience recording from the Albuquerque concert (including the soundchecks) reveals that none of the "Albuquerque Concert" on Livemiles originates from this show. Further, careful listening to other concert recordings from the 1986 American tour suggest that this material was likely recorded after the 1986 tour. Some of this material did feature in concerts played in 1988 after the departure of artist Chris Franke.

Jerome Froese “Okay let's explode a myth. Live Miles was a part of a fake 'live' release and a compromise to get out of the contract with Jive Electro because they had the option for another TD studio album. Quite touch-and-go, cause EF did sign up with Private Music for Optical Race. Pre-concert announcements came from a Bolivian friend of Edgar and an American girl who worked in our office”
