= 220 Volt =

220 Volt is a common mains electricity voltage. It may also refer to:

- 220 Volt Live, a 1993 album by Tangerine Dream
- 220 Volt (band), a Swedish heavy metal band active in the 1980s and 2000s
- 220 Volts (TV series), a 2011 Brazilian comedy show on Multishow hosted by Paulo Gustavo
