= Canyon Dreams =

Soundtrack album by Tangerine Dream
- Released: 1991
- Recorded: 1986
- Studios: Polygon Studios (Berlin), Eastgate Studios (Vienna
- Genres: Electronic; soundtrack; new-age
- Length: 40:31
- Label: Miramar
- Producer: Edgar Froese

Tangerine Dream chronology
Melrose (1990)	Canyon Dreams (1991)	Dead Solid Perfect (1991)

Professional ratings
Review scores
Source	Rating
AllMusic	4.5/5 stars

Canyon Dreams is the fortieth major release and (although mostly recorded in 1986) it was released as the fourteenth soundtrack album by German band Tangerine Dream. It was recorded in 1986 and released in 1991 on compact disc and compact cassette formats. The music was written as a sound accompaniment for an eponymous scenic video film about the Grand Canyon by Jan Nickman, released by the record label Miramar in 1987 on VHS, Betamax and LaserDisc. The album's tracks are divided into various episodes and related to the titles of the cuts.

This album has musical influences from Native American cultures. Edgar Froese, Christoph Franke, and Paul Haslinger created sequenced, atmospheric soundscapes using a Native American pace and native flutes to give the disc a feel of the American Southwest. The execution is recognizable as a product of the Berlin School of electronic music, and brought Tangerine Dream their first Grammy nomination.

The music on Canyon Dreams has influenced contemporary musicians, including Soulfood, Steve Roach, Matthias Gohl, and Michael Stearns.

== History ==
In 1991, the soundtrack of the video release Canyon Dreams was released as the first TD album by the Seattle-based company Miramar, beginning the band's Seattle Years period. Canyon Dreams was nominated for the Grammy Award for Best New Age Album 1991. Some months before its release, a bootleg version of the soundtrack titled The Canyon Dreams, featuring the music from the video, was released. The music on the official soundtrack was partially remixed with slightly different running times and features the bonus track "Colorado Dawn" composed by Jerome Froese.

The album was re-released in 1999 by TDI; this release features an additional track, "Rocky Mountain Hawk", and a redesigned booklet, which includes the following sleeve notes about the Grand Canyon:

Two billion years of geological evidence of the earth's history is exposed in the canyon's rock walls, more than can be observed anywhere else in the world. Travelling The canyon's length requires a river journey of 277 miles, through canyons varying in distance from less than a half-mile to more than eighteen miles apart, and through depths reaching nearly 600 feet. Early visitors named many of the large buttes after ancient gods. Jupiter, Juno, Apollo, Venus, Vishnu, Deva, Shiva and Brahma have temples here, while Vulcan and Wotan have thrones named in their honor. The Paiute Indians believed the canyon had been created by the god Tavwoats to separate the world of the living from the lands beyond death. Havasupai and Hulapai Indians believed the river was the runoff from an earth-covering flood, much like the one Noah experienced.

In March 2009, the album was re-released with a different cover design as part of a series of 60 CD and DVD releases by the Germany-based record label Membran.

== Track listing ==
All tracks are written by Edgar Froese, Chris Franke, Paul Haslinger except as noted.

No.	Title	Length
1.	"Shadow Flyer"	5:47
2.	"Canyon Carver"	4:20
3.	"Water's Gift"	5:27
4.	"Canyon Voices"	4:28
5.	"Sudden Revelation"	4:48
6.	"A Matter of Time"	8:56
7.	"Purple Nightfall"	2:08
8.	"Colorado Dawn" (Jerome Froese)	4:28
Total length:		40:31

== Personnel ==
- Edgar Froese
- Chris Franke
- Paul Haslinger
