= Ambient Monkeys =

Studio album (mini-album) by Tangerine Dream
- Released: November 1997
- Recorded: 1997
- Studio: Fujiwara Studios
- Genres: Electronic, ambient
- Length: 45:32
- Label: TDI Music
- Producer: Edgar Froese

Tangerine Dream chronology
The Keep (1997)	Ambient Monkeys (1997)	Der Meteor (1997)

Professional ratings
Review scores
Source	Rating
AllMusic	3/5 stars

Ambient Monkeys subtitled (Dream Folder #1 At Crimson's Train Lodge "Myopia World") is the fifty-ninth release by Tangerine Dream.

== Background ==
Right before TD entered the stage during their Europe gigs in 1997, spectators could hear some mellow music overlaid by some nature, animal or environment sounds. "On public demand", as stated in the booklet, this "pre-concert ambient music" has become available on the CD Ambient Monkeys on the TDI label. Pre-release CDs had been sold on the merchandise stall during TD's British tour in November 1997 first. The first version of the CD came with the track "Largo (from Xerxes)". It was released with different cover artwork in June 1998 without "Largo (from Xerxes)" included in the Dream Dice box set, and later also separately. In 1999 Ambient Monkeys was re-released once more with different cover design.

In March 2009, the album was re-released with completely different cover design as part of an extensive digipack series (consisting of a total of more than 60 CD and DVD releases) by the Germany-based Membran record label.

== Track listing ==
All tracks are written by Edgar Froese except where noted.

No.	Title	Writer(s)	Length
1.	"Token From Birdland (1997 remix)"		5:59
2.	"Symphony In A Minor"	J.S. Bach	3:26
3.	"The Seventh Propeller Of Silence"		3:51
4.	"Calyx Calamander"	Edgar Froese, Jerome Froese	4:41
5.	"Largo (From Xerxes) (1997 remix)"	George Frideric Handel	3:04
6.	"Riddle Of The Monkey Tribe"		3:42
7.	"Moon Marble"		3:32
8.	"Concerto In A-Major / Adagio"	Mozart	1:46
9.	"Lemon Vendor Khaly"		3:37
10.	"Campera De Mon Glyan"		4:47
11.	"Virtue Is Its Own Reward"		3:10
12.	"Pantha Rhei"		3:15
13.	"Myopia World"		3:46

== Personnel ==
- Jerome Froese - composer and performer
- Edgar Froese - composer and performer

Other personnel

Gisela Kloetzer - performed on original version of "Largo (From Xerxes)" from the 1995 album Tyranny of Beauty so she technically performs on this album.
