= 220 Volt Live =

- Original release cover

Live album by Tangerine Dream
- Released: June 4, 1993
- Recorded: various dates in October and November 1992
- Genres: Electronic rock, new-age, synthpop
- Length: 72:40
- Label: Miramar
- Producer: Edgar Froese

Tangerine Dream chronology
| Deadly Care (1992) | 220 Volt Live (1993) | Turn of the Tides (1994) |

Professional ratings
Review scores
| Source | Rating |
|---|---|
| AllMusic | 4/5 stars |

220 Volt Live is the forty-eighth release and seventh live album by Tangerine Dream. It was recorded live in the US in 1992. It would be the last live album to feature new compositions until Inferno (2002). This may be considered some of the band's most rock oriented music so far, with guitarist Zlatko Perica's playing being a more prominent element. Re-issued in 1999 and then again in 2009 on Membran. It was nominated for Best New Age Album at the 1994 Grammy Awards.

== Track listing ==
All music is composed by Edgar Froese, Jerome Froese.

| No. | Title | Length |
|---|---|---|
| 1. | "Oriental Haze" | 6:52 |
| 2. | "Two Bunch Palms" | 5:48 |
| 3. | "220 Volt" | 9:01 |
| 4. | "Homeless" | 9:48 |
| 5. | "Sundance Kid" | 8:04 |
| 6. | "Backstreet Hero" | 8:49 |
| 7. | "The Blue Bridge" | 4:47 |
| 8. | "Hamlet" | 8:30 |
| 9. | "Dreamtime" | 3:46 |
| 10. | "Purple Haze" (written by Jimi Hendrix) | 3:32 |
| 11. | "Treasure Of Innocence" (studio track) | 3:41 |

== Personnel ==
Tangerine Dream

- Edgar Froese – keyboards, guitar
- Jerome Froese – keyboards, guitar
- Linda Spa – saxophone, keyboards
- Zlatko Perica – guitar

== Single ==
Dreamtime was released alongside 220 Volt Live in 1993. It contains three shortened tracks from the album, plus the studio version of their cover of "Purple Haze", and an alternate version of Dreamtime. This alternate version had lyrics written and performed by Jayney Klimek and Julie Ocean contributed to the lyric writing process.

=== Track listing ===
| No. | Title | Length |
|---|---|---|
| 1. | "Dreamtime (vocal version)" (Vocals by Jayney Klimek) | 3:40 |
| 2. | "The Blue Bridge (1992 live excerpt)" | 3:54 |
| 3. | "Treasure of Innocence" | 3:37 |
| 4. | "Dreamtime (1992 live excerpt)" | 3:18 |
| 5. | "Purple Haze (studio version)" | 2:57 |
