= Jeanne d'Arc (Tangerine Dream album) =

Studio album by Tangerine Dream
- Released: September 2005
- Recorded: June 2005
- Studios: Eastgate Studios, Vienna, Austria
- Genre: Electronic music
- Length: 79:16
- Label: TDI Music
- Producer: Edgar Froese

Tangerine Dream chronology
Kyoto (2005)	Jeanne d'Arc (2005)	Rocking Mars (2005)

Main studio albums chronology
Mars Polaris (1999)	Jeanne d'Arc (2005)	Madcap's Flaming Duty (2007)

Professional ratings
Review scores
Source	Rating
Release Magazine	3/10

Jeanne D'Arc – La Révolte Éternelle (English: Joan of Arc – The Eternal Revolt) is the eighty-ninth release and twenty-sixth major studio album by German electronic music group Tangerine Dream. It was recorded during June 2005 at Eastgate Studios in Vienna, Austria and released in September 2005 through TDI Music. Jeanne d'Arc is the first Tangerine Dream album to feature Thorsten Quaeschning as a full-time member. The album also features a returning Linda Spa on saxophone. This is her first appearance on a Tangerine Dream album since Goblins' Club in 1996. Jerome Froese makes his final appearance after joining his father in 1990 for the Melrose album.

== Track listing ==
1. "La Vision" – 12:19 (Edgar Froese)
2. "La Joie" – 5:16 (Thorsten Quaeschning)
3. "La Force Du Courage" – 8:37 (Edgar Froese)
4. "La Solitude Dans l'Espoir" – 7:32 (Jerome Froese)
5. "La Marche" – 8:36 (Jerome Froese)
6. "La Sagesse Du Destin" – 7:58 (Thorsten Quaeschning)
7. "Le Combat Du Sang" – 10:17 (Jerome Froese)
8. "Le Combat Des Épées" – 14:02 (Thorsten Quaeschning)
9. "La Libération" – 4:39 (Thorsten Quaeschning)

== Personnel ==
- Edgar Froese – keyboards, producer, cover artist
- Jerome Froese – keyboards
- Thorsten Quaeschning – keyboards
- Linda Spa – saxophone, flute
- Iris Camaa – V-drums, percussion
