= Tyranny of Beauty =

Studio album by Tangerine Dream
- Released: 1995
- Recorded: July–September 1994
- Genre: Berlin School, electronica
- Length: 57:25 or 61:08
- Label: Virgin
- Producer: Edgar Froese

Tangerine Dream chronology
Catch Me If You Can (1994)	Tyranny of Beauty (1995)	The Dream Mixes (1995)

Professional ratings
Review scores
Source	Rating
AllMusic	4/5 stars

Tyranny of Beauty (1995) is the fifty-first release and twenty-third major studio album by Tangerine Dream. Guitarist Zlatko Perica does not appear on this album or its follow up Goblins' Club (1996). His absence is filled by guest musicians Gerald Gradwohl and Mark Hornby on both releases and during the groups London performance in November 1996.

== Track listing ==
No.	Title	Writer(s)	Length
1.	"Catwalk"	Jerome Froese	7:19
2.	"Birdwatcher's Dream"	Edgar Froese	6:52
3.	"Little Blonde in the Park of Attractions"	Jerome Froese	6:57
4.	"Living in a Fountain Pen"	Edgar Froese	6:59
5.	"Stratosfear 1995 (Re-recording)"	Edgar Froese, Chris Franke, Peter Baumann	5:08
6.	"Bride in Cold Tears"	Jerome Froese	4:53
7.	"Haze of Fame"	Edgar Froese	8:30
8.	"Tyranny of Beauty"	Edgar Froese	6:35
9.	"Largo" (from 'Xerxes')	George Frideric Handel	4:12
10.	"Quasar" (included on re-releases)	Jerome Froese	3:43

== Personnel ==
Tangerine Dream

- Edgar Froese – electric and acoustic guitar, keyboards, twelve-string guitar, drums, recording engineer, composer, producer
- Jerome Froese – electric and acoustic guitar, keyboards, drums, percussion, recording engineer, composer
- Linda Spa – alto and soprano saxophones, English horn, sax arrangement on "Largo"

Additional musicians

- Gerald Gradwohl – electric and acoustic guitar
- Mark Hornby – electric and acoustic guitar, twelve-string guitar, EBow

Credits

- Christian Gstettner – recording engineer
- Peter Baumann – composer "Stratosfear"
- Christopher Franke – composer "Stratosfear"
- George Frideric Handel – composer "Largo"
- Gisela Kloetzer – string arrangements on "Largo"

== Promo ==
A promotional CD-5 was released with edited versions of four tracks and the bonus track "Quasar", which was released on later versions of Tyranny of Beauty.

No.	Title	Length
1.	"Catwalk [Excerpt]"	4:29
2.	"Little Blonde in the Park of Attractions [Excerpt]"	4:37
3.	"Living in a Fountain Pen"	5:07
4.	"Birdwatcher's Dream"	6:52
5.	"Quasar"	3:43

== CD-ROM ==
A CD-ROM of the same title was published in Italy in 1995 as a freebie with the magazine New Age and New Sounds (catalogue no. NANS 047/B). Apart from the multimedia content it includes two audio tracks:

No.	Title	Length
1.	"Catwalk (Special Version)"	15:14
2.	"Quasar"	3:43
