= Phaedra =

Phaedra may refer to:

== Mythology ==
- Phaedra (mythology), Cretan princess, daughter of Minos and Pasiphaë, wife of Theseus

== Arts and entertainment ==
- Phaedra (Cabanel), an 1880 painting by Alexandre Cabanel

=== Film ===
- Phaedra (film), a 1962 film by Jules Dassin based on the Phaedra myth
- Phaedra Cinema, a distributor of films in the US of the late 20th century

=== Music ===
- Phaedra (album) (1974), by the electronic music group Tangerine Dream
  - Phaedra 2005, a later album by Tangerine Dream
- Phaedra (cantata), a cantata by Benjamin Britten based on the Phaedra myth
- Phaedra, a mysterious woman referred to in the song "Some Velvet Morning" sung by Nancy Sinatra and Lee Hazlewood
- Phaedra (opera), an opera by Hans Werner Henze based on the Phaedra myth
- Phèdre (opera), an opera by Jean-Baptiste Lemoyne
- Phaedra (Phèdre), a character in the opera Hippolytus and Aricia by Jean-Philippe Rameau
- Phaedra (CD label), an independent classical CD-label, publishing Belgian and especially Flemish music

=== Plays ===
- Phaedra (Seneca), a play by Seneca the Younger
- Phaedra (Sophocles), a lost tragedy by Sophocles
- Phèdre, play by Jean Racine

== People ==
- Phaedra Parks (born 1976), American lawyer and reality television personality and cast member on The Real Housewives of Atlanta and cast member on Married to Medicine

== Science ==
- 174 Phaedra, an asteroid
- Phaedra, synonym of Bernardia, a plant genus
- Phaedra (butterfly), a butterfly genus

== See also ==
- Fedra (disambiguation), Italian spelling of Phaedra
- Phaedrus (disambiguation)
- The 4th Colossus from Shadow of the Colossus
