= Soundmill Navigator =

- Cover by Edgar Froese

Live album by Tangerine Dream
- Released: April 2000
- Recorded: 1976
- Genre: Ambient, electronica
- Length: 41:46
- Label: TDI/EFA
- Producer: Edgar Froese

Tangerine Dream chronology
| Great Wall of China (1999) | Soundmill Navigator (2000) | Antique Dreams (2000) |

Professional ratings
Review scores
| Source | Rating |
|---|---|
| AllMusic | 4/5 stars |

Soundmill Navigator is the sixty-ninth release and eleventh live album by Tangerine Dream. Remixed and released in April 2000, it is sourced from the 27 June 1976 concert at the Berliner Philharmonie. It is the second in the Tangerine Dream Classics Edition series, following Sohoman and preceding Antique Dreams.

== Track listing ==
All music is composed by Edgar Froese, Chris Franke, Peter Baumann

| No. | Title | Length |
|---|---|---|
| 1. | "Soundmill Navigator" | 41:46 |

== Other releases ==
The original concert was released as Tangerine Tree Volume 8: Berlin 1976 which was later officially released as part of The Bootleg Box Set Vol. 1.
