= Sohoman =

Live album with studio elements by Tangerine Dream
- Released: 1999
- Recorded: 22 February 1982, 1999
- Venue: Regent Theatre
- Genres: Electronic, new-age, synthpop
- Length: 42:53
- Label: TDI/EFA
- Producer: Edgar Froese

Tangerine Dream chronology
Valentine Wheels (1998)	Sohoman (1999)	Mars Polaris (1999)

Sohoman is the sixty-fifth release and tenth live album by Tangerine Dream. Remixed and released in 1999, it is sourced from the first set of the 22 February 1982 concert at the Regent Theatre in Sydney Australia. When compared to fan recordings, Sohoman was heavily edited in the studio. It is the first in the Tangerine Dream Classics Edition series, preceding Soundmill Navigator and Antique Dreams.

== Track listing ==
All music is composed by Edgar Froese, Chris Franke, Johannes Schmoelling.

No.	Title	Length
1.	"Convention Of The 24"	9:17
2.	"White Eagle"	4:31
3.	"Ayers Majestic"	7:11
4.	"Logos, Part One"	8:32
5.	"Bondi Parade" (Misspelled as Bondy Parade; retitled in later releases)	13:22

== Other releases ==
Leprous Appearance On Wednesday is a bootleg LP released in 1984 that contains the same part of the concert as Sohoman. This bootleg was re-released in 1993 as a CD titled Dreaming. The fan release Tangerine Tree Volume 37: Sydney 1982 was released in 2003 and consists of the complete concert recorded from a radio broadcast.
