= Melrose (album) =

Studio album by Tangerine Dream
- Released: October 1990
- Recorded: June – July 1990
- Genre: Electronic
- Length: 59:00
- Label: Private Music
- Producer: Edgar Froese

Tangerine Dream chronology
Destination Berlin (1989)	Melrose (1990)	Canyon Dreams (1991)

Professional ratings
Review scores
Source	Rating
AllMusic	4/5 stars

Melrose is the thirty-ninth major release and twentieth studio album by Tangerine Dream. The album was released in 1990 on the Private Music label founded by former Tangerine Dream member Peter Baumann. The album further developed the instrumental pop style known from the previous two Private Music albums, Optical Race and Lily on the Beach. Edgar Froese's son, Jerome, for the first time appears on a Tangerine Dream album as a full-time member. This was Paul Haslinger's last album with Tangerine Dream.

== Track listing ==
All music by Edgar Froese and Paul Haslinger except where noted.

No.	Title	Length
1.	"Melrose" (Jerome Froese)	5:44
2.	"Three Bikes in the Sky"	5:58
3.	"Dolls in the Shadow" (Jerome Froese)	5:10
4.	"Yucatan"	5:16
5.	"Electric Lion"	8:13
6.	"Rolling Down Cahuenga"	6:43
7.	"Art of Vision" (Jerome Froese)	5:30
8.	"Desert Train"	10:17
9.	"Cool at Heart"	6:09

== Personnel ==
Tangerine Dream

- Edgar Froese – keyboards, lead guitar, rhythm guitar
- Jerome Froese – keyboards, lead guitar
- Paul Haslinger – keyboards

Guest musicians

- Hubert Waldner – saxophone on "Melrose"

Credits

- Jim Rakete – cover photos
