= Rumpelstiltskin (album) =

Studio album by Tangerine Dream
- Released: 1991
- Recorded: 1991
- Studio: Eastgate Studios (Vienna)
- Length: 44:36
- Label: Kid Rhino / Rabbit Ears
- Producer: Edgar Froese

Tangerine Dream chronology
L'Affaire Wallraff (The Man Inside) (1991)	Rumpelstiltskin (1991)	Quinoa (1992)

Professional ratings
Review scores
Source	Rating
AllMusic	4.5/5 stars

Rumpelstiltskin is the eighteenth soundtrack album by Tangerine Dream and forty-fifth overall.

In 1991, the US based Rabbit Ears label released the tale in their audio novel series for children. The story was told by actress Kathleen Turner and the accompanying music was composed and performed by Tangerine Dream exclusively for this recording. During the 22 minute story the material is used as background and intermediate music, and additionally the album features all seven compositions as instrumental tracks.

== Track listing ==
No.	Title	Length
1.	"Rumpelstiltskin" (narration by Kathleen Turner)	22:00
2.	"Rumpelstiltskin Theme"	2:55
3.	"Alchemy of Straw"	2:54
4.	"Rumpel Town"	4:19
5.	"The Countryside"	2:22
6.	"A Walk Through the Woods"	4:35
7.	"Dance on the Hill"	3:09
8.	"A Mother's Triumph"	2:22

== Personnel ==
- Edgar Froese
- Jerome Froese
