= The Prodigal (1983 film) =

- Theatrical release poster
- Directed by: James F. Collier
- Written by: James F. Collier
- Based on: Parable of the Prodigal Son
- Produced by: Ken Wales
- Starring: John Hammond; Hope Lange; John Cullum; Morgan Brittany; Ian Bannen; Joey Travolta; Arliss Howard
- Cinematography: Frank Stanley
- Edited by: Bill Brame
- Music by: Bruce Broughton
- Color process: Technicolor
- Distributed by: World Wide Pictures
- Release date: January 1, 1983
- Running time: 109 minutes
- Country: United States

The Prodigal is a 1983 film directed by James F. Collier. It is a retelling of the story of the prodigal son and stars John Hammond, Hope Lange, John Cullum, Morgan Brittany, Ian Bannen, Joey Travolta, and Arliss Howard.

== Cast ==
- John Hammond as Greg Stuart
- Hope Lange as Anne Stuart
- John Cullum as Elton Stuart
- Morgan Brittany as Sheila Holt-Browning
- Ian Bannen as Riley Wyndham
- Joey Travolta as Tony
- Arliss Howard as Scott Stuart
- Sarah Rush as Laura
- Gerry Gibson as Reverend Wharton
