= Quinoa (album) =

- 1998 reissue cover

Studio album (mini-album) by Tangerine Dream
- Released: February 1992; 14 July 1998
- Recorded: 1992–1997, The Cave (Berlin)
- Genre: Electronic music
- Length: 28:30, 49:13
- Labels: Volt Records, TDI
- Producer: Edgar Froese

Tangerine Dream chronology
Rumpelstiltskin (1991)	Quinoa (1992)	Rockoon (1992)

Professional ratings
Review scores
Source	Rating
AllMusic	3/5 stars

Quinoa is the forty-sixth release by the German band Tangerine Dream.

== Background ==
Quinoa was released in February 1992 as a limited edition of 1000 copies. It was sent out as a special gift to members of the now defunct official TD International Fan Club, and the remaining copies were sold during their German tour in 1997. The CD featured one single composition "Quinoa" of 28 minutes.

The album was re-issued on 14 July 1998 on their new label TDI. It was sold in unlimited quantity, and contained two bonus tracks. One of these tracks, "Voxel Ux", was originally composed for a competition on the band's official 1996 homepage. The winner received a CDR with the track, of which there is only one copy. "Lhasa" was described as the first movement in TD's "Tibetan Cycle", with 6 other tracks within the cycle that remained unreleased until 2000, when they were released as the album The Seven Letters From Tibet. "Lhasa" was extended and became the track "The Blue Pearl".

In March 2009, Quinoa was re-issued again on Membran Music Ltd with new cover art as part of the band's extensive digipack series.

== Track listing ==
Quinoa – Original 1992 release
No.	Title	Writer(s)	Length
1.	"Quinoa"	Edgar Froese, Jerome Froese	28:25

Quinoa – 1998 release
No.	Title	Writer(s)	Length
1.	"Voxel Ux"	Jerome Froese	11:59
2.	"Quinoa"	Edgar Froese, Jerome Froese	28:25
3.	"Lhasa"	Edgar Froese	9:49

== Personnel ==
- Edgar Froese
- Jerome Froese
