= The Blue and the Gray (miniseries) =

1982 American television miniseries

- DVD cover
- Created by: John Leekley and Bruce Catton
- Screenplay by: Ian McLellan Hunter
- Story by: John Leekley and Bruce Catton
- Directed by: Andrew V. McLaglen
- Starring: John Hammond; Stacy Keach; Lloyd Bridges; Gregory Peck
- Theme music composer: Bruce Broughton
- Country of origin: United States
- Original language: English
- No. of episodes: 3

Production
- Producers: Hugh Benson; Harry Thomason
- Editors: Fred A. Chulack; Bud Friedgen
- Running time: 381 minutes
- Production companies: Larry White and Lou Reda Productions; Columbia Pictures Television

Original release
- Network: CBS
- Release: November 14 – November 17, 1982

The Blue and the Gray is a television miniseries that first aired on CBS in three installments on November 14, November 16, and November 17, 1982. Set during the American Civil War, the series starred John Hammond, Stacy Keach, and Lloyd Bridges, and Gregory Peck as President Abraham Lincoln. It was executive produced by Larry White and Lou Reda, in association with Columbia Pictures Television. A novel of the same name by John Leekley was published as a companion to the series in 1982, based on a story by John Leekley and Bruce Catton and the teleplay by Ian McLellan Hunter. The title refers to the colors of the uniforms worn by United States Army and Confederate States Army soldiers respectively.

== Synopsis ==
The plot revolves around the families of two sisters; Maggie Geyser and Evelyn Hale. The Geysers are farmers who reside near Charlottesville, Virginia, and the Hales own a small newspaper in Gettysburg, Pennsylvania. The Geysers are generally indifferent to the issue of slavery, but are sympathetic to the Southern cause. The lone exception in the family is son John, an artistic young man who becomes sympathetic to the plight of Southern slaves and free Negroes. The Hales are pro-Union and anti-slavery, but, like many Northerners at the time, they hope for a peaceful solution to the nation's problems.

The drama begins in 1859 when John leaves the Geyser family farm for Pennsylvania, where he gets a job as an artist correspondent for the paper owned by his uncle, Jacob Hale, Sr. John's first assignment takes him to the trial of abolitionist John Brown, where he meets and befriends the mysterious Jonas Steele, a former Jayhawker and Pinkerton detective. Jonas returns with John to Gettysburg and falls in love with John's cousin Mary, but is afraid to commit to her, thanks to his troubling dreams that seem to predict the future.

After falling out with his family over the issues of slavery and secession during Christmas of 1860, John returns to Pennsylvania, while John's brothers Matthew, Mark, and Luke join the Confederate Army. John's cousins, Malachy and Jake Hale, join the Union Army. The Hales' youngest child, 16-year-old James, lies about his age to join the Union Army, but contracts dysentery and dies before he sees any action. Caught "betwixt and between", John will not fight for the South, but is unwilling to bear arms against his own brothers. After being reunited with Jonas Steele, who has joined the Union Army as a scout, John becomes a war correspondent for Harper's Weekly. Jonas is commissioned to use his detective skills (being a former Pinkerton detective) to investigate a series of gruesome war crimes. Meanwhile, John travels with the Union Army and witnesses many of the important events of the Civil War, including the First Battle of Bull Run, the Peninsula Campaign, the Siege of Vicksburg, the Battle of the Wilderness (where his brother Mark is killed in front of him), Lee's surrender at Appomattox, and Abraham Lincoln's assassination.

At Bull Run, John meets Kathy Reynolds, the daughter of a senator, who, despite her higher social standing, proves to be a good war nurse. Jonas overcomes his doubts and marries Mary. John's sister, Emma, and her child are caught up in the Siege of Vicksburg, where her husband, Lester, is killed. The Battle of Gettysburg is a prominent focal point of the story; Mary is killed as the battle rages near the Steele home, just as one of Jonas' dreams had predicted. John reconciles with his family as he, his father, and Matthew join a group of Confederate troops in defending the Geyser homestead against a Union Army attack. The Union Army is driven off, but Matthew is killed in the skirmish. Despite being a Union officer, Jonas gains the respect of the Geysers (and possibly a future with Emma) by orchestrating Luke's rescue from a Union POW camp. Jonas finally locates the war crimes assailant, Confederate Major Welles, and kills him. He suffers a serious sword injury to his right arm during the fight resulting in the arm being subsequently amputated. Later, his strange dream of President Lincoln's death arrives too late to save the President at Ford's Theatre. The Hales and the Geysers come together after the war to celebrate John and Kathy's wedding at the Geyser homestead in Virginia.

== Cast ==
- John Hammond as John Geyser
- Stacy Keach as Jonas Steele
- Colleen Dewhurst as Maggie Geyser
- Lloyd Bridges as Ben Geyser
- Kathleen Beller as Kathy Reynolds
- Brian Kerwin as Malachi Hale
- Bruce Abbott as Jacob "Jake" Hale Jr.
- Cooper Huckabee as Matthew Geyser
- Michael Horton as Mark Geyser
- Julia Duffy as Mary Hale Steele
- Penny Peyser as Emma Geyser Bedell
- Warren Oates as Major Welles
- Sterling Hayden as John Brown
- Diane Baker as Evelyn Hale
- Dan Shor as Luke Geyser
- Gregory Peck as Abraham Lincoln
- Paul Winfield as Jonathan Henry
- Robert Vaughn as Senator Reynolds
- Rory Calhoun as General George G. Meade
- Gregg Henry as Lester Bedell
- David W. Harper as James Hale
- Robin Gammell as Jacob Hale Sr.
- Geraldine Page as Mrs. Lovelace
- Rip Torn as General Ulysses S. Grant
- Robert Symonds as General Robert E. Lee
- Gerald S. O'Loughlin as Sergeant O'Toole
- Veronica Redd as Hattie
- John Voldstad as Alvin Mooney
- Gregg Palmer as Bull Run Colonel
- Julius Harris as Swamp Preacher
- Royce D. Applegate as 1st Cell Reporter
- Noble Willingham as Cavalry General On Balloon Field
- Paul Benedict as Mr. Arbuthnot
- William Lucking as Captain Potts
- Charles Napier as Major Harrison
- George Newbern as Private Lawrence "Coward" Jones
- Walter Olkewicz as Private Grundy
- Duncan Regehr as Captain Randolph
- John Vernon as Secretary of State William Seward
- Steve Nevil as Johnny, The Rebel
- Frank Broyles as Abraham Lincoln's Doctor
- Chuck Dovish as Injured Union Soldier

== Production notes ==
Although the series is largely set in Virginia, it was filmed entirely on location in Arkansas, except for the segment representing the Elmira, New York Federal prison camp which was filmed in the stockade at nearby Fort Gibson State Park, Oklahoma.

== Soundtrack ==
Bruce Broughton's entire 2-hour score presented in stereo from the only surviving complete 1/4" two-track master elements was released on limited edition CD limited in 2008 on the Intrada label.

== Home video releases ==
The Blue and the Gray was first released on VHS by RCA/Columbia Pictures Home Video in 1986; it was an abridged 296-minute cut presented over two tapes. A 3-tape set, which marked the first home video release of the original uncut version of the miniseries, was released by Columbia TriStar Home Video in the 1990s. The Region 1 DVD releases became available in 3- and 2-disc sets. The first was released on November 6, 2001, and the second was released by Sony Pictures Home Entertainment on July 26, 2005. The 3-disc edition runs 381 minutes, while the 2-disc edition is a direct transfer of the abridged 296-minute cut.
