= John Hammond (actor) =

American actor

John Hammond (born October 6, 1955) is an American actor. As a virtual unknown he landed the lead role in the 1982 miniseries, The Blue and the Gray as fictional Virginia war-artist John Geyser, then followed it up with lead role in the 1983 family film The Prodigal. He also appeared in five episodes of the TV drama St. Elsewhere in 1984, two episodes of Highway to Heaven, the TV movies Deadly Care in 1987 and Do You Know the Muffin Man in 1989. Hammond also made an appearance in the 1990 movie The Adventures of Ford Fairlane, starring Andrew Dice Clay, and the 1998 horror movie Laughing Dead. Most recently, he starred in the 2017 somber drama Days Till Death, directed by Chia Hao Tat.
