= Zoning (Tangerine Dream album) =

Studio album by Tangerine Dream
- Released: 1996
- Recorded: 1994
- Genres: Electronic, ambient, film score, soundtrack

Tangerine Dream chronology
The Dream Mixes (1995)	Zoning (1996)	Goblins' Club (1996)

Zoning is the fifty-third release and twenty-first soundtrack album by Tangerine Dream.

== Personnel ==
- Edgar Froese - synthesizers, guitar
