= Under Cover – Chapter One =

Under Cover - Chapter One

Studio album by Tangerine Dream
- Released: 2010
- Recorded: 2010
- Genre: Electronic rock
- Length: 76:48
- Label: Eastgate
- Producer: Edgar Froese

Tangerine Dream chronology
Zeitgeist Concert (2010)	Under Cover - Chapter One (2010)	The Endless Season (2010)

Main studio albums chronology
Madcap's Flaming Duty (2007)	Under Cover (2010)	The Island of the Fay (2011)

Under Cover – Chapter One is the 117th release and first and so far only cover album by electronic group Tangerine Dream. It is the group's twenty-eighth major studio album and was released in December 2010. The idea for the album is said to have started in 2008 in Los Angeles. The band was touring in the west coast area at the time, and their promoter jokingly told the band they should cover top 40 hits. It grew into a bet and a full blown concept after careful consideration from the band. Information on the album started to circulate in early autumn, and it was made available for pre-order on the Eastgate Shop website in November. Although appearing on Madcap's Flaming Duty (2007) and appearing on the cover art and performing vocals on this release, vocalist Chris Hausl never became an official member of the group.

== Track listing ==
"Precious" was made available for listening on the band's MySpace page on 16 December 2010. Previews for the whole album were made available on their official download site on 18 December 2010.

No.	Title	Writer(s)	Length
1.	"Cry Little Sister"	Gerard McMahon, Michael Mainieri	5:40
2.	"Everybody Hurts"	R.E.M.	5:06
3.	"Precious"	Depeche Mode	4:20
4.	"Space Oddity"	David Bowie	5:34
5.	"The Model"	Kraftwerk	5:30
6.	"Wicked Game"	Chris Isaak	4:28
7.	"Hotel California"	Don Felder/Glenn Frey/Don Henley	7:39
8.	"Suzanne"	Leonard Cohen	5:23
9.	"Heroes"	David Bowie, Brian Eno	4:35
10.	"Forever Young"	Alphaville	5:40
11.	"Iris"	Goo Goo Dolls	4:08
12.	"Norwegian Wood (This Bird Has Flown)"	Lennon/McCartney	5:33
13.	"Hallelujah"	Leonard Cohen	6:19
14.	"Wish You Were Here"	David Gilmour/Roger Waters	6:53

== Personnel ==
Tangerine Dream

- Edgar Froese – composer, musician, backing vocals
- Bernhard Beibl – musician
- Iris Camaa – musician
- Thorsten Quaeschning – composer, musician, vocalist
- Linda Spa – musician, backing vocals

Additional musicians

- Chris Hausl – vocals
