= Mota Atma =

- 2003 LP album cover

Soundtrack album by Tangerine Dream
- Recorded: 2003
- Studios: Pinnacle Studios, London
- Genres: Electronic; ambient
- Length: 71:01
- Label: TDI International

Professional ratings
Review scores
| Source | Rating |
|---|---|
| AllMusic | 3/5 stars |

Mota Atma (2003) is the seventy-fifth release and twenty-seventh soundtrack album by German electronic music group Tangerine Dream.

The album was the soundtrack to the documentary Mota Atma and features the father and son lineup of the band, Edgar and Jerome Froese.

== Track listing ==
| No. | Title | Length |
|---|---|---|
| 1. | "The Courage to Lose" | 8:03 |
| 2. | "For the Summit Only" | 7:57 |
| 3. | "No Pleasure No Pain" | 5:52 |
| 4. | "Royal Way of Privacy" | 8:38 |
| 5. | "Phoenix Burning" | 7:35 |
| 6. | "Prophet in Chains" | 7:43 |
| 7. | "Snow on Angels Feathers" | 5:34 |
| 8. | "A Fair Days Wage" | 8:09 |
| 9. | "Brain Offender" | 5:53 |
| 10. | "A Day in Liberty Valley" | 5:37 |
| Total length: | | 71:01 |
