= The Island of the Fay =

Studio album by Tangerine Dream
- Released: March 2011
- Recorded: early 2011
- Genre: Electronic
- Length: 67:52
- Label: Eastgate
- Producer: Edgar Froese

Tangerine Dream chronology
Booster IV (2011)	The Island of the Fay (2011)	The Gate of Saturn (2011)

Main studio albums chronology
Under Cover (2010)	The Island of the Fay (2011)	The Angel of the West Window (2011)

The Island of the Fay is the 120th release and twenty-ninth main studio album by the electronic group Tangerine Dream. It was first revealed in late February 2011, and was released on March 18. A preview of "Fay bewitching the Moon" was released to the members who were part of the Tangerine Dream Online Club (TDOC). This is the first release to feature violinist Hoshiko Yamane as a band member. This album marks the beginning of the band's new "Sonic Poems" series.

== Track listing ==
No.	Title	Length
1.	"Marmontel Riding on a Clef"	7:47
2.	"Breath Kissing Matter’s Mouth"	8:59
3.	"Beauty of Magic Antagonism"	5:59
4.	"Fay Bewitching the Moon"	11:01
5.	"Cycle of Eternity"	6:46
6.	"Death in the Shadow"	9:08
7.	"Moment of Floating Into the Light"	9:28
8.	"Darkness Veiling the Night"	8:44

== Personnel ==
Tangerine Dream

- Edgar Froese
- Thorsten Quaeschning
- Linda Spa
- Iris Camaa
- Bernhard Beibl
- Hoshiko Yamane
