= Das Mädchen auf der Treppe =

Soundtrack album by Tangerine Dream
- Released: 1982
- Recorded: 1982
- Genre: Electronic
- Length: 6:51 or 11:56
- Label: Virgin

Tangerine Dream chronology
White Eagle (1982)	Das Mädchen auf der Treppe (1982)	Logos Live (1982)

Das Mädchen auf der Treppe (1982) (German: The Girl on the Steps) is a soundtrack single by the German band Tangerine Dream for an episode of the TV series Tatort.

The title track is a remix of "White Eagle". Tracks 1 and 3 were released on the 7" single version and all tracks were released on the 12" single. The 12" single mistakenly shows 33 RPM on the vinyl label, thus some bootlegs included these tracks at the wrong speed. Some of the tracks have been re-released in a re-mixed format, but the originals are only available on vinyl.

== Track listing ==
No.	Title	Length
1.	"Das Mädchen auf der Treppe"	3:50
2.	"Flock"	2:28
3.	"Katja"	3:01
4.	"Speed"	2:37

== Personnel ==
- Edgar Froese
- Christopher Franke
- Johannes Schmoelling
