= Turn of the Tides =

Studio album by Tangerine Dream
- Released: 1994
- Recorded: 1993–1994
- Genres: New-age, electronic
- Length: 56:44
- Label: Miramar
- Producer: Edgar Froese

Tangerine Dream chronology
220 Volt Live (1993)	Turn of the Tides (1994)	Catch Me If You Can (1994)

Professional ratings
Review scores
Source	Rating
AllMusic	4/5 stars

Turn of the Tides is the forty-ninth release and twenty-second major studio album by the band Tangerine Dream. It is the first studio album to feature saxophone player Linda Spa and guitarist Zlatko Perica performing as full-time members. It was nominated for Best New Age Album at the 1995 Grammys.

The group would slowly become less well known to general audiences following this album until the release of Quantum Gate in 2017 which revitalized interest in the group. This is the only studio album to feature guitarist Zlatko Perica as an official member of the group.

== Background ==
Furthering the development of their music, Tangerine Dream continued the musical approach that they had presented on their previous Miramar releases. Besides electronic equipment, TD was using guitar, saxophone and backing vocals once again. But their sound also seemed to be broader, which was shown in the flamenco guitar stylized Firetongues, the use of acoustic guitar in Twilight Brigade and other tracks that seemed to form a more atmospheric sound. According to the inside booklet of the CD, like a concept album, these tracks are based on a short story written by Edgar Froese. It explains that the story is taken from a book called The Coachman's Tales, although it would appear there is no such book with that title. Jayney Klimek, who made an appearance on Dreamtime, provided vocals for the track Galley Slave's Horizon. The opening track is a reworked Modest Mussorgsky piece, Pictures at an Exhibition. The re-released version of the album had a bonus track called Story of the Brave, which had originated on the promo disc for the album.

This album was re-issued on the band's TDI label in 1996 and 1999, then again on Membran in 2009.

== Track listing ==
No.	Title	Writer(s)	Length
1.	"Pictures at an Exhibition"	Modest Mussorgsky	3:01
2.	"Firetongues"	Jerome Froese	6:32
3.	"Galley Slave's Horizon"	Jerome Froese	7:47
4.	"Death of a Nightingale"	Edgar Froese	5:30
5.	"Twilight Brigade"	Jerome Froese	9:45
6.	"Jungle Journey"	Jerome Froese	6:34
7.	"Midwinter Night"	Edgar Froese	4:38
8.	"Turn of the Tides"	Edgar Froese	7:40
9.	"Story of the Brave (re-release bonus track)"	Edgar Froese, Linda Spa	5:17

== Personnel ==
Tangerine Dream

- Edgar Froese – guitar, keyboards, drums
- Jerome Froese – guitar, keyboards, drums
- Linda Spa – saxophone, keyboards.
- Zlatko Perica – guitar

Additional personnel

- Jayney Klimek – vocals
- Julie Ocean – vocals
- Vienna Horn Ensemble
- Roland Braunstein – engineer
