= The Dream Mixes =

Remix album by Tangerine Dream
- Released: 1995, 1997
- Recorded: April 1995
- Length: 67:11
- Label: Miramar
- Producer: Edgar Froese

Tangerine Dream chronology
Tyranny of Beauty (1995)	The Dream Mixes (1995)	Zoning (1996)

Professional ratings
Review scores
Source	Rating
AllMusic	2.5/5 stars

The Dream Mixes is the first remix album by Tangerine Dream and their twenty-fifth overall. The album is a collection of extant Tangerine Dream songs remixed with a dance beat by Jerome Froese and is the first in a series that includes TimeSquare – Dream Mixes II (1997), DM3 – The Past Hundred Moons (2001), DM 4 (2003), DM 2.1 (2007), and DM V (2010). In 1996, the album was re-released as a two-CD set that included six new songs. This set was released again in 1998 as Dream Mixes One.

== Track listing ==
No.	Title	Length
1.	"Little Blond in the Parc of Attractions (Thai Dub)"	7:17
2.	"Rough Embrace"	5:30
3.	"Touchwood (Forest Mix)"	7:00
4.	"Jungle Journey (Reptile Mix)"	6:20
5.	"Virtually Fields"	6:50
6.	"Firetongues (Break Freak Mix)"	6:18
7.	"San Rocco"	7:17
8.	"Catwalk (Dress-up Mix)"	7:49
9.	"Change of the Gods"	7:19
10.	"Bride in Cold Tears (Motown Monk Mix)"	5:31

Bonus Tracks from The Club Dream Mixes

No.	Title	Length
11.	"Touchwood (Radio Edit)"	4:05
12.	"Little Blond in the Park of Attractions (Radio Edit)"	4:05
13.	"Catwalk (Black Ink Mix)"	4:12
14.	"Touchwood (Poison Byte Mix)"	8:15
15.	"Iowa"	7:12
16.	"Sojus"	9:21
