= Madcap's Flaming Duty =

Studio album by Tangerine Dream
- Released: April 2007
- Recorded: October 2006
- Genres: Electronic, ambient, new-age
- Length: 73:43
- Label: Eastgate
- Producer: Edgar Froese

Tangerine Dream chronology
| Springtime in Nagasaki (2007) | Madcap's Flaming Duty (2007) | Summer in Nagasaki (2007) |

Main studio albums chronology
| Jeanne d'Arc (2005) | Madcap's Flaming Duty (2007) | Under Cover (2010) |

Professional ratings
Review scores
| Source | Rating |
|---|---|
| AllMusic | (not rated) |
| PopMatters | positive |
| Sputnikmusic | 4/5 |

Madcap's Flaming Duty is the ninety-eighth release and twenty-seventh major studio album by Tangerine Dream. Along with Cyclone (1978) and Tyger (1987) it is one of the few Tangerine Dream releases to feature vocals. The album is a tribute to Syd Barrett who died in 2006; the title references Barrett's album The Madcap Laughs. This is the first album to feature Bernhard Beibl who would remain a member until 2014.

== Track listing ==
| No. | Title | Writer(s) | Length |
|---|---|---|---|
| 1. | "Astrophel and Stella" (16th century English poetry) | Music by Froese Froese, Lyrics by Sir Philip Sidney | 7:21 |
| 2. | "Shape My Sin" | Music by Thorsten Quaeschning, Lyrics by Christian Torsa | 4:50 |
| 3. | "The Blessed Damozel" | Music by Thorsten Quaeschning, Lyrics by Dante G. Rossetti | 5:16 |
| 4. | "Divorce" | Music by Edgar Froese, Lyrics by Thomas Stanley | 4:46 |
| 5. | "Dream of Death" | Music by Thorsten Quaeschning, Lyrics by Edmund C. Stedman | 7:46 |
| 6. | "Hear the Voice" | Music by Edgar Froese, Lyrics by William Blake | 5:08 |
| 7. | "Lake of Pontchartrain" (Traditional Irish) | Music and Lyrics 'Irish Traditional', Arranged by Edgar Froese and Thorsten Quaeschning | 7:23 |
| 8. | "Mad Song" | Music by Edgar Froese, Lyrics by William Blake | 5:08 |
| 9. | "One Hour of Madness" | Music by Thorsten Quaeschning, Lyrics by Walt Whitman | 8:29 |
| 10. | "Man" | Music by Edgar Froese, Lyrics by George Herbert | 4:47 |
| 11. | "Hymn to Intellectual Beauty" | Music by Thorsten Quaeschning, Lyrics by Percy B. Shelley | 6:24 |
| 12. | "Solution to All Problems" | Music by Edgar Froese, Lyrics by Ralph Waldo Emerson | 6:24 |
| 13. | "The Burning Babe's Reality Song" (bonus track) | Music by Edgar Froese, Lyrics by Robert Southwell | 5:33 |

== Personnel ==
Tangerine Dream

- Edgar Froese – keyboards, guitars, drum programming, harmonica
- Thorsten Quaeschning – keyboards, drum programming, vocals
- Linda Spa – flute
- Iris Camaa – percussion
- Bernhard Beibl – guitars, violin, mandolin

Additional musicians

- Chris Hausl – vocals
- Gynt Beator – Irish bouzouki
- Thomas Beator – Irish bouzouki
