= Phaedrus =

Phaedrus may refer to:

== People ==
- Phaedrus (Athenian) (c. 444 BC – 393 BC), an Athenian aristocrat depicted in Plato's dialogues
- Phaedrus (fabulist) (c. 15 BC – c. AD 50), a Roman fabulist
- Phaedrus the Epicurean (138 BC – c. 70 BC), an Epicurean philosopher

== Art and literature ==
- Phaedrus (dialogue), a dialogue of Plato
- Phaedrus (play), a 3rd-century BCE comedic play by Alexis (poet)
- Phaedrus, a character in Zen and the Art of Motorcycle Maintenance
- A work by Cy Twombly
- Phaedrus, Johnathan, a character in the Reckoners novels by Brandon Sanderson.

== See also ==
- Phaedra (disambiguation)
