= Goblins' Club =

Goblin's Club

Studio album by Tangerine Dream
- Released: September 1996
- Recorded: May – July 1996
- Length: 59:19
- Label: Sequel Records
- Producer: Edgar Froese

Tangerine Dream chronology
Zoning (1995)	Goblin's Club (1996)	Tournado (1997)

Main studio albums chronology
Tyranny of Beauty (1995)	Goblins' Club (1996)	Mars Polaris (1999)

Goblins' Club is the fifty-fourth release and twenty-fourth main studio album by Tangerine Dream. Although sonically a counterweight to The Dream Mixes, it is usually considered the first album in the Millennium/TDI Years era due to the switch from Miramar, despite TDI not yet being the band's label. An Australian version lacked the track "Elf June and the Midnight Patrol", co-written by Linda Spa, replacing it with "Fort Worth Runway One" by Edgar Froese. A 2004 re-release included both, but edited the final two tracks to fit on the disc. Goblins' Club marks the final appearance of Linda Spa as a regular group member until returning for Jeanne d'Arc (2005).

== Track listing ==
No.	Title	Writer(s)	Length
1.	"Towards the Evening Star"	Jerome Froese	6:16
2.	"At Darwin's Motel"	Edgar Froese	7:22
3.	"On Cranes' Passage"	Jerome Froese	4:28
4.	"Rising Haul in Silence"	Jerome Froese	7:33
5.	"United Goblins' Parade"	Edgar Froese	5:44
6.	"Lamb With Radar Eyes"	Jerome Froese	8:39
7.	"Elf June and the Midnight Patrol"	Edgar Froese, Linda Spa	4:40
8.	"Sad Merlin's Sunday"	Edgar Froese	10:50
9.	"Fort Worth Runway One" (alternate version track)	Edgar Froese	6:42

== Personnel ==
Tangerine Dream

- Edgar Froese
- Jerome Froese
- Linda Spa

Guest musicians

- Gerald Gradwohl
- Mark Hornby

== Single ==
"Towards the Evening Star" was released as a promo CD.

No.	Title	Length
1.	"Towards The Evening Star"	3:36

== Remix ==
"Towards the Evening Star" was released in 1997 as a two track CD with a remix by The Orb.

No.	Title	Writer(s)	Length
1.	"Towards the Evening Star" (Mandarin Cream Remix)	The Orb	8:31
2.	"Towards the Evening Star"		6:16
