= Deadly Care =

1987 television film directed by David Anspaugh

- Genre: Drama
- Written by: Lane Slate
- Directed by: David Anspaugh
- Starring: Cheryl Ladd; Jason Miller; Jennifer Salt; Belinda Balaski; Richard Evans; Silvana Gallardo
- Music by: Tangerine Dream
- Country of origin: United States
- Original language: English

Production
- Executive producers: Joe Epstein; Wendy Riche; Paula Rudnick
- Producer: Medora Heilbron
- Cinematography: James Crabe
- Editor: Jane Schwartz Jaffe
- Running time: 96 minutes
- Production company: Universal Television

Original release
- Network: CBS
- Release: March 22, 1987

Deadly Care is a 1987 American made for television drama film starring Cheryl Ladd and Jason Miller.

Deadly Care was director David Anspaugh's last television film before directing the Academy Award-nominated film Hoosiers.

The film featured an original score by the band Tangerine Dream.

== Plot ==
A critical care nurse abuses drugs and alcohol, causing her to make a near-fatal mistake in treating a patient.

== Cast ==
- Cheryl Ladd as Anne Halloran
- Jason Miller as Dr. Miles Keefer
- Jennifer Salt as Carol
- Belinda Balaski as Terry
- Richard Evans as Jim
- Silvana Gallardo as Blanca Orella
- Ann Hearn as Suze
- Peggy McCay as Mrs. Halloran
- Terrence E. McNally as Frank Halloran
- Chris Mulkey as Richard Halloran
- Laurie O'Brien as Gloria
- Willard Pugh as Male Nurse
- John Hammond as Larry
- Arthur Taxier as Dr. Davidson
- Patricia Wilson as Marsha Foland
- Micole Mercurio as Greta
- Patrick Campbell as Mr. Skinner
- Troy Melton as Mr. Duffy
- Beth Grant as Madge
- Troy Evans as Dr. Derwin
- S. A. Griffin as The Stranger
- Paddi Edwards as Mrs. Kellerman
- Scott Richard Ehredt as Dr. Jackson
- Frank Biro as Mr. Cafarelli
- Phyllis Flax as Mrs. Reardon
- Ron Recasner as Dr. Mallory
- Patricia Huston as Marsha Foland
- John Christy Ewing as Dr. Lloyd Lucas
- John Howard Swain as Joel
- Gerry Gibson as Farther O'Brien
- Noel De Souza as Dr. Wasanta
- Joe Dorsey as Mr. Halloran
- Suzanne O'Donnell as Stewardess
- Judy Jean Berns as Airport Clerk
- Daryl Wood as Woman in Elevator

== Reception ==
The Sun-Sentinel wrote "Deadly Care may be remembered as a career footnote: as director David Anspaugh's last TV movie before making the Oscar-nominated feature Hoosiers."
