= Gerald Gradwohl =

Austrian guitarist (born 1967)

Gerald Gradwohl (born 15 April 1967) is an Austrian guitarist who made guest appearances (studio and live) with Tangerine Dream at various points from 1995 to 2007. He attended the J.M. Hauer Music School in Vienna studying classical guitar and jazz guitar and received a diploma in 1989 after only two and a half years. Gradwohl has released two solo CDs in Europe entitled ABQ and Tritone Barrier. He has also been a bandleader for European bands Threeo, Cats & Camel and The Powergrade as well as Harald Winkum.
