= TimeSquare – Dream Mixes II =

Remix album by Tangerine Dream
- Released: 1997
- Recorded: 1997
- Length: 57:37
- Label: TDI Music
- Producer: Edgar Froese

Tangerine Dream chronology
Tournado (1997)	TimeSquare – Dream Mixes II (1997)	The Keep (1997)

Professional ratings
Review scores
Source	Rating
AllMusic	3/5 stars

TimeSquare – Dream Mixes II is the fifty-seventh release by Tangerine Dream and the second of their Dream Mixes albums on their own label after The Dream Mixes (1995). The album, as well as reworkings of past tracks, includes a remix of a track from Dream Mixes One. Further releases in this series were DM3 - The Past Hundred Moons (2001), DM 4 (2003) and DM V (2010). The album was reissued as TD - DM 2:1 (2007), a mix of tracks from this album and Dream Mixes One.

== Track listing ==
All tracks are written by Edgar Froese and Jerome Froese.

No.	Title	Length
1.	"Mobocaster"	7:24
2.	"Jungle Jacula"	8:41
3.	"Towards The Evening Star (Blue Gravity Mix)"	8:39
4.	"Digital Sister"	7:10
5.	"Pixel Pirates"	6:53
6.	"Culpa Levis"	10.08
7.	"Timesquare"	8:42
