= Patricia Wilson =

British writer (1929–2010)

Patricia Grace Wilson
- Born: 17 December 1929; Yorkshire, England
- Died: 2010 (aged 80–81); Yorkshire, England
- Occupation: Novelist
- Writing career
- Pen name: Patricia Wilson
- Period: 1986–2004
- Genre: Romantic novel

Patricia Grace Wilson (17 December 1929 – 2010) was a British writer of 53 romance novels for the Mills & Boon publisher from 1986 to 2004. She placed her novels primarily in England, Spain or France.

Wilson died in Yorkshire in 2010.

== Bibliography ==
=== Single novels ===
- The Final Price (1986)
- Bride of Diaz (1986)
- A Growing Suspicion (1986)
- A Lingering Melody (1987)
- Moment of Anger (1987)
- Ortiga Marriage (1987)
- Impossible Bargain (1987)
- A Certain Affection (1988)
- Beloved Intruder (1988)
- When the Gods Choose (1988)
- Temporary Bride (1988)
- Gathering Darkness (1988)
- Guardian Angel (1989)
- The Dangerous Obsession (1989)
- A Secret Understanding (1989)
- Bond of Destiny (1989)
- Stormy Surrender (1990)
- Passionate Enemy (1990)
- Curtain of Stars (1990)
- Perilous Refuge (1991)
- The Gift of Loving (1991)
- Intangible Dream (1992)
- Out of Nowhere (1992)
- Dearest Traitor (1992)
- Walk Upon the Wind (1992)
- Dark Illusion (1992)
- Reckless Crusade (1992)
- Passionate Captivity (1993)
- Powerful Stranger (1993)
- Relentless Flame (1994)
- Edge of Danger (1994)
- Sense of Destiny (1994)
- Burden of Innocence (1994)
- Tender Deceit (1995)
- Never a Stranger (1995)
- An Innocent Charade (1996)
- Borrowed Wife (1996)
- Macbride's Daughter (1997)
- A Dark and Dangerous Man (1997)
- Black Velvet (1997)
- Courting Trouble (1997)
- A Darker Shadow (1998)
- To the Lake City (1999)
- Fire Storm (2001)
- Crescendo (2001)
- West of the Moon (2002)
- His Unexpected Proposal (2002)

=== Forsythe Enchantment Saga ===
- Forbidden Enchantment (1991)
- Jungle Enchantment (1991)

=== Euromance or Postcards from Europe Series multi-author ===
- Dark Sunlight (1993)
- A Healing Fire (1993)

=== Hitched! Series multi-author ===
- A Dangerous Magic (1993)

=== Today's Woman Series multi-author ===
- Coming Home (1996)
