= Logos Live =

Live album by Tangerine Dream
- Released: December 1982
- Recorded: 6 November 1982
- Venues: Dominion Theatre, London, England
- Genre: Electronic
- Length: 50:55
- Label: Virgin

Tangerine Dream chronology
Das Mädchen auf der Treppe (1982)	Logos Live (1982)	Daydream – Moorland (1983)

Professional ratings
Review scores
Source	Rating
AllMusic	2.5/5 stars

Logos Live is the eighteenth major release and fourth live album by Tangerine Dream. It was released in December 1982. It is a live album from the concert at the Dominion Theatre in London, England. Much like Tangram with short movements connected by atmospheric segues, Logos captured a period of Tangerine Dream's evolution from experimental to melodic, documented also by their soundtrack to the motion picture Risky Business a year later.

From the two-hour concert, 50 minutes of music original to the concert was included on the album. The entire concert was officially released in full, along with Logos Live, on the Pilots of Purple Twilight: The Virgin Recordings 1980–83 box set in 2020. Before the official release, the full concert could be found on the Tangerine Tree release Tangerine Leaves Volume 1: London 1982. The same concert was played at Fairfield Halls in Croydon on 31 October 1982 and released as Tangerine Tree Volume 12: Croydon 1982.

Segments from the Dominion concert, including parts of the Logos Live album, were used as musical score for the 1983 film The Keep, though the eventual soundtrack that was released for the film only included segments from the concert that were not on Logos Live.

== Track listing ==
Side one
No.	Title	Length
1.	"Logos, Part One"	25:41

Side two
No.	Title	Length
1.	"Logos, Part Two"	19:28
2.	"Dominion"	5:45

The releases of Logos Live do not split parts one and two, but these thematic sections have been remixed or re-recorded and used in other albums as separate tracks. Some CD releases combine parts one and two into a single track.

"Logos, Part One"
No.	Title	Length
1.	"Logos Intro"	4:32
2.	"Logos Cyan"	2:29
3.	"Logos Velvet"	4:49
4.	"Logos Red"	8:26
5.	"Logos Blue"	5:14

"Logos, Part Two"
No.	Title	Length
1.	"Logos Black"	5:05
2.	"Logos Green"	4:36
3.	"Logos Yellow"	7:05
4.	"Logos Coda"	2:33

== Personnel ==
- Edgar Froese
- Christopher Franke
- Johannes Schmoelling
