= Lily on the Beach =

- 1989 LP album cover

Studio album by Tangerine Dream
- Released: 17 October 1989
- Recorded: July–August 1989, in Vienna and Berlin
- Genre: Electronic
- Length: 55:59
- Label: Private Music
- Producers: Edgar Froese; Paul Haslinger

Tangerine Dream chronology
Miracle Mile (1989)	Lily on the Beach (1989)	Destination Berlin (1990)

Professional ratings
Review scores
Source	Rating
AllMusic	3/5 stars

Lily on the Beach is the thirty-seventh major release and nineteenth studio album by Tangerine Dream. The track "Radio City" was the first appearance of future TD member Jerome Froese, son of founding member Edgar Froese, while the track "Long Island Sunset" was the first time the saxophone was used in a TD track.

== Track listing ==
All tracks are written by Edgar Froese and Paul Haslinger.

No.	Title	Length
1.	"Too Hot for My Chinchilla"	3:51
2.	"Lily on the Beach"	4:16
3.	"Alaskan Summer"	3:33
4.	"Desert Drive"	3:47
5.	"Mount Shasta"	4:26
6.	"Crystal Curfew"	4:57
7.	"Paradise Cove"	3:45
8.	"Twenty-Nine Palms"	3:19
9.	"Valley of the Kings"	5:05
10.	"Radio City"	4:04
11.	"Blue Mango Cafe"	4:12
12.	"Gecko"	3:33
13.	"Long Island Sunset"	7:11

== Personnel ==
- Edgar Froese – keyboards, lead guitars, drums
- Paul Haslinger – keyboards, rhythm guitars, Chapman Stick, drums
- Jerome Froese – lead guitar on "Radio City"
- Hubert Waldner – soprano sax and flute on "Long Island Sunset"
- Norman Moore – cover art and design
- Ian Logan – cover photograph
- Monica Froese – photo concept
