= Optical Race =

- 1988 LP album cover

Studio album by Tangerine Dream
- Released: August 1988
- Recorded: April–May, 1988, in Berlin and Vienna
- Genre: Electronic
- Length: 52:39
- Label: Private Music
- Producers: Paul Haslinger; Edgar Froese

Tangerine Dream chronology
Livemiles (1988)	Optical Race (1988)	Miracle Mile (1989)

Professional ratings
Review scores
Source	Rating
AllMusic	3/5 stars

Optical Race is the thirty-fifth major release and eighteenth studio album by Tangerine Dream. Optical Race is the inaugural album of the Melrose Years era, as it is the first appearance of the band on the Private Music label, founded by former Tangerine Dream member Peter Baumann. It was their first album without Christopher Franke since 1970's Electronic Meditation and the band's first to be programmed largely with a computer, an Atari ST using Steinberg/Jones software. The sleeve of the 12" release and the first release on CD and Compact Cassette features a die-cut outer sleeve with a multicolored inner sleeve.

"Atlas Eyes" is in 5/4 time. "Mothers of Rain" first appeared two years before the album's release, during the band's 1986 European tour. "Turning Off The Wheel" was re-released on the Transsiberia album in 1998 under the title "The Golden Horn". "Sun Gate" was played by the group on German TV show Wetten, dass..? (moderated by Thomas Gottschalk) in 1988.

== Track listing ==
No.	Title	Length
1.	"Marakesh"	8:17
2.	"Atlas Eyes"	4:04
3.	"Mothers of Rain"	5:13
4.	"Twin Soul Tribe"	4:28
5.	"Optical Race"	3:13
6.	"Cat Scan"	5:35
7.	"Sun Gate"	4:44
8.	"Turning Off the Wheel"	6:11
9.	"The Midnight Trail"	5:54
10.	"Ghazal (Love Song)"	5:00

== Personnel ==
- Paul Haslinger – composer, musician
- Edgar Froese – composer, musician
- Ralf Wadephul – composer
- Christian Gstettner – studio technician
- Monica Froese – cover concept
- Norman Moore – art direction and design
