= Phaedra 2005 =

Studio album by Tangerine Dream
- Released: 2005
- Recorded: 2005
- Genre: Electronic
- Length: 38:13
- Label: Eastgate Music
- Producer: Edgar Froese

Tangerine Dream chronology
Rocking Mars (2005)	Phaedra 2005 (2005)	Blue Dawn (2006)

Phaedra 2005 is the ninety-first release by Tangerine Dream. It is a re-recording of their 1974 album Phaedra.

== Track listing ==
No.	Title	Length
1.	"Phaedra"	11:10
2.	"Mysterious Semblance at the Strand of Nightmares"	9:53
3.	"Movements of a Visionary"	7:58
4.	"Sequent C'"	3:05
5.	"Delfi"	6:07

== Personnel ==
- Edgar Froese— composer, musician, producer
- Thorsten Quaeschning— musician (flute) on Sequent C

Additional personnel

- Peter Baumann— composer
- Christopher Franke— composer
