= Linda Spa =

Austrian composer (born 1968)

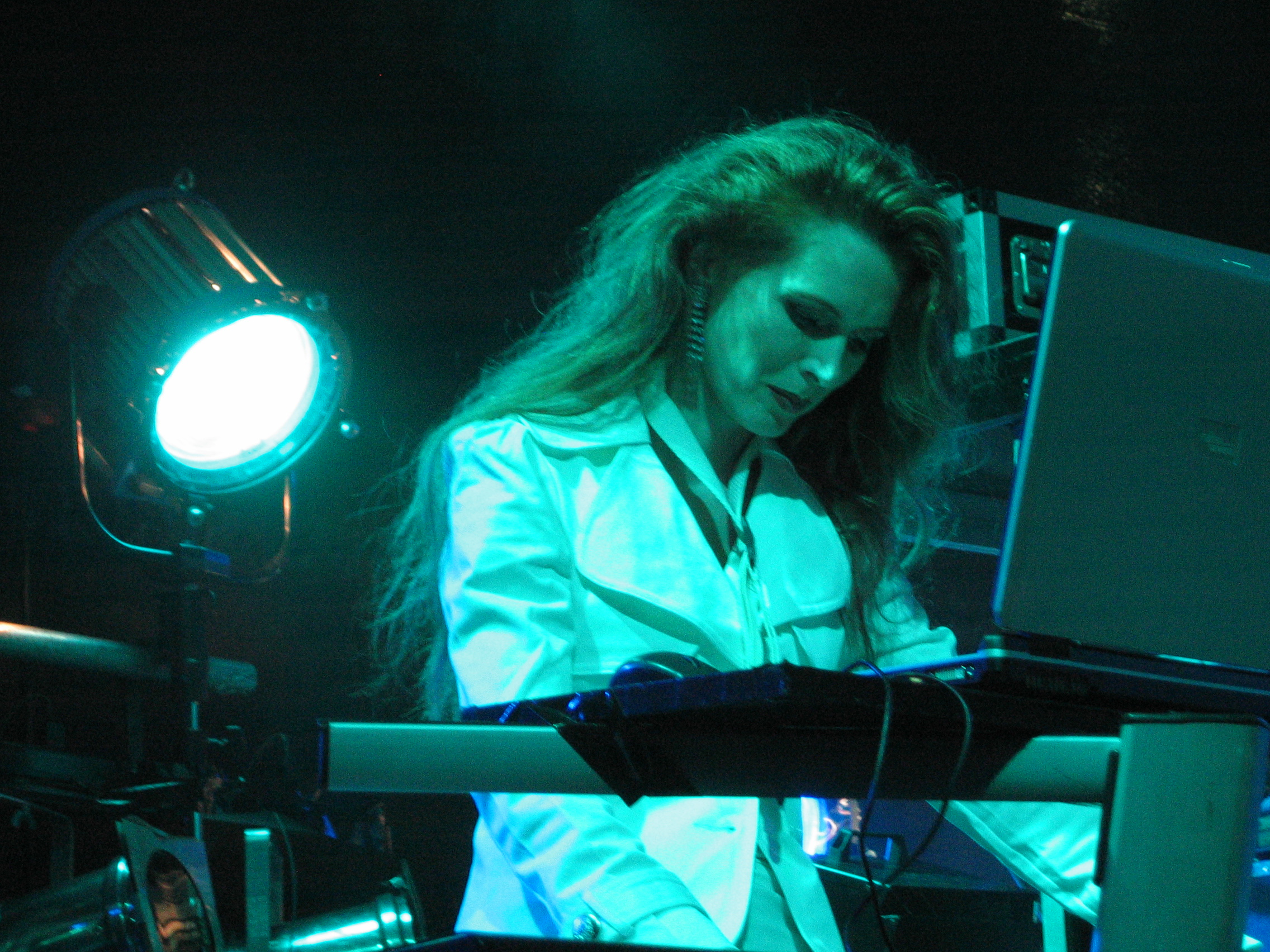
Linda Spa

Linda Spa (a.k.a. Mag. Gerlinde Spazierer, born 4 September 1968, in Vienna) is an Austrian composer.

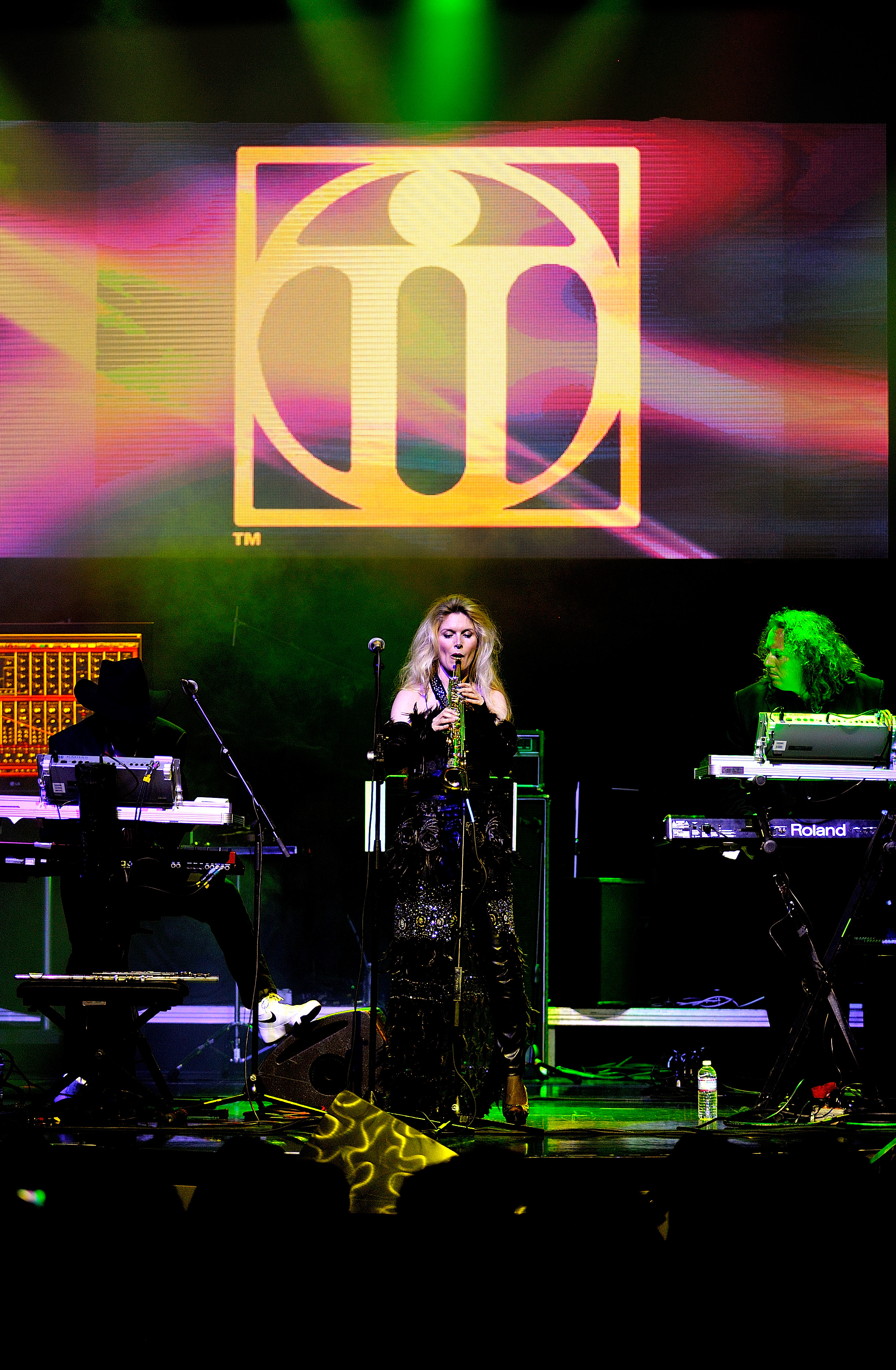
Linda Spa, Tangerine Dream, Cruise to the Edge 2014

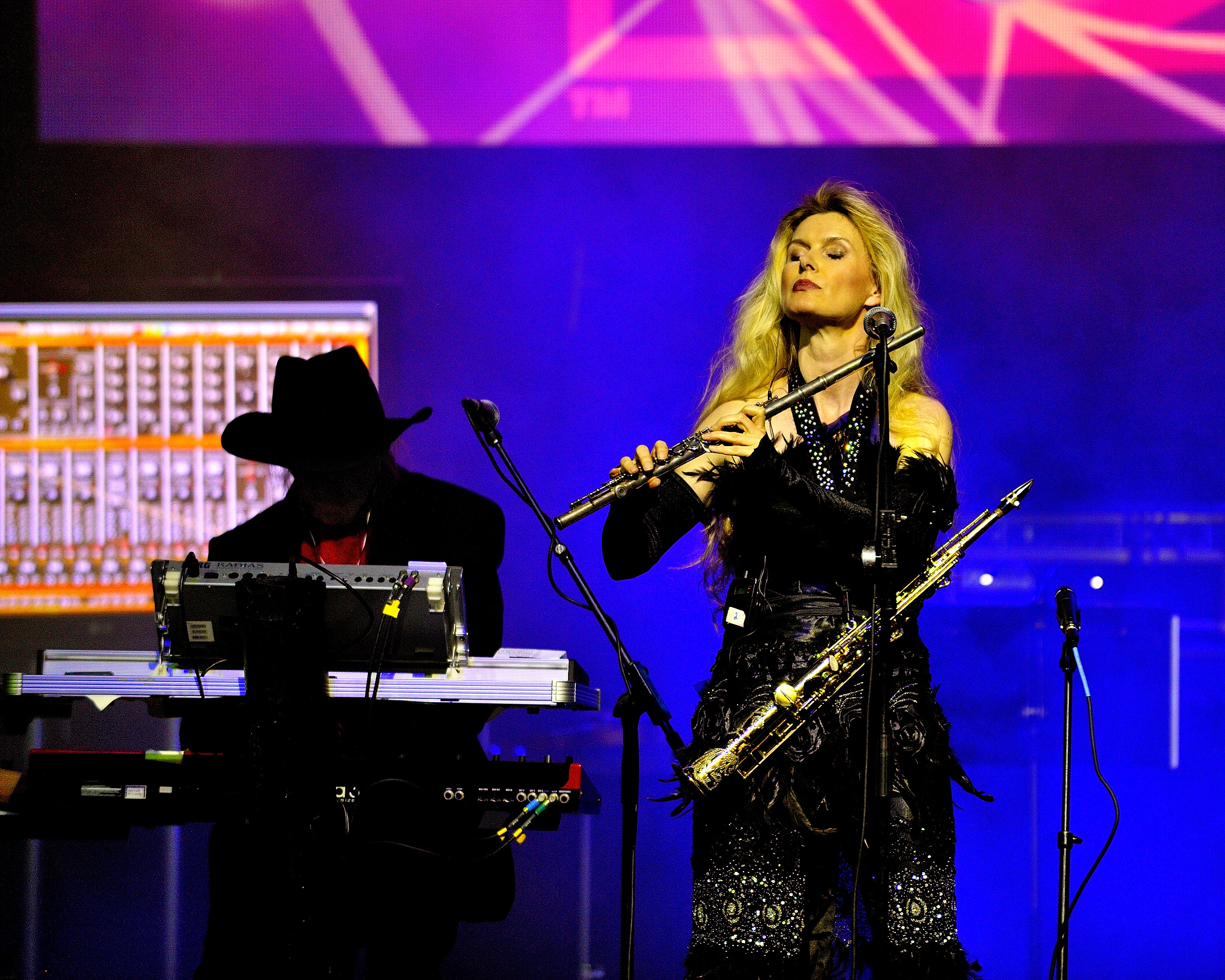
Linda Spa, Tangerine Dream, Cruise to the Edge 2014

Originally she learned fashion design in Vienna, but soon started with her musical training. She studied flute, clarinet, saxophone and composition. In addition, Linda Spa is a trained conductor and arranger.

In addition to many international artistic works, especially for theater and film music scores, actually in Austria in the field of stage- and acting music, she played for many years with Edgar Froese's band Tangerine Dream as saxophonist, keyboardist and conductor. She also composed for this ensemble, and also toured occasionally with the band in Europe and overseas till 2015.

Linda Spa was Grammy-nominated five times as a leading member of the band Tangerine Dream in the 1990s. She performed live the song Sally's Garden 2011 together with Queen guitar player Brian May as a duet on stage.

For some time, Linda Spa has been working with various guest musicians on the completion of her new CD with love songs composed by her.

== Discography ==
=== with Tangerine Dream ===
Major albums

- 1992: 220 Volt Live (Live)
- 1994: Turn of the Tides
- 1995: Tyranny of Beauty
- 1996: Goblins' Club
- 2005: Jeanne d'Arc
- 2007: Madcap's Flaming Duty
- 2010: Under Cover
- 2011: The Island of the Fay
