= Ralf Wadephul =

- Born: 8 May 1958 (age 67); Berlin, Germany
- Genres: Synthpop
- Instrument: Keyboards
- Formerly of: Tangerine Dream

Ralf Wadephul, born 1958 in Berlin, is a German keyboardist/composer who collaborated with Tangerine Dream (Edgar Froese, Paul Haslinger) in the late 1980s on their first "Melrose Years" album Optical Race (1988). While all the material on this album was composed by Froese and Haslinger prior to him joining the band, Wadephul did contribute the track "Sun Gate", a romantic ballad type number that features an Edgar Froese guitar solo. He also performed with the band on their North American tour later that year. Ralf left the band shortly afterwards following the birth of his son Julian Wadephul. The 2006 Tangerine Dream release "Blue Dawn" consists of material composed by Froese and Wadephul during that same tour in 1988, albeit of a studio nature. Ralf continues to keep busy as a musician and sound engineer to this day.

In April 2008, he released his first ever solo album entitled "When Aliens Meet a Drop of Water" on the German Manikin Records label.
