= Jerome Froese =

German musician

- Also known as: TDJ Rome
- Born: 24 November 1970 (age 55); West Berlin, West Germany
- Genres: Electronica; ambient
- Labels: TDI; Ground Liftaz; Moonpop; Cargo Records; Darla Records
- Website: jeromefroese.com

Jerome Froese (born 24 November 1970 in Schöneberg, West Berlin, West Germany) is a German musician who, in 1990, officially joined his father Edgar Froese in the band Tangerine Dream. He remained a member until 2006. Prior to his direct involvement in Tangerine Dream, Froese often appeared on the covers of the band's albums as a child, beginning with the 1973 release of Atem, when he was two years four months old at the time the album was released.

== Career ==
In 1982, Froese started playing guitar and keyboard. A few years later, in 1985, he began playing drums after he got a drumkit for Christmas. From here, Froese became proficient on both keyboards and guitar, leading up to his induction into Tangerine Dream. Froese's first guest appearance with the band was on their 1989 album, Lily on the Beach, playing guitar on "Radio City". His first official appearance was on Melrose (1990), appearing on tour with the band that same year.

Following the departure of Paul Haslinger, Tangerine Dream continued as a two-piece father-and-son band with various musicians guesting in the studio and in concert. The band stated on the record that their musical relationship was kept entirely separate from their family relationship, as witnessed by visitors to their studio seeing the two argue over a few notes. During these years, Jerome became increasingly interested in experimental styles of electronica and dance music.

The fourth album in the Dream Mixes series, released in late 2003, had been created without any participation from his father. Jerome had also composed all but one track on each of the other Dream Mixes albums. In 2000, Froese began releasing a series of solo recordings aimed at DJs under the name of TDJ Rome. The three vinyl singles were collected and released together on CD in 2004.

His first solo credit as Jerome Froese came that same year, with the limited edition 1-track single, C8 H10 N4 O2 (named after the chemical formula of caffeine), a track which would later appear on his first full album, Neptunes. In 2005, Froese maintained this parallel solo career with the release of Radio Pluto, an EP that served as a precursor to his first full solo album Neptunes. It was during this time period that he defined the "guitartronica" sound of his solo works.

In 2007, he released another EP, titled Precooked Munchies, which contained two teaser tracks from his upcoming second album, and some exclusive tracks as well. Later that year, his second full-length album Shiver Me Timbers was released, and because of an agreement between father and son, Jerome Froese's Moonpop label obtained the rights of over eighty Tangerine Dream titles, meaning that Jerome's and Edgar's works would be re-released separately. In late 2008, the title track from a new 3-track EP The Speed of Snow was released via the Moonpop website for free.

Early 2009 saw many repackaged collections of Tangerine Dream material released by the Membran label. Two of these collections, Axiat and Vintage Vanguard, were released under the name of Tangerine Dream, though the albums contained only material by Jerome, with the latter including new material recorded at the end of 2008. Froese has also released DM 2.1, featuring selections from the first two Dream Mixes albums and one new track, and on a separate disc, a leftover from DM 4. At the end of 2009, it was announced that, although he had not been an active part of the band since 2006, he had recorded 8 new tracks for a Dream Mixes V, which was released in March 2010.

In August 2010, Froese released a 4-track EP titled Preventive Medicine which featured one track from his forthcoming third studio album, titled Far Side of the Face, which had been tentatively scheduled for release in 2011 but was pushed back. Johannes Schmoelling, another former member of Tangerine Dream, announced on his newsletter that he has collaborated with Froese on two of the new tracks. In June 2011, a Froese live album titled Nightshade Family was released, featuring a full concert set list from the Neptunes tour.

Later in 2011, it was discovered that the collaboration between Froese and Schmoelling would extend beyond the new solo album. Froese's site Moonpop announced the formation of a new band, called Loom, which consisted of Froese, Schmoelling, and also a third member named Robert Waters (Robert Wässer in Germany). The first EP released under the Loom name, 100 001, was released in October, with Froese contributing one new track. At that same time, Froese released the new 2-track mini-EP Einzelkind under his own name. Also in October 2011, Loom performed a concert, playing songs by Froese, Schmoelling, and by Tangerine Dream, from the eras in which those two were members of the band. The full concert was released in February 2012 under the title Scored.

In June 2012, Froese released his third full-length album, Far Side of the Face, as well as a compilation called Cases of Recurrence, which features the EP tracks and rarities from the years 2005-2011.

== Discography ==
=== Albums ===
- Neptunes (2005)
- Shiver Me Timbers (2007)
- Far Side of the Face (2012)
- Orange Sized Dreams (Works 1990–1995) (2015)
- Beginn (with Claudia Brücken) (2018)
- Sunsets in Stereo (2025)

=== Singles ===
==== As Jerome Froese ====
- "C8 H10 N4 O2" (2004)
- Radio Pluto (EP) (2005)
- Precooked Munchies (EP) (2007)
- The Speed of Snow (EP) (2008)
- Preventive Medicine (EP) (2010)
- Nightshade Family (2011)
- Einzelkind (EP) (2011)
- #! (Shebang) (2015)

==== As TDJ Rome ====
- "Serenely Confident" / "Vivid Scarlet Hue" (2000)
- "Freeze Framez" / "Ground Clearance" (2000)
- "Vermond Curry" / "Babe Soda" (2001)

=== with Tangerine Dream ===
Major album releases

- 1989: Lily on the Beach (guest guitar on "Radio City")
- 1990: Melrose
- 1992: Rockoon
- 1992: 220 Volt Live (Live album)
- 1994: Turn of the Tides
- 1995: Tyranny of Beauty
- 1995: The Dream Mixes (Remix album)
- 1996: Goblins' Club
- 1997: Oasis (Soundtrack album)
- 1997: Tournado (Live album)
- 1997: TimeSquare (Remix and studio album)
- 1999: Mars Polaris
- 2005: Jeanne d'Arc

Other releases

- 1992: Rumpelstiltskin (Soundtrack)
- 1992: Quinoa (Mini album)
- 1997: Ambient Monkeys (Mini album)

=== With Loom ===
- 100 001 (EP) (2011)
- Scored (2012)
- 200 002 (EP) (2013)
- The Tree Hates the Forest (2013)
- 300 003 (EP) (2016)
- Years in Music (2016)

=== Compilations ===
- Unpleasant Poems: A Compilation (2004) - a compilation of the three TDJ Rome singles and two tracks by Ulrich Schnauss under the name "Ethereal 77"
- Cases of Recurrence (2012) - a compilation of EPs and rarities from the years 2005–2011
