= Zlatko Perica =

Croatian guitarist

Zlatko Perica (born 16 February 1969 in Rijeka, Yugoslavia) is a guitarist.

He was a member of the German group Tangerine Dream, joining in 1992 but in 1994 recorded his only studio album (Turn of the Tides) with the band, and in 1997 he would appear on his last live album (Valentine Wheels) with them. He later made guest live appearances with the group at London shows in 2003 and 2005. In 2005 he was the lead guitarist in Swiss musician DJ Bobo's "Pirates of Dance" tour.

Shortly after his birth, due to family and economic circumstances, he and his mother migrated from Croatia to Bern, Switzerland. Although he had been a fan of music since early childhood, he didn't start playing the guitar until the age of 14. Later he attended the Guitar Institute of Technology in Los Angeles, California.
