= Tangerine Dream =

German electronic music group

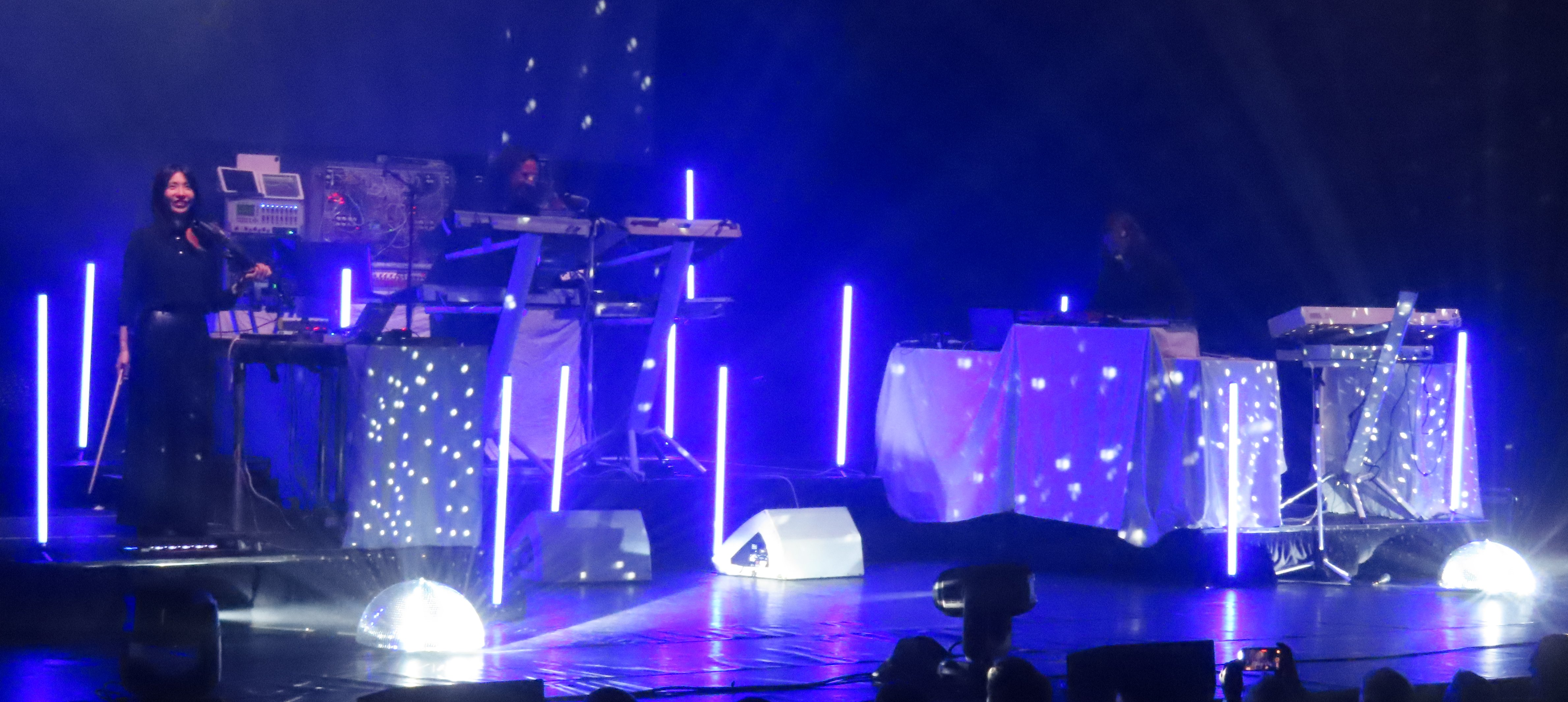
- Performing in 2024 at the Barbican Centre, London (l–r: Hoshiko Yamane, Thorsten Quaeschning, Paul Frick)

Background information
- Origin: West Berlin, Germany
- Genres: Electronic; kosmische; ambient; progressive rock; new-age; krautrock (early)
- Years active: 1967–present
- Labels: Virgin; Ohr; Jive Electro; Private Music; Miramar; TDI; Eastgate; Sequel/Castle/Sanctuary; BMG; Relativity; Esoteric Reactive; Kscope; Caroline; Invisible Hands; Purple Pyramid; Cleopatra; Free Union Records
- Members: Thorsten Quaeschning; Hoshiko Yamane; Paul Frick
- Past members: Edgar Froese; Lanse Hapshash; Kurt Herkenberg; Volker Hombach; Charlie Prince; Steve Jolliffe; Klaus Schulze; Conrad Schnitzler; Christopher Franke; Steve Schroyder; Peter Baumann; Michael Hoenig; Klaus Krüger; Johannes Schmoelling; Paul Haslinger; Ralf Wadephul; Jerome Froese; Linda Spa; Zlatko Perica; Iris Camaa; Bernhard Beibl; Ulrich Schnauss
- Website: tangerinedreammusic.com

Tangerine Dream is a German electronic music band founded in 1967 by Edgar Froese. The group has seen many personnel changes over the years, with Froese the only constant member until his death in January 2015. The best-known lineup of the group was its mid-1970s trio of Froese, Christopher Franke, and Peter Baumann. In 1979, Johannes Schmoelling replaced Baumann until his own departure in 1985. This lineup was notable for composing many movie soundtracks. Since Froese's death in 2015, the group has been under the leadership of Thorsten Quaeschning. Quaeschning is Froese's chosen successor and is currently the longest-serving band member, having joined in 2005. Quaeschning is currently joined by violinist Hoshiko Yamane who joined in 2011 and Paul Frick who joined in 2020. Prior to this Quaeschning and Yamane performed with Ulrich Schnauss from 2014 to 2020. Schnauss only played three shows with Froese in November 2014 before Froese's passing.

Tangerine Dream are considered a pioneering act in electronica. Their work with the electronic music Ohr label produced albums that had a pivotal role in the development of the German musical scene known as kosmische Musik ("cosmic music"). Their "Virgin Years", so called because of their association with Virgin Records, produced albums that further explored synthesizers and sequencers, including the UK top-20 albums Phaedra (1974) and Rubycon (1975). The group also had a successful career composing film soundtracks, creating over 60 scores.

From the late 1990s into the 2000s, Tangerine Dream continued to explore other styles of instrumental music as well as electronica. Their recorded output has been prolific, including over one hundred albums. Among other scoring projects, they helped create the soundtrack for the video game Grand Theft Auto V. Their mid-1970s work has been profoundly influential in the development of electronic music styles such as new-age and electronic dance music.

On 29 September 2017, the band released an all-new music studio album titled Quantum Gate. In December 2019, they released Recurring Dreams, a compilation of new recordings of some of the band's classic compositions. On 26 November 2021, the band released an EP entitled Probe 6–8 (including three tracks: "Raum", "Para Guy" and "Continuum"), whose concept was developed further on their following album Raum, their latest studio album to date, which was released on 25 February 2022.

== History ==
=== Origins: psychedelia and krautrock ===
Edgar Froese arrived in West Berlin in the mid-1960s to study art. His first band, the psychedelic rock-styled The Ones, disbanded after releasing only one single. After The Ones, Froese experimented with musical ideas, playing smaller gigs with a variety of musicians. Most of these performances were in the famous Zodiak Free Arts Lab, although one grouping also had the distinction of being invited to play for the surrealist painter Salvador Dalí. The music was partnered with literature, painting, early forms of multimedia, and more. It seemed as though only the most outlandish ideas attracted any attention, leading Froese to comment: "In the absurd often lies what is artistically possible." As members of the group came and went, the direction of the music continued to be inspired by the Surrealists, and the group came to be called by the surreal-sounding name of Tangerine Dream, inspired by mishearing the line "tangerine trees and marmalade skies" from the Beatles' track "Lucy in the Sky with Diamonds".

Froese was fascinated by technology and skilled in using it to create music. He built custom-made instruments and, wherever he went, collected sounds with tape recorders for use in constructing musical works later. His early work with tape loops and other repeating sounds was a precursor to the emerging technology of the sequencer, which Tangerine Dream quickly adopted upon its arrival.

Released in 1970 by record label Ohr, the first Tangerine Dream album, Electronic Meditation, was a tape-collage Krautrock piece, using the technology of the time rather than the synthesized music they later became famous for. The line-up for the album was Froese, Klaus Schulze, and Conrad Schnitzler. Electronic Meditation began the period known as the Pink Years (the Ohr logo was a pink ear). Subsequent albums, beginning with Alpha Centauri, relied heavily on electronic instruments. The band's music during the early 1970s prominently featured organ from Steve Schroyder (on Alpha Centauri) or Peter Baumann (on subsequent releases), commonly augmented by guitar from Froese and drums from Christopher Franke. They also started their heavy usage of the Mellotron during this period.

=== Rise to fame: the Virgin years ===
The band's 1973 album Atem was named as one of British DJ John Peel's records of the year, and this attention helped Tangerine Dream to sign to the fledgling Virgin Records in the same year. Soon afterward, they released the album Phaedra, an eerie soundscape that unexpectedly reached No. 15 in the UK Albums Chart and became one of Virgin's first bona fide hits. Phaedra was one of the first commercial albums to feature sequencers and came to define much more than just the band's own sound. The creation of the album's title track was something of an accident: the band was experimenting in the studio with a recently acquired Moog synthesizer, and the tape happened to be rolling at the time. They kept the results and later added recorder, bass guitar, and Mellotron performances. The Moog, like many other early synthesizers, was so sensitive to changes in temperature that its oscillators would drift badly in tuning as the equipment warmed up, and this drift can easily be heard on the final recording. However, while the Moog provided the sequences, the band's dominant instrument during this period was the Mellotron, with the band using four of them, not only for polyphonic textures but also for sound effects. Many of their electronic sounds were recorded on custom Mellotron tapes for live performance. The track "Mysterious Semblance at the Strand of Nightmares" was entirely played on a Mellotron. Phaedra marked the beginning of the period known as the 'Virgin Years'.

Their mid-1970s work has been profoundly influential in the development of electronic music styles such as new-age (although the band themselves disliked the term) and electronic dance music.

In the 1980s, along with other electronic music pioneers such as Jean-Michel Jarre (with whom Edgar Froese collaborated on Jarre's 2015 album Electronica 1: The Time Machine) and Vangelis, the band were early adopters of the new digital technology, which revolutionized the sound of the synthesizer, although the group had been using digital equipment (in some shape or form) as early as the mid-1970s. Their technical competence and extensive experience in their early years with self-made instruments and unusual means of creating sounds meant that they were able to exploit this new technology to make music quite unlike anything heard before.

=== Tangerine Dream live ===
Tangerine Dream's earliest concerts were visually simple by modern standards, with three men sitting motionless for hours alongside massive electronic boxes festooned with patch cords and a few flashing lights. Some concerts were even performed in complete darkness, as happened during the performance at York Minster on 20 October 1975. As time went on and technology advanced, the concerts became much more elaborate, with visual effects, lighting, lasers, pyrotechnics, and projected images. By 1977 their North American tour featured full-scale Laserium effects.

Through the 1970s and 1980s, the band toured extensively. The concerts generally included large amounts of unreleased and improvised material and were consequently widely bootlegged. They were notorious for playing extremely loudly and for a long time. The band released recordings of a fair number of their concerts, and on some of these the band worked out material that would later form the backbone of their studio recordings.

=== Forays into vocals ===
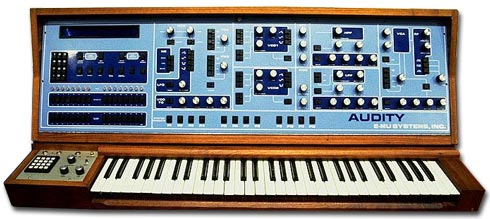
The E-mu Audity synthesizer, commissioned by Peter Baumann in 1979

Most of Tangerine Dream's albums are entirely instrumental. Two earlier albums that prominently featured lyrics were Cyclone (1978) and Tyger (1987). While there were occasionally a few vocals on the band's other releases, such as the track "Kiew Mission" from 1981's Exit and "The Harbor" from 1987's Shy People, the group only returned to featuring vocals on a larger scale in a musical trilogy based on Dante's Divine Comedy. This was followed by a 2007 album Madcap's Flaming Duty and a 2010 cover collection Under Cover – Chapter One.

After their 1980 East Berlin gig, when they became one of the first major Western bands to perform in a communist country, Tangerine Dream released a double live album of one of their performances there, called Poland, recorded during their tour in the winter at the end of 1983. With Poland, the band moved to the Jive Electro label, marking the beginning of the Blue Years.

=== Soundtracks ===
Throughout the 1980s, Tangerine Dream composed scores for more than 20 films. This had been an interest of Froese's since the late 1960s, when he scored and acted in the experimental film "Auf Scheißer schießt man nicht", directed by Hansjürgen Pohland. Many of the group's soundtracks were composed at least partially of reworked material from the band's studio albums or work that was in progress for upcoming albums; see, for example, the resemblance between the track "Igneous" on their soundtrack for Thief and the track "Thru Metamorphic Rocks" on their studio release Force Majeure. Their first exposure on US television came when a track for the then in-progress album Le Parc was used as the theme for the television program, Street Hawk. Some of the more famous soundtracks have been Sorcerer, Thief, Legend, Risky Business, The Keep, Firestarter, Flashpoint, Heartbreakers, Shy People, and Near Dark.

Tangerine Dream also composed 35 hours of music stems for the video game, Grand Theft Auto V.

In 2016, Tangerine Dream released their own version of the theme music for the television series Stranger Things. Tangerine Dream had inspired music for the series.

=== Going independent ===
Several of the band's albums released during the 1990s were nominated for Grammy Awards. Since then, Tangerine Dream with Jerome Froese took a directional change away from the new-age leanings of those albums and toward an electronica style. After Jerome's departure, founder Edgar Froese steered the band in a direction somewhat reminiscent of material throughout their career.

In later years, Tangerine Dream released albums in series. The Dream Mixes series began in 1995 with the last being released in 2010. The Divine Comedy series, based on the writings of Dante Alighieri, spanned 2002–2006. From 2007 to 2010, the Five Atomic Seasons were released. Most recently, the Eastgate Sonic Poems series, based on the works of famous poetic authors such as Edgar Allan Poe and Franz Kafka, began in 2011, with the last appearing in 2013. Also, beginning in 2007, Tangerine Dream released a number of EPs, referred to as "CupDiscs" by the band.

Edgar Froese also released a number of solo recordings, which are similar in style to Tangerine Dream's work. Jerome Froese released a number of singles as TDJ Rome, which are similar to his work within the Dream Mixes series. In 2005, he released his first solo album Neptunes under the name Jerome Froese. In 2006, Jerome left Tangerine Dream to concentrate on his solo career. His second solo album Shiver Me Timbers was released on 29 October 2007, and his third, Far Side of the Face, was released in 2012. Beginning in 2011, Jerome Froese joined with former Tangerine Dream member Johannes Schmoelling and keyboardist Robert Waters to form the band Loom, which plays original material, as well as Tangerine Dream classics. Thorsten Quaeschning, leader of Picture Palace Music, was brought into Tangerine Dream in 2005 and contributed to most of the band's albums and CupDiscs since then.

The group had recording contracts with Ohr, Virgin, Jive Electro, Private Music, and Miramar, and many of the minor soundtracks were released on Varèse Sarabande. In 1996, the band founded their own record label, TDI, and more recently, Eastgate. Subsequent albums are today generally not available in normal retail channels but are sold by mail-order or through online channels. The same applies to their Miramar releases, the rights to which the band bought back. Meanwhile, their Ohr and Jive Electro catalogs (known as the "Pink" and "Blue" Years) are currently owned by Esoteric Recordings.

Since 2017, Tangerine Dream has been signed to the independent label Kscope, which has released their studio albums Quantum Gate, Recurring Dreams and Raum.

=== Concert updates ===
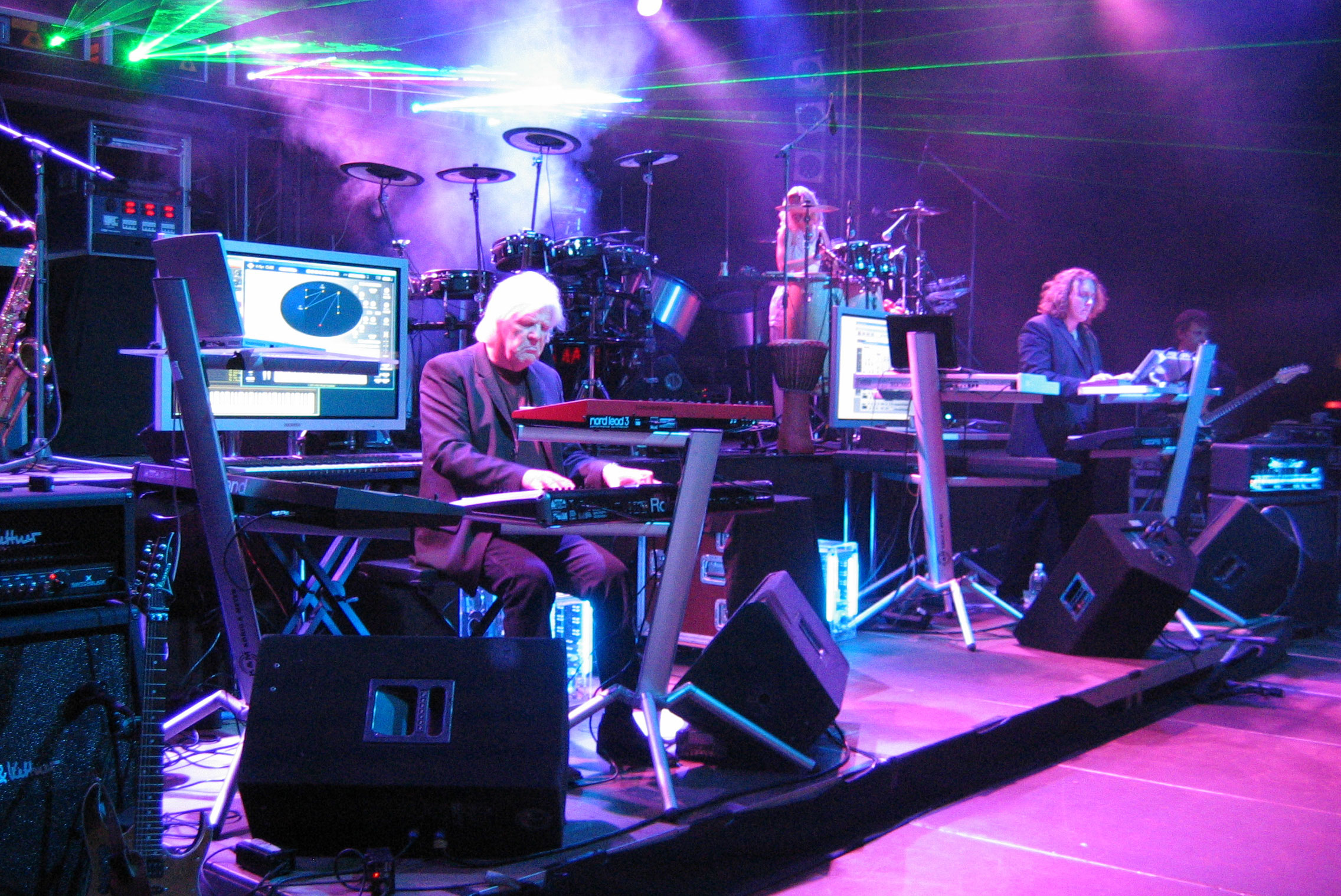
Tangerine Dream performing in 2007

To celebrate their 40th anniversary (1967–2007), Tangerine Dream announced their only UK concert: at London Astoria on 20 April 2007. The band also played a totally free open-air concert in Eberswalde on 1 July 2007 and at the Alte Oper in Frankfurt on Main on 7 October 2007. 2008 saw the band in Eindhoven Netherlands playing at E-Day (an electronic music festival); later in the year they also played the Night of the Prog Festival in Loreley, Germany, as well as concerts at the Kentish Town Forum, in London on 1 November, at the Picture House, Edinburgh on 2 November, and their first live concert in the US for over a decade, at the UCLA Royce Hall, Los Angeles on 7 November.

In 2009, the group announced that they would play a concert at the Royal Albert Hall in London, on 1 April 2010, titled the Zeitgeist concert, 35 years after their milestone concert there on 2 April 1975. The entire concert was released as a 3-CD live album on 7 July 2010.

Tangerine Dream embarked in spring and summer 2012 on a tour of Europe, Canada and the USA called The Electric Mandarine Tour 2012: The 1st leg was a 5-date European tour, beginning on 10 April in Budapest (Hungary) via Padua (Italy), Milano (Italy), Zurich (Switzerland), and ending on 10 May in Berlin (Germany). The 2nd leg was a North-American tour that started with the Jazz Festival in Montréal (Canada) on 30 June, followed by a concert on 4 July at the Bluesfest in Ottawa (Canada) and continued as a 10-date US journey beginning in July in Boston, then New York, Philadelphia, Washington, and California. On 16 November 2014, Tangerine Dream performed in Melbourne, Australia, as part of Melbourne Music Week. They were the final shows with Froese. Tangerine Dream played two consecutive nights at the Union Chapel, Islington London on 23 & 24 April 2018, the second supported by ex-Japan and Porcupine Tree musician Richard Barbieri. In October and November 2019, Tangerine Dream went on its 16 step Random & Revision Tour.

2023 saw the band embark on the largest tour of their entire career, including a 19-date tour of North America (8 September – 5 October: taking in Miami, Asheville, Atlanta, Dallas, Austin, Albuquerque, Tucson, San Diego, Los Angeles, San Francisco, Portland, Vancouver, Seattle, Philadelphia, Washington, New York, Montreal, Toronto and Chicago), 13-dates in Germany ( 10–28 October), and 10-dates in the UK ( 5–14 November)

=== After Edgar Froese's death ===
Edgar Froese died suddenly in Vienna on 20 January 2015 from a pulmonary embolism. On 6 April 2015, the group's remaining members (Quaeschning, Schnauss and Yamane) and Bianca Acquaye (Froese's widow), pledged to continue working together in an effort to fulfill Froese's vision for the group. However, ex-member Jerome Froese announced on his Facebook timeline that, in his opinion, Tangerine Dream will not exist without his father.

Tangerine Dream played their first show following Froese's death on 9 June 2016 in Szczecin, Poland.

On 29 September 2017, Tangerine Dream released the studio album Quantum Gate, celebrating the 50th anniversary of the band's foundation. The album is based on ideas and musical sketches by founder Edgar Froese and was completed by the remaining members of the band.

On 31 January 2020, Tangerine Dream re-released their December 2019 album Recurring Dreams, an eleven-track collection of new recordings of some of the band's classic tracks, worldwide through Kscope. This was launched to coincide with the Tangerine Dream: Zeitraffer exhibition, which opened on 17 January 2020 at London's Barbican and ran until 2 May 2020.

On 9 June 2020, Paul Frick became the first member to join the group following Edgar's death after having made guest appearances with the band, starting in November 2018. Later on, the group started working on the studio album Raum, featuring Froese's archival recordings in early 2022 via Kscope. Frick has the unique distinction of being the first addition to the group who did not ever personally meet Froese.

It was announced on 22 June 2021 that Ulrich Schnauss has decided to stop performing live. Since then, the band's official website lists him as a former member.

In March 2023, the band embarked on the longest tour of their entire career, with concerts in Portugal (Casa da Música), Switzerland (Geneva's Electron Festival), the Netherlands (3-date tour), Belgium (Het Depot), France (La Gaîté Lyrique), Poland (2-date tour), Romania (Transilvania International Film Festival), the United States (16-date tour), Canada (3-date tour), Germany (12-date tour), the United Kingdom (10-date tour), and Poland (1-date).

== Artistic connections ==
=== Influences ===
Tangerine Dream began as a surreal krautrock band, with each of the members contributing different musical influences and styles, before becoming a "revered progressive electronic act." Edgar Froese's guitar style was inspired by Jimi Hendrix, as well as the avant-garde composers Iannis Xenakis and Karlheinz Stockhausen, while Christopher Franke contributed elements of György Ligeti and Terry Riley. Yes-like progressive rock influence was brought in by Steve Jolliffe on Cyclone. The sample-based sound collages of Johannes Schmoelling drew their inspiration from a number of sources; one instance is Steve Reich's Music for 18 Musicians on parts of Logos Live, and the track "Love on a Real Train" from the Risky Business soundtrack.

Classical music has had an influence on the sound of Tangerine Dream over the years. György Ligeti, Johann Sebastian Bach, Pierre Boulez, Iannis Xenakis, Maurice Ravel, and Arcangelo Corelli are clearly visible as dominant influences in the early albums. A Baroque sensibility sometimes informs the more coordinated sequencer patterns, which has its most direct expression in the La Folia section that comes at the very end of the title track of Force Majeure. In live performances, the piano solos often directly quoted from Romantic classical works for piano, such as the Beethoven and Mozart snippets in much of the late 1970s – early 1980s stage shows. In the bootleg recording of the Mannheim Mozartsaal concert of 1976 (Tangerine Tree volume 13), the first part of the first piece also clearly quotes from Franz Liszt's Totentanz. The first phrase is played on a harpsichord synthesizer patch and is answered by the second half of the phrase in a flute voicing on a Mellotron. During the 1990s, many releases included recordings of classical compositions: Pictures at an Exhibition (on Turn of the Tides), Largo (from Xerxes) (on Tyranny of Beauty), Symphony in A Minor (by J. S. Bach), and Concerto in A Major / Adagio (by Wolfgang Amadeus Mozart) (both on Ambient Monkeys).

Since the 1990s, Tangerine Dream have also recorded cover versions of Jimi Hendrix' "Purple Haze" (first on 220 Volt Live) and The Beatles' "Eleanor Rigby", "Back in the U.S.S.R.", "Tomorrow Never Knows", and "Norwegian Wood".

An infrequently recurring non-musical influence on Tangerine Dream, and Edgar Froese in particular, have been 12th–19th-century poets. This was first evident on the 1981 album Exit, the track title "Pilots of the Purple Twilight" being a quote from Alfred Lord Tennyson's poem Locksley Hall. Six years later, the album Tyger featured poems from William Blake set to music; and around the turn of the millennium, Edgar Froese started working on a musical trilogy based on Dante Alighieri's Divine Comedy, completed in 2006. Most recently, the 2007 album Madcap's Flaming Duty features more poems set to music, some again from Blake but also e.g. Walt Whitman.

Pink Floyd were also an influence on Edgar Froese and Tangerine Dream, the band in its very early psychedelic rock band phase playing improvisations based on Pink Floyd's "Interstellar Overdrive". Madcap's Flaming Duty is dedicated to the memory of the late Syd Barrett. The title refers to Barrett's solo release The Madcap Laughs.

The band's influence can be felt in ambient artists such as Deepspace, The Future Sound of London, David Kristian, and Global Communication, as well as rock, pop, and dance artists such as Porcupine Tree, M83, DJ Shadow, Ulrich Schnauss, Cut Copy, and Kasabian. The band also clearly influenced 1990s and 2000s trance music, notably Chicane; both "Offshore" and "Sunstroke" borrow heavily from "Love on a Real Train" where lush soundscapes and synth pads are used along with repetitive synth sequences, much like in their 1975 releases Rubycon and Ricochet, as well as some of their music from the early 1980s. The group have also been sampled countless times, more recently by Recoil on the album SubHuman, by Sasha on Involver, and on several Houzan Suzuki albums. Michael Jackson also expressed being a fan of Tangerine Dream, specifically their 1977 soundtrack for the film Sorcerer. It inspired him to get a Synclavier II, a demo being used as the intro for Beat It.

=== In popular culture ===
- In the critically acclaimed 1991 Mexican telenovela Cadenas de amargura, Tangerine Dream's song "Yucatan" is used as part of the novela's music score particularly in the more suspenseful scenes.
- Steven Wilson, of Porcupine Tree, stated that Tangerine Dream was one of his influences to make his music, and often cites Zeit as his all-time favorite album.
- Japanese electronic musician Susumu Hirasawa dedicated his song "Island Door (Paranesian Circle)" (トビラ島（パラネシアン・サークル）, Tobira Shima (Paraneshian Circle)) to Tangerine Dream.
- In 2016, Netflix's original show Stranger Things used three Tangerine Dream tracks in its soundtrack: "Green Desert" from Green Desert (1986) in episode five, "Exit" from Exit (1981) in episode six, of season 1 and "Tangent (Rare Bird)" from Poland (1984) in episode nine of season 2. Composers of the soundtrack for the show, Kyle Dixon and Michael Stein of the electronic band Survive, also cited Tangerine Dream as the key influence behind the soundtrack, the main theme of which was later covered by Tangerine Dream.
- In 2022, the horned dinosaur Bisticeratops froeseorum was named in memory of Edgar Froese, the late founder of Tangerine Dream.
- Tangerine Dream was cited as an influence by Dopplereffekt, an electronic music group with origins in Detroit, in a 2025 episode of Benji B's BBC Radio 1 show.

== Personnel ==
In the late 1960s and early 1970s, Tangerine Dream existed as several short-lived incarnations, all of which included Froese, who teamed up with several musicians from West Berlin's underground music scene, including Steve Jolliffe, Sven-Åke Johansson, Klaus Schulze, and Conrad Schnitzler.

Froese's most notable association was his partnership with Christopher Franke. Franke joined Tangerine Dream in 1970 after serving time in the group Agitation Free, originally to replace Schulze as the drummer. Franke is credited with starting to use electronic sequencers, which were introduced on Phaedra, a development that had not only a large impact on the group's music but on many electronic musicians to this day. Franke stayed with the group for 17 years, leaving in 1988 because of exhausting touring schedules, as well as creative differences with Froese.

Other long-term members of the group include Peter Baumann (1971–1977), who later went on to found the new-age label Private Music, to which the band was signed from 1988 to 1991; Johannes Schmoelling (1979–1985); Paul Haslinger (1986–1990); Froese's son Jerome Froese (1990–2006); Linda Spa (1990–1996, 2005–2014), a saxophonist & flute player who appeared on numerous albums and concerts, contributing one track on Goblins' Club; and most recently Thorsten Quaeschning of Picture Palace Music (2005–present).

A number of other members were also part of Tangerine Dream for shorter periods of time. Unlike session musicians, these players also contributed to compositions of the band during their tenures. Some of the more notable members are Steve Schroyder (organist, 1971–1972), Michael Hoenig (who replaced Baumann for a 1975 Australian tour and a London concert, included on Bootleg Box Set Vol. 1), Steve Jolliffe (wind instruments, keyboards and vocals on Cyclone and the following tour; he was also part of a short-lived 1969 line-up), Klaus Krüger (drummer on Cyclone and Force Majeure) and Ralf Wadephul (in collaboration with Edgar Froese recorded album Blue Dawn, but it was released only in 2006; also credited for one track on Optical Race (1988) and toured with the band in support of this album).

Throughout the 1990s and into the 2000s, Tangerine Dream was often joined on stage by Zlatko Perica or Gerald Gradwohl on guitars, and Emil Hachfeld on electronic drums. Jerome Froese left in 2006 after a concert at the Tempodrom in Berlin. Until late 2014, Tangerine Dream comprised Edgar Froese, as well as Thorsten Quaeschning, who first collaborated in the composition of Jeanne d'Arc (2005). For concerts and recordings, they were usually joined by Linda Spa on saxophone and flute, Iris Camaa on drums and percussion, and Bernhard Beibl on guitar. In 2011, violinist Hoshiko Yamane was added to the lineup and is featured on some of the most recent albums.

In late 2014, Bernhard Beibl announced on his Facebook page that he would stop collaborating with Tangerine Dream. Shortly thereafter, it was announced that Tangerine Dream would no longer be touring with Linda Spa or Iris Camaa, but that Ulrich Schnauss had been brought into the fold. Edgar Froese's death in January 2015, however, left this a short-lived line-up.

=== Members ===
Current members

- Thorsten Quaeschning – bandleader, music director, synthesizer, sequencer, drums, guitar (2004–present) Recording engineer; (2003)
- Hoshiko Yamane – acoustic violin, 5-string electric violin/viola, cello, Ableton Push controller, looper, synthesizer (2011–present)
- Paul Frick – synthesizer, piano, sequencer, looper (2020–present, guest: 2018–2020)

Bianca Froese-Acquaye, Edgar Froese's widow, has taken up the mantle of continuing the legacy of the group and works closely in a non-musical capacity with the remaining members.

Former members

- Edgar Froese – leader and founder, keyboards, guitars (1967–2015; his death)
- Christopher Franke – keyboards, drums (1970–1987)
- Peter Baumann – keyboards, recorder (1971–1973, 1973–1975, 1975–1977)
- Johannes Schmoelling – keyboards (1979–1985)
- Jerome Froese – keyboards, guitars, drums (1990–2006)
- Paul Haslinger – keyboards, guitars (1986–1990)
- Linda Spa – saxophone, flute, keyboards (1990–1996, 2005–2014)
- Klaus Schulze – drums, percussion (1969–1970; died 2022)
- Conrad Schnitzler – cello, violin, fx (1969–1970; died 2011)
- Steve Jolliffe – saxophone, keyboards, flute, vocals (1969, 1978)
- Michael Hoenig – keyboards (1975)
- Ulrich Schnauss – synthesizer, piano, sequencer, Ableton (2014–2020)
- Klaus Krüger – drums, percussion (1978–1979)
- Ralf Wadephul – keyboards (1988–1989)
- Andy Kanavan – drums, (1993–1995) [hired musician]
- Steve Schroyder – keyboards, vocals (1970–1971)
- Bernhard Beibl – guitars, violin (2006–2014) [hired musician]
- Iris Camaa – percussion, vocals Roland V-Drums (2001–2014) [hired musician]
- Zlatko Perica – guitars (1992–1997) [hired musician]
- Al Akhbar – drums and percussion (1969)
- Happy Dieter – bass (1969; died 1974)
- Lanse Hapshash – drums (1967–1969)
- Kurt Herkenberg – bass (1968–1969; died 1983)
- Volker Hombach – saxophone, violin, flute (1967–1969)
- Charlie Prince – vocals (1967–1968)

=== Line-ups ===
1967–1968	1968–1969	1969	1969–1970
Edgar Froese – guitars; Lanse Hapshash – drums; Kurt Herkenberg – bass; Volker Hombach – saxophone, violin, flute; Charlie Prince – vocals	Edgar Froese – guitars; Lanse Hapshash – drums; Kurt Herkenberg – bass; Volker Hombach – saxophone, violin, flute	Edgar Froese – keyboards, guitars; Steve Jolliffe – saxophone, flute, keyboards; Klaus Schulze – drums, percussion	Edgar Froese – keyboards, guitars; Klaus Schulze – drums, percussion; Conrad Schnitzler – cello, violin
1970–1971	1971–1975	1975	1975–1977
Edgar Froese – keyboards, guitars; Christopher Franke – keyboards, drums; Steve Schroyder – keyboards, vocals	Edgar Froese – keyboards, guitars; Christopher Franke – keyboards, drums; Peter Baumann – keyboards	Edgar Froese – keyboards, guitars; Christopher Franke – keyboards, drums; Michael Hoenig – keyboards	Edgar Froese – keyboards, guitars; Christopher Franke – keyboards, drums; Peter Baumann – keyboards
1977–1978	1978	1978–1979	1979–1985
Edgar Froese – keyboards, guitars; Christopher Franke – keyboards, drums	Edgar Froese – keyboards, guitars; Christopher Franke – keyboards; Steve Jolliffe – saxophone, flute, keyboards; Klaus Krüger – drums, percussion	Edgar Froese – keyboards, guitars; Christopher Franke – keyboards, drums; Klaus Krüger – drums, percussion	Edgar Froese – keyboards, guitars; Christopher Franke – keyboards, drums; Johannes Schmoelling – keyboards
1985–1986	1986–1987	1987–1988	1988
Edgar Froese – keyboards, guitars; Christopher Franke – keyboards, drums	Edgar Froese – keyboards, guitars; Christopher Franke – keyboards, drums; Paul Haslinger – keyboards, guitars	Edgar Froese – keyboards, guitars; Paul Haslinger – keyboards, guitars	Edgar Froese – keyboards, guitars; Paul Haslinger – keyboards, guitars; Ralf Wadephul – keyboards
1988–1990	1990	1990–1992	1992–1996
Edgar Froese – keyboards, guitars; Paul Haslinger – keyboards, guitars	Edgar Froese – keyboards, guitars; Paul Haslinger – keyboards, guitars; Jerome Froese – keyboards, guitars	Edgar Froese – keyboards, guitars; Jerome Froese – keyboards, guitars; Linda Spa – saxophone, flute, keyboards	Edgar Froese – keyboards, guitars; Jerome Froese – keyboards, guitars; Linda Spa – saxophone, flute, keyboards; Zlatko Perica – guitars
1996–1997	1997–2001	2001–2005	2005–2006
Edgar Froese – keyboards, guitars; Jerome Froese – keyboards, guitars; Zlatko Perica – guitars	Edgar Froese – keyboards, guitars; Jerome Froese – keyboards, guitars	Edgar Froese – keyboards, guitars; Jerome Froese – keyboards, guitars; Iris Camaa – percussion, V-drums	Edgar Froese – keyboards, guitars; Jerome Froese – keyboards, guitars; Linda Spa – saxophone, flute, keyboards; Iris Camaa – percussion, V-drums; Thorsten Quaeschning – keyboards, drums, vocals
2006–2011	2011–2014	2014–2015	2015–2020
Edgar Froese – keyboards, guitars; Linda Spa – saxophone, flute, keyboards; Iris Camaa – percussion, V-drums; Thorsten Quaeschning – keyboards, drums, vocals; Bernhard Beibl – guitars, violin	Edgar Froese – keyboards, guitars; Linda Spa – saxophone, flute, keyboards; Iris Camaa – percussion, V-drums; Thorsten Quaeschning – keyboards, drums, vocals; Bernhard Beibl – guitars, violin; Hoshiko Yamane – violin, cello	Edgar Froese – keyboards, guitars; Thorsten Quaeschning – keyboards, drums, vocals; Hoshiko Yamane – violin, cello; Ulrich Schnauss – keyboards	Thorsten Quaeschning – keyboards, guitar, drums; Hoshiko Yamane – violin/viola, cello, ableton push controller, looper; Ulrich Schnauss – keyboards, sequencer control, real-time ableton manipulation, effects
2020–present
Thorsten Quaeschning – keyboards, guitar, drums; Hoshiko Yamane – violin/viola, ableton push controller, looper, effect pedals; Paul Frick – keyboards

=== Guest musicians ===
- Jimmy Jackson (1970) – organ on Electronic Meditation
- Thomas Keyserling (1970) – flute on Electronic Meditation
- Udo Dennebourg (1971) – flute on Alpha Centauri
- Roland Paulick (1971) – synthesizer on Alpha Centauri
- Florian Fricke (1972)
- Christian Vallbracht (1972)
- Jochen von Grumbcow (1972)
- Hans Joachim Brüne (1972)
- Johannes Lücke (1972)
- Eduard Meyer (1979) – cello on Force Majeure
- Susanne Pawlitzki (1985)
- Jocelyn Bernadette Smith (1987)
- Jacquie Virgil (1987)
- Diamond Ross (1987)
- Hubert Waldner (1989–1990)
- Chi Coltrane (1991)
- Enrico Fernandez (1992)
- Richi Wester (1992)
- Jayney Klimek – vocals (1992–1994, 2002–2005)
- Roland Braunstein (1993)
- Julie Ocean (1993)
- Mark Hornby (1994–2002)
- Gerald Gradwohl – guitars (1994–1996, 1999–2001, 2006–2007)
- Gisela Kloetzer (1994)
- Milan Polak (1995)
- Emil Hachfeld – codotronic drums (1997–1999)
- Vicki McClure (1998)
- Barbara Kindermann (2001)
- Claire Foquet (2001)
- Jane Monet (2001)
- Bianca Acquaye (2001, 2005)
- Bry Gonzales (2001)
- Jack Liberty (2002, 2009)
- Lerk Andebracht (2002, 2009)
- Zlatko Perica – guitars (2003–2005) (1992–1997; hired member)
- Saskia Klumpp (2003, 2005)
- Tatjana Kouchev (2005)
- Fridolin Johann Harms (2005)
- Brandenburg Symphonic Orchestra (2005)
- Neuer Kammerchor Potsdam (2005)
- Claire Fouquet (2005)
- Barbara Kindermann (2005, 2008)
- Diane Miller (2005)
- Jane Monet (2005)
- Christian Hausl (2006–2007, 2010)
- Gynt Beator (2006)
- Thomas Beator (2006)
- Hetty Snell (2010)
- Zoe Marshall (2010)
- Stephanie Oade (2010)
- Rebecca J. Herman (2010)
- Carolina Eyck (Session guest 2017)
- Richard Barbieri (Session 2018)
- Franz Bargmann (Session 2019)
- Paul Frick (2018–2020) (2020–present; full time member)
- Steve Hillage (Session guest 2020)
- Michał Łapaj (Session guest 2021)
- Steve Rothery (Session guest 2022)
- Steve Roach (Session guest 2023)
- Robert Rich (Session guest 2023)
- Julie Slick (Session guest 2023)
- Cliff Hewitt (Session guest 2023)
- Nick Beggs (Session guest 2023)
- Robin Boult (Session guest 2023)
- Ali Ferguson (Session guest 2023)

== Discography ==
Tangerine Dream has released over one hundred albums (not counting compilations and fan releases) over the last five decades. A project to collect and release fan concert recordings, known as the Tangerine Tree, was active from 2002 to 2006.

Core catalogue

1. Electronic Meditation (1970)
2. Alpha Centauri (1971)
3. Zeit (1972)
4. Atem (1973)
5. Phaedra (1974)
6. Rubycon (1975)
7. Ricochet (1975) (Live/Studio)
8. Stratosfear (1976)
9. Sorcerer (1977) (Soundtrack)
10. Encore (1977) (Live/Studio)
11. Cyclone (1978)
12. Force Majeure (1979)
13. Tangram (1980)
14. Quichotte (1981) (Live/Studio)
15. Thief (1981) (Soundtrack)
16. Exit (1981)
17. White Eagle (1982)
18. Logos (1982) (Live/Studio)
19. Hyperborea (1983)
20. Wavelength (1983) (Soundtrack)
21. Risky Business (1984) (Soundtrack)
22. Firestarter (1984) (Soundtrack)
23. Flashpoint (1984) (Soundtrack)
24. Poland (1984) (Live/Studio)
25. Heartbreakers (1985) (Soundtrack)
26. Le Parc (1985)
27. Green Desert (1986) (recorded 1973)
28. Legend (1986) (Soundtrack)
29. Underwater Sunlight (1986)
30. Tyger (1987)
31. Canyon Dreams (1987) (Video album, issued on CD 1991)
32. Three O'Clock High (1987) (Soundtrack)
33. Near Dark (1988) (Soundtrack)
34. Shy People (1988) (Soundtrack)
35. Livemiles (1988) (Live/Studio)
36. Optical Race (1988)
37. Miracle Mile (1989) (Soundtrack)
38. Lily on the Beach (1989)
39. Destination Berlin (1989) (Soundtrack)
40. Melrose (1990)
41. Dead Solid Perfect (1991) (Soundtrack, recorded 1988)
42. The Park Is Mine (1991) (Soundtrack, recorded 1985)
43. L'Affaire Wallraff (The Man Inside) (1991) (Soundtrack, recorded 1989)
44. Rockoon (1992)
45. Rumpelstiltskin (1992) (Soundtrack)
46. Quinoa (1992)
47. Deadly Care (1992) (Soundtrack, recorded 1987)
48. 220 Volt (1993) (Live/Studio)
49. Turn of the Tides (1994)
50. Catch Me If You Can (1994) (Soundtrack, recorded 1989)
51. Tyranny of Beauty (1995)
52. The Dream Mixes (1995) (Remixes/Studio)
53. Zoning (1996) (Soundtrack, recorded 1994)
54. Goblins' Club (1996)
55. Oasis (1997) (Video album/CD soundtrack)
56. TimeSquare – Dream Mixes II (1997) (Remixes/Studio)
57. Ambient Monkeys (1997)
58. The Hollywood Years Vol. 1 (1998)
59. The Hollywood Years Vol. 2 (1998)
60. Transsiberia (1998)
61. What a Blast (1999) (Soundtrack)
62. Mars Polaris (1999)
63. Great Wall of China (1999)
64. The Seven Letters from Tibet (2000)
65. The Past Hundred Moons – Dream Mixes Three (2001) (Remixes/Studio)
66. Inferno (2002) (Live/Studio)
67. Mota Atma (2003)
68. DM 4 – Dream Mixes 4 (2003) (Remixes/Studio)
69. Purgatorio (2004)
70. Kyoto (2005) (partially recorded 1983)
71. Jeanne d'Arc (2005)
72. Phaedra 2005 (2005) (Re-recording)
73. Blue Dawn (2006) (partially recorded 1988)
74. Paradiso (2006)
75. Plays Tangerine Dream (2006) (Re-recordings/Remixes)
76. Springtime in Nagasaki (2007)
77. Madcap's Flaming Duty (2007)
78. Summer in Nagasaki (2007)
79. Booster (2007) (Compilation/Studio)
80. Purple Diluvial (2008)
81. Views from a Red Train (2008)
82. The Anthology Decades (2008)
83. Tangram 2008 (2008) (Re-recording)
84. Hyperborea 2008 (2008) (Re-recording)
85. Autumn in Hiroshima (2008)
86. Booster II (2008) (Compilation/Studio)
87. Chandra – The Phantom Ferry Part I (2009)
88. Winter in Hiroshima (2009)
89. Booster III (2009) (Compilation/Studio)
90. DM V – Dream Mixes 5 (2010) (Remixes/Studio)
91. Under Cover – Chapter One (2010) (Covers)
92. The Endless Season (2010)
93. Booster IV (2011) (Compilation/Studio)
94. The Island of the Fay (2011)
95. The Angel of the West Window (2011)
96. Mona da Vinci (2011)
97. Finnegans Wake (2011)
98. Machu Picchu (2012)
99. Booster V (2012) (Compilation/Studio)
100. Cruise to Destiny (2013) (Live rehearsal recording)
101. Starmus – Sonic Universe (2013) (Live with Brian May)
102. One Night in Africa (2013) (Compilation/Studio)
103. Booster VI (2013) (Compilation/Studio)
104. The Castle (2013)
105. The Cinematographic Score – GTA 5 (2014) (Video game soundtrack)
106. Chandra – The Phantom Ferry Part II (2014)
107. Sorcerer 2014 (2014) (Live re-recording & new material)
108. Mala Kunia (2014)
109. Booster VII (2015) (Compilation/Studio)
110. Quantum Key (2015)
111. Particles (2016) (Collection of live and studio)
112. Light Flux (2017) (Compilation/Studio)
113. The Sessions I (2017) (Live real time compositions)
114. Quantum Gate (2017)
115. The Sessions II (2018) (Live real time compositions)
116. The Sessions III (2018) (Live real time compositions)
117. The Sessions IV (2018) (Live real time compositions)
118. Oedipus Tyrannus (2019) (recorded 1974)
119. The Sessions V (2019) (Live real time compositions)
120. Recurring Dreams (2019) (Compilation/Studio re-recordings)
121. The Sessions VI (2020) (Live real time compositions)
122. The Soldier (2020) (Soundtrack, recorded 1981/2)
123. The Keep (2020) (Soundtrack, recorded 1983) (Remixes previously released in 1997)
124. The Sessions VII (2021) (Live real time compositions)
125. Raum (2022)
126. Strange Behavior (2022) (Soundtrack, recorded 1981)
127. The Sessions VIII (2023) (Live real time compositions)
