= In Search of Hades: The Virgin Recordings 1973–1979 =

In Search of Hades: The Virgin Recordings 1973 - 1979

Compilation album by Tangerine Dream
- Released: 14 June 2019
- Recorded: 1973 – 1979
- Genres: Electronic, ambient, progressive rock, krautrock
- Label: UMC/Virgin

Tangerine Dream chronology
In Search of Hades: The Virgin Recordings 1973 - 1979 (2019)	Pilots of Purple Twilight: The Virgin Recordings 1980 - 1983 (2020)

In Search of Hades: The Virgin Recordings 1973 - 1979 is a deluxe 2019 18-disc compilation box set by Tangerine Dream. It consists of 16-CDs covering the albums Phaedra (1974), Rubycon (1975), Ricochet (1975), Stratosfear (1976), Encore (1977), Cyclone (1978), and Force Majeure (1979); and two Blu-ray discs of 5.1 surround sound mixes and concert footage.

The set was followed by Pilots of Purple Twilight: The Virgin Recordings 1980 - 1983 in 2020.

== Overview ==
In Search of Hades: The Virgin Recordings 1973 - 1979 includes:

- Phaedra (1974)
  - Plus two discs of outtakes, single edits, and B-sides; new stereo mix of two tracks: “Phaedra” and “Sequent C’” by Steven Wilson.
- Oedipus Tyrannus (1974) (previously unreleased soundtrack to a theatrical play, mixed by Wilson)
- Victoria Palace Concert (1974)
- Live at the Rainbow (1974) (with introduction by John Peel.)
- Rubycon (1975) (includes the bonus track “Rubycon (extended introduction)” mixed by Wilson.)
- Royal Albert Hall Concert (1975) (with introduction by John Peel.)
- Ricochet (1975) (new stereo mix by Wilson)
- Stratosfear (1976)
- Encore (1977)
- Cyclone (1978)
- Force Majeure (1979)

The box set also includes two BDs containing 5.1 surround sound mixes of Phaedra, Oedipus Tyrannus, and Ricochet by Steven Wilson and previously unreleased concert footage. The set also has a 68-page hardback book with never-before-seen photos.

The Phaedra portion of the set: Phaedra, Oedipus Tyrannus, the Victoria Palace concert, outtakes and surround mixes were released as a 50th anniversary box set edition of Phaedra in April 2025.

== Personnel ==
- Edgar Froese – Mellotron, guitar, bass, VCS 3 synthesizer, organ, gong, grand piano, mouth organ, ARP Omni, Oberheim Four Voice, Palm Products GmbH 1020, Projekt Elektronik sequencer.
- Christopher Franke – Moog synthesizer, VCS 3 synthesizer, Synthi A, organ, modified Elka organ and prepared piano, gong, organ, drums, harpsichord, ARP Pro Soloist, Elka Rhapsody 610 string machine, Oberheim OB-1, electronic percussion, Projekt Elektronik sequencer, Computerstudio digital sequencer, Oberheim sequencer.
- Peter Baumann – organ, electric piano, VCS 3 synthesizer, recorder, Synthi A, electric piano, voice, ARP 2600, flute, Projekt Elektronik rhythm computer, ARP Pro Soloist, ELKA Rhapsody 610 string machine, EMS Vocoder, Projekt Elektronik Modular Synthesizer, Projekt Elektronik sequencer.
- Steve Jolliffe – vocals, flute, piccolo, cor anglais, bass clarinet, Hohner clavinet, synthesizers, grand piano, Fender Rhodes, electric violin, tenor horns, soprano horns, Lyricon.
- Klaus Krüger – polyester custom-built drums with multi-trigger unit, electronic drum, Paiste cymbals, bubims, Burma gong set.
