= Tangerine Tree =

Tangerine Tree was a fan project operating from 2002 through 2006 with the goal of collecting, preserving and distributing unreleased concerts and other audio material by the band Tangerine Dream. The creators of the Tangerine Tree project received permission from Tangerine Dream to release the collection on a strict non-profit basis. Several of the Tangerine Tree volumes have been used as the basis for official Tangerine Dream releases. The project collected just under 300 hours of material (291:39:26).

Material was collected from audience recordings, soundboard recordings, recordings of radio and TV transmissions and in some cases the purchase of studio masters. Only recordings of a high quality and a unique nature were considered for the core Tangerine Tree volumes. These recordings were professionally re-mastered and released on CD-R and accompanied by high quality artwork for the CD labels and case liners.

Tangerine Leaves releases were based on material that did not meet the quality standards of the Tangerine Tree or from concerts that were not considered notable among a series of concerts. If a better source was found, a Tangerine Leaves volume might have been deprecated and replaced by a Tangerine Tree volume. Starting from 1980, the music played during each of the shows in a single Tangerine Dream concert tour were very similar, so it was impractical to release many volumes of the Tangerine Tree with similar content.

Audio DVD Tree volumes consisted of about two sets of the Tangerine Tree volumes on a DVD that played to a slideshow of the CD artwork. These releases were standard DVDs with a menu structure and were available in both PAL and NTSC versions.

== History ==
For almost four decades, much of this material had been traded on an informal basis and many were sold as bootlegs. Much was unidentified, misidentified, low quality and/or a multiple generation copy. Tapes were starting to degrade, as many were as much as forty years old. In the late 1990s, several collectors created the Digital Tape Tree project and distributed the material on CD-R. Collector Heiko Heerssen received permission from Tangerine Dream as long as there was no commercial gains from the project and on 9 January 2002 began to make appeals on the Tangerine Dream discussion group to gather all of the material together and create a formal project that would use the best available sources to provide the definitive version of each recording. A large number of previously unknown recordings were discovered and included in the project. All of the Digital Tape Tree volumes were replaced by later Tangerine Tree or Tangerine Leaves volumes.

In September 2002, before Tangerine Tree set three was released, an interim Classic Tree was established for distributing copies of non-remastered already-circulating bootlegs. All of the concerts used in the Classic Tree were subsequently released as Tangerine Tree volumes in superior quality, rendering the Classic Tree volumes and the bootlegs they represented obsolete.

When new sets were released, standard audio versions on CD-R were traded by signing up on the project home page on a "blanks and stamps" basis where the only actual trade was of blank CDs and shipping. To reduce the number of CDs involved in the trade, the audio tracks were compressed using the shorten lossless compression format.

The Tangerine Tree project was discontinued on 17 October 2006 by Heiko Heerssen due to legal concerns and personal reasons. Releases now can be easily found on the Internet and most reputable trading sites will post those that have not been converted to official releases.

== Live concerts by date ==
=== 1968–1974 ===
	Volume	Date	Venue Notes	Run time
Tangerine Tree	59.1	29 September 1968	Essen, Grugahalle, Germany (It is doubtful that this recording is really from this date, or is even by Tangerine Dream at all)	0:34:56
Tangerine Leaves	36	19 June 1971	Goethe University Frankfurt, Germany	0:42:14
Tangerine Tree	59.2	26 June 1971	Ossiach World Music Festival, Austria; TD: "Oszillator Planet Concert" from Ossiach Live (1971)	0:08:04
Tangerine Tree	52	25 November 1972	Klangwald Cologne WDR Sendesaal, Germany; TD: Zeit (2011)	1:18:02
Tangerine Leaves	17	20 May 1973	Les Ponts-de-Cé Open Air Festival, France	1:25:07
Tangerine Leaves	73	20 November 1973	Alhambra Theatre Saint-Ouen, France	1:33:38
Tangerine Tree	23	29 November 1973	Berlin, Deutschlandhalle, Germany; TD: Atem (2011)	0:40:13
Tangerine Tree	2r	29 October 1974	Sheffield City Hall, England; TD: Bootleg Box 1: Sheffield 74	0:43:39
Tangerine Leaves	52	20 November 1974	Glasgow, Kelvin Hall, Scotland	1:26:07
Tangerine Leaves	47	26 November 1974	Bradford, St. George's Hall, England	0:47:14
Tangerine Tree	30	13 December 1974	Reims Cathedral, France; Replaces Classic Tree 1	1:24:09

=== 1975 Australian Tour & London show, with line-up of Froese, Franke, Michael Hoenig ===
	Volume	Date	Venue Notes	Run time
Tangerine Tree	77	13 March 1975	Melbourne, Dallas Brooks Hall, Australia	1:24:00
Tangerine Leaves	20	25 March 1975	Adelaide, Festival Theatre, Australia	1:26:34
Tangerine Tree	9	2 April 1975	London, Royal Albert Hall, England; TD: Bootleg Box 1: London 1975	2:02:31

=== 1975 France and U.K. Tours — Ricochet ===
Ricochet is a composite "live" album, produced from hours of audio tape recorded during the French and British tours. The only definitively identified source is "Ricochet, Part Two" from the 23 October 1975 concert at Croydon Fairfield Halls.

	Volume	Date	Venue Notes	Run time
Tangerine Tree	22	16 August 1975	Orange Theatre Antique, France	0:57:14
Tangerine Leaves	70	14 September 1975	Fête de l'Humanité, Paris, France	1:12:44
Tangerine Leaves	67	23 September 1975	Reims Opera, France	1:11:02
Tangerine Leaves	6	4 October 1975	Coventry Cathedral, England	1:29:29
Tangerine Leaves	15	16 October 1975	Liverpool Cathedral, England	1:36:52
Tangerine Leaves	81	17 October 1975	Glasgow City Hall, Scotland	1:14:10
Tangerine Leaves	38	19 October 1975	Manchester, Hardrock, England	1:24:02
Tangerine Leaves	3	20 October 1975	York, Minster Cathedral, England	1:19:35
Tangerine Tree	7	23 October 1975	Croydon, Fairfield Halls, England; TD: Bootleg Box 1: Croydon 1975	1:01:34

=== 1976 European Tours ===
	Volume	Date	Venue Notes	Run time
Tangerine Tree	13.2	24 January 1976	Saarbrücken, Saarland University, Germany	1:00:05
Tangerine Leaves	68	26 January 1976	Hippodrome Paris, France	1:21:05
Tangerine Tree	6	31 January 1976	Bilbao, Pabellón de la Casilla, Spain; TD: Bootleg Box 1: Bilbao 1976	1:54:21
Tangerine Tree	27	9 February 1976	Brussels, Auditorium Paul-Emile Janson, Université libre de Bruxelles, Belgium	1:38:59
Tangerine Tree	55	11 February 1976	RAI Congress Centrum, Amsterdam, Netherlands	1:44:44
Tangerine Tree	47	5 June 1976	Manchester, Palace Theatre, England	1:48:43
Tangerine Tree	34	7 June 1976	London, Royal Albert Hall, England	1:32:24
Tangerine Tree	81	10 June 1976	Brighton, The Dome, England	1:19:47
Tangerine Tree	8r	27 June 1976	Berlin, Philharmonics, Germany; TD: Bootleg Box 1: Electronic Rock at the Phiharmonics; TD: Soundmill Navigator (re-mixed)	0:31:15

=== 1976 European Tour — Stratosfear ===
	Volume	Date	Venue Notes	Run time
Tangerine Leaves	64	20 October 1976	Hanover, Stadthalle, Germany	1:12:34
Tangerine Tree	45	21 October 1976	Düsseldorf, Philipshalle, Germany	1:32:35
Tangerine Leaves	46	27 October 1976	Munich, Cirkus Krone Bau, Germany	1:31:57
Tangerine Leaves	40	29 October 1976	Mainz, Elzer Hof, Germany	1:03:07
Tangerine Tree	13.1	31 October 1976	Mannheim, Mozart Saal, Germany	1:21:30
Tangerine Tree	1r	8 November 1976	Nottingham, Albert Hall, England; TD: Bootleg Box 2: Nottingham 1976	1:19:41
Tangerine Leaves	16	9 November 1976	Portsmouth, Guild Hall, England	1:07:09
Tangerine Leaves	18	12 November 1976	Birmingham, Odeon, England	1:18:30
Tangerine Leaves	62	13 November 1976	Leeds, University, England	1:19:55
Tangerine Leaves	23	14 November 1976	Croydon, Fairfield Halls, England	1:17:32
Tangerine Tree	31r	16 November 1976	Brussels, Ancienne Belgique, Belgium	1:04:11
Tangerine Tree	19	22 November 1976	Paris, Palais du Sport, France	1:53:40
Tangerine Leaves	87	26 November 1976	Barcelona, Nuevo Pabellón Deportivo, Spain	1:35:35

=== 1977 North America Tour — Encore ===
	Volume	Date	Venue Notes	Run time
Tangerine Leaves	21	29 March 1977	Milwaukee, Riverside Theatre, USA	1:11:22
Tangerine Tree	25r	31 March 1977	Detroit, Ford Auditorium, USA; TD: Bootmoon Series: Detroit– March 31st, 1977	1:39:03
Tangerine Leaves	91	1 April 1977	Chicago, Aragon Ballroom, USA	1:15:44
Tangerine Leaves	85	2 April 1977	Cleveland, Music Hall, USA	1:32:01
Tangerine Tree	4	4 April 1977	Washington, Lisner Auditorium, USA; TD: "Monolight" from Encore; Bootleg Box 2: Washington 1977	1:49:12
Tangerine Leaves	55	5 April 1977	New York, Avery Fisher Hall, USA	1:18:07
Tangerine Leaves	57	8 April 1977	Toronto, Convocation Hall, Canada	1:19:55
Tangerine Tree	18	9 April 1977	Montreal, Place des Arts, Canada; TD: Bootmoon Series: Montreal– April 9th, 1977	1:54:46
Tangerine Leaves	32	11 April 1977	Quebec, Hilton Convention Center, Canada	1:19:51
Tangerine Tree	39	21 April 1977	Seattle, Paramount Theatre. USA	1:08:39
Tangerine Tree	66	26 April 1977	Santa Monica, Civic Auditorium, USA	1:44:23

=== 1978 European Tour — Cyclone ===
	Volume	Date	Venue Notes	Run time
Tangerine Tree	67	19 February 1978	Berlin, Eissporthalle, Germany	2:08:21
Tangerine Tree	11	24 February 1978	Hamburg, Audimax, Germany; TD: Bootleg Box 2: Hamburg 1978	0:52:40
Tangerine Leaves	30	25 February 1978	Düsseldorf, Philipshalle, Germany	1:28:44
Tangerine Leaves	39	1 March 1978	Nantes, Palais de la Beaujoire, France	1:50:44
Tangerine Leaves	5	17 March 1978	Brussels, Cirque Royale, Belgium	1:33:43
Tangerine Tree	91	19 March 1978	Oxford, New Theatre, England	1:01:36
Tangerine Leaves	50	20 March 1978	London, Hammersmith Odeon, England	1:56:31
Tangerine (neither Tree nor Leaf!)	Never released	23 March 1978	Newcastle, City Hall, England	1:29:29
Tangerine Leaves	86	24 March 1978	Glasgow Apollo, Scotland	1:47:37
Tangerine Leaves	60	25 March 1978	Manchester, City Hall, England	1:03:19
Tangerine Leaves	75	26 March 1978	Empire Liverpool, England	0:20:33
Tangerine Tree	92	28 March 1978	London, Hammersmith Odeon, England	1:58:29

=== 1980 East Berlin — Pergamon ===
	Volume	Date	Venue Notes	Run time
Tangerine Tree	17r	31 January 1980	East Berlin, Palace of the Republic, Germany; Second of two concerts on this day TD: Quichotte (1980), Pergamon (1986).	1:45:14

=== 1980 European Tour — Thief ===
	Volume	Date	Venue Notes	Run time
Tangerine Tree	26	13 October 1980	Brussels Cirque Royal, Belgium	1:40:51
Tangerine Leaves	54	16 October 1980	Hamburg, Congress Centrum, Germany	1:46:39
Tangerine Leaves	45	17 October 1980	Luxembourg, Centre Culturelle, Luxemburg	0:50:05
Tangerine Leaves	82	20 October 1980	Bologna, Palasport, Italy	1:43:31
Tangerine Leaves	8	1 November 1980	Dublin, National Stadium, Ireland	1:45:28
Tangerine Tree	62	5 November 1980	Preston, Guild Hall, England; TD: Bootmoon Series: Preston– November 5th, 1980	1:49:11
Tangerine Leaves	78	15 November 1980	Royal Court Liverpool, England	2:30:33
Tangerine Leaves	61	22 November 1980	Santa Monica, Civic Auditorium, USA	1:43:17

=== 1981 European Tour ===
	Volume	Date	Venue Notes	Run time
Tangerine Leaves	7	21 January 1981	Aachen, Eurogress, Germany; TD: Bootmoon Series: Aachen– January 21st, 1981	1:47:39
Tangerine Tree	56.1	26 January 1981	Berlin, ICC, Germany	1:21:12
Tangerine Tree	14	2 February 1981	Paris, Bataclan, France; TD: Bootmoon Series: Paris– February 2nd, 1981	1:44:30
Tangerine Leaves	35	6 February 1981	Rome, Palazzetto dello Sport, Italy	1:19:16
Tangerine Leaves	24	7 February 1981	Cantù, Palasport Piarelli, Italy	1:27:02
Tangerine Tree	28	8 February 1981	Florence, Teatro Tenda, Italy	1:26:29
Tangerine Tree	53	29 August 1981	Berlin, Reichstagsgelaende, Germany	1:35:44

=== 1981 British Tour — Exit ===
	Volume	Date	Venue Notes	Run time
Tangerine Tree	78	15 October 1981	Oxford, New Theatre, England	1:32:06
Tangerine Leaves	79	16 October 1981	Portsmouth, Guild Hall, England	1:32:47
Tangerine Leaves	14	17 October 1981	Brighton, Dome, England	1:32:28
Tangerine Tree	89	20 October 1981	London, Hammersmith Odeon, England	1:52:24
Tangerine Tree	10r	25 October 1981	Newcastle City Hall, England; TD: Bootleg Box 2: Newcastle 1981 (TT10r replaces only disc 2 of TT10)	1:50:27
Tangerine Leaves	9n	26 October 1981	Edinburgh, Usher Hall, Scotland	1:49:38
Tangerine Tree	56.2	11 November 1981	Gelsenkirchen, Germany	0:26:01

=== 1982 Australian Tour ===
	Volume	Date	Venue Notes	Run time
Tangerine Tree	37r	22 February 1982	Sydney, Regent Theatre, Australia; TD: Bootmoon Series: Sydney– February 22nd, 1982; TD: Sohoman (re-mixed); Replaces Classic Tree 2	1:46:04
Tangerine Tree	48	1 March 1982	Melbourne, Dallas Brooks Hall, Australia; Replaces Classic Tree 3	1:00:27

=== 1982 European Tour — White Eagle, Logos ===
	Volume	Date	Venue Notes	Run time
Tangerine Tree	87	19 October 1982	Budapest, Sportcsarnok, Hungary	1:08:24
Tangerine Leaves	34	27 October 1982	Frankfurt, Alte Oper, Germany	1:44:03
Tangerine Leaves	59	30 October 1982	Derby, Assembly Rooms, England	1:34:42
Tangerine Tree	12r	31 October 1982	Croydon, Fairfield Halls, England	1:50:14
Tangerine Leaves	84	1 November 1982	Manchester, Apollo Theatre, England	1:47:09
Tangerine Leaves	1	6 November 1982	London, Dominion Theatre, England; TD: Logos Live	1:56:43
Tangerine Leaves	43	8 November 1982	Brussels, Vrije University, Belgium	1:48:02
Tangerine Leaves	22	11 November 1982	Düsseldorf, Philipshalle, Germany	1:28:30
Tangerine Tree	61	15 November 1982	Berlin, Internationales Congress Centrum, Germany; Replaces Classic Tree 4	1:28:15

=== 1983 Japanese Tour ===
	Volume	Date	Venue Notes	Run time
Tangerine Tree	5	11 June 1983	Frankfurt, Alte Oper, Germany; TD: Bootleg Box 2: Fassbinder	0:38:05
Tangerine Tree	40	23 June 1983	Tokyo, Nakano Sun Plaza, Japan	1:43:01
Tangerine Tree	72	25 June 1983	Tokyo, Nakano Sun Plaza, Japan	1:35:28
Tangerine Tree	64	28 June 1983	Osaka, Festival Hall, Japan	1:45:20

=== 1983 European Tour ===
	Volume	Date	Venue Notes	Run time
Tangerine Tree	83	30 August 1983	Athens, Lycabettus Theatre, Greece	1:13:12
Tangerine Leaves	13	26 November 1983	Dresden, Deutsches Hygiene-Museum, Germany	1:42:26

=== 1986 European Tour — Underwater Sunlight ===
	Volume	Date	Venue Notes	Run time
Tangerine Tree	35	17 March 1986	Birmingham, Odeon, England	1:51:44
Tangerine Leaves	28	21 March 1986	Harrogate, Conference Centre, England	1:38:14
Tangerine Leaves	25	26 March 1986	Oxford, Apollo Theatre, England	1:46:21
Tangerine Leaves	53	29 March 1986	Cologne, WDR Sendesaal, Germany (Audience recording, complete)	1:39:05
Tangerine Tree	58	29 March 1986	Cologne, WDR Sendesaal, Germany (FM broadcast, incomplete)	1:00:16
Tangerine Tree	69	31 March 1986	Paris, Olympique, France	1:17:09

=== 1986 North American Tour — Underwater Sunlight ===
	Volume	Date	Venue Notes	Run time
Tangerine Leaves	63	1 June 1986	Portland, Arlene Schnitzer Concert Hall, USA	1:44:01
Tangerine Tree	24	6 June 1986	Laguna Hills, Irvine Meadows Amphitheater, USA	1:46:52
Tangerine Leaves	80	11 June 1986	Denver, Paramount Theater, USA	1:42:10
Tangerine Tree	68	19 June 1986	Montreal, Place des Arts, Canada	1:55:12
Tangerine Leaves	12	20 June 1986	Ottawa, National Arts Centre, Canada; TD: Bootmoon Series: Ottawa– June 20th, 1986	1:45:54
Tangerine Tree	44	21 June 1986	Toronto, Massey Hall, Canada	1:54:13
Tangerine Leaves	42	27 June 1986	Providence Performing Arts Center, USA	1:38:22
Tangerine Leaves	72	29 June 1986	Warner Theater, Washington, USA	1:47:02

=== 1987 ===
	Volume	Date	Venue Notes	Run time
Tangerine Tree	38	1 August 1987	Berlin, Reichstagsgelaende, Germany; Replaces Classic Tree 6.1; Replaces Classic Tree 7	2:05:44

=== 1988 North American Tour — Optical Race ===
	Volume	Date	Venue Notes	Run time
Tangerine Leaves	19	25 August 1988	Chicago, Hoffman Estates Poplar Creek Music Center, USA	1:33:10
Tangerine Leaves	56	26 August 1988	Milwaukee, Riverside Theater, USA	1:30:02
Tangerine Leaves	69	29 August 1988	Columbus, Ohio Theatre, USA	1:48:38
Tangerine Leaves	4	1 September 1988	Toronto, Massey Hall, Canada	1:57:57
Tangerine Tree	85	7 September 1988	New York, Radio City Music Hall	1:53:37
Tangerine Tree	42	9 September 1988	New Haven, Palace Theatre, USA	1:51:08
Tangerine Leaves	88	14 September 1988	Sarasota, Van Wezel Performing Arts Hall, USA	1:58:35
Tangerine Leaves	48	16 September 1988	New Orleans, Saenger Theatre, USA	1:42:57
Tangerine Leaves	31	23 September 1988	Los Angeles, Wiltern Theatre, USA	1:32:28

=== 1990 ===
	Volume	Date	Venue Notes	Run time
Tangerine Tree	49r	20 February 1990	Berlin, Werner-Seelenbinder-Halle, Germany; TD: East, East Bonus CD	1:29:33

=== 1990 British Tour — Melrose ===
	Volume	Date	Venue Notes	Run time
Tangerine Leaves	90	25 October 1990	Worthing, Assembly Hall, England	1:53:23
Tangerine Tree	29	26 October 1990	London, Hammersmith Odeon, England	1:57:44
Tangerine Leaves	51	27 October 1990	London, Hammersmith Odeon, England	1:40:35
Tangerine Leaves	77	28 October 1990	Apollo Theatre, Manchester, England	1:59:39
Tangerine Leaves	29	29 October 1990	Nottingham, Royal Centre, England	1:47:49
Tangerine Tree	90	1 November 1990	Newcastle City Hall, England	1:34:52
Tangerine Tree	84	4 November 1990	Oxford, Apollo Theatre, England	1:48:05
Tangerine Tree	70	6 November 1990	Bristol, Colston Hall, England; Replaces Classic Tree 6.2	1:47:31

=== 1992 North American Tour — 220 Volt ===
	Volume	Date	Venue Notes	Run time
Tangerine Leaves	89	9 October 1992	New York, Beacon Theatre, USA	2:01:53
Tangerine Leaves	44	17 October 1992	Chicago, Old Vic Theater, USA	1:59:41
Tangerine Tree	21	20 October 1992	Detroit, Fox Theater, USA	2:02:33
Tangerine Tree	76	25 October 1992	Seattle, Paramount Theater, USA	2:02:28
Tangerine Leaves	58	28 October 1992	San Juan Capistrano, The Coach House, USA	1:58:58
Tangerine Leaves	33	1 November 1992	Ventura, Ventura Theater, USA	2:03:19

=== 1995 ===
	Volume	Date	Venue Notes	Run time
Tangerine Tree	57	12 July 1995	Los Angeles, SIR Theatre, USA	0:43:39

=== 1996–1997 — Tournado ===
	Volume	Date	Venue Notes	Run time
Tangerine Leaves	10 & 11	30 September 1996	London, Shepherd's Bush Empire, England	3:11:31
Tangerine Leaves	83	11 April 1997	Bonn, Beethovenhalle, Germany	2:33:35
Tangerine Tree	82	12 April 1997	Munich, Cirkus-Krone Bau, Germany	2:32:40
Tangerine Tree	46	20 April 1997	Amsterdam, Melkweg Max, Netherlands	2:32:40
Tangerine Leaves	41.1	22 April 1997	Budapest, Petofi Csarnok, Hungary	1:07:12
Tangerine Leaves	41.2	23 April 1997	Zabrze, Dom Muzyki i Tanca, Poland; TD: Tournado	1:22:32
Tangerine Tree	20	13 June 1997	Warsaw, Sala Kongresowa, Poland	1:07:25

=== 1997 UK tour ===
	Volume	Date	Venue Notes	Run time
Tangerine Tree	65	1 November 1997	Glasgow, Royal Concert Hall, Scotland	1:52:34
Tangerine Leaves	65	4 November 1997	Manchester, Apollo Theatre, England	2:29:21
Tangerine Leaves	71	6 November 1997	Shepherd's Bush Empire, London, England; TD: Valentine Wheels	2:29:19

=== 1999–2005 ===
	Volume	Date	Venue Notes	Run time
Tangerine Tree	43	12 June 1999	Osnabrück, Stadthalle, Germany	1:59:06
Tangerine Leaves	26 & 27	12 May 2001	London, Shepherd's Bush Empire, England	2:45:11
Tangerine Tree	15 & 16	31 August 2001	Most Beautiful Rock for Peace, Warsaw, Poland	3:01:29
Tangerine Tree	3	7 October 2001	Bernau bei Berlin, St. Marien-Kirche, Germany; TD: Inferno	1:18:39
Tangerine Leaves	2	24 August 2002	Burg Nideggen, Germany (Inferno)	1:18:37
Tangerine Tree	32 & 33	15 February 2003	London, Astoria Theatre, England	2:41:08
Tangerine Tree	60	6 March 2004	London, Royal Festival Hall, England; TD: Purgatorio	2:15:35
Tangerine Leaves	37	25 April 2004	Barcelona, Sala Bikini, Spain	1:55:58
Tangerine Tree	74 & 75	11 June 2005	London, Shepherd's Bush Empire, England	2:46:15
Tangerine Leaves	76	8 July 2005	Berlin, Friedrichstadtkirche, Germany	1:15:55
Tangerine Tree	79 & 79r	9 July 2005	Berlin, Friedrichstadtkirche, Germany (TT79r replaces only disc 2 of TT79); TD: Jeanne d'Arc	1:45:39
Tangerine Leaves	74	14 October 2005	Philharmonie Essen, Germany	2:04:45

=== Notes ===
- "r" indicates a volume or part of a volume re-released in a later set, generally because a higher quality or more complete source was found.
- "n" indicates a new volume that completely replaced an older volume that was deprecated.
  - After Tangerine Leaves 9 was released in set 1, a better recording was found and it was replaced by Tangerine Tree 53. Tangerine Leaves set 5 released a different concert as Tangerine Leaves 9 to fill in the gap.
- "TD" indicates official Tangerine Dream releases.
- Decimals indicate volumes that have been split because they contain multiple concerts. For example, Tangerine Tree 59 consists of two concerts in one volume and is split as 59.1 and 59.2.
- Concerts split across multiple volumes, such as Tangerine Leaves 10 and 11, are listed on one line.

== Other releases ==
Other volumes are mixed collections of tracks from various concerts, films, radio interviews and unlabeled volumes.

	Volume	Date	Title	Run time
Tangerine Tree	36	1969–2001		2:26:45
Tangerine Tree	50	1981–2003	Assorted Secrets 2	1:18:39
Tangerine Tree	63	1980–1991	Assorted Secrets 3	1:18:39
Tangerine Tree	80	1979–1990	Assorted Secrets 4	0:56:09
Tangerine Tree	88	1968–2006	Assorted Secrets 5	2:19:14
Tangerine Tree	71	1971–1981	Adventures in LoFi 1971–1981	3:10:47
Tangerine Tree	41	1973–1976	Space is the Place; TD: "Overture" from V (1975)	2:31:32
Tangerine Leaves	49		A Blast From The Past	2:21:45
Tangerine Tree	51		On Air	0:53:46
Tangerine Tree	54		The Keep: An Alternative View	1:16:34
Tangerine Tree	73		Soundtrax; Tracks from: Vision Quest; The Switch; The Keep	1:22:21
Tangerine Leaves	66		Triple Orange Juice	2:29:13
Tangerine Tree	86	1981–1996	Soundchecks 1981–96	0:53:00

== Sets ==
Volumes were released in batch sets.

Set	Volumes	Released
Tangerine Tree 1	1–8	February 2002
Tangerine Tree 2	9–16	July 2002
Tangerine Tree 3	17–26	January 2003
Tangerine Tree 4	27–37	August 2003
Tangerine Tree 5	38–48	April 2004
Tangerine Tree 6	49–61	August 2004
Tangerine Tree 7	62–71	August 2005
Tangerine Tree 8	72–79; 1r, 2r, 10r, 25r	November 2005
Tangerine Tree 9	80–87; 8r, 12r, 37r, 79r	February 2006
Tangerine Tree 10	88–92; 17r, 31r, 49r	August 2006
Tangerine Leaves 1	1–12	May 2003
Tangerine Leaves 2	13–27	December 2003
Tangerine Leaves 3	28–40	January 2005
Tangerine Leaves 4	41–53	August 2005
Tangerine Leaves 5	9n 54–66	June 2006
Tangerine Leaves 6	67–78	February 2006
Tangerine Leaves 7	79–91	August 2006
Audio DVD Tree 1	1–16	
Audio DVD Tree 2	17–31	
Audio DVD Tree 3	32–44	
Audio DVD Tree 4	45–61	
