= Analog sequencer =

Music sequencer constructed from analog electronics

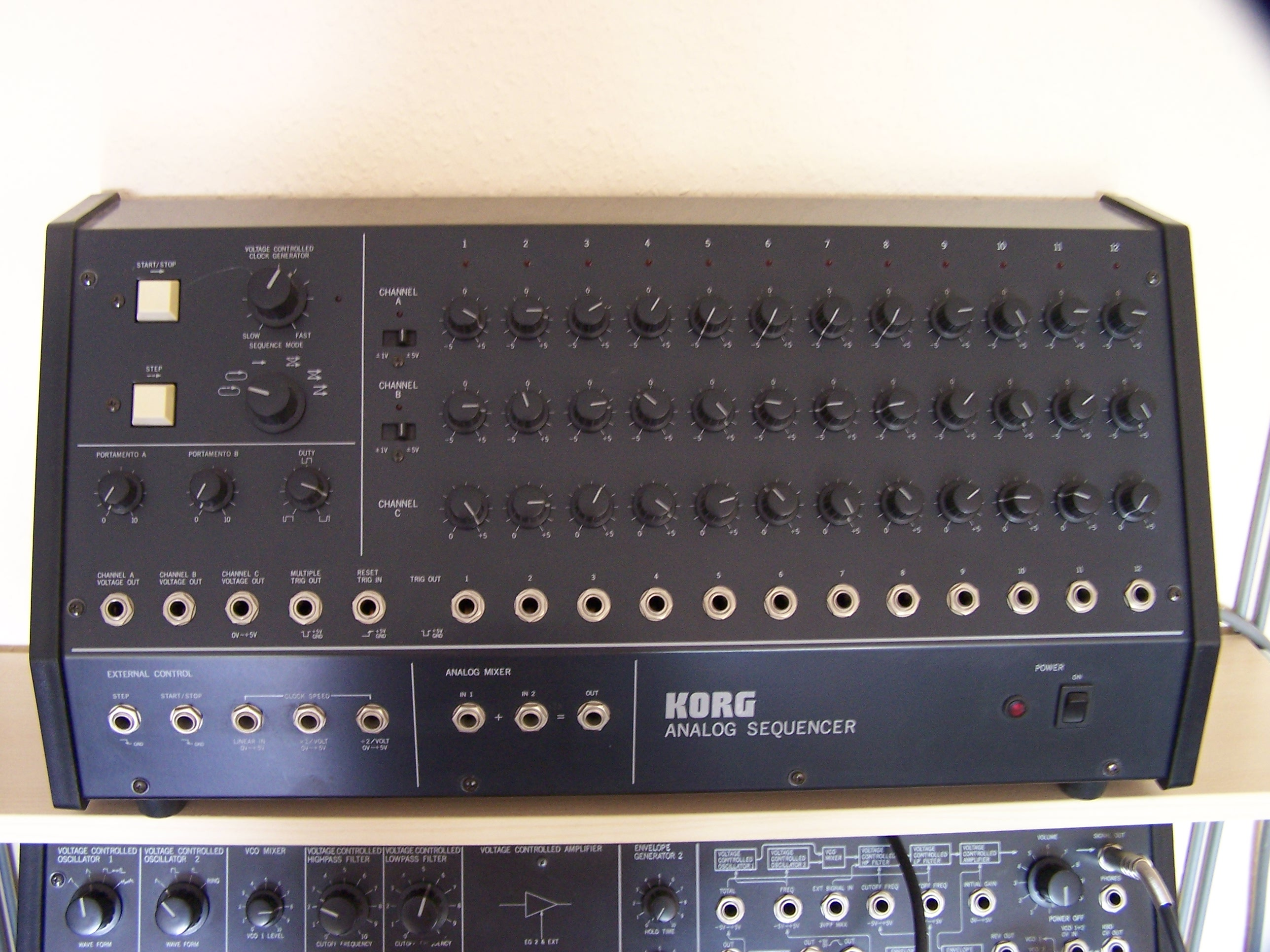
Typical analog sequencer (Korg SQ-10)

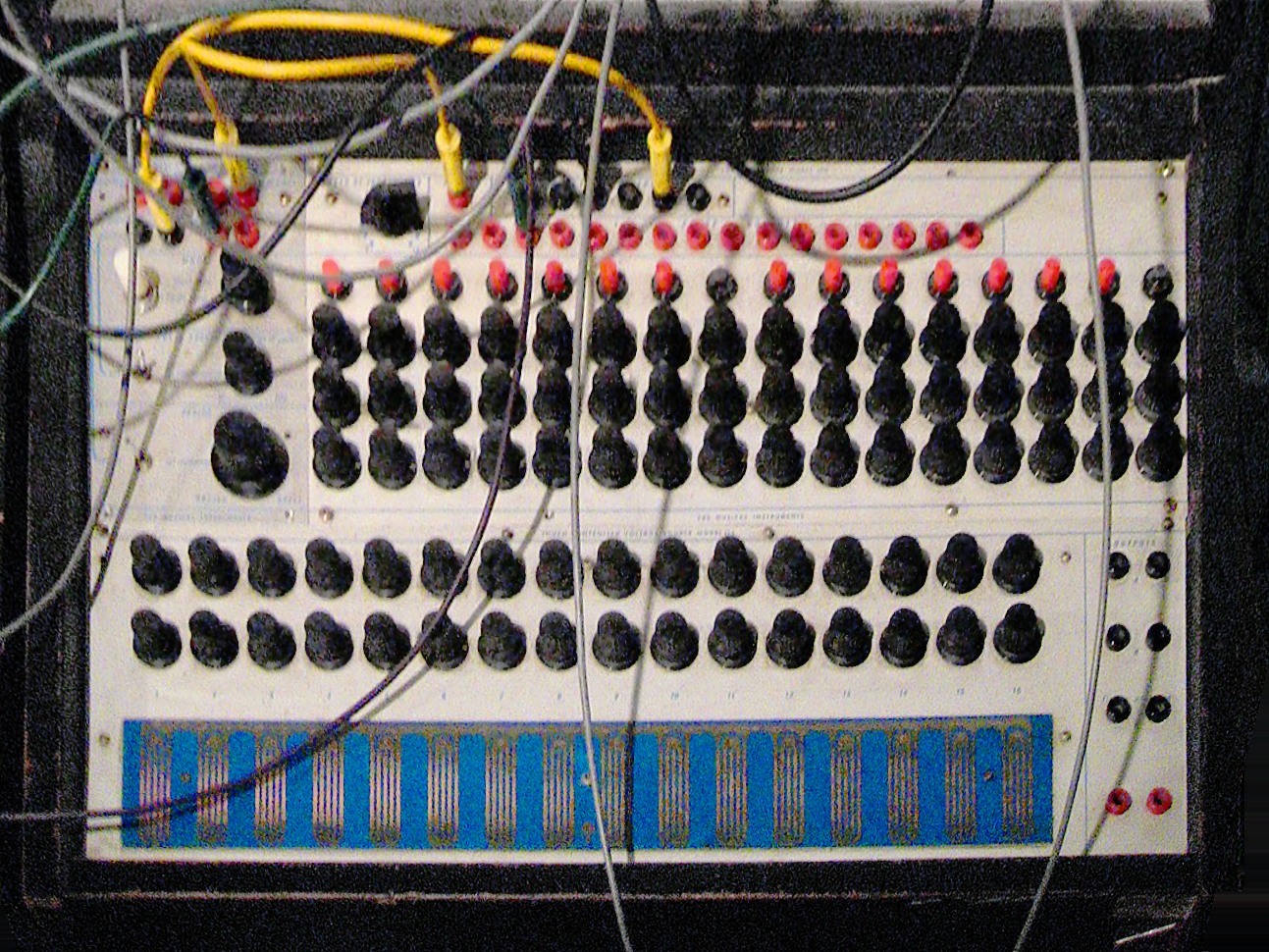
Buchla 146 Sequential Voltage Source module (16step × 3) with 114 keyboard on Buchla 100 at NYU (c. 1964).

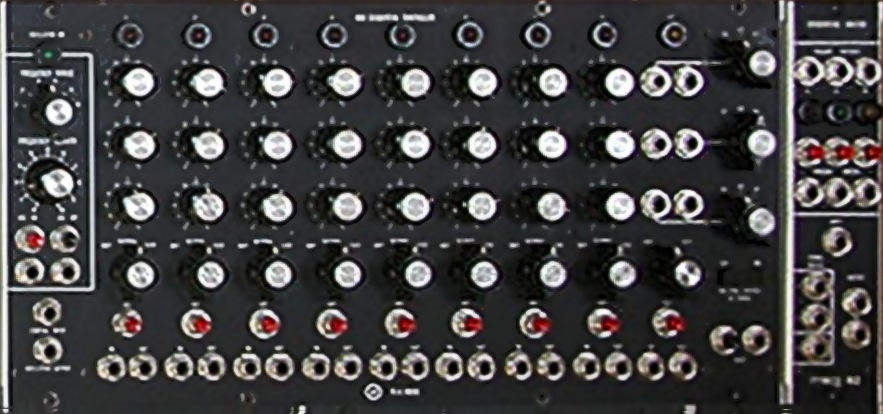
Moog 960 Sequential Controller with 962 Sequential Switch modules (1968–) on Moog Modular 55 (1972–1981)

An analog sequencer is a music sequencer constructed from analog electronics, invented in the first half of the 20th century.

Raymond Scott designed and constructed some of the first electro-mechanical music sequencers in the 1940s. The first electronic sequencer was invented by Raymond Scott, using thyratrons and relays. Incidentally in 1951, computer music was started from the music sequencing, and later its applicable fields were expanded into the music composition and sound generation. However, the RCA Mark II Sound Synthesizer in 1957 was still indirectly controlled via punch-tape system similar to piano rolls, a kind of mechanical sequencer. Also, in earlier electronic music, artists used sound-on-film technology to generate sound waves as well as control sequences of notes.

At its most basic, an analog sequencer consists of a bank of potentiometers and a "clock" (pulse generator) connected to a sequencer, which steps through these potentiometers one at a time and then cycles back to the beginning. The output from the above is fed (as a control voltage and gate pulse) to a synthesizer. By "tuning" the potentiometers, a short repetitive rhythmic motif or riff can be set up.

The most commonly used analog sequencer was the Moog 960, which was a module of the Moog modular synthesizer. It consisted of three parallel banks of eight potentiometers: the three banks could either steer three different Voltage-controlled oscillators (VCOs) to allow three-note chords in the sequence, or (for example) one row could steer pitch while the second row is patched through to the filter cutoff or VCA volume, and a third steers filter cutoff for a white noise generator (thus creating an extremely primitive electronic drum track).

Under each of the eight steps, a switch offered three options: play this step, skip this step, or loop back to the beginning. To avoid the monotony of endlessly repeated sequences, pioneering electronic musicians like Chris Franke of Tangerine Dream and Michael Hoenig would manipulate these switches in real time during performance, adding and dropping notes and beats from a sequence. Also, the "pitch" row can be patched to two or more oscillators tuned to intervals, and the oscillators mixed in and out one at a time.

Good examples of all these techniques can be heard on the Phaedra, Rubycon, Ricochet, and Encore albums of Tangerine Dream, as well as on Departure from the Northern Wasteland by Michael Hoenig.

By synchronizing two sequencers, and manipulating them individually, swirling polyrhythmic phasing patterns (as introduced in minimalist music by Steve Reich) can be set up. The title track of the Michael Hoenig album (mentioned above) is an excellent example.

An additional module (Moog 962) allowed "daisy-chaining" the three rows to form one longer 24-step sequence. In addition, a switch on the 960 itself let the third (bottom) row be used for note lengths.

The output voltage of the sequencer can be added to the output voltage of a keyboard controller, and the latter used to transpose the sequence on the fly. Klaus Schulze was particularly fond of this technique, which lays the musical foundation for tracks like "Bayreuth Return" from Timewind, "Floating" from Moondawn, and any rhythmic piece from Klaus Schulze's "analog" years. Giorgio Moroder, Vangelis and Jean-Michel Jarre likewise availed themselves of this technique.

Apart from a temperature-controlled environment after warmup, pitch stability could be problematic. On the famous opening of "Phaedra", the sequencer had drifted out of tune, and one can clearly hear Chris Franke retuning the sequence by ear in real time.

In addition to the 1027 module, which is a conventional 3x10 step sequencer, the ARP 2500 was often equipped with the 1050 Mix-Sequencer module. Unlike contemporary sequencers that only generated voltages, the 1050 could also sequence audio signals. This allowed each step of the sequence to come from a completely different sound source. The 8 positions could run in sequence or be split into two independent four-step sequencers. It's easily identified by its vertical column of 8 square white buttons that light up to indicate the active step(s).

Analog sequencers, have in some respects, been replaced by digital devices and software implementations. However, there is a continued interest by modular analog synthesists, who appreciate the real time control offered by the analog sequencer as evidenced by the "Oberkorn" machine by Analog Solutions, amongst others.

Various analog sequencers

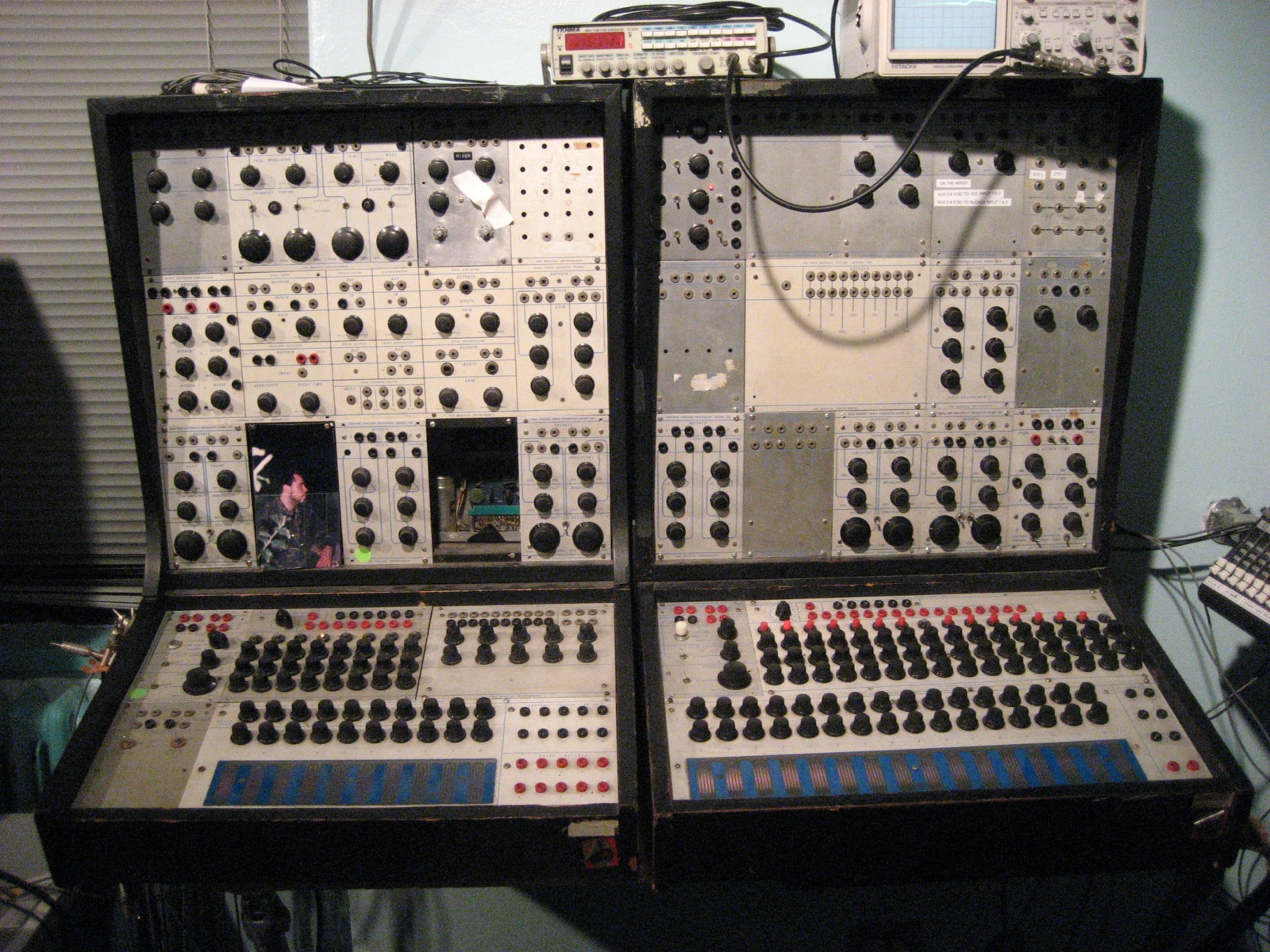
One of the first commercially available analog sequencers (bottom, 3×8-step and 3×16-step) on Buchla 100 (1964/1966)

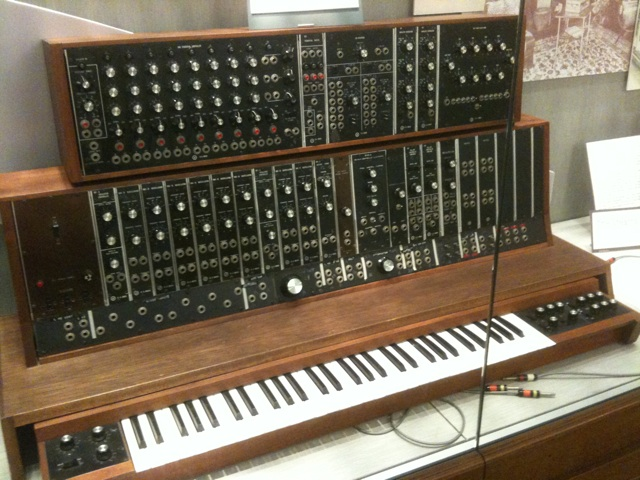
Earlier Moog sequencer (left, added after 1968) on the 1st commercially sold Moog Modular prototype (c.1964)

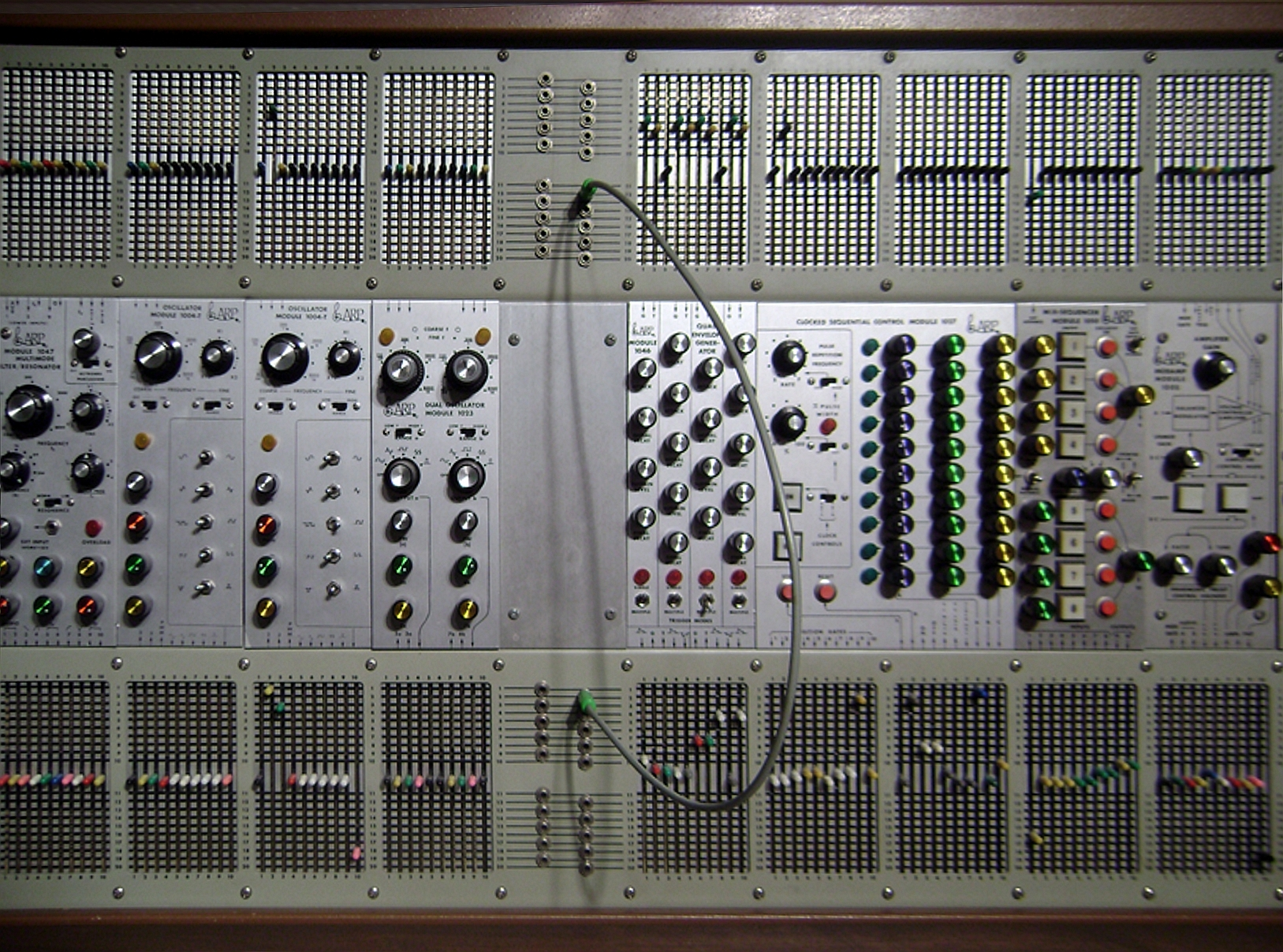
ARP 1027 Clocked Sequential Control Module (3rd&4th from right) and 1050 Mix-Sequencer module to its right on ARP 2500 (1970)

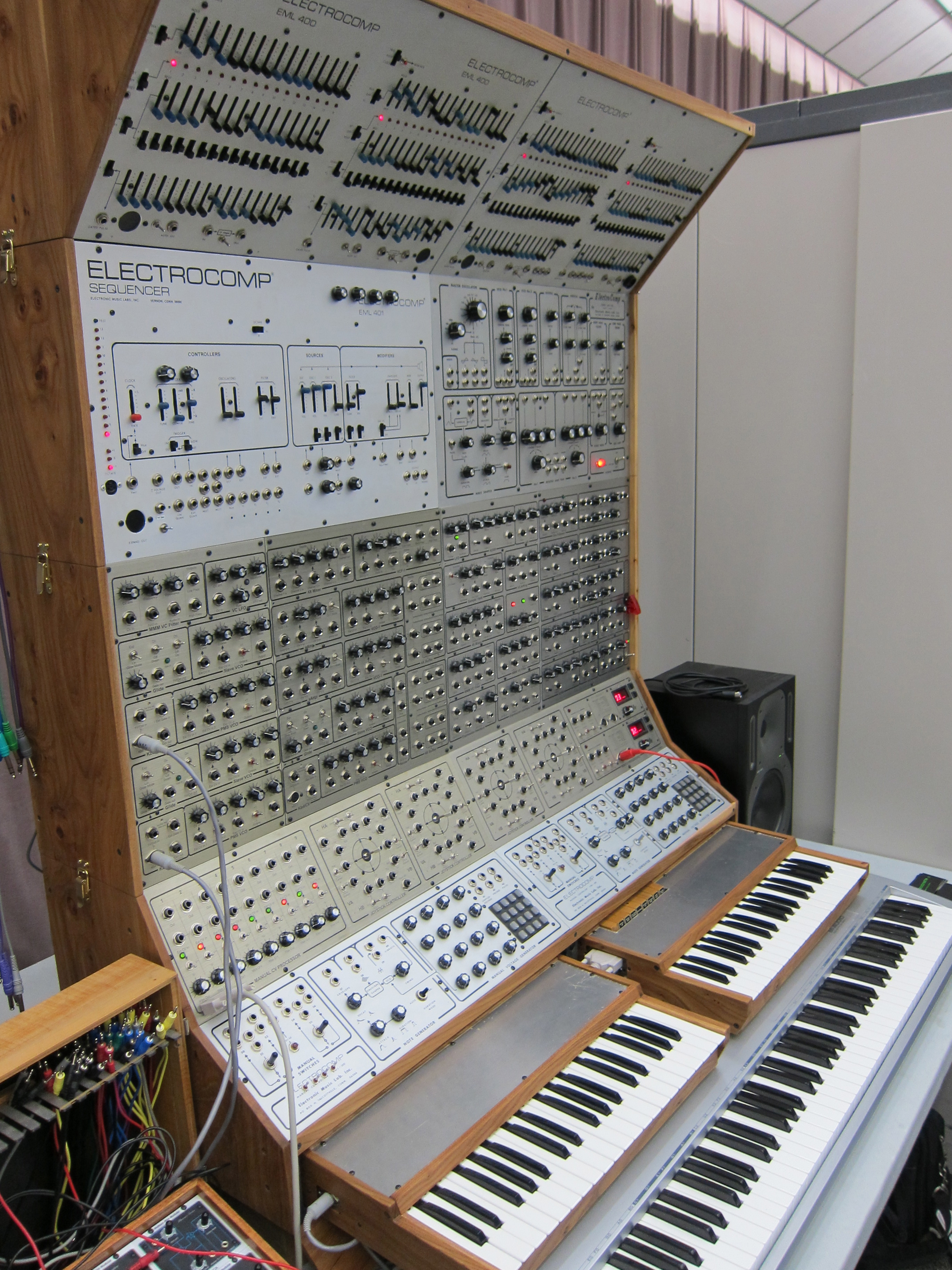
EML Sequencer 400 (top ×2, 6×16 step) on EML ElectroComp modular synthesizer (1970)

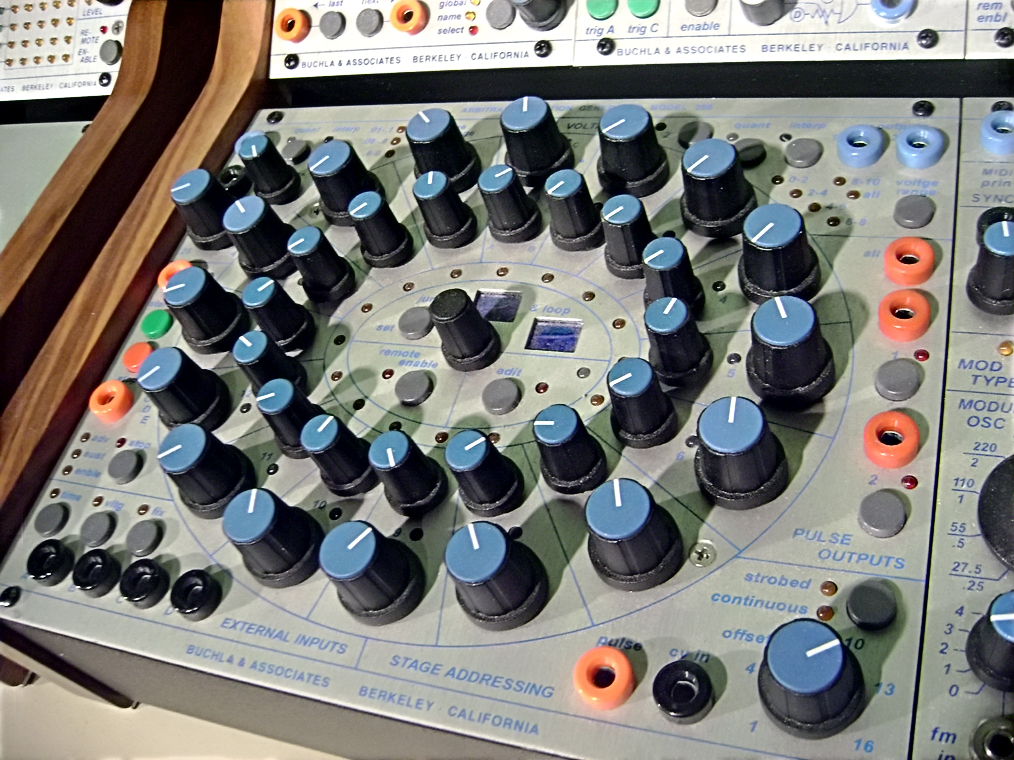
Buchla 250e Arbitrary Function Generator

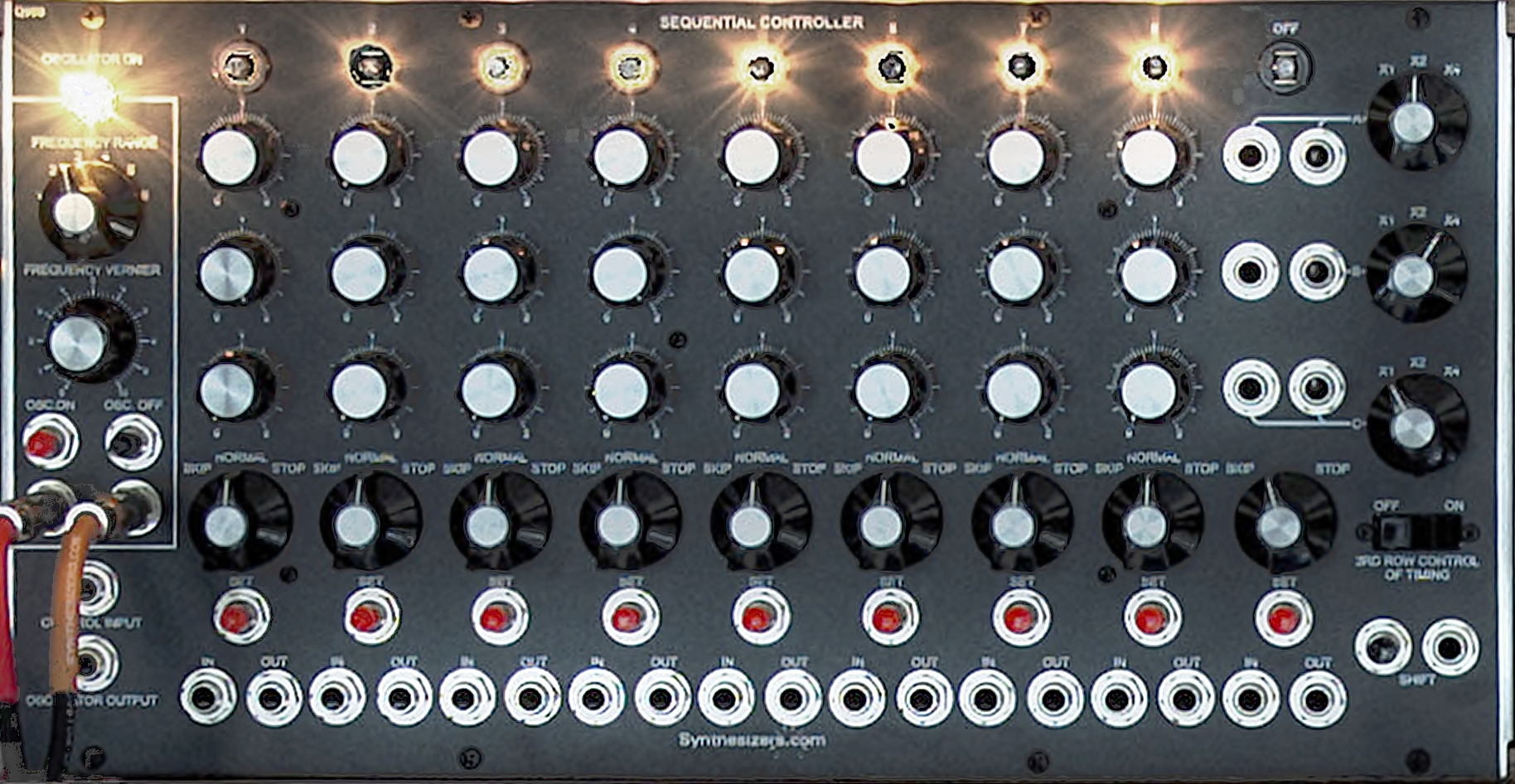
A Moog 960 clone,
Synthesizers.com Q960 Sequential Controller

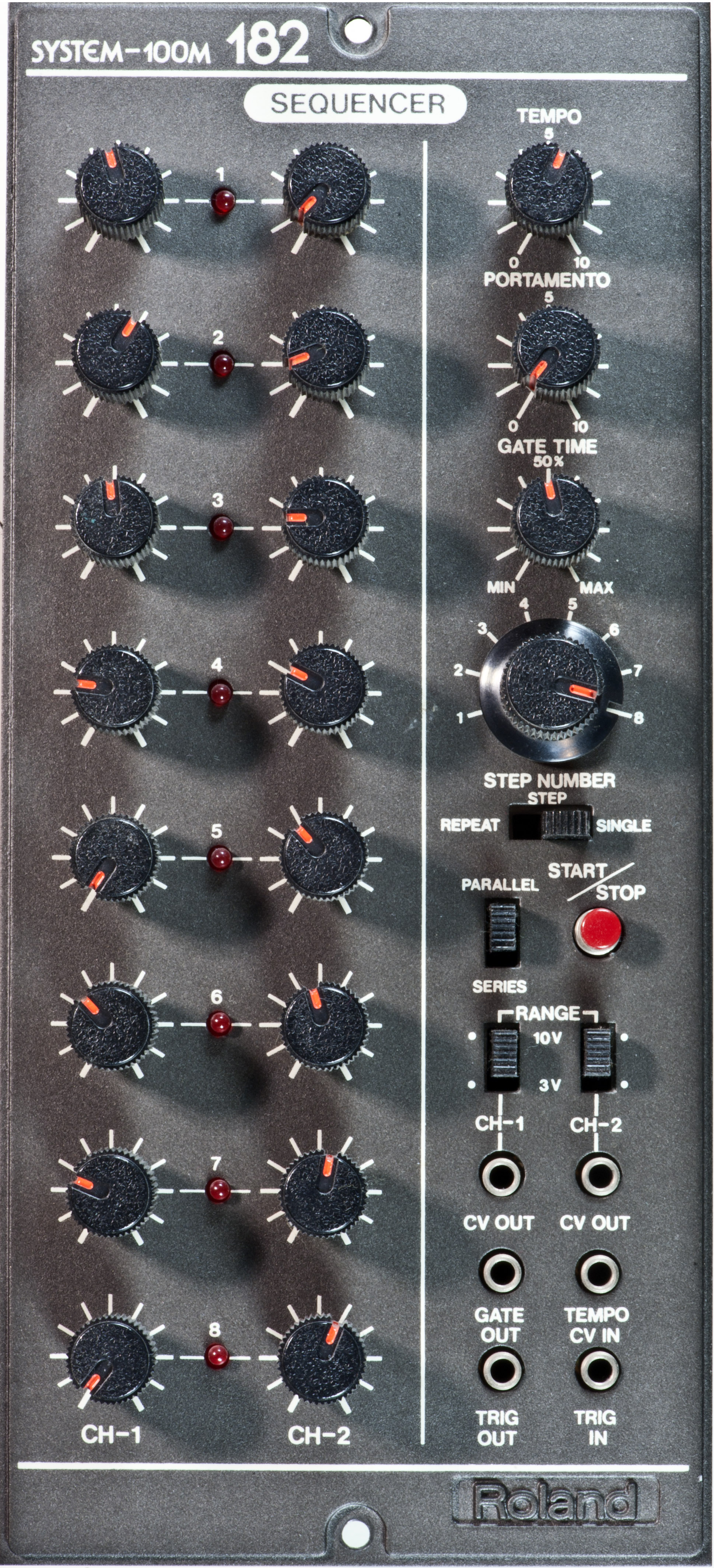
Roland System 100M Model 182 Sequencer

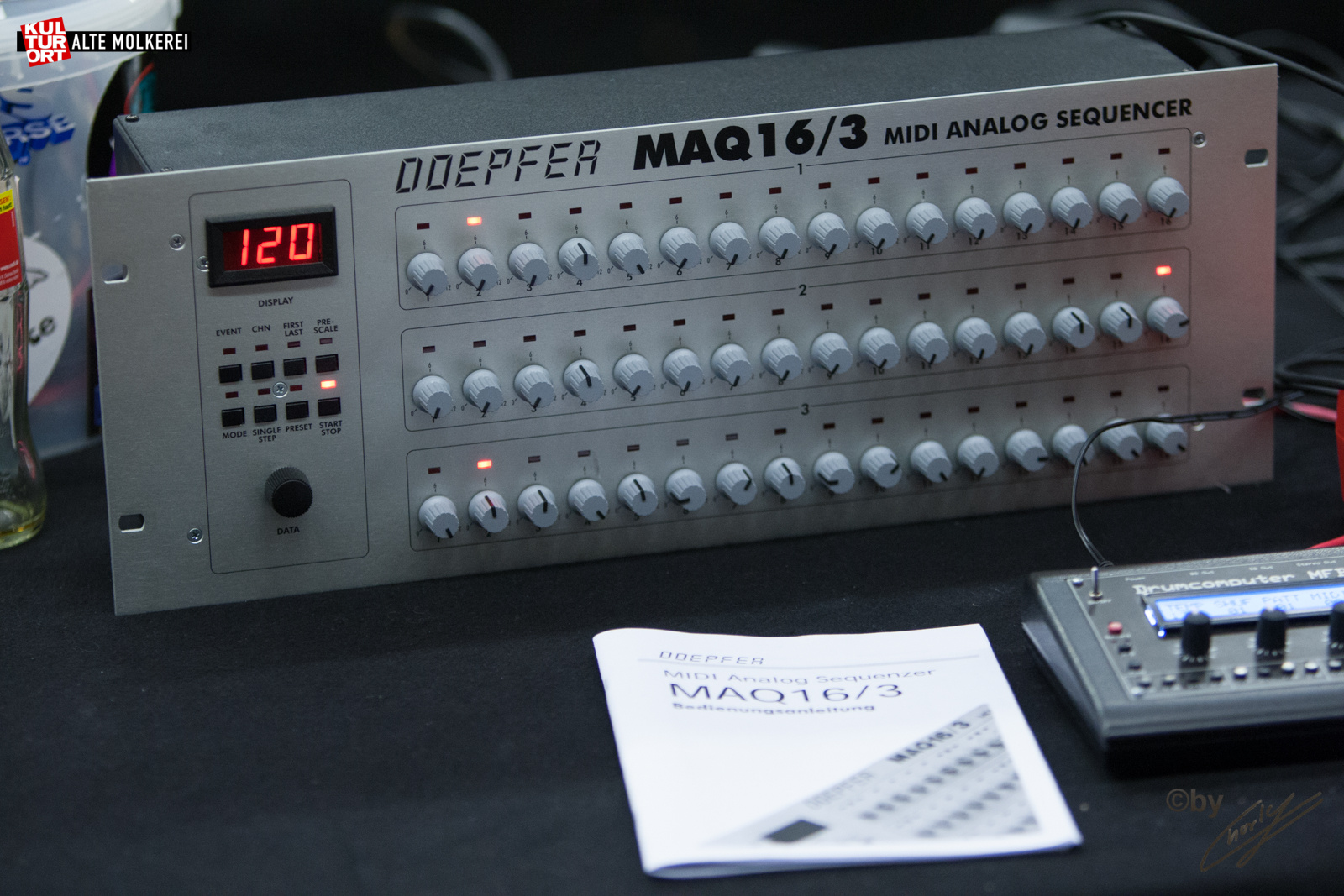
Doepfer MAQ16-3 MIDI Analog Sequencer

== See also ==
- Music sequencer
- Modular synthesizer
