= Alpha Centauri (album) =

- 1971 LP album cover

Studio album by Tangerine Dream
- Released: March 1971
- Recorded: January 1971
- Studio: Dierks Studio
- Genres: Krautrock; electronic; space music
- Length: 39:48
- Label: Ohr
- Producer: Tangerine Dream

Tangerine Dream chronology
Electronic Meditation (1970)	Alpha Centauri (1971)	Zeit (1972)

Alpha Centauri is the second studio album by German electronic music group Tangerine Dream. It was released in March 1971 by record label Ohr.

== Content ==
The music on this album is quite different from Tangerine Dream's first album Electronic Meditation, partly because of a heavier reliance on keyboards and electronic technology, although they still mostly remain in the background: the dominant instruments on the album are organ and flute. The shift in instrumentation resulted in an atmosphere dubbed by Edgar Froese himself as "Kosmische Musik". Julian Cope's Head Heritage wrote that the album "used the space rock template from [Pink Floyd's] Saucerful of Secrets (and removed the rock)".

A nowadays extremely rare single "Ultima Thule" was released in February of the same year. Side 1 employs the same guitar riff as "Fly and Collision of Comas Sola", but the single was at the time otherwise an unconnected release. Re-releases of Alpha Centauri in the 2000s have however included either or both parts of "Ultima Thule" as bonus tracks.

== Release ==
Professional ratings
Review scores
Source	Rating
AllMusic	2.5/5 stars
Head Heritage	positive
Pitchfork	7.8/10

Alpha Centauri was released in March 1971 by record label Ohr. It sold 20,000 copies in their native Germany, nearly four times as many as their later classic Phaedra.

== Track listing ==
Side A
No.	Title	Length
1.	"Sunrise in the Third System"	4:21
2.	"Fly and Collision of Comas Sola"	13:23

Side B
No.	Title	Length
1.	"Alpha Centauri"	22:04

Reissue bonus tracks
No.	Title	Length
4.	"Oszillator Planet Concert" (Sanctuary/Castle (2002), Arcàngelo (2004), Reactive/Esoteric (2011))	8:03
5.	"Ultima Thule, Part One (2000 remix)" (Arcàngelo (2004), Reactive/Esoteric (2011))	3:24
6.	"Ultima Thule, Part Two" (Reactive/Esoteric (2011))	4:24

== Personnel ==
- Edgar Froese – guitar, organ, bass, voice
- Christopher Franke – percussion, lotos flute, pianoharp, zither, synthesizer
- Steve Schroyder – organ, voice, echo machines, iron stick
- Udo Dennebourg – flute, lyrics
- Roland Paulick – synthesizer
