= Legend (Tangerine Dream soundtrack) =

Soundtrack album by Tangerine Dream
- Released: April 1986
- Recorded: 1985
- Studio: Tangerine Dream Berlin City Studio
- Genre: Electronic
- Length: 40:33
- Label: MCA/Varèse Sarabande
- Producer: Tangerine Dream

Tangerine Dream chronology
Green Desert (1986)	Legend (1986)	Pergamon (1986)

Compact disc version

Professional ratings
Review scores
Source	Rating
AllMusic	4.5/5 stars

Legend is the twenty-eighth major release and the eighth soundtrack album by the German band Tangerine Dream. It was released in 1986 for the North American theatrical version of the film Legend. It was released in the US and Canada only. The film was written by William Hjortsberg, starred Tom Cruise, Mia Sara and Tim Curry, was produced by Arnon Milchan, directed by Ridley Scott and released domestically by Universal Studios. The album was released on compact disc on 15 August 1995 through Varese Sarabande.

== Background ==
After a disappointing test screening with Jerry Goldsmith's original orchestral score, Ridley Scott decided to make changes to the film. Sidney Sheinberg, president of MCA, the parent company of Universal at the time, felt that the Goldsmith score would not appeal to the youth and pressed Ridley Scott for a new score. Tangerine Dream was contracted to complete a new, more contemporary score—a job they completed in three weeks. Until 2002, only European audiences could see Legend with Goldsmith's score.

== Versions ==
Several bootleg versions of the album exist, and vary in cover artwork to track listing as well as song length and titles. Many of the bootleg editions feature around twice as many songs as the original soundtrack, including those that were omitted from the original, such as the opening "Prologue."

== Tangerine Dream score ==
"Loved by the Sun" is a vocal version of "Unicorn Theme" with lyrics written and sung by Jon Anderson of Yes. The vocals were added after Tangerine Dream had composed the instrumental music. It was originally recorded with vocals by Susanne Pawlitzki based on William Blake's poem "The Angel," but was rejected in favor of the Jon Anderson version. "Unicorn Theme" has been played live at several concerts in various versions. "Is Your Love Strong Enough?"—the song played over the end credits—has lyrics written and sung by Bryan Ferry with guitar by David Gilmour (of Pink Floyd fame), bass by Guy Pratt, and sax by Iain Ballamy. It is a former outtake of the recording sessions for Avalon, the eighth and last Roxy Music album. All of the other tracks are Tangerine Dream instrumentals. "Is Your Love Strong Enough?" was also released as a 12" single which included an extended version of the same song as well as an instrumental; neither of these last two versions were included on the Avalon album.

== Prologue ==
Tangerine Dream had recorded another piece that did not appear on the official soundtrack, but did appear in the film. It has only been found in bootlegs, in MP3 form at some P2P sites, and also on some streaming services, particularly Rdio. Within both mediums, the song was given either the title "Prologue" or "Once Long Ago". This music can be heard in the intro to the American film release and is also heard in one of the early scenes between Jack and Lilly. It is recognized for its distinct and memorable flute melody. Additionally, some of this melody can be heard at the end of the song, "Loved by the Sun," as it fades out. It can be theorized that the band originally intended that outro to be the "epilogue," reprising the opening melody as a means of continuity - to end the story in the place where it began.

The reason for the exclusion of "Prologue" from the official soundtrack album is unknown.

The song "Prologue" is included on Amazon Music's "Legend: Music From The Motion Picture," composed by Tangerine Dream and arranged by Brandon K. Verrett. The album includes 20 songs and has a run time of 1 hour and 13 minutes.

== DVD isolated score ==
Legend: Ultimate Edition was released on DVD in May 2002. One of the DVD options is to play the U.S. version with an isolated Tangerine Dream score. There is no music other than what had already been released on LP and CD, nor is there any dialogue or sound effects. Thus, the DVD plays with long silences in between the music.

== Reception ==
Daevid Jehnzen of AllMusic gave the album 4.5 out of 5 stars, praising the "atmospheric, electronic soundscapes" of the album. However, Jehnzen thought that the soundtrack "doesn't quite match the splendor of their earlier work" and criticized the pop songs by Bryan Ferry and Jon Anderson. Keyboard praised the album for its use of darker tracks, opining that they "have more balls than just about anything T. Dream has ever done before", but criticized the album for its overuse of the Shakuhachi sample from the Emulator II keyboard. In another review of the soundtrack in the same issue of Keyboard, Connor Freff Cochran called it the "audio equivalent of computer clip-art" due to the overuse of the samples, especially the "Shepard tone preset" and the Shakuhachi sample. The soundtrack reached #92 on the Canadian album charts.

== Track listing ==
All music is composed by Edgar Froese, Chris Franke, Johannes Schmoelling except as noted.

No.	Title	Lyrics	Music	Length
1.	"Is Your Love Strong Enough?"	Bryan Ferry	Bryan Ferry	5:10
2.	"Opening"			2:53
3.	"Cottage"			3:19
4.	"Unicorn Theme"			3:22
5.	"Goblins"			3:00
6.	"Fairies"			2:57
7.	"Loved by the Sun"	Jon Anderson		5:57
8.	"Blue Room"			3:24
9.	"The Dance"			2:23
10.	"Darkness"			3:05
11.	"The Kitchen / The Unicorn Theme Reprise"			4:49

The track order, for the most part, follows the order of appearance in the film, with the exception of two of the songs: "Loved by the Sun," is heard during the film's final scene, and "Is Your Love Strong Enough?" is heard during the film's ending credits.
