= Sorcerer (soundtrack) =

Soundtrack album by Tangerine Dream
- Released: July 1977
- Recorded: April – October 1976
- Venue: Berlin
- Studio: Victoria Studios
- Genres: Electronic music; progressive rock; space music
- Length: 43.52
- Label: MCA

Tangerine Dream chronology
Stratosfear (1976)	Sorcerer (1977)	Encore (1977)

Professional ratings
Review scores
Source	Rating
AllMusic	3/5 stars

Sorcerer (1977) is the ninth major release and first soundtrack album by the German band Tangerine Dream. It is the soundtrack for the film Sorcerer. It reached No.25 on the UK Albums Chart in a seven-week run. This made the album Tangerine Dream's third highest-charting album in the UK.

== Track listing ==
All tracks are written by Edgar Froese, Christoph Franke, Peter Baumann.

Side one
No.	Title	Length
1.	"Main Title"	5:28
2.	"Search"	2:54
3.	"The Call"	1:57
4.	"Creation"	5:00
5.	"Vengeance"	5:32
6.	"The Journey"	2:00

Side two
No.	Title	Length
1.	"Grind"	3:01
2.	"Rain Forest"	2:30
3.	"Abyss"	7:04
4.	"The Mountain Road"	1:53
5.	"Impressions of Sorcerer"	2:55
6.	"Betrayal (Sorcerer Theme)"	3:38

== Personnel ==
- Edgar Froese – Fender Stratocaster, Gibson Les Paul Custom Guitars, Twin Keyboard Mellotron Mark V, Steinway Grand Piano, Oberheim Polyphonic Synthesizer, ARP Omni string synthesizer, PPG Synthesizer, Modified Moog synthesizer.
- Christopher Franke – Moog modular synthesizer, Projekt Elektronik sequencer, Computerstudio Digital Sequencer, Mellotron, ARP Pro Soloist synthesizer, Elka String Synthesizer, Oberheim sequencer.
- Peter Baumann – Projekt Elektronik Modular Synthesizer, Projekt Elektronik Sequencer, Fender Rhodes Piano, ARP Pro Soloist synthesizer, Mellotron.

== Singles ==
Betrayal/Betrayal
No.	Title	Length
1.	"Betrayal (Sorcerer Theme)"	3:38
2.	"Betrayal (Sorcerer Theme)"	3:38

Betrayal/Grind
No.	Title	Length
1.	"Betrayal (Sorcerer Theme)"	3:38
2.	"Grind"	3:01

Betrayal/Search
No.	Title	Length
1.	"Betrayal (Sorcerer Theme)"	3:38
2.	"Search"	2:54

Grind/Betrayal
No.	Title	Length
1.	"Grind"	3:01
2.	"Betrayal (Sorcerer Theme)"	3:38

Grind/Impressions Of Sorcerer
No.	Title	Length
1.	"Grind"	3:01
2.	"Impressions Of Sorcerer"	2:55
