= Zeit (Tangerine Dream album) =

Zeit (Largo in Four Movements)
- Original 1972 LP album cover / 2002 CD album reissue

Studio album by Tangerine Dream
- Released: August 1972
- Recorded: 1972
- Studio: Dierks Studio
- Genres: Krautrock; electronic; ambient; space music
- Length: 74:29
- Label: Ohr
- Producer: Tangerine Dream

Tangerine Dream chronology
Alpha Centauri (1971)	Zeit (Largo in Four Movements) (1972)	Atem (1973)

Alternative cover
- 1986 reissue cover

Zeit ([t͡saɪ̯t], "Time") is the third studio album by German electronic music group Tangerine Dream. A double LP, it was released in August 1972, being the first release featuring Peter Baumann, who joined then-current members Christopher Franke and Edgar Froese. Zeit is subtitled Largo in Four Movements.

== Content ==
The style of this album is slower and more atmospheric than their previous albums. AllMusic wrote, "TD's purest expression of 'space music', this double album ebbs and flows effortlessly from one tone cluster to another. Almost classical in construction, the music is structured so as to evolve in sections as one theme literally melts into the next." Music critics often refer to Zeit as being one of the first (or perhaps the first) examples of dark ambient music.

Florian Fricke from the Munich-based group Popol Vuh plays Moog synthesizer on the record, and four cellists appear on the first track. The album cover depicts a solar eclipse.

As explained by Paul Russell for the 2002 reissue, "Zeit, which means 'time', was based on the philosophy that time was in fact motionless and only existed in our own minds."

== Release ==
Professional ratings
Review scores
Source	Rating
AllMusic	3.5/5 stars
Head Heritage	positive
Uncut	5/10

Zeit was released in August 1972 by record label Ohr.

Before the 2002 reissue, there were two common releases on CD: a single CD release by Castle Music and a double CD set. The double CD set from Relativity in 1987 is longer by a few seconds, mainly because of longer inter-track gaps. Relativity also put out a single cassette, with the following song timings: 20:00, 18:00, 20:12, 17:43. The double CD set has a light blue border on the front and back covers.

The 2011 release includes a second CD with the 25 November 1972 Klangwald concert at Cologne's WDR Sendesaal hall in West Germany, previously released as Tangerine Tree 52: Cologne 1972.

Zomba Music Publishers Limited had released five CD series back in 1996. They all had the same front geometrical lines cover but with different colors; the Zeit album had it in blue. Despite the sleeve notes and the CD containing the following song timings 20:00, 18:00, 20:12, 17:43, the real timings of track 4 ("Zeit") measured in any CD player at only 16:58 but the music starts with some extra 45 seconds of previously unheard music on all the other releases. If one may carefully mix-add these seconds to the beginning of the "Zeit" track from the any after-1996 releases, that would get about 17:30 full track. This also means, at a careful listening of the Zomba release, track 4 ends earlier than any of the after-1996 releases. (To add to the track timing confusions, a recently digitised copy of the original German Ohr label LP release from 1972, using a correctly calibrated Pro-Ject record deck, provides the following track timings, including track bands of several seconds on sides 1 to 3: 20:52; 20:35; 18:54; 18:46.)

== Reception ==
In a retrospective review, Julian Cope's Head Heritage website described Zeit as a "monolithic and gloomy double album" that "wanders through droning passages of emptiness as the origins and formation of the universe are charted [...] It's the band at their most abstract and austere, their most difficult album."

== Legacy ==
Zeit has been mentioned by English musician Steven Wilson as his favorite album of all time, calling it the "birth of ambient music."

== Track listing ==
All titles written by Edgar Froese, Christopher Franke and Peter Baumann; early Ohr pressings of the album credit Froese alone

Side A
No.	Title	Length
1.	"Birth of Liquid Plejades"	19:54

Side B
No.	Title	Length
1.	"Nebulous Dawn"	17:56

Side C
No.	Title	Length
1.	"Origin of Supernatural Probabilities"	19:34

Side D
No.	Title	Length
1.	"Zeit"	16:58
Total length:		74:22

== Personnel ==
Tangerine Dream

- Edgar Froese – audio generators, gliss guitar
- Christopher Franke – keyboards, cymbals, VCS3 analog synthesizer
- Peter Baumann – organ, vibraphone, VCS3 analog synthesizer

Former Tangerine Dream

- Steve Schroyder – organ outro on "Birth of Liquid Plejades"

Additional musicians

- Florian Fricke – Moog synthesizer on "Birth of Liquid Plejades"
- The Cologne Cello Quartet — Cello intro on "Birth of Liquid Plejades"
  - Christian Vallbracht
  - Joachim von Grumbkow; credited as Jochen von Grumbcow; co-founder of Hoelderlin
  - Hans Joachim Brüne
  - Johannes Lücke

Credits

- Dieter Dierks – recording engineer
- Edgar Froese – cover art
- Monique Froese – cover and sleeve photography
