= Encore (Tangerine Dream album) =

Live album by Tangerine Dream
- Released: October 1977
- Recorded: 29 March – 26 April 1977
- Venue: Various venues during North American tour
- Genres: Electronic; kosmische
- Length: 71:49
- Label: Virgin
- Producer: Tangerine Dream

Tangerine Dream chronology
Sorcerer (1977)	Encore (1977)	Cyclone (1978)

Professional ratings
Review scores
Source	Rating
AllMusic	4/5 stars

Encore: Tangerine Dream Live is the tenth major release and second live album by the German group Tangerine Dream. It is mostly assembled from various recordings from the band's very successful 1977 U.S. tour.

== Background ==
Tangerine Dream performed "Cherokee Lane" and "Monolight", or some variants thereof, at every concert in 1977. The released version of "Monolight" has been identified as having been recorded in Washington, D.C., on 4 April. The spoken introduction – by Leo del Aguila a.k.a. Prof. Mota, WGTB’s music director – of the album also comes from that concert. A fantape of this complete concert was officially released as a part of the Bootleg Box Set vol. 2 in 2004. (Two other tracks, named "Monolith" and "Drywater Rush" on Tangerine Tree volume 4 and subsequently also on the Bootleg Box, were also played in some form from concert to concert, but were not included on Encore.) With regard to "Coldwater Canyon", Edgar Froese has stated that the track was played only once, during the tour’s leg in the southwestern United States.

After a slightly experimental wind effect and organ intro, "Cherokee Lane" settles into a hypnotic sequencer/Mellotron improvisation. "Monolight" starts with a piano improvisation, followed by a short melodic piece (called just Encore on the single release) set to a march-like rhythm. After this, a more typical sequence is brought in and Tangerine Dream return to improvisation, tangenting the main themes to the title track from their previous studio album Stratosfear, and "Betrayal" from their soundtrack album Sorcerer. This section was on the 1994 compilation Tangents subtitled "Yellow Part". The track ends with another piano section, this time a version of the ending from Stratosfear's final track "Invisible Limits" which, in turn, is based on Beethoven's "Moonlight Sonata". "Coldwater Canyon" plunges headfirst into another sequencer-based improvisation with a very choppy rhythm, laced with extensive guitar work from Froese.

In contrast to the other three tracks, "Desert Dream" is a collage of older, more atmospheric material, including leftover material from previous studio albums as well as parts of the group’s soundtrack to the play Oedipus Tyrannus, recorded live in Chichester in August 1974.

== Track listing ==
All tracks are written by Chris Franke, Edgar Froese, Peter Baumann.

Side one
No.	Title	Length
1.	"Cherokee Lane"	16:19

Side two
No.	Title	Length
1.	"Monolight"	19:54

Side three
No.	Title	Length
1.	"Coldwater Canyon"	18:06

Side four
No.	Title	Length
1.	"Desert Dream"	17:30

== Singles ==
- "Encore" – "Hobo March"

== Personnel ==
- Edgar Froese – electric guitar, Steinway Grand Piano, ARP Omni, Mellotron V, Moog modular synthesizer, Oberheim Four Voice, Palm Products GmbH 1020, Projekt Elektronik sequencer, producer, engineer, mastering
- Christopher Franke – ARP Pro Soloist, Elka Rhapsody 610 string machine, Mellotron M400, Moog modular synthesizer, Oberheim OB-1, electronic percussion, Projekt Elektronik sequencer, Computerstudio digital sequencer, Oberheim sequencer, producer, engineer, sequencing, mastering
- Peter Baumann – Fender Rhodes electric piano, ARP Pro Soloist, ELKA Rhapsody 610 string machine, EMS Vocoder, Mellotron M400, Projekt Elektronik Modular Synthesizer, Projekt Elektronik sequencer, producer, engineer, mastering, mixing

=== Additional personnel ===
- Monique Froese – photography
- Hartmut Heinze – engineer
- Simon Heyworth – digital remastering
- Mark Prendergast – liner notes

== Chart performance ==
Year	Chart	Position
1977	UK Album Chart	55
