= Tenchi the Movie: Tenchi Muyo in Love =

Tenchi the Movie: Tenchi in Love!
- Region 1 DVD Cover released by Pioneer
- Directed by: Hiroshi Negishi
- Screenplay by: Ryoe Tsukimura; Hiroshi Negishi
- Based on: Tenchi Muyo! by Masaki Kajishima
- Produced by: Takeshi Yasuda; Hideki Aoyama; Shigeru Tsukamoto; Atsumi Okada; Yoshikiyo Arai
- Cinematography: Hitoshi Satō
- Edited by: Toshio Henmi
- Music by: Christopher Franke
- Production companies: Anime International Company; Pioneer LDC
- Distributed by: GAGA Communications Inc
- Release date: April 20, 1996
- Running time: 95 minutes
- Country: Japan
- Language: Japanese

Tenchi the Movie: Tenchi in Love!, also known in Japan as Tenchi Muyo in Love! (天地無用 IN LOVE!, Tenchi Muyō in Rabu!), is a 1996 Japanese animated film and the first of three films set in the Tenchi Muyo! multi-verse.

The film takes place after the conclusion of Tenchi Universe, and so varies from the original OVAs at several points. Most noticeable of these is the inclusion of Achika as Tenchi's mother instead of Kiyone Masaki. It was followed by Tenchi Forever!, released in 1999.

== Plot ==
After being defeated by the Jurai Emperor and the Galaxy Police centuries ago, the monstrously powerful Super A-1 class criminal Kain was imprisoned in the subspace room of the GP's headquarters, never to be released.

In the present (established to be 1996, the year of the film's release), Kain escapes his bonds, destroys the GP space station, and travels back in time to take his revenge on Jurai's royal family. The Galaxy Police only has time to send a short warning, which Mihoshi and Kiyone intercept.

The Masaki house, the shrine, and Tenchi himself all begin to fade out of existence. Washu theorizes that someone is tampering with the established timeline, and uses a shield to keep Tenchi from vanishing. The shield is only a temporary solution, so Washu sends the rest of the group back to 1970 to prevent Kain from killing Tenchi's mother Achika.

Tenchi's friends assume roles at Tenchi's father Nobuyuki and Achika's high school, while Tenchi himself stays hidden to prevent causing a paradox. Tenchi and his friends must also deal with a rogue GP operative bent on seizing glory by killing Kain.

After determining the exact time that Kain strikes in 1970, the group tries to defend Achika, only to see the villain escape into subspace with her and Nobuyuki. Tenchi, Ayeka and Ryoko follow and challenge Kain, but even with their powers boosted by Washu they are no match for him.

Washu sends a powerful "dimensional cannon" from the present, and Kiyone mans the weapon to destroy Kain. Tenchi is wounded, and Achika unlocks her latent Jurai powers to fuel his sword and deal a crippling blow to Kain. The group barely escapes in time before the dimensional cannon is fired into their pocket of subspace, finally destroying Kain.

Before her memory is wiped along with Nobuyuki's, Achika asks Ryoko and Ayeka to take care of Tenchi, since she will not be there for him in their present.

== Cast ==
- Masami Kikuchi as Tenchi Masaki
- Ai Orikasa as Ryoko
- Megumi Hayashibara as Achika
- Yumi Takada as Ayeka
- Chisa Yokoyama as Sasami
- Etsuko Kozakura as Ryo-Ohki
- Ryūzaburō Ōtomo as Kain
- Toshiyuki Morikawa as young Nobuyuki Masaki
- Yuko Kobayashi as Washu
- Yuko Mizutani as Mihoshi
- Yuri Amano as Kiyone
- Takeshi Aono as Nobuyuki Masaki

== Music ==
The music for Tenchi in Love was composed by Christopher Franke (formerly of Tangerine Dream and the main composer for the Babylon 5 series).

The end theme song is Alchemy of Love, written by Franke and performed by Nina Hagen, with Rick Jude on backing vocals.

There is also an Achika version of the song, with new Japanese lyrics, and is performed by Megumi Hayashibara (Achika's Japanese voice actress). The Achika version is available on a single mini-CD (Pioneer PIDA-1033) and on the Japanese LaserDisc version of the movie, as a music video, which also features the original English version.

== Distribution ==
Tenchi in Love! had its US television premiere during Sci-Fi Channel's (now SyFy) Anime theme week on August 26, 1996.

In North America, it was initially released on home video in the '90s by Pioneer Entertainment USA with the US CAV THX Laserdisc released on the 3rd of September, 1996 and the CLV Laserdisc released on the 21st of October, 1997, before they released it independently on DVD in 2003. This release was one of the few releases from Pioneer/Geneon to have THX-certified video, re-mastered for superior picture quality, and with the audio, remixed in 5.1 Dolby Digital AC3 surround sound. After Pioneer's shut down in 2007, FUNimation Entertainment announced the license of the movie, along with a handful of other Geneon titles. The movie is distributed by Madman Entertainment in Australia and New Zealand and by MVM Films in the United Kingdom. It was released on Blu-ray Disc in North America in December 2012 by FUNimation in a box set with the other Tenchi movies.
