= Peter Baumann =

German musician (born 1953)

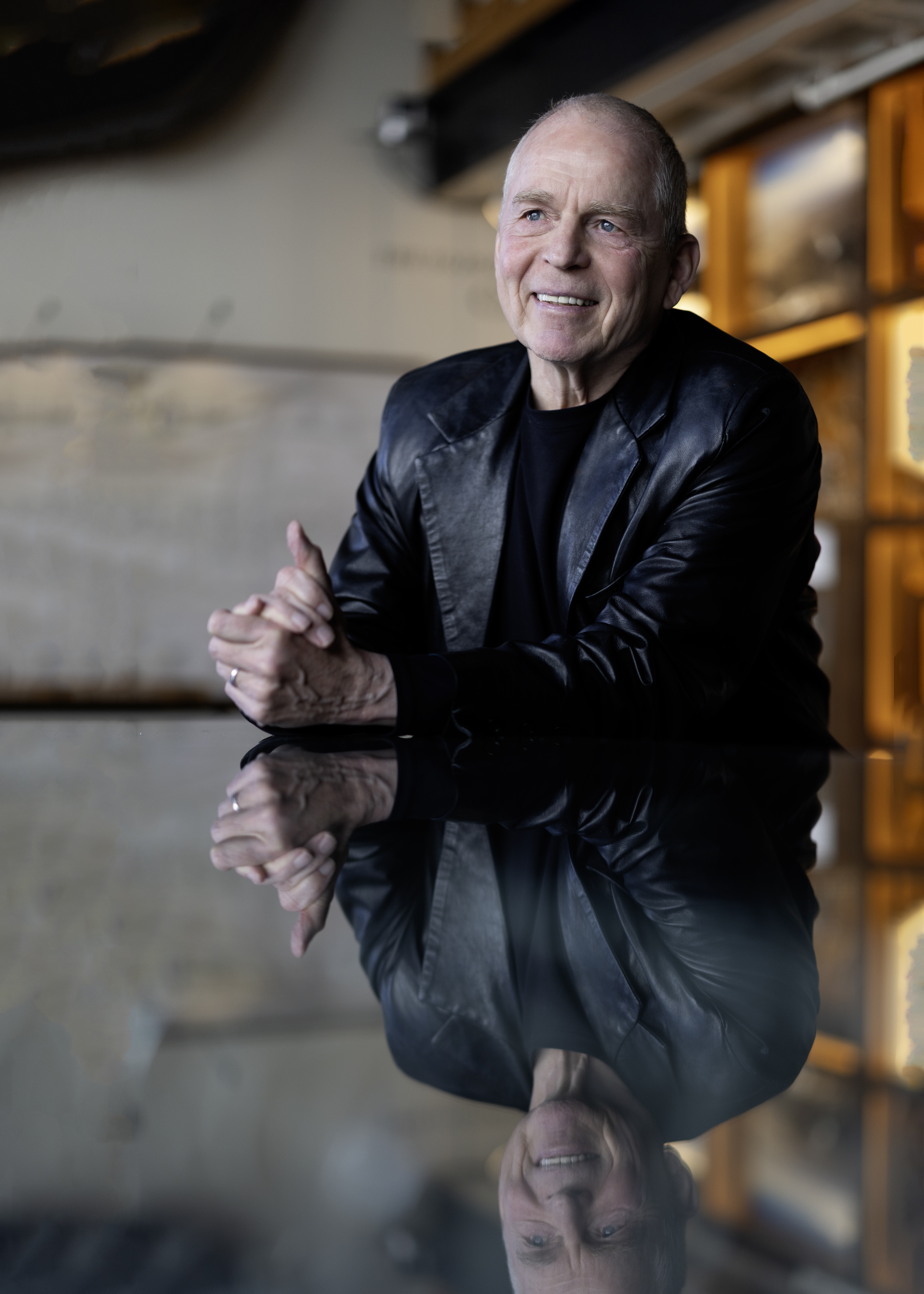

Background information
- Born: 29 January 1953 (age 73); West Berlin, West Germany
- Genres: Electronic
- Occupations: Musician; songwriter; record label owner
- Instruments: Keyboards, organ
- Labels: Virgin/EMI, Portrait, Arista, Private Music

Peter Baumann (born 29 January 1953) is a German musician. He formed the core line-up of the German electronic group Tangerine Dream with Edgar Froese and Christopher Franke in 1971. Baumann composed his first solo album in 1976, while still touring with the band, and embarked on a solo career in 1977. He founded the record label Private Music. Since the early 2000s, Baumann has focused on initiatives in science and philosophy related to the study of human condition.

== Background ==
Peter Baumann was born in West Berlin, West Germany, in 1953, his father a composer, his mother an actress. When he was eight, the Berlin Wall was built, and Baumann entered the American/German Community School in West Berlin, where he learned English and was first exposed to American culture. At age 14, Peter joined a cover band and performed at G.I. clubs. Then, in 1971, at age 18, he met Christopher Franke, and ended up joining Tangerine Dream as a replacement for their former organist Steve Schroyder.

Two years later, Tangerine Dream signed with Virgin Records and their first album on the label, Phaedra, became a Top 10 seller on the Melody Maker charts. As a result of this and other recording successes, Tangerine Dream toured the world for eight years and composed scores for several films.

Baumann had temporarily left Tangerine Dream twice, first in 1973 (returning in time for Franke & Froese to shelf their current work on Green Desert and the three to start anew on what was to become Phaedra), and again in 1975, leaving Michael Hoenig as a temporary substitute for an Australian tour. His departure in 1977, shortly after the completion of the band's first U.S. tour, was final and led to a brief solo career. During the 1980s, he founded the record label Private Music, which released instrumental albums often categorized as new-age. Artists signed to the label included Yanni, Patrick O'Hearn, Jerry Goodman, Suzanne Ciani, and former bandmates Tangerine Dream. In 1996, the label was sold to Windham Hill Records' parent company, BMG, who continue to distribute some of the back catalogue of its more successful artists.

== The Baumann Foundation ==
Following his music career, Peter Baumann moved to San Francisco, where in 2009 he founded the Baumann Foundation: a think-tank that explores the experience of being human in the context of cognitive science, evolutionary theory and philosophy. The foundation aims to foster greater clarity about the human condition, by organizing initiatives that facilitate scientific research and promote discussions between scientists, contemplatives, and the public. The Baumann Foundation's main initiative is Beinghuman.org, a social website that hosts discussions on developments in fields such as behavioral economics, cognitive neuroscience, and evolutionary psychology.

In 2012 the foundation sponsored Being Human 2012, an interdisciplinary conference held in San Francisco’s Palace of Fine Arts that brought together neuroscientists, philosophers, evolutionary theorists and meditation experts to hold a public dialogue about the nature of humanity.

Baumann is the co-author, with Michael W. Taft, of the 2011 book Ego: The Fall of the Twin Towers and the Rise of an Enlightened Humanity. The book draws on new research in neuroscience, evolutionary biology, and other scientific fields to examine the origin and history of the human ego and the evolutionary implications of the September 11 attacks.

== Personal life ==
Baumann has been married to Alison Baumann since 1983, and has three children. He is the director of several real estate and natural resource companies. In addition to creating the Baumann Foundation, he is on the board of directors of the California Institute of Integral Studies and is a fellow of the Mind and Life Institute.

== Discography ==
=== As a member of Tangerine Dream ===
==== Albums ====
- Zeit (1972)
- Atem (1973)
- Phaedra (1974)
- Rubycon (1975)
- Ricochet (1975)
- Stratosfear (1976)
- Sorcerer (soundtrack) (1977)
- Encore (1977)

=== Solo career ===
==== Albums ====
- Romance '76 (1977) (LP)
- Trans Harmonic Nights (1979) (LP)
- Repeat Repeat (1981) (LP)
- Strangers In The Night (1983) (LP)
- Blue Room (promo cassette with Paul Haslinger & John Baxter) (1991)
- Phase by Phase: A Retrospective '76 - '81 (1996) (CD)
- Machines of Desire (2016) (CD)
- Neuland (with Paul Haslinger) (2019) (CD, LP)
- Nightfall (2025) (CD, LP)

==== EP ====
- Bicentennial Present (7" single) (1976)
- Biking Up The Strand (7" single) (1979)
- Realtimes (7" single) (1981)
- Daytime Logic (Extended Dance Mix) (12" single) (1981)
- The Russians are Coming (12" single, with Conrad Schnitzler) (1982)

==== Other appearances ====
- Welcome to Joyland (with Leda, as 'Hacoon Mail') (1978)
- Grosses Wasser (co-producer on the Cluster album) (1979)

== See also ==
- List of ambient music artists
