= Green Desert =

- 1986 LP album cover

Studio album by Tangerine Dream
- Released: January 1986
- Recorded: Skyline Studios, Berlin; August 1973, with additional remixing in 1984
- Genre: Electronic, krautrock
- Length: 38:22
- Label: Jive Electro
- Producer: Edgar Froese, Christoph Franke

Tangerine Dream chronology
Le Parc (1985)	Green Desert (1986)	Legend (1986)

Professional ratings
Review scores
Source	Rating
AllMusic	3/5 stars

Green Desert is the twenty-seventh major release and the fifteenth studio album by electronic artists Tangerine Dream. The music was recorded in Berlin in 1973, during a period when Peter Baumann had temporarily left Germany to tour Nepal and India. Though unreleased at the time, it landed Tangerine Dream a record deal when Virgin heard the tapes. A remixed version of the music was released in 1986.

The group had recently acquired new equipment including a Minimoog, a phaser, and an EKO ComputeRhythm which could be pre-programmed and/or changed on-the-fly while it was playing. Chris Franke considered the six internal sounds to be "pretty lousy" but, due to its flexibility as a sequencer, later modified it as a controller to trigger external sounds. This rhythmic effect was featured in several of Tangerine Dream's later albums.

== Track listing ==
All songs written by Edgar Froese and Christopher Franke.

No.	Title	Length
1.	"Green Desert"	19:25
2.	"White Clouds"	5:01
3.	"Astral Voyager"	7:03
4.	"Indian Summer"	6:53

== Personnel ==
- Edgar Froese – synthesizers, guitars, keyboards
- Christopher Franke – drums, percussion, synthesized percussion, synthesizers

Additional personnel

- Pete Beaulieu – engineering
- Mark Weinberg – sleeve design
