= Christopher Franke =

German musician and composer (born 1953)

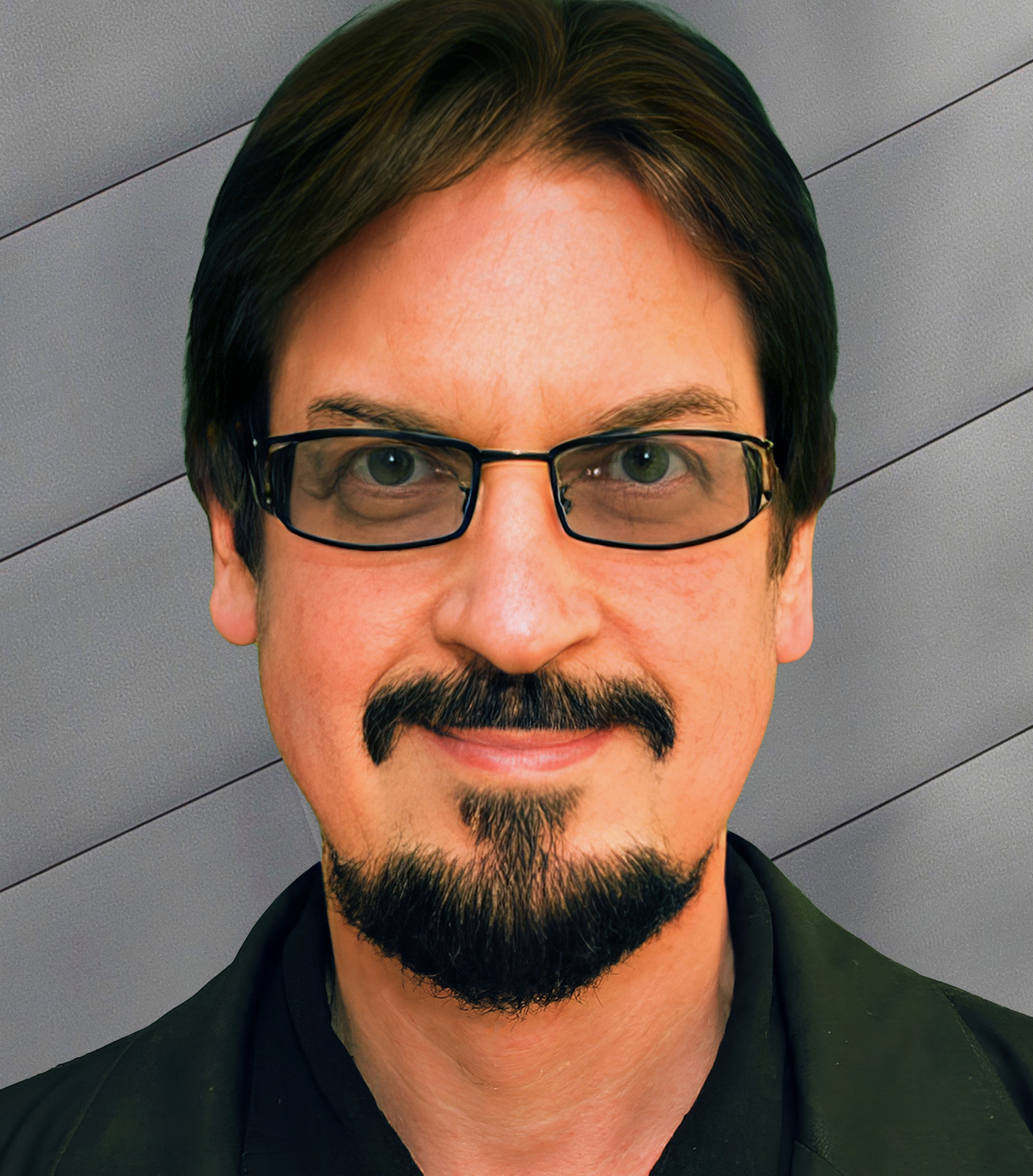

Background information
- Also known as: Chris Franke
- Born: 6 April 1953 (age 73)
- Origin: Berlin, Germany
- Genres: Electronica, Ambient, Rock, New Age, World
- Occupations: Musician, composer, songwriter
- Instruments: Synthesizer, keyboards, drums, sequencer
- Formerly of: Tangerine Dream
- Website: christopherfranke.com

Christopher Franke (born April 6, 1953) is a German film composer and a pioneer of electronic music, as well as a former member of the band Tangerine Dream.

== Early life ==
Franke studied composition at Berlin Conservatory, where his influences included Karlheinz Stockhausen and John Cage.

== Career ==
Franke was a member of the group Tangerine Dream from 1970 to 1987 where he was dubbed the "Sequencer King" for his use of analog sequencer on stage. His use of sequencers with the band is attributed to molding its fast hypnotic style, including on its album Phaedra in 1973. This album paved the way for the classic style of the group and attributed to the Berlin school of sound.

After leaving Tangerine Dream, Franke performed a number of solo projects. He performed live in 1991 at the Astoria Theatre in London. Recorded live with Edgar Rothermich, who also produced and engineered most of his projects, it was released as a full-length album in 1993. In 1991, Franke opened a recording studio in West Hollywood and began composing the music for featured films that included Universal Soldier, Tarzan and the Lost City, and Night of the Running Man. The following year, he founded the record label Sonic Images to release soundtracks, Electronica, and World Music. He also released Pacific Coast Highway, his first solo album outside of Tangerine Dream.

For television, Franke has composed music for a number of television shows including for the Sci-Fi series Babylon 5 and Pacific Blue to name a few.

== Filmography ==
=== Films ===
==== with Tangerine Dream ====
- Sorcerer (1977)
- Thief (1981)
- Identification of a Woman (1982)
- The Soldier (1982)
- Risky Business (1983)
- Wavelength (1983)
- The Keep (1983)
- Firestarter (1984)
- Flashpoint (1984)
- Heartbreakers (1984)
- Forbidden (1984)
- Vision Quest (1985)
- Legend (1985) (American release)
- Shy People (1987)
- Near Dark (1987)
- 3 O'Clock High (1987)
- Canyon Dreams (1987)

==== Solo ====
- Trabbi Goes to Hollywood (1991)
- McBain (1991)
- Eye of the Storm (1991)
- Universal Soldier (1992)
- The Surgeon (1995)
- Night of the Running Man (1995)
- Solo (1996)
- Public Enemies (1996)
- Tenchi the Movie: Tenchi Muyo in Love (1996)
- Tarzan and the Lost City (1998)
- Ms. Bear (1997)
- Fortress 2: Re-Entry (2000)
- The Calling (2000)
- Jack the Dog (2001)
- Johnny Flynton (2002)
- Manhood (2003)
- Babylon 5: The Lost Tales (2007)

=== Television ===
==== with Tangerine Dream ====
- The Park Is Mine (1985) (TV movie)
- Street Hawk (1985)
- Deadly Care (1987) (TV movie)
- Tonight's The Night (1987) (TV movie)

==== Solo ====
- She Woke Up (1992) (TV movie)
- Raven (1992–1993)
- The Tommyknockers (1993) (TV miniseries)
- Walker, Texas Ranger (1993-2000)
- Tales from the Crypt (1993) (Episode: "Came the Dawn")
- The Yarn Princess (1994) (TV movie)
- Angel Falls (1993)
- Babylon 5 (1994-1998) (110 episodes)
- Movie Magic (1994-1997)
- Beyond Betrayal (1994) (TV movie)
- M.A.N.T.I.S (1994)
- Kidnapped: In the Line of Duty (1995) (TV movie)
- Pacific Blue (1996–2000) (101 episodes)
- Hypernauts (1996)
- A Face to Die For (1996) (TV movie)
- Code Name: Wolverine (1996) (TV movie)
- Tell Me No Secrets (1997) (TV movie)
- The Inheritance (1997) (TV movie)
- The Devil's Child (1997) (TV movie)
- Menno's Mind (1997) (TV movie)
- Babylon 5: In the Beginning (1998) (TV movie)
- Babylon 5: The Gathering (1998) (TV movie)
- Babylon 5: Thirdspace (1998) (TV movie)
- Terror in the Mall (1998) (TV movie)
- Babylon 5: The River of Souls (1998) (TV movie)
- Lost in the Bermuda Triangle (1998) (TV movie)
- From Star Wars to Star Wars: The Story of Industrial Light & Magic (1999)
- The Outer Limits (2000) (Episode: "Judgement Day")
- A Holiday Romance (1999) (TV movie)
- 18 Wheels of Justice (2000–2001)
- Seventeen Again (2000) (TV movie)
- Turtle Hero (2001)
- Murder on the Orient Express (2001)
- When Dinosaurs Roamed America (2001) (miniseries)
- Babylon 5: The Legend of the Rangers (2002) (TV movie)
- Music Behind Bars (2002)
- Dear Santa (2002) (TV special)
- Dancing at the Harvest Moon (2002) (TV movie)
- The Family (2003)
- The Amazing Race (370 episodes; 2003–2026)
- Footsteps (2003) (TV movie)
- Hunter: Back in Force (2003) (TV movie)
- Hunter (2003)
- A Date with Darkness: The Trial and Capture of Andrew Luster (2003) (TV movie)
- The Elizabeth Smart Story (2003) (TV movie)
- Supernanny (2004–2008)

== Discography ==
=== with Tangerine Dream ===
==== Major releases ====
- 1971: Alpha Centauri
- 1972: Zeit
- 1973: Atem
- 1974: Phaedra
- 1975: Rubycon
- 1975: Ricochet (Live)
- 1976: Stratosfear
- 1977: Sorcerer (Soundtrack)
- 1977: Encore (Live)
- 1978: Cyclone
- 1979: Force Majeure
- 1980: Tangram
- 1980: Quichotte (Live)
- 1981: Thief (Soundtrack)
- 1981: Exit
- 1982: White Eagle
- 1982: Logos (Live)
- 1983: Hyperborea
- 1984: Poland (Live)
- 1985: Le Parc
- 1986: Legend (Soundtrack)
- 1986: Green Desert (Recorded 1973)
- 1986: Underwater Sunlight
- 1987: Three O'Clock High (Soundtrack)
- 1987: Tyger
- 1988: Near Dark (Soundtrack)
- 1988: Shy People (Soundtrack)
- 1988: Livemiles (Live)
- 1991: Canyon Dreams (Recorded 1986)

=== Solo ===
- 1991: Pacific Coast Highway
- 1992: Universal Soldier
- 1992: London Concert
- 1993: New Music for Films Vol. 1
- 1993: Klemania
- 1994: Raven
- 1995: Night of the Running Man
- 1995: Babylon 5
- 1996: Perry Rhodan – Pax Terra
- 1996: The Celestine Prophecy
- 1996: Tenchi the Movie: Tenchi Muyo! in Love
- 1996: Enchanting Nature
- 1997: Babylon 5, Vol. 2: Messages from Earth
- 1997: Babylon 5: In the Beginning
- 1997: Babylon 5: Thirdspace
- 1997: Pacific Blue
- 1997: Transformation of Mind
- 1997: Babylon 5: River of Souls
- 1999: Epic
- 2000: Babylon 5: Episodic CDs
- 2000: New Music for Films Vol. 2
- 2000: The Calling
- 2001: The Best of Babylon 5
- 2007: Babylon 5: The Lost Tales
- 2025: Purple Waves

== See also ==
- List of ambient music artists
- Perry Rhodan
