= Force Majeure (Tangerine Dream album) =

Studio album by Tangerine Dream
- Released: 2 February 1979
- Recorded: August–September 1978
- Studios: Hansa, West Berlin, Germany
- Genres: Electronic; progressive rock; space rock
- Length: 40:14
- Label: Virgin
- Producers: Chris Franke, Edgar Froese

Tangerine Dream chronology
Cyclone (1978)	Force Majeure (1979)	Tangram (1980)

Professional ratings
Review scores
Source	Rating
AllMusic	4.5/5 stars

Force Majeure is the ninth studio album by the German group Tangerine Dream. It was originally issued on transparent vinyl. Following Stratosfear, the album developed Tangerine Dream's further evolution toward the more melodic sound they would adopt in the 1980s, with a heavier presence of guitars, drums and distinct musical suites in the tradition of progressive rock, rather than the band's 1970s output of Berlin School.

The distortion of the bass sequence on "Thru Metamorphic Rocks" was the result of a burnt-out transistor in the mixing desk. When the band heard the result, they decided to keep it.

Force Majeure is Tangerine Dream's fourth-biggest-selling album in the UK, reaching No. 26 and spending 7 weeks on the chart.

Monique Froese's rear cover artwork collage includes an image of a man's lower face, apparently a photograph of a sculpture, which looks extremely like the death mask of classical composer Ludwig van Beethoven. His musical influence (heard particularly in some of the harmonic and melodic progressions in Tangerine Dream's music) may possibly be the "force majeure" to which the album title refers. The closing section of the title track also uses La Folia, Op.5, No.12 a classical piece of music by Arcangelo Corelli in 1700.

== Use in other media ==
Remixed excerpts of "Force Majeure" and "Cloudburst Flight" titled "Lana" and "Guido The Killer Pimp" respectively, were used on the film soundtrack of Risky Business while a remixed excerpt of "Thru Metamorphic Rocks" titled "Igneous" was used on the soundtrack of Thief. A heavily remixed version was played live in 2003, and later released as "Meta Morph Magic" on the DM 4 album. In 1991, Christopher Franke played "Cloudburst Flight" as part of his solo London Concert.

== Track listing ==
Side one
No.	Title	Length
1.	"Force Majeure"	18:17

Side two
No.	Title	Length
1.	"Cloudburst Flight"	7:27
2.	"Thru Metamorphic Rocks"	14:30

A 2019 CD version, re-mastered from the original master tapes, includes a 1979 Christopher Franke solo recording, "Chimes and Chains", as a bonus track.

== Personnel ==
Tangerine Dream

- Edgar Froese – keyboards, electric and acoustic guitars, effects
- Christopher Franke – keyboards, sequencers
- Klaus Krüger – drums, percussion

Guest

- Eduard Meyer – cello and steam train recording

== Production ==
- Produced and mixed – Christopher Franke, Edgar Froese
- Engineered – Eduard Meyer
- Painting and cover design – Monica Froese

== Charts ==
Chart (1979)	Peak position
Australia (Kent Music Report)	26
UK Albums (OCC)	26
