= Atem (album) =

1973 album by Tangerine Dream

- 1973 LP album cover

Studio album by Tangerine Dream
- Released: March 1973
- Recorded: December 1972 – January 1973
- Studio: Dierks Studio
- Genre: Krautrock; space music
- Length: 41:28
- Label: Ohr
- Producer: Tangerine Dream

Tangerine Dream chronology
Zeit (1972)	Atem (1973)	Phaedra (1974)

Atem ([ˈaːtəm], "breath") is the fourth studio album by German electronic music group Tangerine Dream. It was released in March 1973 by record label Ohr.

== Content ==
The music on Atem ranges from slow atmospheric pieces to more aggressive percussion and vocal experiments with dynamic Mellotron orchestrations. Describing its style, AllMusic wrote "Atem is more melodic and less dissonant than Tangerine Dream's other early works. The lineup [...] puts a nice topspin on the old prog rock sound. [...] While it is still very common to see TD listed as progressive rock and art rock, this album is pure space music."

The album marked the end of the band's seminal "Pink Years" period, with future albums adopting a more structured (and commercially viable) sound. Julian Cope's Head Heritage described it as Tangerine Dream's "transitional album".

The baby pictured on the cover is Jerome Froese, the son of Edgar Froese, who would eventually become a member of Tangerine Dream. He was two years and four months old at the time this album was released.

== Release and reception ==
Professional ratings
Review scores
Source	Rating
AllMusic	3/5 stars
Head Heritage	positive

It was largely through DJ John Peel's enthusiastic championing of this album (it was one of his "Albums of the Year" in 1973), that Tangerine Dream first came to the attention of British music listeners in a big way. The public began ordering copies of the group's albums through mail order companies (although Atem, along with Alpha Centauri, did get an official UK release on Polydor around this time). According to legend, it was this mail order activity that caused Richard Branson to take notice.

In its retrospective review, Head Heritage described it as "TD's most adventurous and exhilarating listening experience", and the title track as "TD’s most powerful moment".

== Track listing ==
All tracks are written by Edgar Froese, Christopher Franke and Peter Baumann.

Side A
No.	Title	Length
1.	"Atem"	20:27

Side B
No.	Title	Length
1.	"Fauni-Gena"	10:47
2.	"Circulation of Events"	5:52
3.	"Wahn"	4:29

== Personnel ==
- Edgar Froese – Mellotron, organ, guitar, voice
- Christopher Franke – VCS3, drums, percussion, organ, voice
- Peter Baumann – organ, piano, VCS3
