= Rubycon (album) =

Studio album by Tangerine Dream
- Released: 21 March 1975
- Recorded: January 1975
- Studios: The Manor (Shipton-on-Cherwell, England)
- Genres: Electronic; ambient; kosmische
- Length: 34:53
- Label: Virgin
- Producer: Tangerine Dream

Tangerine Dream chronology
Phaedra (1974)	Rubycon (1975)	Ricochet (1975)

Audio sample
- "Rubycon: Part 1": file; help

Rubycon is the sixth studio album by German electronic music group Tangerine Dream. It was released in 1975 on the Virgin label. It is widely regarded as one of their best albums. Rubycon further develops the Berlin School sequencer-based sound they ushered in with the title track from Phaedra.

Although not quite matching the sales figures for Phaedra, Rubycon reached number 10 in a 14-week run, their highest-charting album in the UK.

== Music ==
The album consists of two long tracks, each just over 17 minutes long. "Rubycon, Part One", the A-side of the LP, "ebbs and flows through tense washes of echo and Mellotron choirs, as primitive sequencer lines bubble to the surface”. The B-side, "Rubycon, Part Two", "opens in a wonderfully haunted way" before "the synthesizer arpeggios return to drive things along".

== Critical reception ==
Professional ratings
Review scores
Source	Rating
AllMusic	4.5/5 stars
Head Heritage	positive

In contemporary reviews, Chris Salewicz of the NME wrote that the album was "a touch more electronically sophisticated than Phaedra [...] perhaps, and the technological massed choir that floods out of the speakers a couple of minutes into Part Two indicates a considerable degree of carefully wired panache." Salewicz summarized the group as being "so thoroughly frustrating because there's nothing you come across which you find you can actively dislike. On the other hand there really does appear to be little there for the moment which warrants more than a luke-warm vague affection that, broken down, would seem close to some nebulous sympathy."

Tom Moon includes Rubycon in his 2008 book 1,000 Recordings to Hear Before You Die, saying: "This voyaging vision of sound, ever-unfolding and not quite ever arriving, has been imitated endlessly since 1975. But somehow its admirers haven't quite captured the openness and faraway grandeur of Tangerine Dream."

In his 1997 book Digital Gothic: A Critical Discography of Tangerine Dream, music journalist Paul Stump praises the album, noting: "Rubycon is simply a refinement of its predecessor—but to an acme of excellence, and demonstrates a mastery of primitive technology breathtaking in its audacity, tenacity and sheer artistic vision. It is probably the best album the band have made..."

In 2025, Jeremy Allen of The Quietus reflected on the album, comparing it to an "epic soundtrack to a great lost film".

== Tour ==
After the album was released, Christopher Franke's Moog synthesizer was damaged in transit during a tour of Australia and when Franke powered it up, for the first time after the journey, he was nearly killed by an electrical shock.

== Track listing ==
No.	Title	Length
1.	"Rubycon, Part I"	17:18
2.	"Rubycon, Part II"	17:35

A new CD version was issued in 2019 re-mastered from the original master tapes. It contained the bonus track "Rubycon (extended introduction)" mixed by Steven Wilson. This track was previously unreleased.

== Personnel ==
Source: Rubycon, Virgin Records, L-35399 & V-2025, liner notes

- Edgar Froese – Mellotron, guitar and VCS 3 synthesizer on "Rubycon, Part One"; organ, Mellotron, guitar, gong and VCS 3 synthesizer on "Rubycon, Part Two"
- Christopher Franke – double Moog synthesizer, Synthi A, organ, modified Elka organ and prepared piano on "Rubycon, Part One"; double Moog synthesizer, gong, Synthi A, and organ on "Rubycon, Part Two"
- Peter Baumann – organ, Synthi A, electric piano (Fender Rhodes) and prepared piano on "Rubycon, Part One"; electric piano (Fender Rhodes), organ, EMS Synthi A, voice and ARP 2600 on "Rubycon, Part Two"

=== Production credits ===
- Monique Froese – photography
- Mick Glossop – engineer
- Roland Paulick – technical assistance

== Charts ==
Chart (1976)	Peak position
Australia (Kent Music Report)	95
UK Albums Chart	10

== Single ==
A single titled Extracts From "Rubycon" was released in March 1975.

No.	Title	Length
1.	"Extracts From "Rubycon""	3:07
2.	"Extracts From "Rubycon""	3:09

Both tracks of this single were included as part of the compilation The Virgin Years 1974–1978 in 2011.
