= Cyclone (Tangerine Dream album) =

Studio album by Tangerine Dream
- Released: 10 March 1978
- Recorded: January 1978 at the Audio Studios, Berlin, Germany
- Genre: Electronic; progressive rock
- Length: 38:33
- Label: Virgin
- Producer: Tangerine Dream

Tangerine Dream chronology
Encore (1977)	Cyclone (1978)	Force Majeure (1979)

Professional ratings
Review scores
Source	Rating
AllMusic	3/5 stars
Sputnikmusic	3/5

Cyclone is the eighth studio album by Tangerine Dream and the first in their canon to feature vocals and lyrics. The cover is a painting by band leader Edgar Froese.

Other Tangerine Dream albums to later include vocals are Tyger (1987), Madcap's Flaming Duty (2007) and Under Cover – Chapter One (2010).

Cyclone reached number 37 on the UK album charts.

== Track listing ==
All tracks are written by Chris Franke, Edgar Froese, Steve Jolliffe.

Side one
No.	Title	Length
1.	"Bent Cold Sidewalk"	13:05
2.	"Rising Runner Missed by Endless Sender"	5:00

Side two
No.	Title	Length
1.	"Madrigal Meridian"	20:28

== Personnel ==
- Edgar Froese – synthesizers, Mellotron, Moog synthesizer, electric guitars, acoustic guitar
- Christopher Franke – Moog, music sequencer, mellotron, synthesizers, electronic drum
- Steve Jolliffe – vocals, flute, piccolo, cor anglais, bass clarinet, Hohner clavinet, synthesizers, grand piano, Fender Rhodes, electric violin, tenor horns, soprano horns, Lyricon
- Klaus Krüger – polyester custom-built drums with multi-trigger unit, electronic drum, Paiste cymbals, bubims, Burma gong set

== Equipment ==
Oberheim 8 Voice polyphonic synth, twin keyboard Mellotron Mark V, Birotron B90, ARP Instruments Digital Soloist synth, Moog synthesizer & Projekt Electronic Time Control System, Gibson Les Paul custom guitars, Korg PS 3100 polyphonic synth, Roland Corporation GS 500 guitar & GR 500 controller, ARP Solina string Ensemble, Ovation Acoustic guitar, Project Electronic sequencer, Computerstudio digital sequencer, loop Mellotron, ARP Soloist synth, Generalmusic Elka string synth, Oberheim OB-1, Hohner clavinet, Grand piano, Fender Rhodes, Roland System-100 synth, bass clarinet, cor anglais, tenor & soprano horns, C-flute, Lyricon by Computone, Polyester custom-built drums with multi-trigger unit, electronic drum, Paiste cymbals, bubims, Burma gong set.

== Charts ==
Chart (1978)	Peak position
Australia (Kent Music Report)	95
UK Albums Chart	37
