= Stratosfear =

- 1976 LP album cover

Studio album by Tangerine Dream
- Released: October 1976
- Recorded: August 1976
- Studios: Audio Studios (Berlin, Germany)
- Genres: Electronic; ambient
- Length: 35:39
- Label: Virgin
- Producer: Tangerine Dream

Tangerine Dream chronology
Ricochet (1975)	Stratosfear (1976)	Sorcerer (1977)

Professional ratings
Review scores
Source	Rating
AllMusic	4.5/5 stars
Christgau's Record Guide	C

Stratosfear is the seventh studio album by the German group Tangerine Dream.

The LP reached No. 39 in the UK, in a 4-week chart run, and eventually reached silver status for selling in excess of 60,000 copies.

== Recording ==
Nick Mason of Pink Floyd did the original mix of Stratosfear in April 1976 at Hansa by the Wall. Due to disputes between Tangerine Dream and Virgin, this mix was abandoned.

Stratosfear combines Tangerine Dream's acoustic and electronic influences more tightly than before. For instance, at the end of the last track, "Invisible Limits", the deep piano/flute tune reveals the album's romantic flavour even after the earlier predominantly synthetic compositions (tracks #1 to last part of track #4). It was Peter Baumann's last studio album with the group.

The album marks the beginning of the band's development away from their uncompromising early 1970s synthesizer experiments toward a recognisably more melodic sound, a trend they would pick up again in 1979's Force Majeure. The title track "Stratosfear" has been played live many times and has been released in a re-mixed form on a number of other albums.

== Critical reception ==
According to Allmusic's John Bush, Stratosfear "shows the group's desire to advance past their stellar recent material and stake out a new musical direction" and also marks "the beginning of a more evocative approach for Tangerine Dream". Bush said that the title track, which begins with a "statuesque synthesizer progression before unveiling an increasingly hypnotic line of trance", is the album's highlight.

Reviewing in Christgau's Record Guide: Rock Albums of the Seventies (1981), Robert Christgau said: "I respect their synthesizer textures in theory, but these guys should leave the accessibility to Kraftwerk. When they program in received semiclassical melodies and set the automatic drummer on 'bouncy swing', the result is the soundtrack for a space travelogue you don't want to see."

== Track listing ==
Side one
No.	Title	Length
1.	"Stratosfear"	10:04
2.	"The Big Sleep in Search of Hades"	4:45

Side two
No.	Title	Length
1.	"3 AM at the Border of the Marsh from Okefenokee"	8:10
2.	"Invisible Limits"	11:40

A new CD version was issued in 2019 re-mastered from the original master tapes. It contained the extra bonus tracks "Coventry Cathedral" (previously unreleased), "Stratosfear" (single edit) and "The Big Sleep in Search of Hades" (single edit) both previously released on promotional only singles in 1976.

== Personnel ==
- Christopher Franke – Moog synthesizer, organ, percussion, loop Mellotron, harpsichord
- Edgar Froese – Mellotron, Moog synthesizer, twelve and six-string guitar, grand piano, bass guitar, mouth organ
- Peter Baumann – Moog synthesizer, Projekt Elektronik rhythm computer, Fender Rhodes, Mellotron

== Single ==
A single was released in 1976 with excerpts from two tracks.

No.	Title	Length
1.	"Stratosfear"	4:14
2.	"The Big Sleep in Search of Hades"	3:50
