= Elka Rhapsody =

Polyphonic multi-orchestral synthesizer

Rhapsody
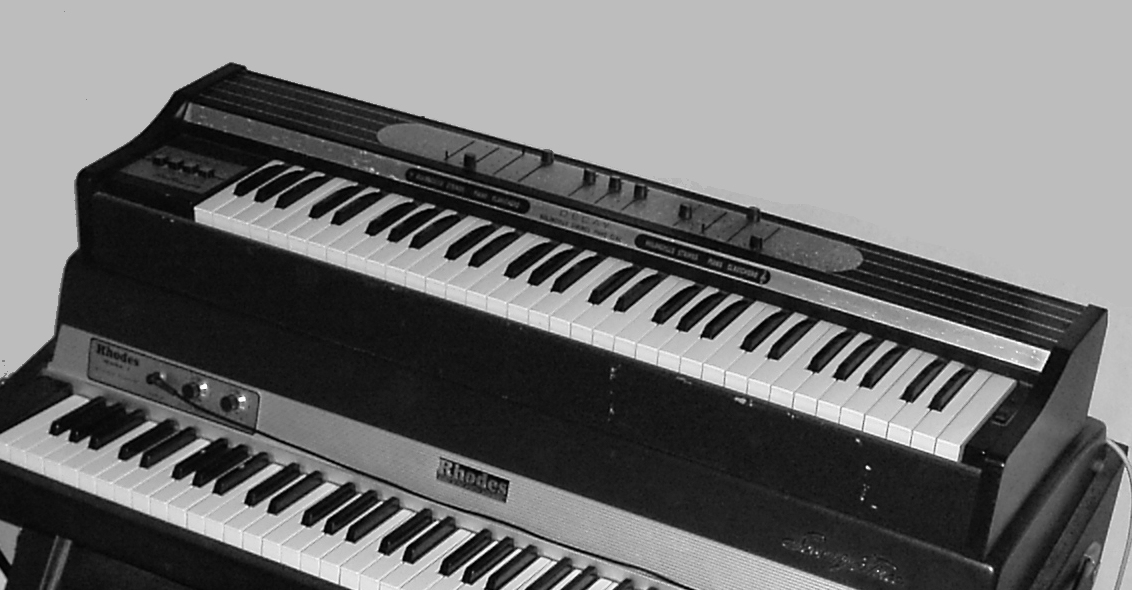
- Elka Rhapsody 610
- Manufacturer: Generalmusic (GEM, LEM, ELKA)
- Dates: 1974–1980
- Price: $800

Technical specifications
- Polyphony: Full
- Oscillator: Sub-octave divider network
- Synthesis type: Analog Subtractive
- Filter: ADSR-Decay
- Storage memory: None
- Effects: Chorus

Input/output
- Keyboard: 49 or 61 keys
- Left-hand control: None

The Elka Rhapsody is a fully polyphonic multi-orchestral combined digital/analog synthesizer with either a 49-key or 61-key keyboard, depending on the model. It was particularly popular with Berlin School electronic musicians during the 1970s.

== Revisions ==
=== Elka Rhapsody 490 ===
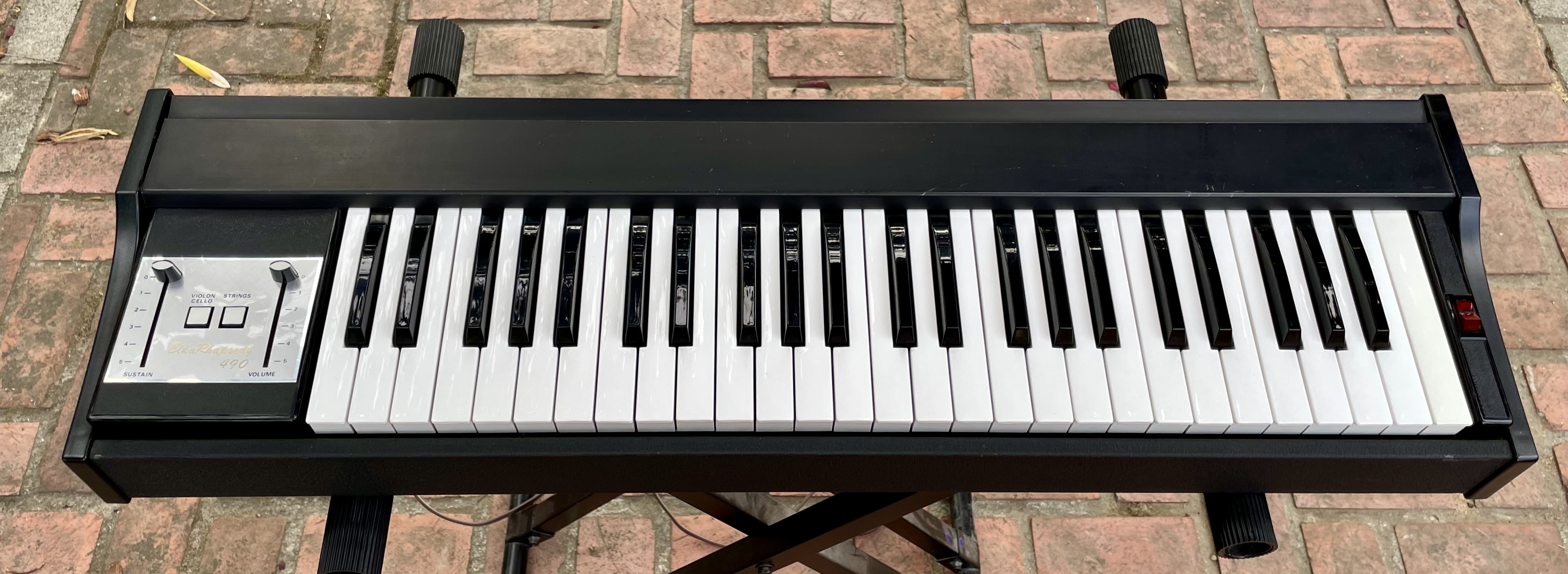
The Elka Rhapsody 490 string synthesizer

This was the earlier, smaller version with 49-key keyboard. It had two sounds, violoncello and strings which could also be combined to produce a fuller sound. There were two other controls; volume and sustain. It also had a master tuning control on the rear panel of the instrument. It is a monotimbral instrument with a single ¼" jack on the rear for output, and a single 5-pin DIN socket for a pedal.

=== Elka Rhapsody 610 ===
This is the larger instrument with a 61-key keyboard. It had four sounds, violoncello, strings, piano and clavichord which could also be switched in and out, similar to the 490. Each voice had separate volume and decay time sliders mounted on the top of the instrument. The 610 had a split function, which would allow one sound - for example, bass - to be assigned to the lower half of the keyboard, while the upper section could play a different lead voice.

== See also ==
- ARP String Ensemble
- String synthesizer
