= Ricochet (Tangerine Dream album) =

- 1975 LP album cover

Live album by Tangerine Dream
- Released: December 1975
- Recorded: 26 October – 2 November 1975, 23 October 1975
- Venues: Fairfield Halls (Croydon, London)
- Studios: The Manor (Shipton-on-Cherwell, England)
- Genres: Electronic; kosmische
- Length: 38:15
- Label: Virgin
- Producer: Tangerine Dream

Tangerine Dream chronology
Rubycon (1975)	Ricochet (1975)	Stratosfear (1976)

Professional ratings
Review scores
Source	Rating
AllMusic	4/5 stars

Ricochet is the seventh major release and first live album by the German electronic music group Tangerine Dream. It was released, on the Virgin label, in 1975. It consists of two side-long compositions mixed from studio recordings and the UK portion of their August–October 1975 European Tour. The sound of the album is similar to that of the group's other "Virgin Years" releases, relying heavily on synthesizers and sequencers to produce a dense, ambient soundscape, but is much more energetic than their previous works. Ricochet uses more percussion and electric guitar than its predecessors Phaedra and Rubycon, and borders on electronic rock. The main innovation on the album is the use of complex, multi-layered rhythms, foreshadowing the band's own direction in the 1980s and trance music and similar genres of electronic dance music.

== Music ==
According to the official In Search of Hades boxed set, Part 1 was entirely recorded at The Manor Studio in England. The opening synthesizer line was based on the opening of the show at the Fairfield Halls in Croydon, but was rerecorded for the album. The rest of Part 1 was entirely created in-studio by the band from several improvised sessions.

Most of Part 2 was recorded at Croydon during Tangerine Dream's live performance there on 23 October 1975. The original, unedited version of this performance can be heard in set 3 (Part 2) of The Bootleg Box Set Vol. 1. No other concerts were recorded for the Ricochet album. The piano solo at the beginning of Part 2 was recorded by Edgar Froese on an old upright piano at The Manor Studio. Immediately after the Croydon concert the band brought a four-track recording of the show to The Manor. Each band member's equipment rig had been recorded on a single channel, and a fourth channel was used for an audience mic to capture crowd noise and overall ambience. The band selected two roughly eight-minute sections from the performance and edited down the individual parts performed by the band members in those sections, mixing each bandmember's parts in and out and panning the tracks to simulate a stereo field. A brief vocal-effects section serves as a bridge between the two live excerpts, which were extracted from different sections of the Croydon performance.

After the Top 20 placings for Phaedra and Rubycon, Ricochet fared less well in sales, spending four weeks on the UK album chart, (all editions of the now defunct British Hit Albums erroneously state only two), reaching number 40.

In the original release of Ricochet, the sound of two hands clapping can be heard at the beginning of the second track. This is the final bit of applause before the music started, and was possibly left as a buffer before the start of the piece. This sound has been edited out in some of the re-released versions of the album, notably Virgin's 1995 "Definitive Edition" CD release, being possibly regarded as noise.

== Critical reception ==
Reviewing the album for AllMusic, Glenn Swan gave the album 4 stars out of five and said, "Electronic trio Tangerine Dream embrace their equipment and take their audience on an actual journey through this especially good, two-part showcase recorded live in France and Britain. Featuring the early and memorable lineup of Chris Franke, Edgar Froese, and Peter Baumann, Ricochet continuously evolves to the next plateau of pulsing experimentation without getting lost or over-indulgent like other bands of the genre. This album finds the three at a time when they knew exactly what they were doing; rocking without the drums, and looking over their shoulder to make sure the audience was still enjoying themselves. For the number of albums and soundtracks this band has put out (over 50!), most fans hold onto this one because it is so energetic and timeless. It takes a snapshot of the band when they were young, influential, and at the height of the genre."

Writing for uDiscoverMusic in 2022, Paul Sexton said, "Ricochet not only sounds remarkably fresh today, but well ahead of its time in the field of electronic experimentation that the band excelled in."

== Track listing ==
Side one
No.	Title	Length
1.	"Ricochet, Part One"	17:02

Side two
No.	Title	Length
1.	"Ricochet, Part Two"	21:13

== Personnel ==
- Peter Baumann – keyboards, organ, synthesizers, Mellotron, flute
- Chris Franke – keyboards, sequencer, synthesizer, drums
- Edgar Froese – keyboards, synthesizer, piano, Mellotron, electric guitar

== Singles ==
7-inch promotional singles were issued in France and Australia, featuring excerpts from the full album:

- "Ricochet (Part I)" – "Ricochet (Part II)"
- "Excerpt from Ricochet"
