= Phaedra (album) =

- 1974 LP album cover, by Edgar Froese

Studio album by Tangerine Dream
- Released: 20 February 1974
- Recorded: November – December 1973
- Studios: The Manor, Shipton-on-Cherwell, England
- Genres: Electronic; kosmische; ambient; space music; progressive electronic
- Length: 37:33
- Label: Virgin
- Producer: Edgar Froese

Tangerine Dream chronology
Atem (1973)	Phaedra (1974)	Rubycon (1975)

Phaedra is the fifth studio album by German electronic music group Tangerine Dream. It was recorded during November 1973 at The Manor in Shipton-on-Cherwell, England and released on 20 February 1974 through Virgin Records. This is the first Tangerine Dream album to feature their now classic sequencer-driven sound, which is considered to have greatly influenced the Berlin School genre.

The album marked the beginning of the group's international success and was their first album released on the Virgin label. It achieved six-figure sales in the UK, reaching number 15 in the UK Albums Chart in a 15-week run, with virtually no airplay, only by strong word of mouth. It also earned the group a gold disc in seven countries, though in their native Germany it sold barely 6,000 units. The album title refers to Phaedra of Greek mythology.

== Background and recording ==
On hearing a set of recordings Edgar Froese and Christopher Franke had made earlier in the year at Skyline Studios in Berlin, Virgin Records' Richard Branson gave them a contract and encouraged them to come to England. After purchasing a modular Moog synthesizer with their advance, in late 1973 the group came to The Manor Studio, in Oxfordshire to begin recording. The entire album was completed in less than six weeks, with some of the music recorded with the help of Froese's wife, Monique. Interviewed by Mark J. Prendergast, Froese recalled:

Phaedra was the first album in which many things had to be structured. The reason was that we were using the Moog sequencer (all driving bass notes) for the first time. Just tuning the instrument took several hours each day, because at the time there were no pre-sets or memory banks. We worked each day from 11 o'clock in the morning to 2 o'clock at night. By the 11th day we barely had 6 minutes of music on tape. Technically everything that could go wrong did go wrong. The tape machine broke down, there were repeated mixing console failures and the speakers were damaged because of the unusually low frequencies of the bass notes. After 12 days of this we were completely knackered. Fortunately, after a two-day break in the countryside a new start brought a breakthrough. "Mysterious Semblance" was recorded on Dec 4th. Pete and Chris were asleep after a long day's recording session so I invited my wife, Monique, into the studio. I called in the studio engineer and recorded it in one take on a double-keyboarded Mellotron while Monique turned the knobs on a phasing device. This piece is on the record exactly as it was recorded that day. And this practice was to continue for the rest of the session.

== Content ==
The title track was originally based on an improvisation recorded in the studio, and unintentionally exhibits one of the limitations of the analog equipment used at the time. As the equipment warmed up, some of the oscillators began to detune (they were highly temperature-sensitive), which was responsible for some of the changes in the music towards the end of the piece.

Both the title track and "Movements of a Visionary" rely on Franke's use of the Moog analog sequencer as a substitute for bass guitar. "Mysterious Semblance at the Strand of Nightmares" features Froese soloing on a Mellotron which is treated by slowly sweeping filter effects. "Sequent C'" is a short piece by Peter Baumann on recorder, with tape echo.

The sleeve design and cover painting are by Froese.

== Style and reception ==
Professional ratings
Review scores
Source	Rating
AllMusic	5/5 stars
Head Heritage	positive
Sputnikmusic	5/5

The All Music Guide to Electronica describes the album as a milestone for the band as "one of the most important, artistic, and exciting works in the history of electronic music". Phaedra is commonly cited as one of Tangerine Dream's best albums and is listed in 1001 Albums You Must Hear Before You Die. In the Q and Mojo Classic Special Edition Pink Floyd & The Story of Prog Rock, the album also came in at 38 in its list of "40 Cosmic Rock Albums".

Writing in his 2000 The Ambient Century, Mark J. Prendergast describes the title track: "At over 17 minutes it conveyed feelings of the cosmos, of giant suns exploding, of huge ocean movements, of mythological lands, of eddies and drifts. Layer upon layer of futuristic sounds piled one on top of the other until the whole thing climaxes in some interstellar void."

The album was reissued in 2025.

== In popular culture ==
The title track and "Mysterious Semblance at the Strand of Nightmares" are both featured in the 2018 interactive Netflix film Black Mirror: Bandersnatch. The protagonist Stefan receives a list of music recommendations, featuring such artists as Edgar Froese, Tangerine Dream, Bauhaus and The Cure. After thumbing through the records in the record shop, Stefan has to decide between two albums: Tangerine Dream's Phaedra and Isao Tomita's The Bermuda Triangle.

== Track listing ==
Side A
No.	Title	Writer(s)	Length
1.	"Phaedra"	Froese, Franke, Baumann	17:39

Side B
No.	Title	Writer(s)	Length
1.	"Mysterious Semblance at the Strand of Nightmares"	Froese	9:55
2.	"Movements of a Visionary"	Froese, Franke, Baumann	7:56
3.	"Sequent C'"	Baumann	2:13

Note: Some CD releases from 1995 and 2005 have slightly different lengths.

A CD remaster was released in 2019, containing bonus stereo remixes of "Phaedra" and "Sequent C" by Steven Wilson.

== Personnel ==
=== Musicians ===
- Edgar Froese – Mellotron, guitar, bass, VCS 3 synthesizer, organ, cover painting
- Christopher Franke – Moog synthesizer, VCS 3 synthesizer
- Peter Baumann – organ, electric piano, VCS 3 synthesizer, recorder

=== Technical ===
- Edgar Froese – producer, cover painting
- Phil Becque – engineer

== Charts ==
Chart (1974)	Peak position
Australia (Kent Music Report)	13
UK Albums Chart	15
US Billboard 200	196

== Single ==
A promotional single was released in 1974, in the U.S., on the Virgin label, with excerpts of two tracks.

No.	Title	Length
1.	"Mysterious Semblance at the Strand of Nightmares"	4:30
2.	"Phaedra"	2:02
