= Divine Comedy in popular culture =

Italian narrative poem in popular culture

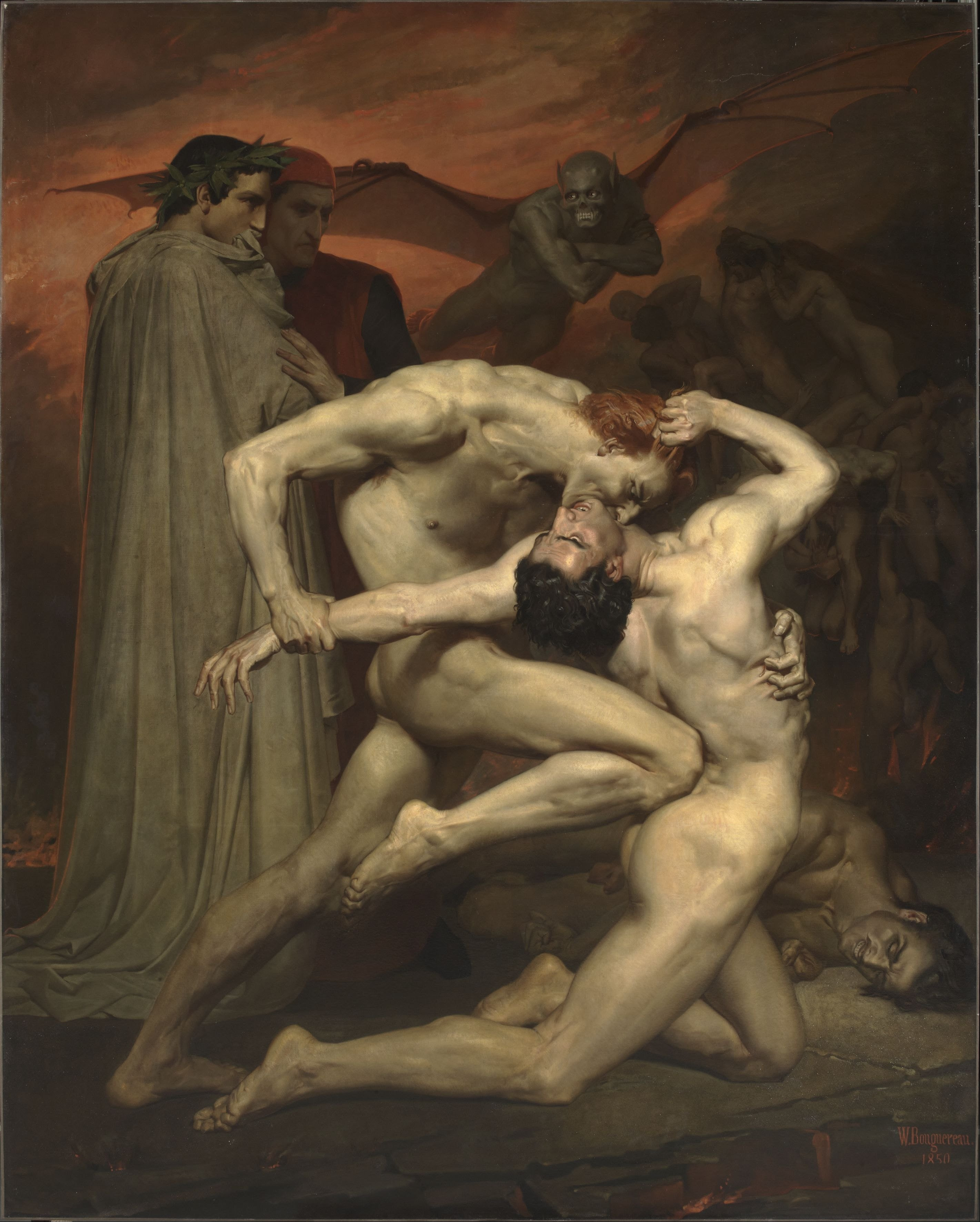
Dante and Virgil, a painting by William-Adolphe Bouguereau (1850), which depicts Dante and Virgil in the eighth circle of Hell, observing two damned souls in eternal combat

The Divine Comedy has been a source of inspiration for artists, musicians, and authors since its appearance in the late 13th and early 14th centuries. Works are included here if they have been described by scholars as relating substantially in their structure or content to the Divine Comedy.

The Divine Comedy (Italian: Divina Commedia) is an Italian narrative poem by Dante Alighieri, begun c. 1308 and completed in 1320, a year before his death in 1321. Divided into three parts: Inferno (Hell), Purgatorio (Purgatory), and Paradiso (Heaven), it is widely considered the pre-eminent work in Italian literature and one of the greatest works of world literature. The poem's imaginative vision of the afterlife is representative of the medieval worldview as it had developed in the Catholic Church by the 14th century. It helped to establish the Tuscan language, in which it is written, as the standardized Italian language.

== Literature ==
=== Medieval ===
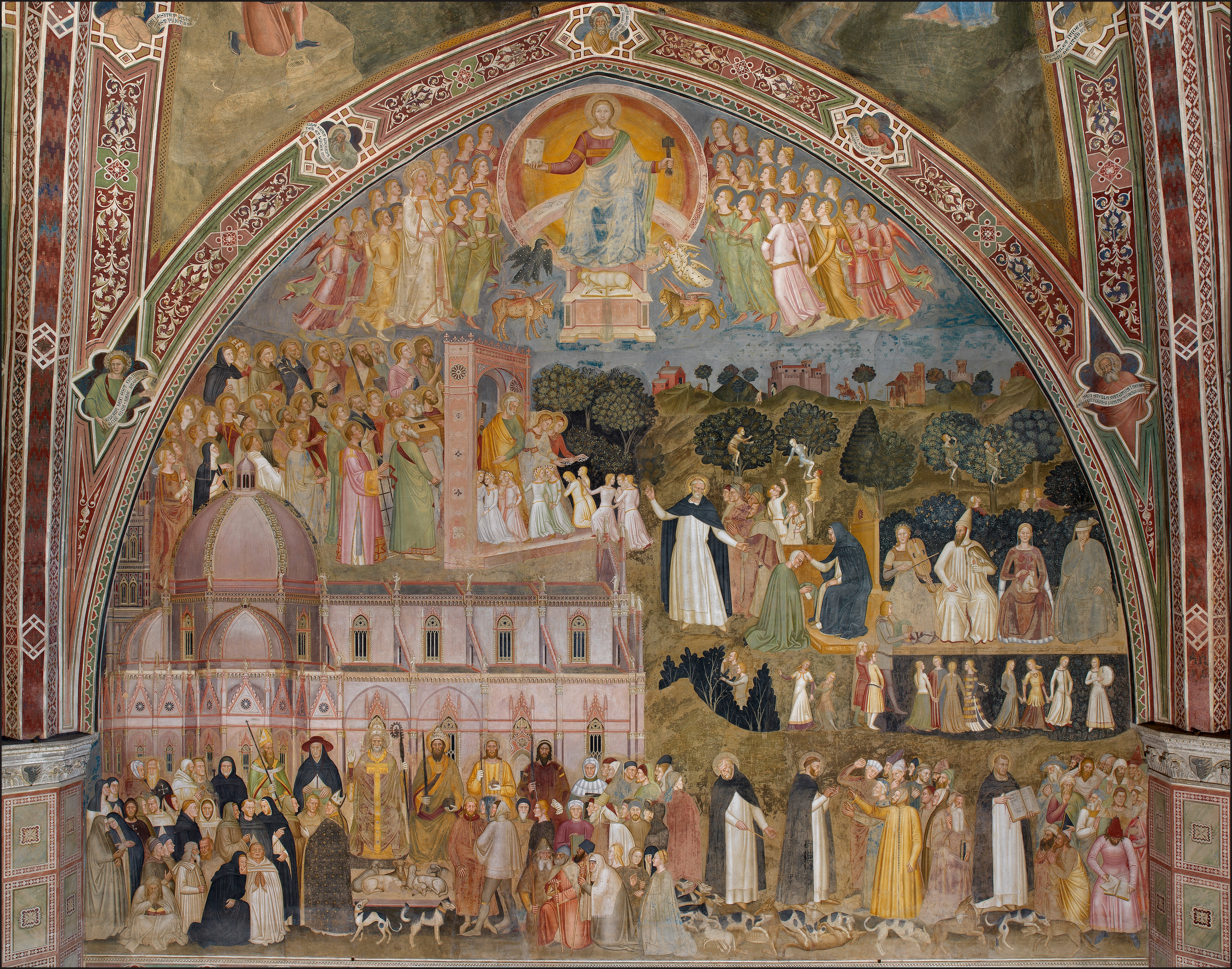
Dante is depicted (bottom, centre) in Andrea di Bonaiuto's 1365 fresco Church Militant and Triumphant in the Santa Maria Novella church, Florence

- In 1373, a little more than half a century after Dante's death, the Florentine authorities softened their attitude to him and decided to establish a department for the study of the Divine Comedy. Giovanni Boccaccio (1313–1375) was appointed to head the department in October 1373, and he sponsored its organization. In January 1374, Boccaccio wrote and delivered a series of lectures on the Comedy. In addition, Boccaccio is included in the work Origine, vita e costumi di Dante Alighieri, where his treatise Trattatello in laude di Dante provides a biography of Dante.
- Geoffrey Chaucer (c. 1343–1400) translated, adapted, and explicitly referred to Dante's work.
  - "A Complaynt to His Lady," an early short poem, is written in terza rima, the rhyme scheme Dante invented for the Comedy.
  - Anelida and Arcite ends with a "compleynt" by Anelida, the lover jilted by Arcite; the compleynt begins with the phrase "So thirleth with the poynt of remembraunce" and ends with "Hath thirled with the poynt of remembraunce," copied from Purgatory 12.32, "la punctura di la rimembranza."
  - The House of Fame, a dream vision in three books in which the narrator is guided through the heavens by an otherworldly guide, has been described as a parody of the Comedy. The narrator echoes Inferno 2.32 in the poem (2.588–592).
  - The Monk's Tale from The Canterbury Tales describes (in greater and more emphatic detail) the plight of Count Ugolino (Inferno, cantos 32 and 33), referring explicitly to Dante's original text in 7.2459–2462.
  - The beginning of the last stanza of Troilus and Criseyde (5.1863-65) is modelled on Paradiso 12.28–30.

=== Early Modern ===
- John Milton finds various uses for Dante, whose work he knew well:
  - Milton refers to Dante's insistence on the separation of worldly and religious power in Of Reformation, where he cites Inferno 19.115–117.
  - Beatrice's condemnation of corrupt and neglectful preachers, Paradiso 29.107–109 ("so that the wretched sheep, in ignorance, / return from pasture, having fed on wind") is translated and adapted in Lycidas 125–126, "The hungry Sheep look up, and are not fed, / But swoln with wind, and the rank mist they draw," when Milton condemns corrupt clergy.

=== Nineteenth century ===
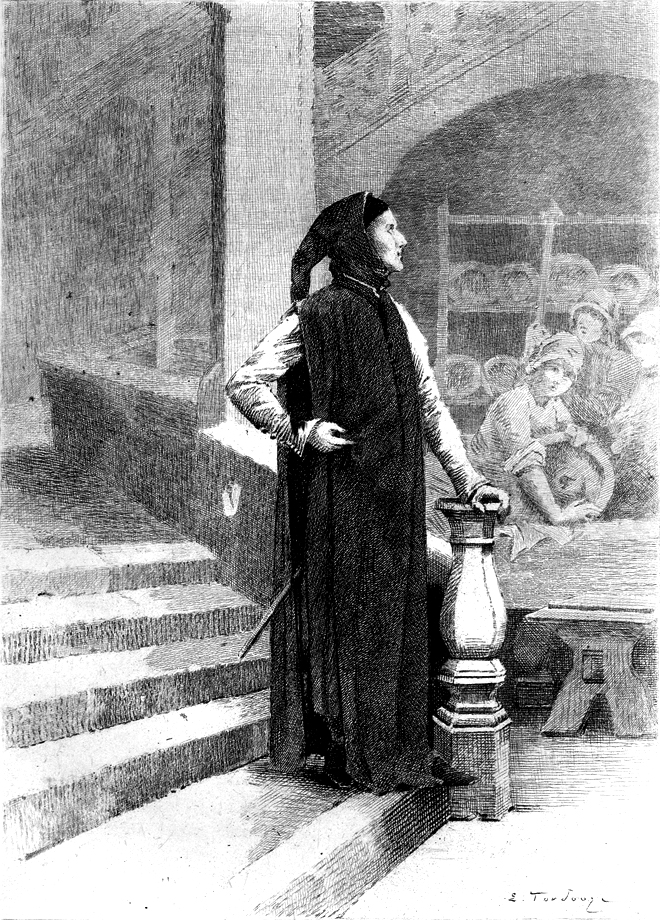
Dante appears in Honoré de Balzac's 1831 novel Les Proscrits

- The title of Honoré de Balzac's work La Comédie humaine (the "Human Comedy," 1815–1848) is usually considered a conscious adaptation of Dante's.
- Henry Wadsworth Longfellow, who translated the Divine Comedy into English, wrote a poem titled "Mezzo Cammin" ("Halfway," 1845), alluding to the first line of the Comedy, and a sonnet sequence (of six sonnets) under the title "Divina Commedia" (1867); these were published as flyleaves to his translation.
- Karl Marx uses a paraphrase of Purgatory (V, 13) to conclude the preface to the first edition of Das Kapital (1867), as a kind of motto: "Segui il tuo corso, e lascia dir le genti" ("follow your own road, and let the people talk").
- Lesya Ukrainka's poem "The Forgotten Shadow" (1898) is a feminist reinterpretation of Dante and Beatrice. The forgotten shadow in the poem is Gemma Donati, Alighieri's wife.

=== Twentieth century ===
- In E. M. Forster's novel Where Angels Fear to Tread (1905), the character of Gino Carella, upon first introducing himself, quotes the first lines of Inferno (the novel includes several references to Dante's La Vita Nuova as well).
- T. S. Eliot cites Inferno, XXVII, 61–66, as an epigraph to "The Love Song of J. Alfred Prufrock" (1915). Eliot cites heavily from and alludes to Dante in Prufrock and Other Observations (1917), Ara vus prec (1920), and The Waste Land (1922).
- Begun in 1916, Ezra Pound's Cantos take the Comedy as a model.
- Samuel Beckett in his non-fiction essay "Dante... Bruno. Vico.. Joyce", published in Our Exagmination Round His Factification for Incamination of Work in Progress (1929), compares Joyce's reassessments of the conventions of the English language to Dante's departure from Latin and synthesis of Italian dialects in the Divine Comedy.
- In Jorge Luis Borges's 1945 short story The Aleph, the protagonist mourns the recent death of Beatriz Viterbo, whom he loved, at the beginning and meets his cousin Carlos Argentino Daneri, whose name originated from combining Dante Alighieri's name and last name. Also, the Aleph is found in the nineteenth step in the basement, which matches the XIX canto of Paradise, which contains a description similar to that of the Aleph.
- Turkish poet Cahit Sıtkı Tarancı's famous poem "Otuz Beş Yaş" (lit. "Thirty Five Years") is beginning with the verses which contains a citation of Inferno: "Yaş otuz beş! Yolun yarısı eder / Dante gibi ortasındayız ömrün" ("Age thirty five! It is half of way / We are in the middle of life like Dante") won the Best Turkish Poem Prize in 1946.
- Primo Levi cites Dante's Divine Comedy in the chapter called "Canto of Ulysses" in his novel Se questo è un uomo (If This Is a Man) (1947), published in the United States as Survival in Auschwitz, and in other parts of this book; the fires of Hell are compared to the "real threat of the fires of the crematorium."
- Malcolm Lowry paralleled Dante's descent into hell with Geoffrey Firmin's descent into alcoholism in his epic novel Under the Volcano (1947). In contrast to the original, Lowry's character explicitly refuses grace and "chooses hell," though Firmin does have a Dr. Vigil as a guide (and his brother, Hugh Firmin, quotes the Comedy from memory in ch. 6).
- The seventh and last chapter from Leopoldo Marechal's first novel, Adam Buenosayres (1948), is a parody of the Inferno, entitled "Journey To The Dark City Of Cacodelphia", wherein the titular character meets several of his literary contemporaries (including his guide).
- Poet Derek Walcott, in 1949, published Epitaph for the Young: XII Cantos, which he later acknowledged as influenced by Dante.
- Jorge Luis Borges, who wrote extensively about Dante, included two short texts in his Dreamtigers (El Hacedor, 1960): "Paradiso, XXXI, 108" and "Inferno, I, 32," which paraphrase and comment on Dante's lines.
- African-American author LeRoi Jones, in 1965, published the novel The System of Dante's Hell, in which a young African-American man lives nomadically in the Southern United States, struggling with segregation and racism. The book correlates the man's experience with Dante's Inferno, and includes a diagram of the fictional hell described by Dante.
- Aleksandr Solzhenitsyn's novel The First Circle (1968) takes its title from the Inferno. Set in a special Gulag for scientists, it parallels Dante's First Circle (Limbo) where virtuous philosophers of antiquity are separated from God and humanity but not punished in any other way.
- James Merrill published his Divine Comedies, a collection of poetry, in 1976; a selection in that volume, "The Book of Ephraim", consists "of conversations held, via the Ouija board, with dead friends and spirits in 'another world.'"
- Authors Larry Niven and Jerry Pournelle wrote a modern sequel to the Inferno, Inferno (1976), in which a science fiction author dies during a fan convention and finds himself in Hell, where Benito Mussolini functions as his guide. They wrote a subsequent sequel to their own work, Escape from Hell (2009).
- Gloria Naylor's Linden Hills (1985) uses Dante's Inferno as a model for the trek made by two young black poets who spend the days before Christmas doing odd jobs in an affluent African American community. The young men soon discover the price paid by the inhabitants of Linden Hills for pursuing the American dream.
- Author Monique Wittig's Virgile, Non (published in English as Across the Acheron, 1985) is a lesbian–feminist parody of the Divine Comedy set in the utopia/dystopia of second-wave feminism.
- Steve Tidrick used the nine circles of Dante's hell as an analogy to explain the United States federal budget in his cover story in The New Republic entitled "The Budget Inferno" (May 29, 1995), which was republished in The New Republic Guide to the Issues: the ‘96 Campaign (Basic Books, 1996).
- Mark E. Rogers used the structure of Dante's hell in his 1998 comedic novel Samurai Cat Goes to Hell (the last in the Samurai Cat series), and includes the trope of a gate to hell with an "abandon hope" inscription.

=== Twenty-first century ===
- Irish poet Seamus Heaney published a poem, "A Dream of Solstice", on the front page of the Irish Times (18 January 2000) that begins with a translation of Paradiso 33.58–61 as "Like somebody who sees things when he's dreaming / And after the dream lives with the aftermath / Of what he felt, no other trace remaining, / So I live now".
- Nick Tosches's In The Hand of Dante (2002) weaves a contemporary tale about the finding of an original manuscript of the Divine Comedy with an imagined account of Dante's years composing the work.
- Inferno by Peter Weiss (written in 1964, published in 2003) is a play inspired by the Comedy, the first part of a planned trilogy.
- The Dante Club is a 2003 novel by Matthew Pearl that tells the story of various American poets translating The Divine Comedy in post-civil war Boston, who must also investigate murders being committed based on the punishments in the text, due to their desire to protect Dante's reputation and the fact that only they have the necessary expertise to understand the murderer's motivations.
- Óscar Esquivias in his trilogy of novels Inquietud en el Paraíso (2005), La ciudad del Gran Rey (2006) and Viene la noche (2007) shows his personal vision of Dante's Divine Comedy.
- In the novel The Tenth Circle (2006) by Jodi Picoult, the main character's comic strip, The Tenth Circle, is based on the Inferno.
- Dante himself is a character in The Master of Verona (2007), a novel by David Blixt that combines the people of Dante's time with the characters of Shakespeare's Italian plays.
- Sylvain Reynards' 2011 novel Gabriel's Inferno was inspired by the relationship between Dante and Beatrice.
- Adam Roberts' Purgatory Mount is a 2021 science fiction novel that features a huge mountain on a distant planet resembling Dante's Mount Purgatory.

== Visual arts ==
=== Sculpture ===
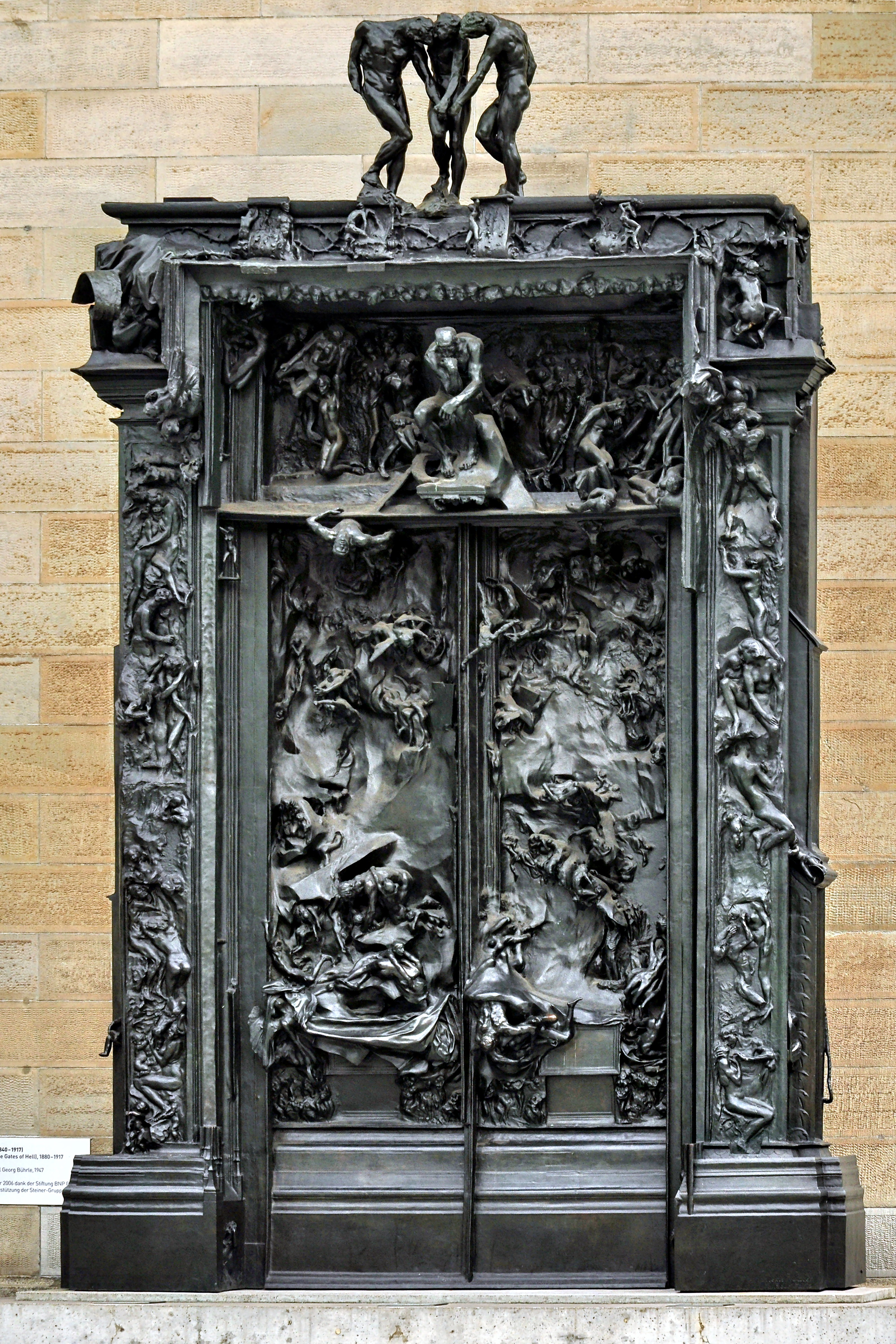
Auguste Rodin's sculpture The Gates of Hell, Musée Rodin

- Jean-Baptiste Carpeaux's sculpture Ugolino and His Sons is based on the account of Count Ugolino in Inferno Canto XXXIII.
- Auguste Rodin's sculptural group The Gates of Hell draws heavily on the Inferno. The component sculpture, Paolo and Francesca, represents Francesca da Rimini and Paolo Malatesta, whom Dante meets in Canto 5. The version of this sculpture known as The Kiss shows the book that Paolo and Francesca were reading. Other component sculptures include Ugolino and his children (Canto 33) and The Shades, who originally pointed to the phrase "Lasciate ogne speranza, voi ch'entrate" ("Abandon all hope, ye who enter here") from Canto 3. Sculptures of Grief and Despair cannot be assigned to particular sections of the Inferno, but are in keeping with the overall theme. The famous component sculpture The Thinker, near the top of the gate, and also produced as an independent work, may represent Dante himself.
- Timothy Schmalz created a series of 100 sculptures, one for each canto, on the 700th anniversary of the date of Dante’s death.

=== Illustrations ===
- Giovanni di Paolo illuminated Dante's Paradiso with 61 miniature tempera paintings in the 1440s.
- Sandro Botticelli made the most famous set of illustrations during the Renaissance for a manuscript of the Divine Comedy commissioned by Lorenzo Pierfrancesco de' Medici; Botticelli also designed a series of illustrations for the 1481 edition of the poem.
- Stradanus prepared a series of illustrations of Inferno.
- A commentary by La Comedia di Dante Alighieri con la nova esposizione written by Alessandro Vellutello and printed in 1544 by Francesco Marcolini, was illustrated with 87 engravings, possibly by Giovanni Britto.
- John Flaxman's set of one hundred and eleven illustrations were influential across Europe on artists such as Goya and Ingres, because of their radically minimalist style.
- William Blake planned and executed several watercolour illustrations to the Divine Comedy, including The Wood of the Self-Murderers: The Harpies and the Suicides. Though he did not finish the series before his death in 1827, they offer a powerful visual interpretation of the poem.
- Gustave Doré made the most famous illustrations in the 19th century; the plates were drawn in 1857, and published in 1860 with Henry Francis Cary's translation.
- Franz von Bayros illustrated a 1921 edition in colour.
- Salvador Dalí made a series of prints for the Comedy in 1950–51.
- British artist Tom Phillips illustrated his own translation of the Inferno, published in 1985, with four illustrations per canto.
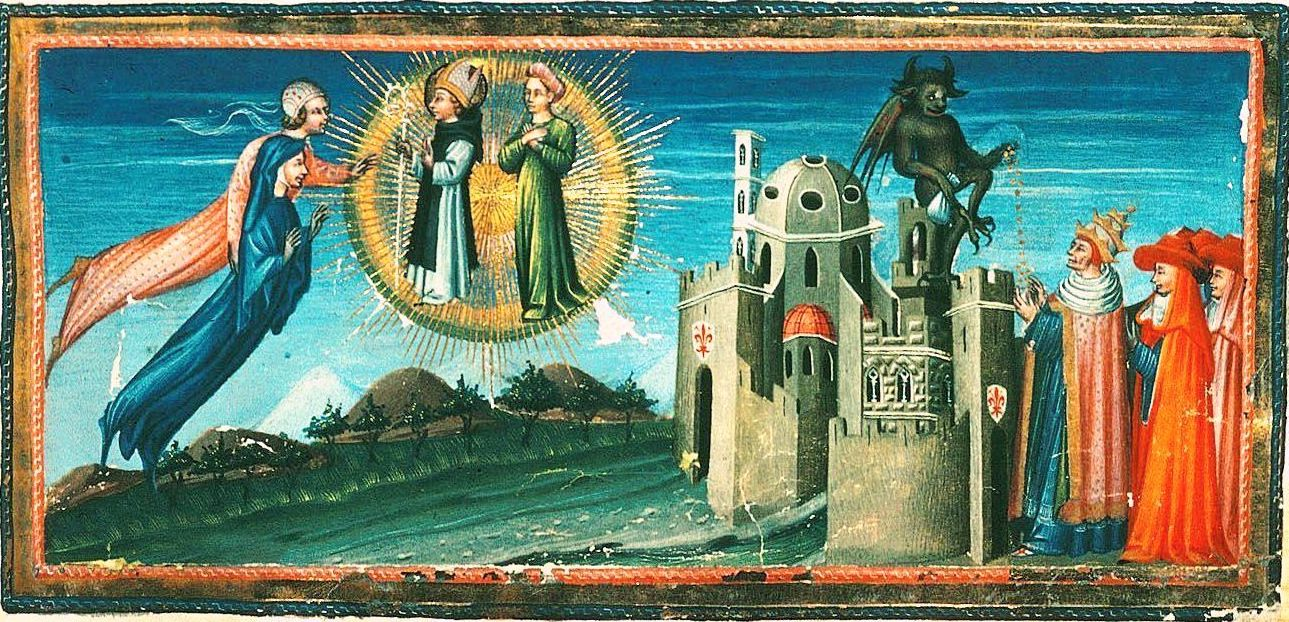
Paradiso: Dante and Beatrice meet Folco of Marseille, who denounces corrupt churchmen. Giovanni di Paolo, 1444–1450

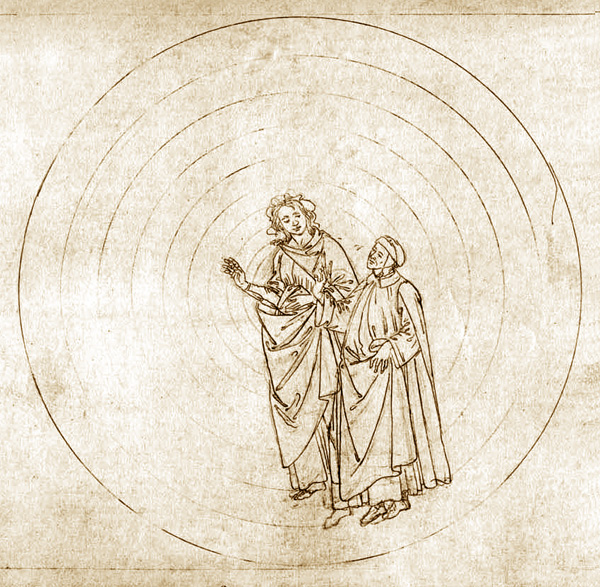
Paradiso, Canto IX. Sandro Botticelli, 1485–1490

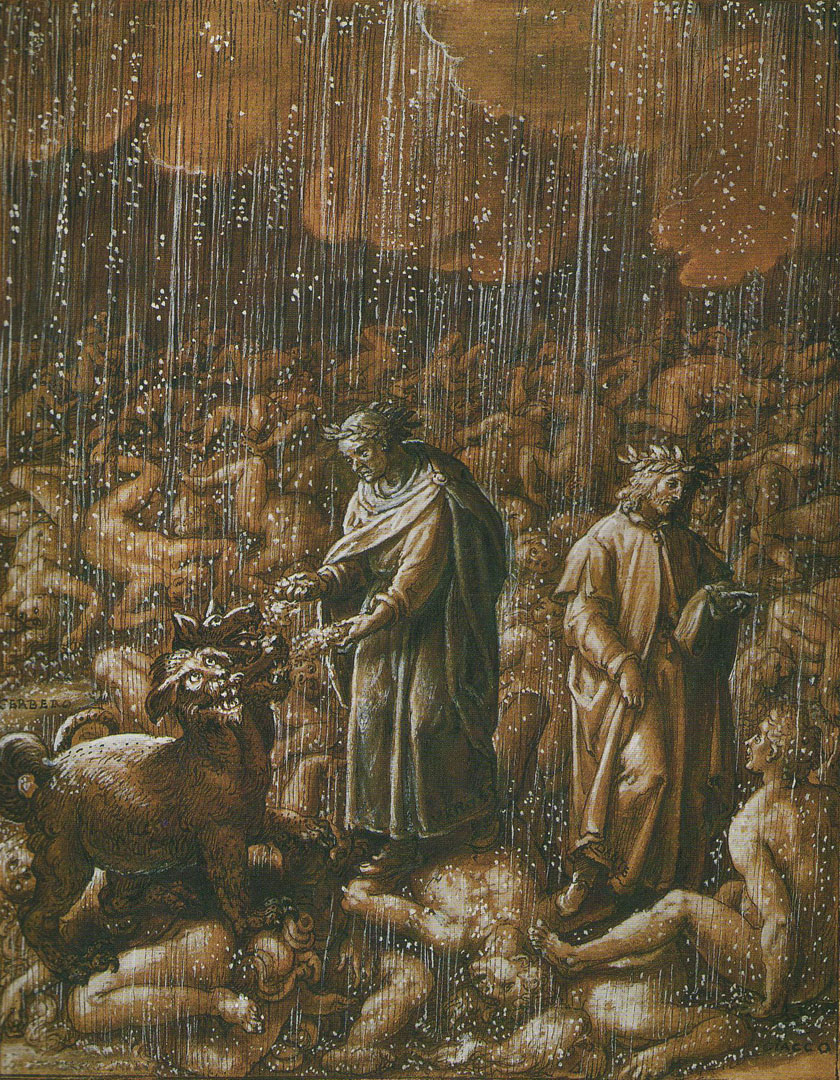
Inferno, Canto VI. Dante and Virgil meet Cerberus. Stradanus, 1587

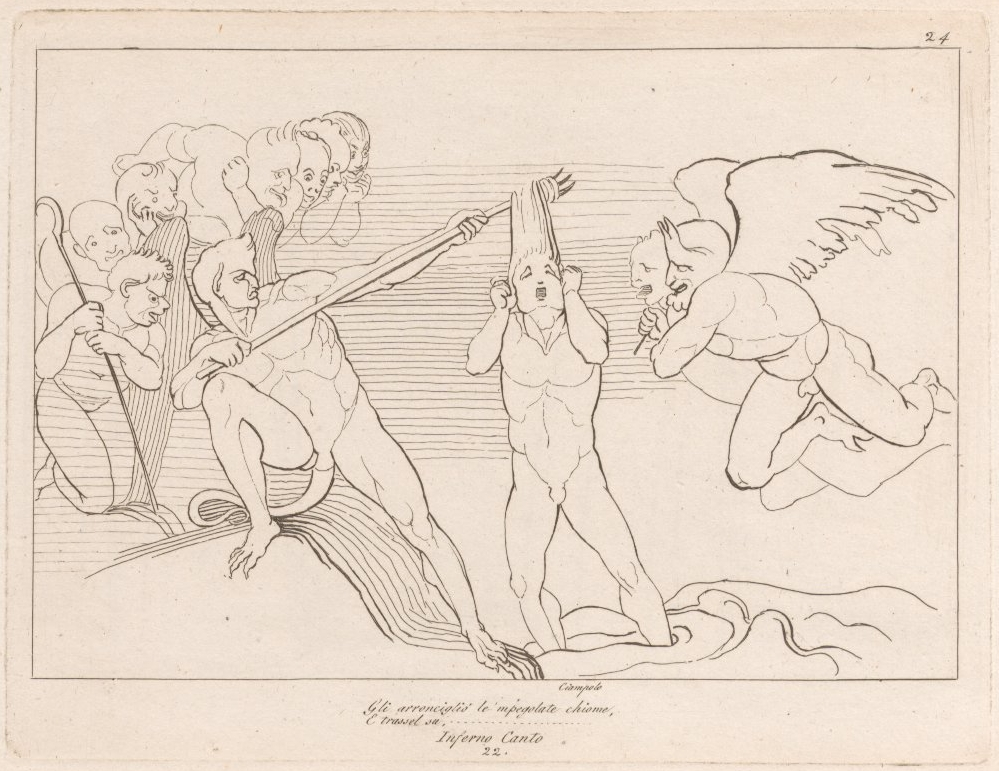
Gli arroncigliò le impegolate, Inferno, Canto XXII. John Flaxman, 1793

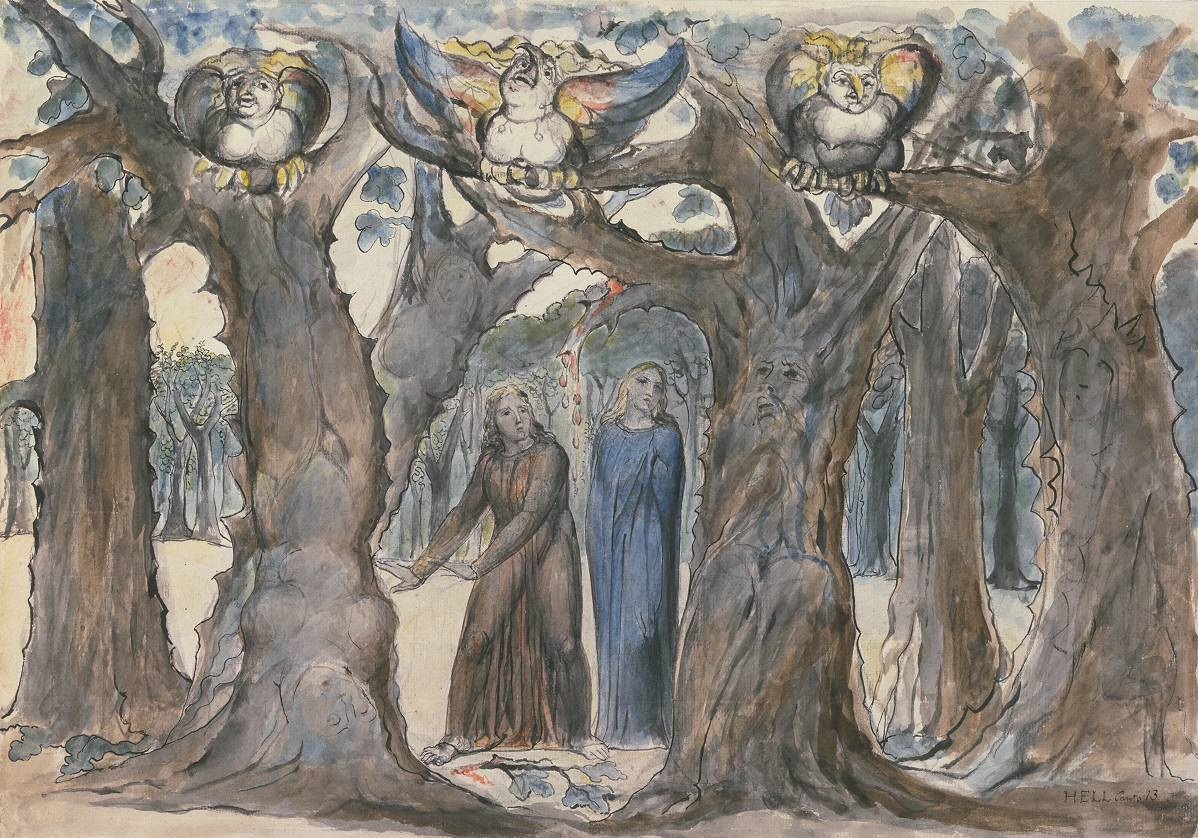
The Wood of the Self-Murderers: The Harpies and the Suicides. William Blake, 1824–1827

=== Painting ===
- Michelangelo's The Last Judgment depicts Charon and King Minos as they are described in the Inferno.
- Eugène Delacroix made his name with The Barque of Dante (1822), a painting depicting Dante and Virgil crossing the river Styx.
- Joseph Anton Koch illustrated Dante's Divine Comedy and in the period 1824–1829 painted the four frescoes in the Dante Room of Casa Massimo.
- William-Adolphe Bouguereau, the prolific 19th-century academic artist, painted Dante And Virgil In Hell in 1850.
- Dante Gabriel Rossetti, a Pre-Raphaelite, made several paintings of the Divine Comedy, including Dante's Vision of Rachel and Leah (1855, for Purgatorio XXVII), Pia de' Tolomei, his largest painting Dante's Dream at the Time of the Death of Beatrice (1871), and Beata Beatrix (1872).
- Henry Holiday is best known for his 1884 painting Dante and Beatrice.
- Graba' made a cycle La Divina Commedia consisting of 111 paintings in 2003 exhibited in the Art Hall Sint-Pietersabdij in Ghent.
- Luke Chueh made a series of paintings based on the Inferno in 2009 exhibited in Gallery 1988.
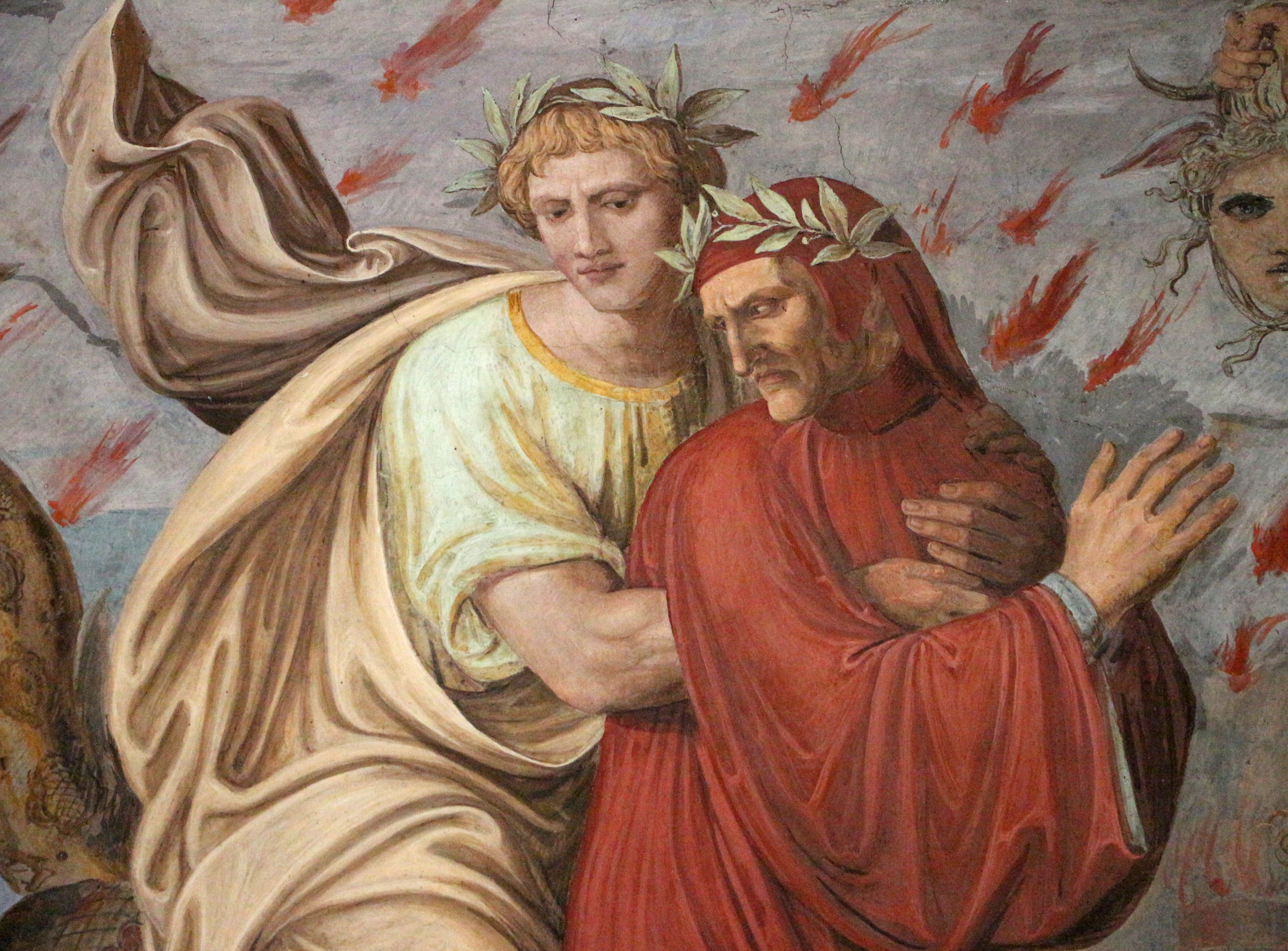
Dante and Virgil in the Inferno. Fresco in Casa Massimo, Joseph Anton Koch, 1825-1828

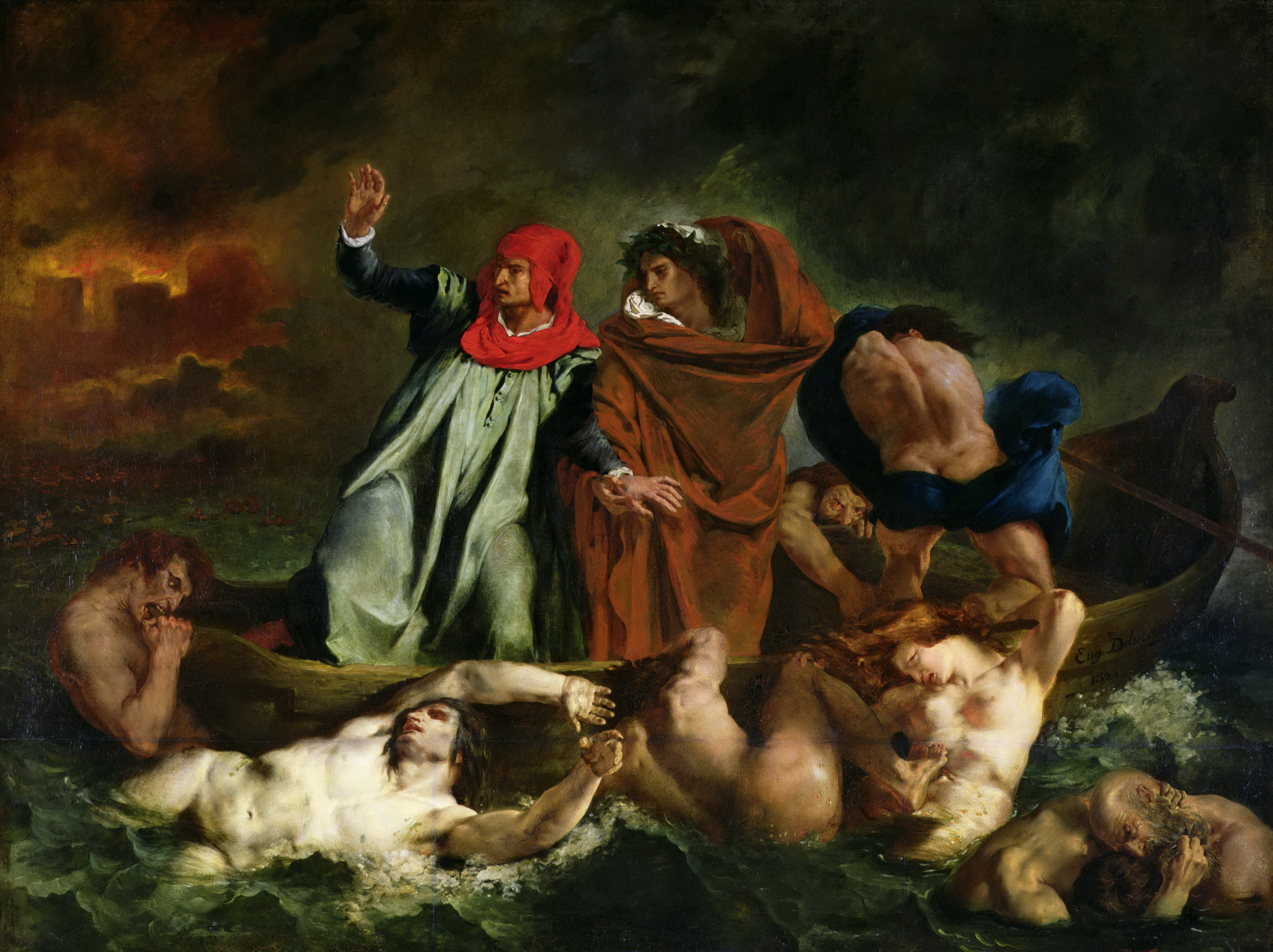
The Barque of Dante. Eugène Delacroix, 1822

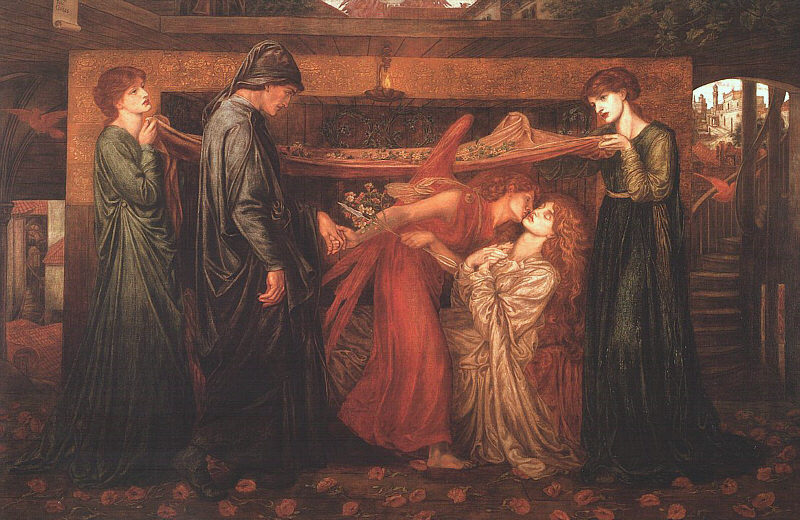
Dante's Dream at the Time of the Death of Beatrice, Dante Gabriel Rossetti, 1871

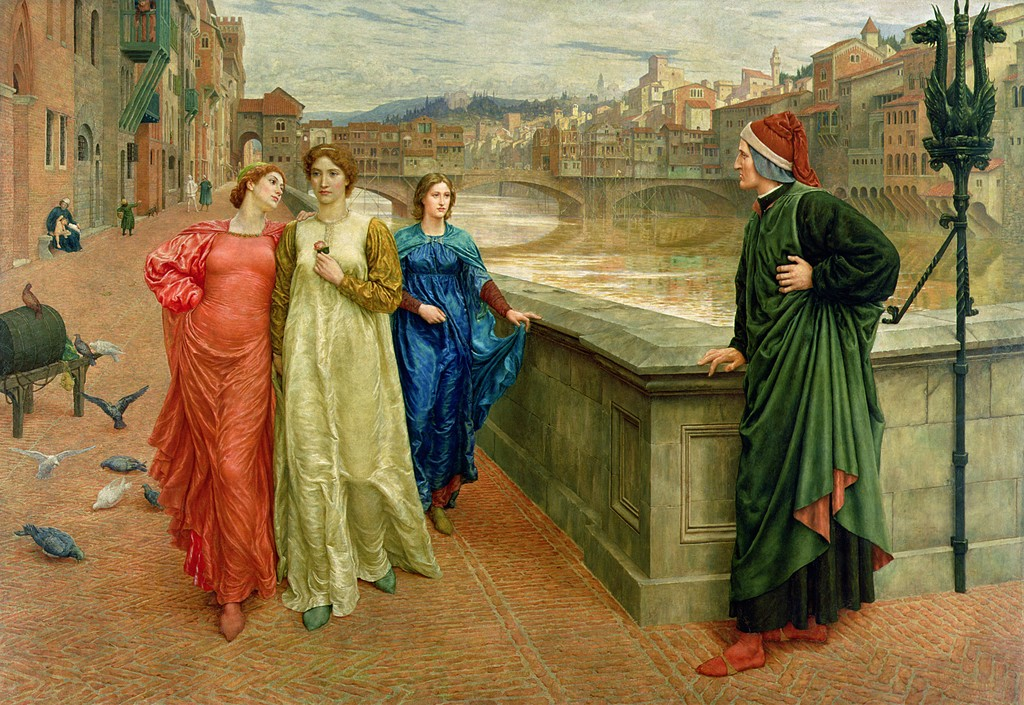
Dante and Beatrice. Henry Holiday, 1884

=== Architecture ===
- The Palacio Barolo in Buenos Aires, completed in 1923, was designed in accordance with the cosmology of Dante's Divine Comedy, motivated by Italian architect Mario Palanti's admiration for Dante.
- The Danteum is an unbuilt monument designed by the Italian modernist architect Giuseppe Terragni in 1938 at the behest of Benito Mussolini's fascist dictatorship.

== Performing arts ==
=== Dance ===
- Edward Watson and Sarah Lamb as Dante and Beatrice in "Paradiso", the final section of The Dante Project, 2021
  In 2021, the Royal Opera House put on The Dante Project, choreographed by Wayne McGregor to new music composed and conducted by Thomas Adès, with set and costumes by Tacita Dean. It was danced by The Royal Ballet, led by its principal dancer Edward Watson as Dante, in his final appearance after 20 years working with and interpreting McGregor. The music was performed live by an orchestra of 75 musicians. Sarah Crompton called the work "bold, beautiful, emotional and utterly engaging". The dance is in three sections. "Inferno" shows Dante's journey to hell, guided by Virgil, in "remarkably free and inventive" choreography, "rich in feeling". "Purgatorio" shows Dante meeting two incarnations of his young self, and three of the woman he loves, Beatrice. Watson dances with the living Beatrice (Francesca Hayward) "in lovely, poetic flow", and then with the heavenly Beatrice (Sarah Lamb) "all unfolding limbs and ethereal gestures". "Paradiso" has Dante in heaven with the dancers skittering about the stage all in white, in what Crompton calls a mood "of abstracted joy, deep but dazzling".

=== Opera ===
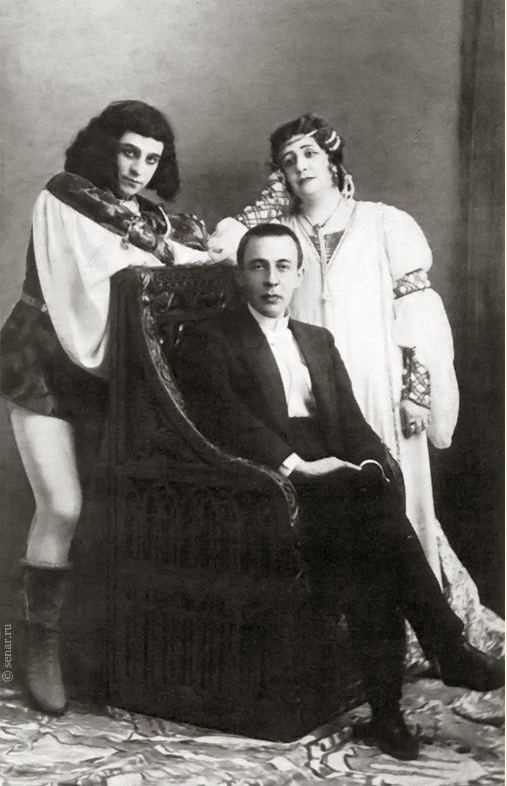
Sergei Rachmaninoff with members of the premiere cast of his opera Francesca da Rimini in 1906

- In Claudio Monteverdi's 1607 opera L'Orfeo, the title character is bombarded with the famous line Lasciate ogni speranza voi ch'entrate as he attempts to enter the underworld.
- Gaetano Donizetti's 1837 opera Pia de' Tolomei centers around the life of the titular Pia de' Tolomei as mentioned in Purgatorio Canto V.
- Numerous mainly 19th century operas treat the story of Francesca da Rimini, many of them including those by Pellico (1818), Strepponi (1823), Carlini, Mercadante, Quilici, Generali, Staffa, Manna, Fournier, Tamburini, Borgatta, Morlacchi, Papparlardo, Nordal, Maglioni, Bellini, DeVasinis, Meiners (1841), Cannetti, Brancaccio, Rolland, Ruggieri, Pinelli, Franchini, Meiners (again, this time in 1860), Gilson, Sescewich, Boullard, Marcarini, Moscuzza, Goetz, Cagnoni, Thomas, Impallomeni, Gilson, Nápravník, Rachmaninov (in 1906), Leoni, Zandonai (1914, based on the 1901 play by Gabriele D'Annunzio), and Henried (in 1920) all having that same title.
- Benjamin Godard's Dante et Béatrice from 1890 depicts Dante not as a famous poet, but as a young man implicated in political and love intrigues in his quest for Beatrice.
- Gianni Schicchi, one of the operas making up Giacomo Puccini's Il Trittico alongside Il Tabarro and Suor Angelica, centers around an incident concerning the titular Gianni Schicchi de' Cavalcanti mentioned in Inferno Canto XXX.
- Louis Andriessen's 2008 opera La Commedia is a retelling of The Divine Comedy.
- Lucia Ronchetti's 2021 opera Inferno is based on the Inferno section of The Divine Comedy. Its libretto consists mostly of Dante's original writing as compiled by the composer.

=== Classical music ===
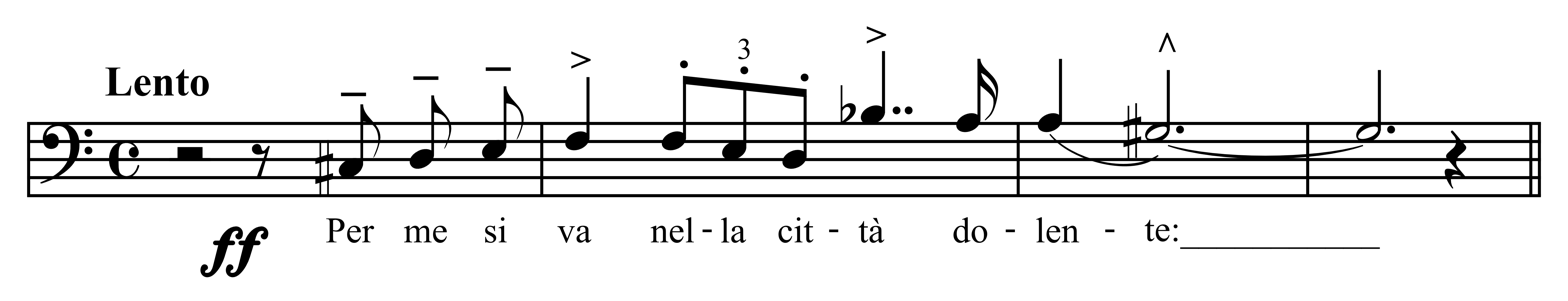
The first of three themes in Liszt's Dante Symphony for the Gates of Hell. It begins in D minor and ends ambiguously on G♯, a tritone higher.

By 1995, the Divine Comedy had been set to music over 120 times; Gioacchino Rossini created two such settings. Only 8 of the settings are of the complete Commedia, "the most famous" being Liszt's symphony; others have composed music for some of Dante's characters, while yet others have set passages of the Commedia to music.

- Franz Liszt's Symphony to Dante's Divina Commedia (completed 1856) has two movements: "Inferno" and "Purgatorio." A concluding "Magnificat" is included at the end of the "Purgatorio" movement and replaces the planned third movement, which was to be called "Paradiso" (Liszt was dissuaded by Richard Wagner from his original plan). Liszt also composed a Dante Sonata (started 1837, completed 1849).
- Pyotr Ilich Tchaikovsky's 1876 Francesca da Rimini (subtitled "Symphonic Fantasy After Dante") is a symphonic poem based on an episode in the fifth canto of the Inferno.
- The text of the short prayer from the opening lines of Canto 33 of Paradiso was set to music for a cappella women's voices by Giuseppe Verdi. Composed between 1886 and 1888, "Laudi alla Vergine Maria" (Praises to the Virgin Mary), the third movement of his Four Sacred Pieces was one of the last pieces written before his death.
- Henry Barraud's cantata for five voices and 15 instruments, La divine comédie, based on Dante's text, was composed in 1972.
- Dutch composer Louis Andriessen's 2008 film opera in five parts La Commedia incorporates texts from Vondel and the Old Testament, in addition to The Divine Comedy. The five parts are "The City of Dis, or The Ship of Fools", "Racconto dall'Inferno", "Lucifer", "The Garden of Delights", and "Luce Etterna".

=== Popular music ===
- The song "Canto IV (Limbo)" from Progressive music group Discipline's 1997 album Unfolded Like Staircase describes the sorrow of those souls who never knew a deity.
- Tangerine Dream has released albums setting all the three parts of The Divine Comedy to music: Inferno is a recording of a live performance at the St. Marien zu Bernau Cathedral in 2001, and Purgatorio and Paradiso are studio albums from 2004 and 2006 respectively.
- German Dark Electro band yelworC has made two albums of a trilogy based on the three canticas of the Divine Comedy, Trinity, released in 2004 from material partially composed in the 90s, and Icolation, released in 2007.
- Brazilian metal band Sepultura’s 2006 album Dante XXI is a concept album based on the Divine Comedy, which lead vocalist Derrick Green had read in high school and suggested to the band.
- American progressive metal band Symphony X's 2015 album Underworld is based on the Inferno.
- American singer-songwriter Ethel Cain's debut album Preacher's Daughter (2022) contains the song "Ptolemaea", named after one of the four concentric rings of the Ninth Circle of Hell, as depicted in the Inferno.
- Irish Musician Hozier's third studio album Unreal Unearth (2023) is inspired by Inferno. Each song signifies Dante's journey through one of the nine circles of Hell and his ascent on the other side.

=== Radio ===
- Inferno Revisited, a modernised interpretation of Dante written by Peter Howell, was first broadcast on BBC Radio 4 on 17 April 1983.
- Between March and April 2014, the BBC adapted The Divine Comedy for Radio 4, starring Blake Ritson and John Hurt playing younger and older versions of Dante.

=== Film ===
L'Inferno (1911)

- The 1911 silent film L'Inferno was directed by Giuseppe de Liguoro, starring Salvatore Papa. It was released on DVD in 2004, with a soundtrack by Tangerine Dream.
- The 1924 silent film Dante's Inferno, directed by Henry Otto, features the 1911 film, L'Inferno; the section on the inferno is reduced to a ten-minute segment.
- The 1935 motion picture Dante's Inferno, directed by Harry Lachman, written by Philip Klein and starring Spencer Tracy, is about a fairground attraction based on Inferno. The film features a 10-minute fantasy sequence visualizing Dante's Inferno.
- The 1975 Pier Paolo Pasolini film Salò, or the 120 Days of Sodom is set in four segments inspired by Dante's Divine Comedy: the Anteinferno, the Circle of Manias, the Circle of Shit and the Circle of Blood.
- Stan Brakhage's eight-minute hand-painted film, The Dante Quartet (1987), is inspired by the Divine Comedy.
- Peter Greenaway adapted Cantos I to VIII for BBC Two as A TV Dante (1987–1990).
- Krzysztof Kieślowski planned to create a new trilogy inspired by Dante's The Divine Comedy after finishing The Three Colors Trilogy (1993–1994). This intention, however, was abandoned after his death in 1996 until Tom Tykwer decided to shoot the film Heaven in 2002, using Kieslowski's original screenplay. In 2005, Bosnian director Danis Tanović directed Hell (French) based on Kieslowski's screenplay sketches. The screenplay was completed by Krzysztof Piesiewicz, Kieslowski's screenwriter.
- The motion picture Se7en (1995) stars Brad Pitt and Morgan Freeman as two detectives who investigate a series of ritualistic murders inspired by the seven deadly sins. The film makes many references to Dante's Divine Comedy.
- Ridley Scott's 2001 film Hannibal has Hannibal Lecter as a medievalist lecturing on Dante's Divine Comedy, and to some extent echoing the work in his murderous methods.
- Jean-Luc Godard's 2004 film Notre musique is structured in three parts, Hell, Purgatory, and Paradise respectively, alluding to the Divine Comedy.
- The film Dante's Inferno (2007) is based on Sandow Birk's contemporary drawings of the Divine Comedy. The film accurately retells the original story, but with the addition of more recent residents of Hell such as Adolf Hitler and Boss Tweed.
- The 2015 Chinese documentary Behemoth (Chinese: 悲兮魔兽; pinyin: bēixī móshòu), directed by Zhao Liang, is loosely based on Dante Alighieri's Divine Comedy and is about the environmental, sociological, and public health effects of coal-mining in China's Inner Mongolia Autonomous Region.
- The 2016 mystery thriller Inferno makes references to The Divine Comedy and to the Divine Comedy Illustrated by Botticelli including hiding a word puzzle in a version of the painting Map of Hell with the levels of Hell rearranged. There's a clue in an email that refers to a passage from Paradiso and the virus that serves as the catalyst for the film's plot is named "Inferno."
- The 2018 film The House That Jack Built features Matt Dillon as protagonist Jack, a serial killer who believes that his murders are a piece of art, similar to the Divine Comedy. Jack encounters Virgil, or Virg, as he calls him, as a hallucination portrayed by Bruno Ganz, (well known from his role as Adolf Hitler in 2004's Downfall). Jack carries on a commentary with Virgil throughout the film sometimes expressing his desire of becoming an architect despite being an engineer. Jack ends up wearing Dante Alighieri's red robe while unsuccessfully attempting to escape Inferno after rejecting Virg's advice to follow him into Purgatorio, the only safe way of reaching the destination of Paradiso.
- The 2020 film Friend of the World references The Divine Comedy and begins with a direct quote by Dante Alighieri.

== Graphic media ==
=== Animations, comics and graphic novels ===
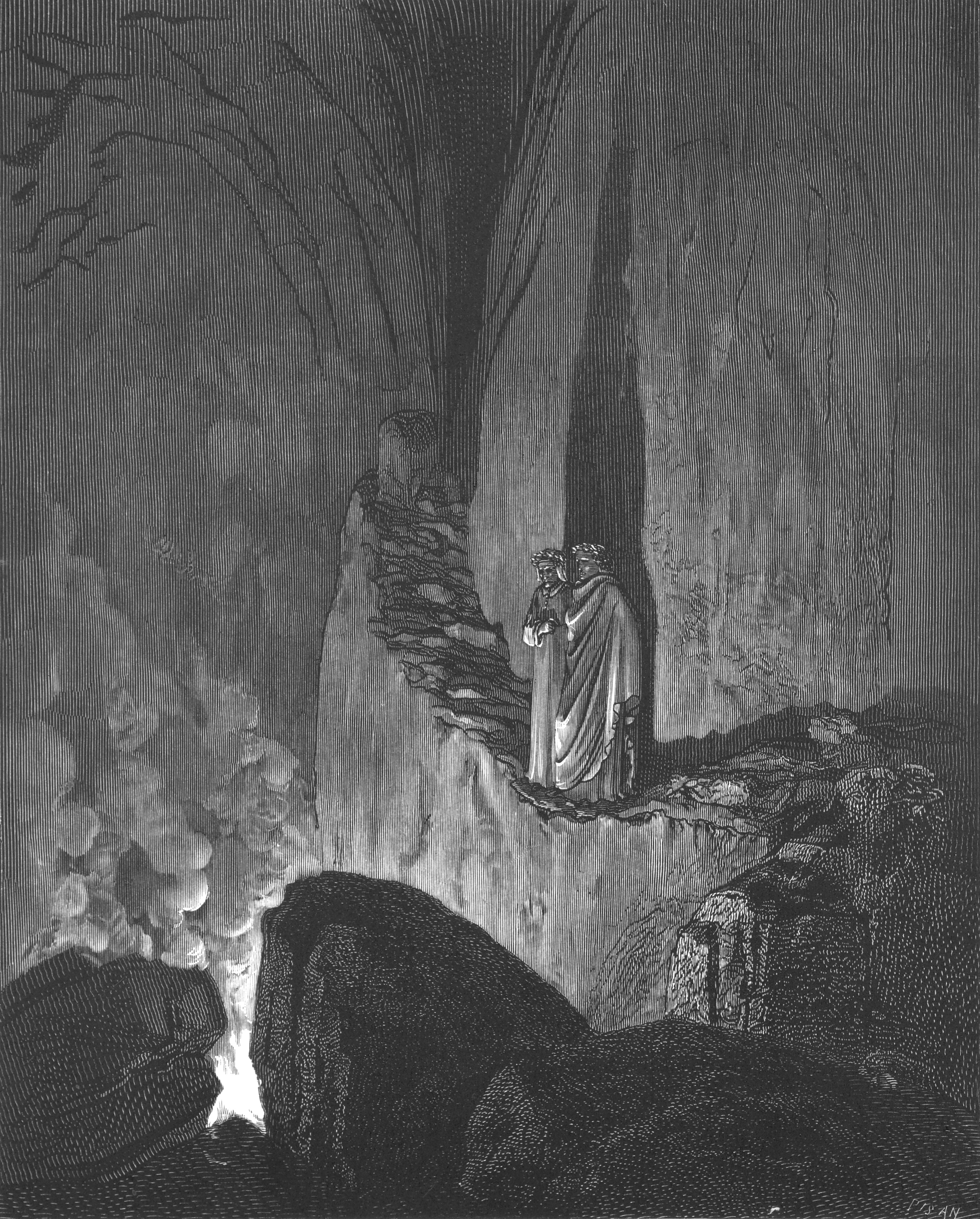
Dave Sim's Cerebus in Hell satirically utilizes Gustave Doré's engravings for the Divine Comedy, such as this one of Dante and Virgil in the Inferno, as backgrounds.

- Manga series Demon Lord Dante from Go Nagai (1972, rebooted in 2002) was inspired by the Gustave Doré illustrations of The Divine Comedy.
- Ty Templeton parodied Dante in his comic book Stig's Inferno (1985-1986).
- Gary Panter's Jimbo: Adventures in 'Paradise (1988), Jimbo in Purgatory (2004), and Jimbo's Inferno (2006) are three graphic novels telling a mis-recounted adaptation of Dante Alighieri's Divine Comedy melded with Boccaccio's Decameron and a bit of Canterbury Tales, John Milton, John Dryden, and pop culture references).
- Neil Gaiman's The Sandman comic series, running from January 1989 to March 1996, features a heavily Dante-inspired Hell, including the Wood of Suicides, the Malebolge, and the City of Dis; Lucifer is imprisoned in Hell. Mike Carey's spin-off series Lucifer, also from DC/Vertigo Comics, was based on characters from The Sandman. It features aspects of a Dante-inspired Hell and Heaven, particularly the Primum Mobile and the Nine Sections.
- In the 1996 Spanish comic El infierno, part of the Superlópez series, the titular character travels to Hell to prevent a demonic contract from being fulfilled. The search reveals a structure identical to the one in the Divine Comedy. Dante is also namedropped many times in the album.
- Dante's Inferno: The Graphic Novel (2012) by Joseph Lanzara utilizes Gustave Doré's 1857 illustrations of the Divine Comedy in the form of a comic book inspired by the poem.
- The Cartoon Network's debut miniseries, Over the Garden Wall (November 2014), corresponds to the structure of the Inferno; it stars a lost poet guided by a woman named Beatrice.
- Dave Sim's sequel series to his comic Cerebus, Cerebus in Hell? (2017) satirically utilizes Gustave Doré's engravings for the Divine Comedy as backgrounds and plot devices.
- Paul and Gaëtan Brizzi made Dante's Inferno: A Graphic Novel Adaptation, which was published in 2023.

=== Video games ===
- Tamashii no Mon Dante no Shinkyoku yori (魂の門 ダンテ「神曲」より or The Gate of Souls ~ From Dante's Divine Comedy), a 1991 side-scrolling action-adventure game inspired by Dante's Divine Comedy released on PC-98 and FM Towns.
- In 2010, Visceral Games and Electronic Arts released a hack-and-slash game based on Dante's Divine Comedy entitled Dante's Inferno. The developers made several liberties with the story, reimagining Dante into a Knights Templar during the Third Crusade, venturing into the nine circles of Hell to retrieve his wife, Beatrice.
  - Dante's Inferno is a series of six comic books based on the same video game. Published by WildStorm from December 2009 through May 2010, the series was written by Christos Gage with art by Diego Latorre.
  - Dante's Inferno: An Animated Epic is a direct-to-DVD animated film released on February 9, 2010 that is also based around the game.
- Limbus Company is a 2023 gacha game developed by South Korean studio Project Moon. The protagonist, a manager referred to as "Dante", has a guide named "Vergilius". The game is divided into sections named after parts of The Divine Comedy, with its chapters being referred to as "Cantos".
- Skate Story is a 2025 skateboarding video game developed by the American indie developer Sam Eng and published by Devolver Digital. Its surrealist narrative is inspired by Inferno, centering on a skateboarder descending through nine layers of a Hell reminiscent of New York City.

=== Tabletop role-playing games ===
Several aspects of the Divine Comedy could have influenced many tabletop role-playing games: visiting ordered parallel worlds on a planar crawl, a gamified progression by trials and levels towards salvation, or using deciphered symbolism to acquire knowledge that gives more power to characters.

- The tabletop role-playing game Dungeons & Dragons named some levels of the Nine Hells after locations in Dante's Inferno. The game borrowed the name "malebranche" for one diabolical race, although the original write-up mistranslated that word as "evil horn".
  - The Planescape setting, in particular, borrows many elements from the book (some wholesale, some piecemeal), and much of the expanded cosmology, with dimensions for the dead based on alignment and most dimensions having many separate layers, are inspired by those seen in the Inferno. The planecrawling gameplay of Planescape and early setting of D&D could be heavily inspired by the structured travel of Dante through the layers of the planes of the Divine Comedy.
- Acheron Games published Inferno, a tabletop role-playing game heavily inspired by the depiction of hell as found in the Divine Comedy.
