= Faust, Part Two =

Second part of the tragic play Faust by Johann Wolfgang von Goethe

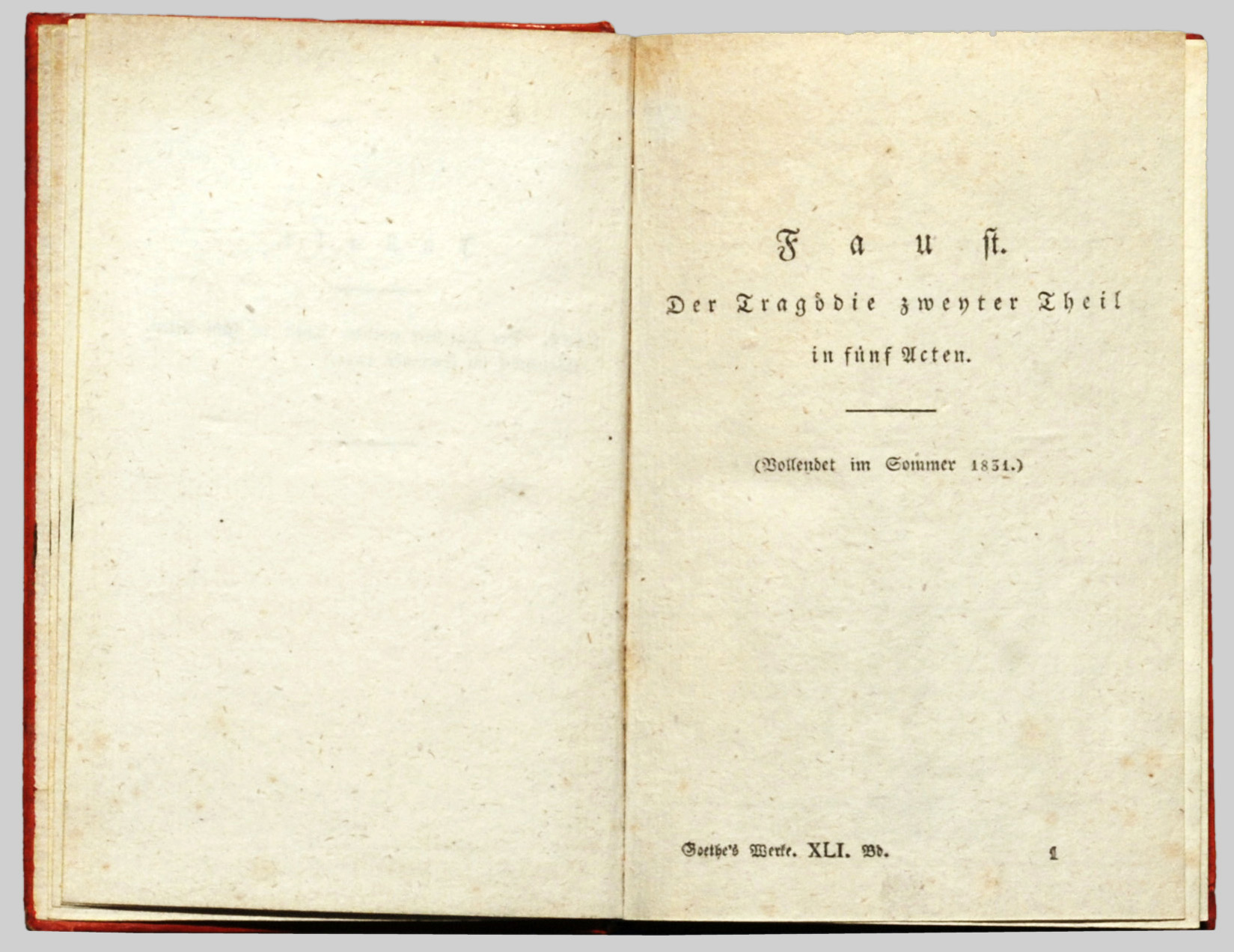
- First edition
- Author: Johann Wolfgang von Goethe
- Language: German
- Series: Goethe's Faust
- Publication date: 1832
- Publication place: German Confederation
- Preceded by: Faust, Part One

Faust: The Second Part of the Tragedy (German: Faust. Der Tragödie zweiter Teil in fünf Akten.) is the second part of the tragic play Faust by Johann Wolfgang von Goethe. It was published in 1832, the year of Goethe's death.

Only part of Faust I is directly related to the legend of Johann Faust, which dates to at latest the beginning of the 16th century (thus preceding Marlowe's play). The "Gretchen" subplot, although now the most widely known episode of the Faust legend, was of Goethe's own invention. In Faust II, the legend (at least in a version of the 18th century, which came to Goethe's attention) already contained Faust's marriage with Helen and an encounter with an Emperor. But certainly Goethe deals with the legendary material very freely in both parts.

== Background ==
Goethe had been working on Faust from before 1772 all the way up to his death in 1832 (he had worked on this play for more than 60 years), alternating between parts. In 1797, following Schiller's advice, he continued his work on the first part of the play, which he completed in 1805 (the same year of Schiller's death). The first part was published three years later, in 1808. In 1818, Goethe read Christopher Marlowe's play, Doctor Faustus, and he began working on the second part of the play in 1825. The first act of the tragedy's second part was written between 1826 and 1827, whilst the second act was written in a period spacing from 1828 to 1830. Goethe wrote the third act for the better half of 1827, and he continued working on the fifth act in 1828. The fourth act was written between February and July 1831, with Goethe sealing the manuscript (which was to be published after his death), but he sometimes took it out for private readings to his daughter-in-law, Ottilie von Goethe, and to his friend, Johann Peter Eckermann. Goethe died in March of 1832, and the tragedy was published a year later by Eckermann and Friedrich Wilhelm Riemer in the first volume of Nachgelassene Werke (Posthumous works).

== Acts ==
=== Act I ===
- Graceful area. Faust, bedded on flowery turf, weary, restless, seeking sleep. Dusk. Ghost circle, floating moves, graceful little figures.

The first act opens with an appeal by Ariel to forgive Faust and ease the cares of his suffering.

- Hall of the Throne. State Council in anticipation of the emperor. Trumpets. Servants of all kinds, beautifully dressed, step forward. The emperor ascends the throne, to his right the astrologer.

The first act sees Mephistopheles (playing the role of a fool) saving the imperial finances of the Emperor – and so the Holy Roman Empire – by money creation, introducing the use of paper money instead of gold to encourage spending (and economic recovery).

- Spacious room with side chambers, decorated and dressed up for the masquerade.

This is by far the most extensive section of the first act, describing the Florentine carnival from the perspective of Goethe, above all based on Antonio Francesco Grazzini's Tutti i trionfi (1559) – a collection of contemporary "songs and hard lifts". A parade of Florentine notables, including Dante and Gianni Schicchi, pass by.

- Lustgarten, morning sun. Faust, Mephistopheles, decent, not remarkable, according to custom, dressed, and both knees exposed.

The "Emperor of Thumb" (to use a devilish term of Mephistopheles) describes how much he enjoyed the recent celebrations, and wants more "dergleichen Scherze" (5988). The Emperor appears and blesses the newly introduced paper money from Mephisto, which is adorned with pictures of Simon Magus. The Emperor begins to understand its meaning and to squander it, as do his advisors. Goethe here satirizes the introduction of paper money during the French Revolution, with various advisors possibly representing Danton, Sieyès and other figures.

- Dark gallery. Faust. Mephistopheles.

Faust enters the "realm of the mothers" – variously described as the depths of the psyche or the womb – in order to bring back the "ideal form" of beauty for the Emperor's delight. In this case, the ideal forms are Helen of Troy and her lover Paris. Faust summons their spirits from Hades, but the emperor and the male members of his court criticize Paris's appearance, while the women of the court criticize Helen's appearance. Faust falls in love with Helen. In a fit of jealousy toward Paris, who is now abducting Helen, Faust destroys the illusion and the act ends in darkness and tumult.

=== Act II ===
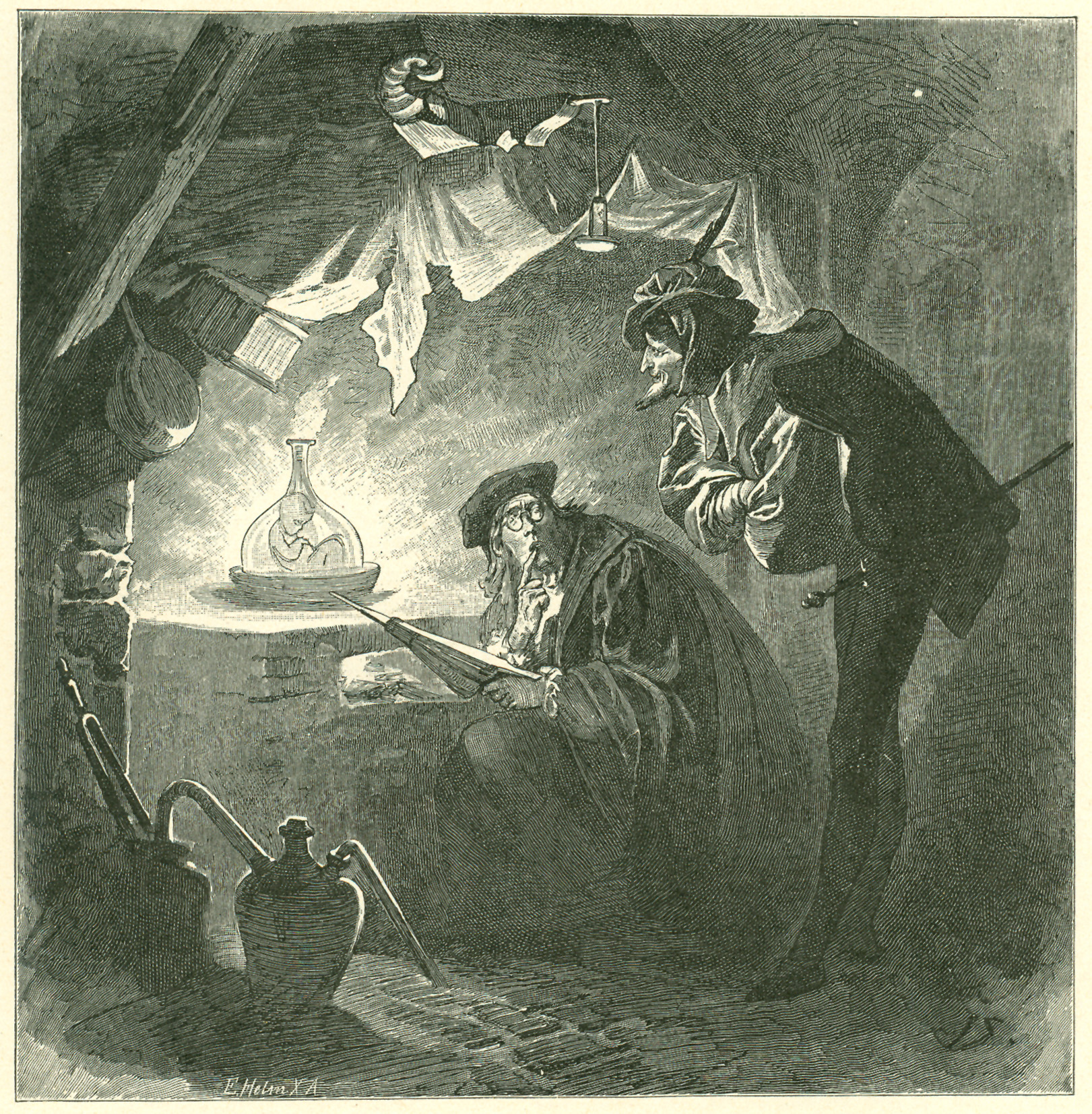
Homunculus in the phial. Famulus Wagner and Mephistopheles (1899), engraving by Franz Xaver Simm

Mephistopheles transports the unconscious Faust into his old study. Mephistopheles, donning Faust's robe once again, resumes his conversation with the freshman, who is now a cynical baccalaureus. The Homunculus, an artificial human being created by Wagner, Faust's former famulus, by means of an alchemical process, leads Faust and Mephistopheles to the "Classical Walpurgisnacht", where they encounter gods and monsters from Greek antiquity. Faust, still searching for Helen, is led by the sybil Manto into the Underworld. Mephistopheles, meanwhile, meets the Phorkyads or Phorcydes (another name for the Graeae), three hideous hags who share one tooth and one eye between them, and he disguises himself as one of them. Guided by the sea-god Proteus, the Homunculus fuses with the sea so to go through all stages to evolve into human.

=== Act III ===
The third act begins with Helen's arrival at the palace of Menelaus in Sparta, accompanied by women, who, as in Classical drama, constitute the chorus. The hideous Phorkyas appears at the hearth, and warns Helen that Menelaus means to sacrifice her and her attendants. Distraught at this new knowledge, Helen implores Phorkyas to save them. Phorkyas transports Helen and the chorus to Faust's fortress, where Helen and Faust declare their love for each other. After defeating Menelaus' army, Faust proclaims the pastoral beauty of the Arcadian countryside.

The scene changes in time and space: a range of rocky caverns, with a shadowy grove extending to the foot of the rocks. Phorkyas, now Faust and Helen's attendant, explains to the newly-woken chorus that during the past interval Faust and Helen have had a spirited son named Euphorion, who charms all with his beauty and gift for music. The wild Euphorion, becoming increasingly bold in his flight, falls to his death (in allusion to Icarus), whereupon the sorrowful Helen disappears in a mist to Hades (in allusion to the legend of Orpheus). The chorus of women, undesirous of joining their mistress in the Underworld, revert to nature, which they extol in songs of praise. As the act ends, Phorkyas is revealed to be Mephistopheles in disguise.

=== Act IV ===
In the fourth act, Faust finds himself taken away from Arcadia to a mountain top in Germany. Watching a cloud that is dividing into two, he recognizes in one part Helen and in the other Gretchen. The cloud with the form of Helen moves eastward, while Gretchen's cloud rises heavenward. Then Mephistopheles, who has cast off his Greek appearance, joins Faust again. Mephistopheles strikes up a geognostic dispute about the genesis of the Earth's surface and especially the mountain region of this scene. Afterwards, Faust states, as his new higher purpose, that he wants to reclaim new land. His underlying idea is to control the elements or even to subdue nature. Subsequently, Faust focuses on controlling the sea, from which he reclaims new land by means of dikes and drainage ditches. But a war breaks out between the Emperor and a rival emperor, interrupting Faust's plans. Mephistopheles introduces the three mighty men (German: Die drey Gewaltigen) Bullyboy, Grab-quick and Hold-tight ("Raufebold", "Habebald", "Haltefest") who are to help suppress the revolt and implement Faust's ambitious project. With their assistance Faust achieves victory for the Emperor. The three mighty men reveal dubious behaviours as looters which cast a long shadow over their future services. As a reward for his military service, Faust is given a fiefdom on the seashore.

=== Act V ===
An indefinite time has passed since the end of the previous act, and Faust is now an old but powerful man favored by the king. Using dikes and dams to push back the sea, Faust has built a castle on the reclaimed land. Upon seeing the hut of an old peasant couple, Baucis and Philemon, with a nearby chapel, Faust becomes irritated that these two structures do not belong to him, and orders them removed. Mephistopheles, overinterpreting Faust's orders, murders the old couple. The personification of Care breathes upon Faust's eyes, making him blind. Upon disclosing his plans to better the lives of his subjects, motivated perhaps out of guilt, he recognizes the moment of sheer bliss which he would seek to prolong, and drops dead. Mephistopheles, finding that Faust has lost his wager, tries to claim his soul. Although Mephistopheles has won his bet with Faust, he has lost the wager he made with God in the Prologue to Part I that Faust could be deterred from righteous pursuits. Angels suddenly appear, dropping rose-petals on the demons, who flee. Mephistopheles stands his ground, however, and, under the aphrodisiac influence of the roses, lusts after the angels, who whisk away Faust's soul while he is thus distracted.

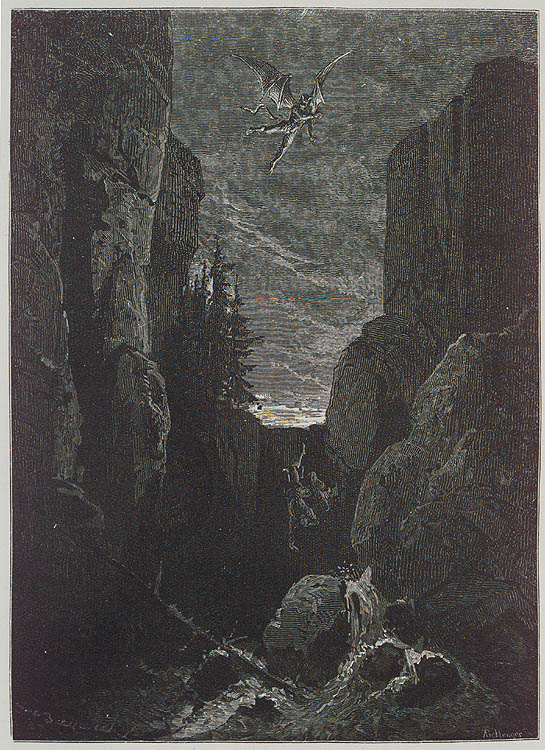
Death of Faust (1870) by Émile Bayard

The scene abruptly changes to a wilderness inhabited by holy anchorites: "Mountain-gorges, Forest, Rock, Desert". Pater Profundus discloses the parable of nature, which is a harbinger of divine love. The angels bearing Faust's soul appear in heaven. After the enraptured Doctor Marianus extols the Eternal Feminine, the virgin Mary, Mater Gloriosa, appears from on high. Three Christian holy women, Magna Peccatrix (the Great Sinneress, Luke 7:36), Mulier Samaritana (the Samaritan woman, John 4), and Maria Aegyptiaca, plead for Faust's soul, while Una Poenitentium ("a penitent", formerly Gretchen) also pleads for grace and offers to lead the reborn Faust into the higher spheres of heaven. Mater Gloriosa grants her wish.

The Chorus Mysticus ends the drama:

All that is transient
Is parable only:
The unattainable
Here becomes reality:
The indescribable,
Here is done:
Woman, eternal [das Ewig-Weibliche, "the eternal female"],
Beckons us on.

=== Ancient parallels ===
The final words are spoken by a "Chorus Mysticus", i.e. a chorus related to the mysteries, which alludes to an "indescribable" process in which "the eternal feminine leads us on". This resembles ancient mystery religions, and particularly the mysteries of Isis, more than it does orthodox Christian mysticism. In ancient rites of initiation into the mysteries of the goddess Isis, the initiate was guided by a nonverbal process called the "epopteia". The last words of Goethe's Faust Part II call to mind the "epopteia", which is a nonverbal and indescribable process, associated with the sense of sight.

Similarly, a few lines earlier, Faust petitions the angels for a vision of the Queen of heaven:

Mightiest empress of the world,
Let me, in the blue
Pavilion of the sky unfurl'd,
Thy mystery view!

Höchste Herrscherin der Welt!
Lasse mich, im blauen,
Ausgespannten Himmelszelt
Dein Geheimniß schauen. (11997–12000)

Likewise in his final words, Faust prays to the Mater Gloriosa using the titles "Virgin, Mother, Queen" (11995) and also "Goddess" (12100). This goes beyond orthodox Christian teaching, for although "Queen of heaven" is a Christian title of the Virgin Mary, Christian churches balk at calling her "Goddess", which would imply polytheism.

However, in the mysteries of Isis, a goddess was indeed invoked by the title "Queen of heaven" -- as witnessed by Apuleius's The Golden Ass, an important source for the modern understanding of ancient mystery religions. The protagonist of the Golden Ass begins his prayer to the "Goddess" by calling her "Queen of Heaven".

Apuleius also calls Isis "mother of all Nature ... whose sole divinity is worshipped in differing forms, with varying rites, under many names, by all the world." Goethe echoes this motif of the archetypal "mother of Nature", for instance at the beginning of Faust Part I, Doctor Faust refers to Nature as a "veiled goddess", in explicit reference to the ancient veiled Isis, who was also identified as goddess and mother of nature:

Mysterious, even in broad daylight,
Nature won't let her veil be raised:
What your spirit can't bring to sight,
Won't by screws and levers be displayed.

Geheimnißvoll am lichten Tag
Läßt sich Natur des Schleyers nicht berauben,
Und was sie deinem Geist nicht offenbaren mag,
Das zwingst du ihr nicht ab mit Hebeln und mit Schrauben. (672–675)

== Goethe's statements about Faust II ==
In the context of Act III:

I never doubted that the readers for whom I effectively wrote would grasp the principal significance of the portrayal straight away. It is time that the impassioned dispute between classicists and romantics should finally be reconciled. The principal thing is that we should properly cultivate ourselves; the source from which we do so would not matter, if we did not have to fear the possibility of miscultivation by appealing to false models. For it is certainly a broader and purer insight into and around Greek and Roman literature to which we owe our liberation from the monkish barbarism of the period between the fifteenth and sixteenth centuries. Is it not from this high level that we can learn to appreciate everything in its true physical and aesthetic value, both what is oldest and what is newest?

– Goethe's letter to K. J. L. Iken September 27, 1827 (translation of Rüdiger Bubner)

Rather in the context of Act III:

"Yet, ... it all appeals to the senses, and on the stage would satisfy the eye: more I did not intend. Let the crowd of spectators take pleasure in the spectacle; the higher import will not escape the initiated, as has been the case with the 'Magic Flute', and other things beside."

– Conversations with Goethe by Johann Peter Eckermann January 25, 1827 (translated by John Oxenford)

In the context of Act II "The Mothers! Mothers! nay, it sounds so strange." (6216–6217):

"I can reveal to you no more [...] except that I found, in Plutarch, that in ancient Greece mention was made of the Mothers as divinities. This is all that I owe to others, the rest is my own invention. Take the manuscript home with you, study it carefully, and see what you can make of it."

– Conversations with Goethe by Johann Peter Eckermann January 10, 1830 (translated by John Oxenford)

"But, in the second part, there is scarcely anything of the subjective; here is seen a higher, broader, clearer, more passionless world, and he who has not looked about him and had some experience, will not know what to make of it."

– Conversations with Goethe by Johann Peter Eckermann February 17, 1831 (translated by John Oxenford)

== See also ==
- Gustav Mahler's Eighth Symphony sets the text of the last scene of Faust II as its concluding movement.
