= Inferno (Tangerine Dream album) =

Live album with studio elements by Tangerine Dream
- Released: March 2002
- Recorded: October 7, 2001 (live); 2002 (studio overdubs)
- Venue: St. Marien Church, Bernau, Germany
- Genre: Modern classical, electronic, ambient
- Length: 79:02
- Label: TDI Music
- Producer: Edgar Froese

Tangerine Dream chronology
The Past Hundred Moons (2001)	Inferno (2002)	The Melrose Years (2002)

Inferno is the seventy-third release and twelfth live album by German electronic group Tangerine Dream. It is the first live album to feature new compositions since 220 Volt Live (1993). The lyrical content is based on the first part of the Italian narrative poem Divine Comedy by Dante Alighieri. Inferno is the first album to feature percussionist Iris Camaa who remained with the group until 2014.

== Reception ==
Prog Archives described the work as "something of quite astonishing beauty". The Times Literary Supplement called the work a "musical extravaganza".

Tangerine Dream used the album as a modern soundtrack for the 1911 Italian silent film L'Inferno. Nick Hasted in The Independent wrote that while the film was a "fascinating relic", with their soundtrack "Tangerine Dream add momentum and even melodrama, restricting themselves at times to dark, low strings." Ed Potton included the album in The Times 2021 list of "The 20 best film soundtracks".

== Album trilogy ==
Inferno is the first album of a trilogy consisting of the following albums all inspired by Dante's Divine Comedy:

- Inferno (2002)
- Purgatorio (2004)
- Paradiso (2006)

== Track listing ==
All compositions are by Edgar Froese, except where indicated.

1. "Before the Closing of the Day" - 4:50
2. "The Spirit of Virgil" - 2:39
3. "Minotaurae Hunt at Dawn" - 3:24
4. "Those Once Broke the First Word" - 3:38
5. "Dante in Despair" - 3:25
6. "Io Non Mor" - 5:49
7. "Vidi Tre Facce" - 4:41
8. "At the Deepest Point in Space" - 2:38
9. "L'omperador Del Doloroso Regno" - 4:45
10. "Voices in the Starless Night" - 4:14
11. "Fear and Longing" - 3:06
12. "Fallen for Death" - 4:38
13. "Where All Light Went Silent" - 3:39
14. "Charon, Il Barchere" - 3:59
15. "La Grey De Los Almas Perdidas" - 7:28
16. "Justice of the Karma Law" - 3:02 (Jerome Froese)
17. "As the Sun Moves Towards Heaven" - 7:57 (Edgar Froese, Jerome Froese)
18. "Beatrice, L'Âme Infinie" - 5:10

== Personnel ==
Tangerine Dream

- Edgar Froese – keyboards, sequencer
- Jerome Froese – keyboards, sequencer
- Iris Camaa (credited as "Iris Kulterer") – timpani, percussion, alto vocals

Guest vocalists

- Bianca Acquaye – alto vocals
- Jayney Klimek – alto vocals
- Claire Foquet – mezzo vocals
- Barbara Kindermann – soprano vocals
- Bry Gonzales – soprano vocals
- Jane Monet – soprano vocals
