= Purgatorio (album) =

Studio album by Tangerine Dream
- Released: October 26, 2004
- Recorded: 2003–2004
- Genres: Electronica, ambient
- Length: 131:47

Tangerine Dream chronology
| Rockface (2003) | Purgatorio (2004) | Aachen - January 21st 1981 (2004) |

Professional ratings
Review scores
| Source | Rating |
|---|---|
| AllMusic | 3/5 stars |

Purgatorio is a studio album and the seventy-eighth release overall by German electronic band Tangerine Dream. It was released in October 2004. A prerelease version was only available via internet at the Tangerine Dream's website in March 2004. The album includes a studio version of a live performance at the Royal Festival Hall, in London, on March 6, 2004. The show was the opening night of the Ether Electronic Music Festival followed by the world premiere of a restored version of the Italian silent movie “L'Inferno” from 1911 by Giuseppe de Liguoro's, based on the first part of Dante Alighieri’s “Divine Comedy”

== Album trilogy ==
Purgatorio is the second album of a trilogy consisting of the following albums all inspired by Dante's work:

- Inferno (2002)
- Purgatorio (2004)
- Paradiso (2006)

== Track listing ==
=== Disc one ===
1. "Above The Great Dry Land" – 6:19
2. "Chasing The Bad Seed" – 8:48
3. "Slave To The Gods" – 6:31
4. "Hope And Glory" – 6:44
5. "Sun Son's Seal (Part One)" – 8:21
6. "Beyond All Suns" – 6:34
7. "Sisiphus" – 4:37
8. "All The Steps To Heaven" – 13:12
9. "Mountain Of Destiny" – 10:51

=== Disc two ===
1. "The Glowing Zodiac Wheel" – 6:08
2. "Modern Cave Men" – 5:02
3. "Death Of Medusa" – 7:23
4. "Blinded By The World's Desire" – 6:22
5. "Sun Son's Seal (Part Two)" – 8:27
6. "Soulgate" – 7:59
7. "Till The End Of Silence" – 5:17
8. "Prison And Paradise" – 5:39
9. "Spirit Spiral" – 7:33
