= Dante and Virgil =

1850 painting by William-Adolphe Bouguereau

Dante and Virgil in Hell
- Dante et Virgille en Enfer (French)
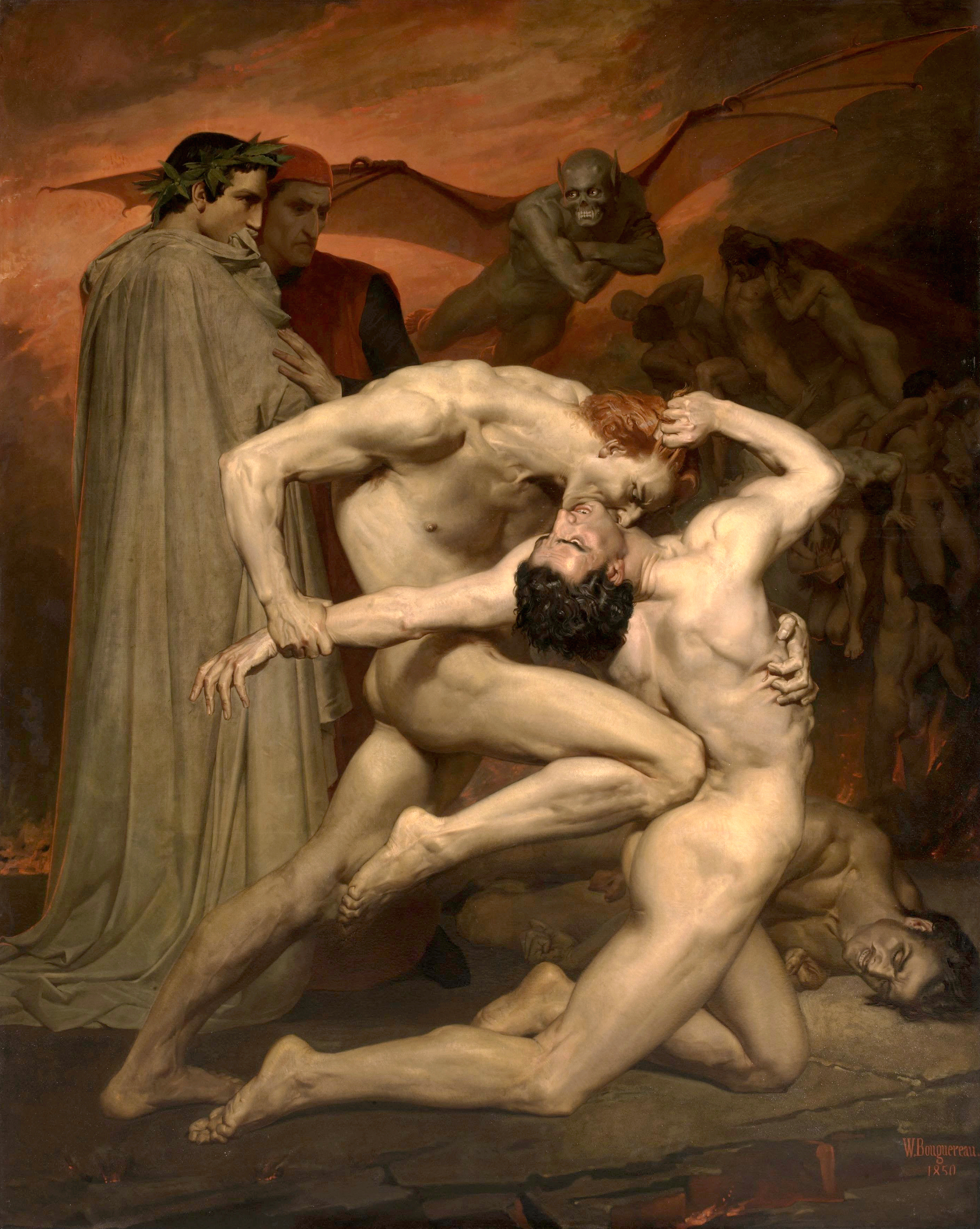
- Artist: William-Adolphe Bouguereau
- Year: 1850
- Medium: Oil on canvas
- Subject: The Divine Comedy
- Dimensions: 281 cm × 225 cm (111 in × 89 in)
- Location: Musée d'Orsay, Paris

Dante and Virgil, also known as Dante and Virgil in Hell, is an oil-on-canvas painting by the French academic painter William-Adolphe Bouguereau, from 1850. It is in the Musée d'Orsay in Paris.

The painting depicts a scene from Dante's Divine Comedy, which narrates a journey through Hell by Dante and his guide Virgil. In the scene the author and his guide are looking on as two damned souls are entwined in eternal combat. One of the souls is an alchemist and heretic named Capocchio. He is being bitten on the neck by the trickster Gianni Schicchi, who had used fraud to claim another man's inheritance.

It was Bougereau's third and ultimately unsuccessful attempt to win the coveted Prix de Rome, even though he had submitted a work that he knew would appeal to the judges. He did however find partial success in his efforts later in the year when Shepherds Find Zenobia on the Banks of the Araxes won the consolation second prize of the year. It was displayed at the Salon of 1850 held at the Palais-Royal in Paris.
