= Graba' =

Belgian artist (1940 - 2016)

- Ignace De Graeve
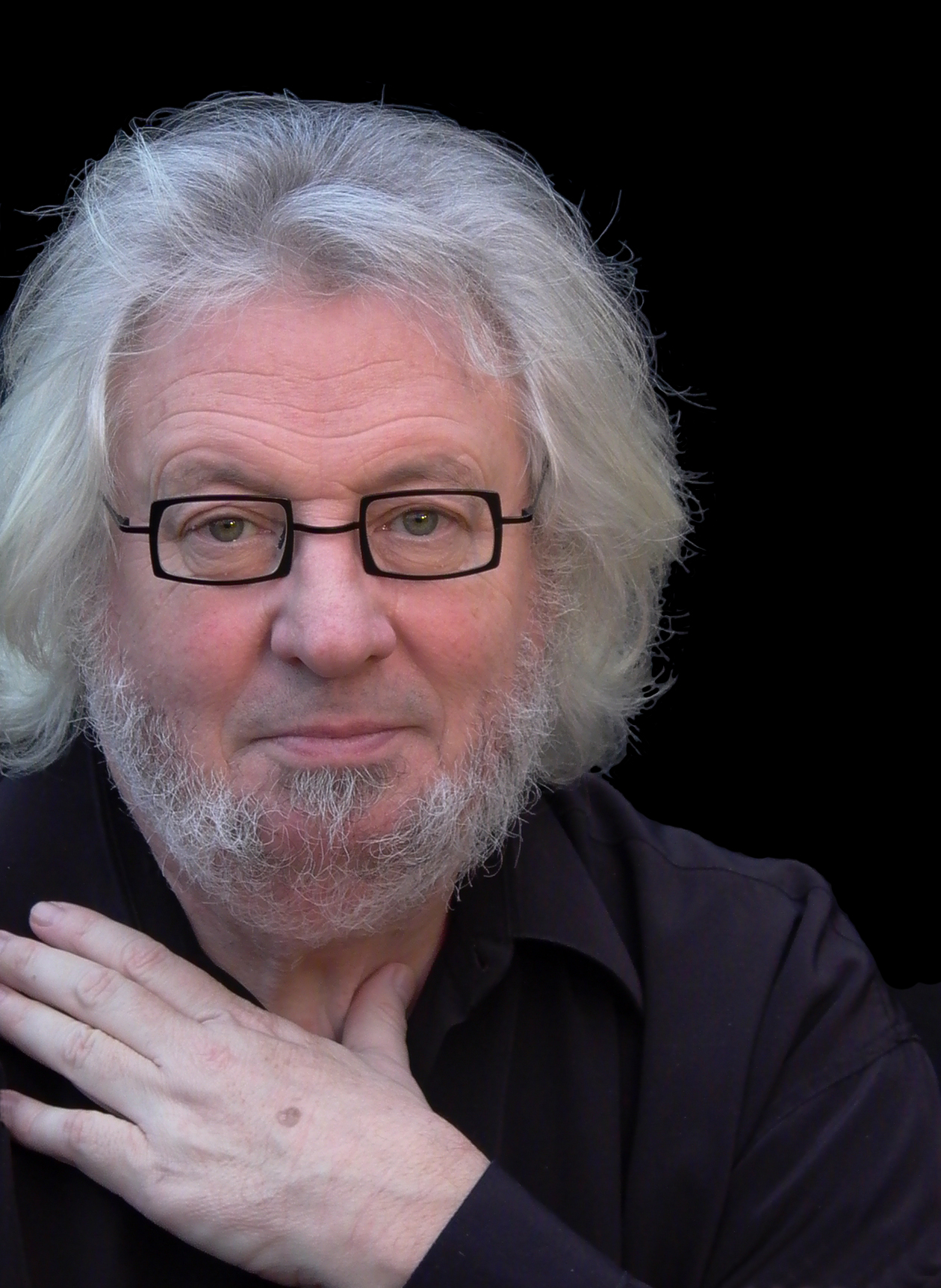
- Born: 24 September 1940; Ghent
- Died: 17 January 2016 (aged 75); Bruges
- Known for: paintings jewels
- Style: "new old master"
- Website: http://www.graba.be

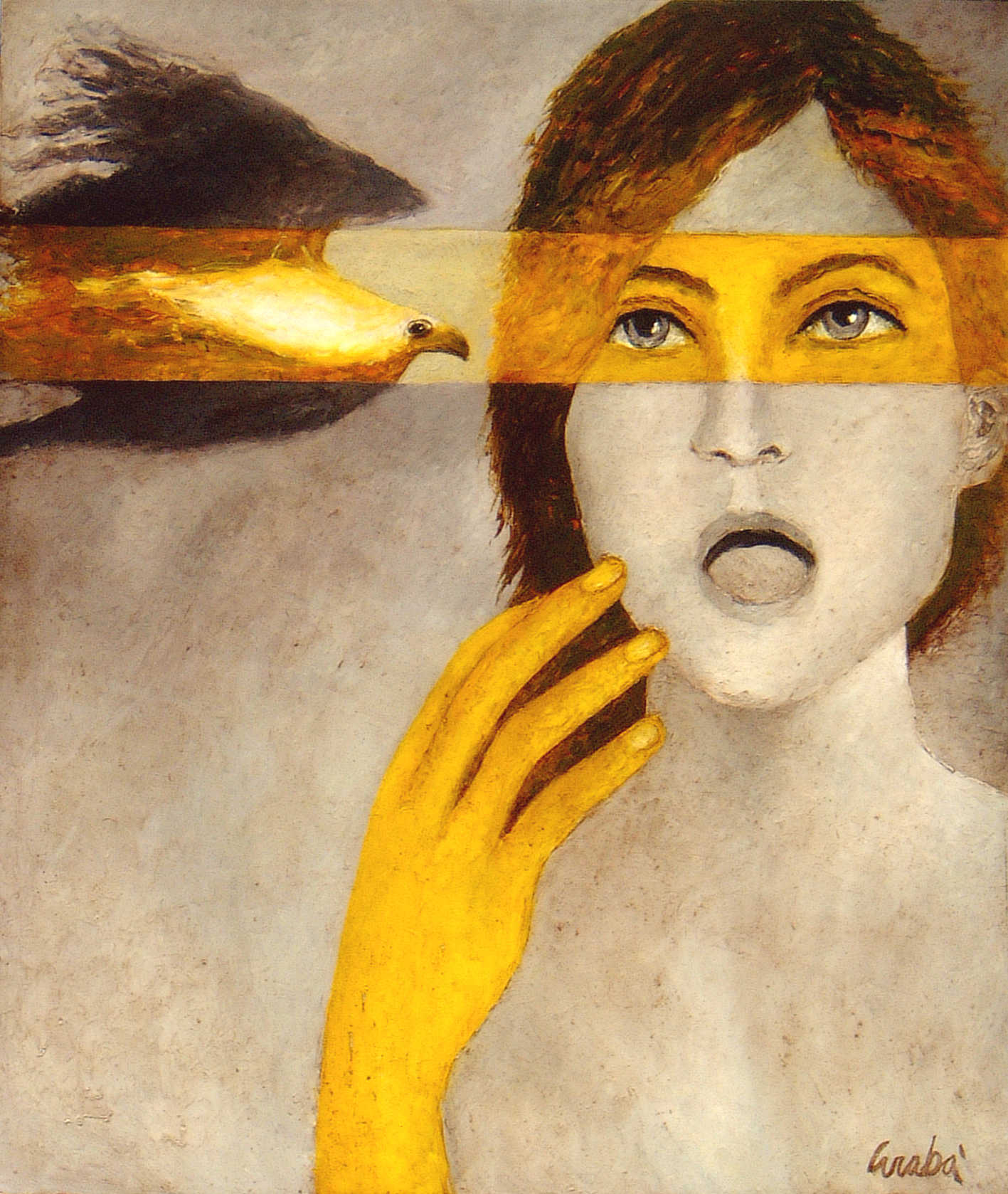
Painting from La Divina Commedia, Inferno canto 17

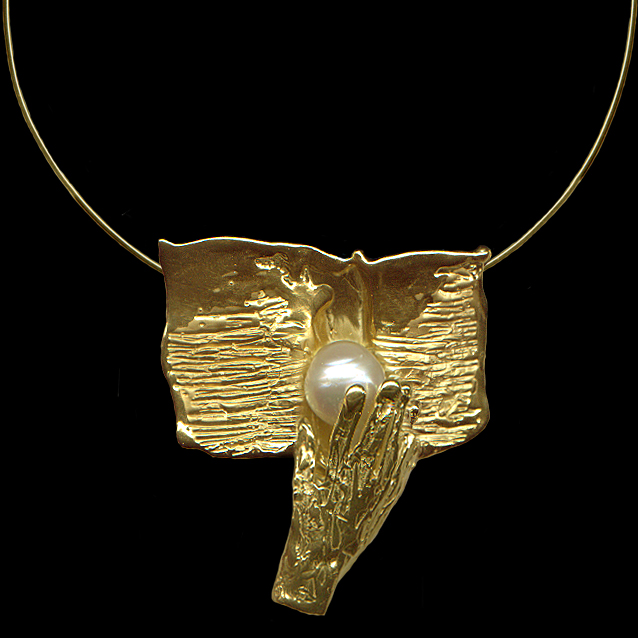
Jewel from Paradise Lost

Ignace De Graeve (Ghent, 24 September 1940 – Bruges, 17 January 2016) was a Belgian artist, who also used the name Graba'. He created mainly paintings and jewellery.

== Biography ==
Graba' studied history, followed by decorative arts in Ghent and finally audiovisual media in Paris.

For eight years, he was a critic for the Belgian Radio and Television, hosting radio programs of classical music, and gave lectures on 'how to listen to music' in several cities. He led an international design agency for five years and provided numerous institutions, societies and companies with a new brand image.

As artistic director of "language of forms" he was responsible for the creation and realisation of the Belgian pavilion for the 1985 World's fair at Tsukuba, Ibaraki, the Flanders Hotel in Gent, the Flemish-Japanese golf club in Hasselt, and the Markies Building in Brussels and buildings in Hong Kong and Singapore. He lived in Paris since 1979 and worked in France, Belgium and Portugal.

== Works ==
Graba' created his paintings and jewels in cycles. He found inspiration in eastern as well as western themes. Graba' wanted to shock by painting in a deliberative figurative manner as a so-called "new" old master. He painted on large wooden panels, applying many layers of paint and ink, based on the glacis technique, giving the work a unique luminosity and transparency. His jewels were crafted through the lost wax technique. After centrifugal casting in 750/1000 alloy, the mould was broken and destroyed meaning only one original existed.

== Cycles/exhibitions ==
- 1976 – "Garden of Delights" (inspiration: The Garden of Earthly Delights of Hieronymus Bosch); Museum of Modern Art – Sint-Martens-Latem
- 1976 – "The Mystery of Light" (inspiration: the 12 hours of the day), Museum of Modern Art – Sint-Martens-Latem
- 1977 – "The Mystic of Islam" (inspiration: the religion of Islam), the Castel of Zeist, the Egmont Palace in Brussels, Etienne de Causans Gallery in Paris, the Art Museum of Tehran (Iran). 1978 – "Tantra" (inspiration: the ritual of Tantra), the Reserve Knokke
- 1978 – "The Painter and his model" (portraits), the Reserve Knokke
- 1979 – "Apocalypse" (inspiration: the book of Revelation), the City Theatre of Courtrai, Nardowe National Museum of Warschau, Museum Beaux-Arts of Strasbourg, Palau Virreina Barcelona
- 1980 – "The Conference of Birds" (inspiration: the poem "The Conference of the Birds" by the Persian Attar of Nishapur) (Jewels), Pascal Morabito Champs Elysées Paris, Mähler-Besse Antwerp, Casino of Knokke, International Gold Corporation – the Louvre des Antiquaires Paris
- 1981 – "Tree of Life" (inspiration: the Tree of life from the Book of Genesis) Casino of Knokke, Renheide Collection Leende
- 1981 – "Visions of the Night" Sfinks Gallery Antwerp, Harmagedon Gallery Courtrai
- 1982 – "The New Genji" (inspiration: The Tale of Genji) Casino of Chaudfontaine, Gertrude Van Dyck Gallery Brussels, Hillman Collection
- 1983 – "Thousand Eyes of Water" – A.W.W. Antwerp
- 1984 – "The Language of forms" (Jewels) and "Birth" (Drawings) – Harmagedon Gallery Courtrai
- 1985 – "The Five Seasons" – Harmagedon Gallery Courtrai
- 1987 – "Genesis I" (inspiration: the Book of Genesis), Ladeuze Gallery Maarkedal, Harmagedon Gallery Courtrai
- 1988 – "Men in the Mirror" (inspiration: painting of Rembrandt) – the artist's private collection.
- 1989 – "Genesis II" – studio of the artist Paris
- 1991 – "Emotions in Motion I" : Harmagedon Gallery Courtrai, Morton & Graham Art Gallery in Santa Monica
- 1993 – "Emotions in Motion II" – Tresors & Tresors d'Art fine Art Fair for Asia-world Trade Centre Singapore.
- 1994 – "Cathedrals" Casa cor Gallery Cascais (Lisbon), Buschlen Mowatt Gallery Vancouver
- 1996 – "The Flowers of Evil" (inspiration: poem "Les Fleurs du mal" by Charles Baudelaire), Harmagedon Gallery Courtrai, Première Gallery Paris, Richard May Gallery Chicago, Buschlen Mowatt Gallery Vancouver
- 1998 – "The Black Paintings" (inspiration: the Black Paintings by Francisco Goya), artist's studio in Paris
- 1999 – "Landscapes", exhibition in the artist's studio in Paris
- 2003 – "La Divina Commedia" (inspiration: the epic Divine Comedy by Dante Alighieri), Art Hall kunsthal Sint-Pietersabdij Ghent
- 2004 – "Ulysses" (inspiration: the novel Ulysses by James Joyce), works in progress
- 2007 – "Paradise Lost" (inspiration: "Paradise Lost:, poem by John Milton), Jewels, Harmagedon Gallery Courtrai
- 2008 – "Graba' in residence", Belgian Embassy Copenhagen
- 2009 – "a Man of answers… ?" (inspiration: daily life questions and talks with the historical Iēshoua' of Nazareth), the Saint-Bavo Cathedral Ghent

== Publications ==
=== Monographies ===
- 1976 Garden of Delight, Safi (CH)
- 1976 The Mysteries of Light, Safi (CH)
- 1977 The Mystic of Islam, Safi (CH)
- 1978 Tantra, Safi (CH)
- 1978 The Painter and his Model, Safi (CH)
- 1980 The Conference of Birds, Editions du Temple, Paris *1982 The New Genji, LOF, Amsterdam
- 1984 The Language of forms, Decorte Publishing, Ghent
- 2003 La Divina Commedia, LOF Brussels

=== DVDs ===
- 2003 La Divina Commedia, LOF Brussels
- 2007 Paradise Lost, LOF Brussels
