= Gianni Schicchi de' Cavalcanti =

Medieval Florentine knight

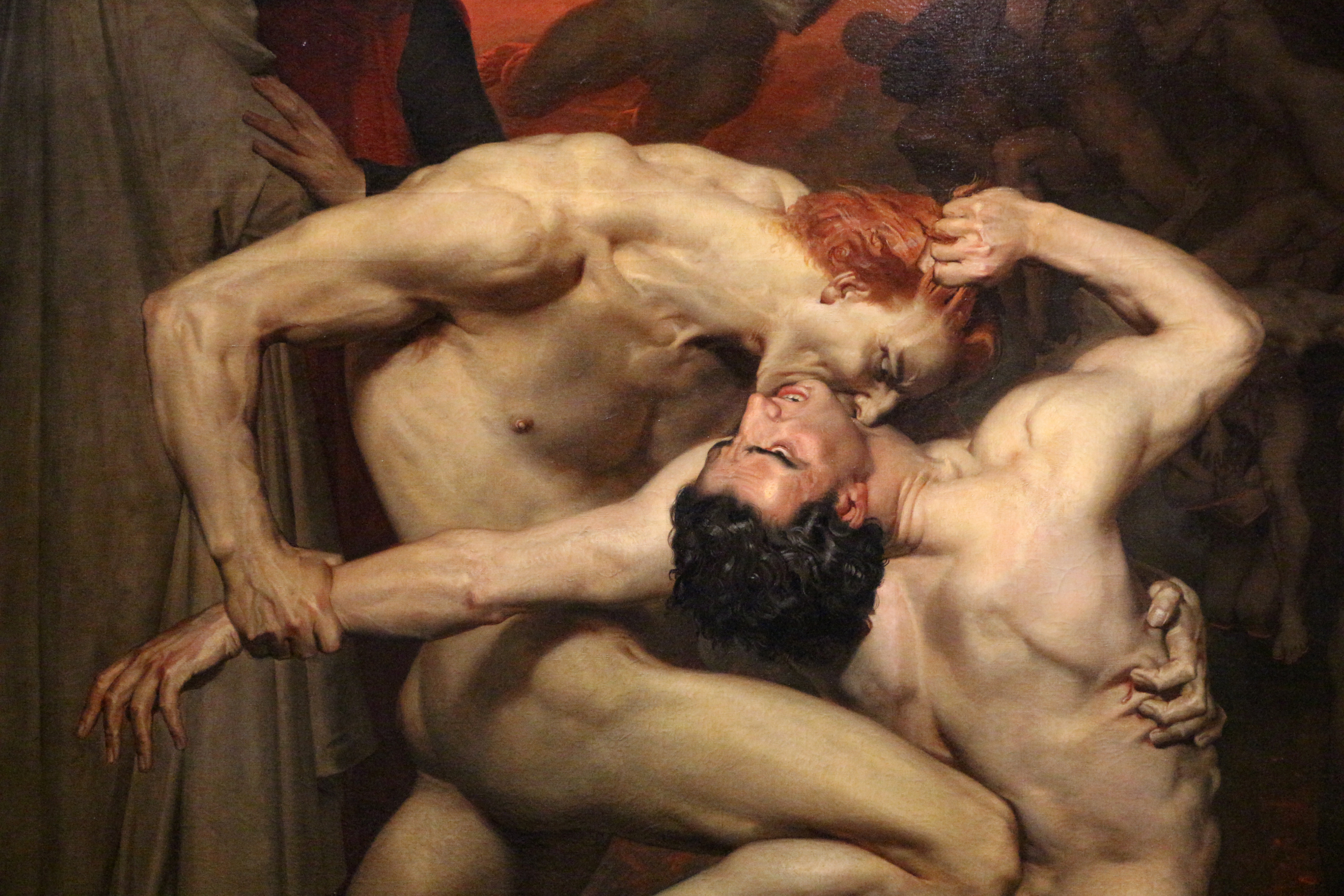
Detail of Dante and Virgil by William-Adolphe Bouguereau (1850); Schicchi, with red hair, portrayed biting into Capocchio's neck

Schicchi (died c. February 1280) was a medieval knight of Florence in the thirteenth century. His life, including his crime of fraud by being a talented imposter, is detailed by Dante in the Inferno, which inspired a Puccini opera and a later play. Dante's depiction of Schicchi's eternal punishment with insanity in hell inspired a painting by Bouguereau.

== Dante's portrayal ==
There is not much historical information about him, but taking Dante's reference to him as a starting point, commentators have portrayed a biography of him that largely follows the passage of the Inferno – (Canto trentesimo, vv. 32-33 and 42-45). In the forger's edit, he is condemned for "personal falsification", that is for having cheated others by taking the place of Buoso Donati il Vecchio.

== Other views ==
The question widely debated by the glossators, albeit with some differences but substantially the same, is that this Schicchi was famous for the imitations of people and that when the rich widower and childless Buoso died, he, at the request of his friend Simone Donati, Buoso's nephew, sneaked into the bed of the deceased shortly after his death and called a notary and dictated a will in favor of Simone, which was promptly ratified. For himself, it seems that he was entitled only one mare (quoted by Dante) which is an indication of the burlesque and novella character of what happened.

== Works inspired by Schicchi ==
- Gianni Schicchi is depicted fighting Capocchio in William Bougereau's painting Dante and Virgil.
- Starting from this story, and with much lighter and more pleasant stylistic characters, Giacomo Puccini composed the comic opera Gianni Schicchi, performed in 1918. Another famous play is the comedy Gianni Schicchi by Gildo Passini, which made its successful debut in Milan in 1922 at the Olympia theatre, staged by the Compagnia Talli-Melato-Betrone.

== Bibliography ==
- Vittorio Sermonti, Inferno, Rizzoli editions 2001.
- Umberto Bosco and Giovanni Reggio, La Divina Commedia – Inferno, Le Monnier 1988.
- Fabrizio Scheggi, Il Mugello nel libro di Montaperti, Borgo San Lorenzo 2016, ISBN 9788899386078
