= Nowy horyzont =

Studio album by SBB
- Released: 1975
- Genre: Progressive rock, psychedelic rock, jazz-rock, hard rock
- Length: 40:07
- Label: Polskie Nagrania Muza

SBB chronology
SBB (1974)	Nowy horyzont (1975)	Pamięć (1976)

Nowy horyzont (lit. 'New horizon') is the first studio album by SBB, released in 1975 by Polskie Nagrania Muza. It was reissued by Metal Mind Productions in 2004 and 2005 with four additional tracks.

== Track listing ==
=== Side A ===
No.	Title	Lyrics	Music	Length
1.	"Na pierwszy ogień"		Józef Skrzek	3:15
2.	"Błysk"		Skrzek	2:45
3.	"Nowy horyzont"		Skrzek	7:47
4.	"Ballada o pięciu głodnych"	Julian Matej	Skrzek, Anthimos Apostolis, Jerzy Piotrowski	3:55

=== Side B ===
No.	Title	Music	Length
5.	"Wolność z nami"	Skrzek, Apostolis, Piotrowski	20:00

=== Metal Mind Productions reissue bonus tracks ===
No.	Title	Music	Length
6.	"Xeni"	Skrzek, Apostolis, Piotrowski	6:39
7.	"Penia"	Skrzek, Apostolis, Piotrowski	15:59
8.	"Dyskoteka"	Skrzek, Apostolis, Piotrowski	6:55
9.	"Na pierwszy ogień"	Skrzek	6:49

== Personnel ==
- Józef Skrzek – bass guitar, piano, synthesizer, Hammond organ, harmonica, vocals
- Antymos Apostolis – guitar
- Jerzy Piotrowski – drums
