= Memento z banalnym tryptykiem =

Studio album by SBB
- Released: 16 February 1981
- Studio: Polskie Nagrania Muza
- Genre: Progressive rock
- Length: 40:52 (1981), 51:32 (2004/2005)

SBB chronology
Welcome (1979)	Memento z banalnym tryptykiem (1981)	Nastroje (2002)

Memento z banalnym tryptykiem (lit. 'Memento of a banal triptych') is the ninth studio album by the progressive rock band SBB.

It was the band's last album before its disbanding in 1980, and was actually released in 1981, after the band had already split up. They would only reunite much later to record new music again.

== Recording ==
The album was recorded in Polskie Nagrania Muza. During the recording, the band was supported by a second guitarist, Sławomir Piwowar, and Józef Skrzek's brother Jan Skrzek, who plays the harmonica. After finishing recording, the band broke up.

== Content ==
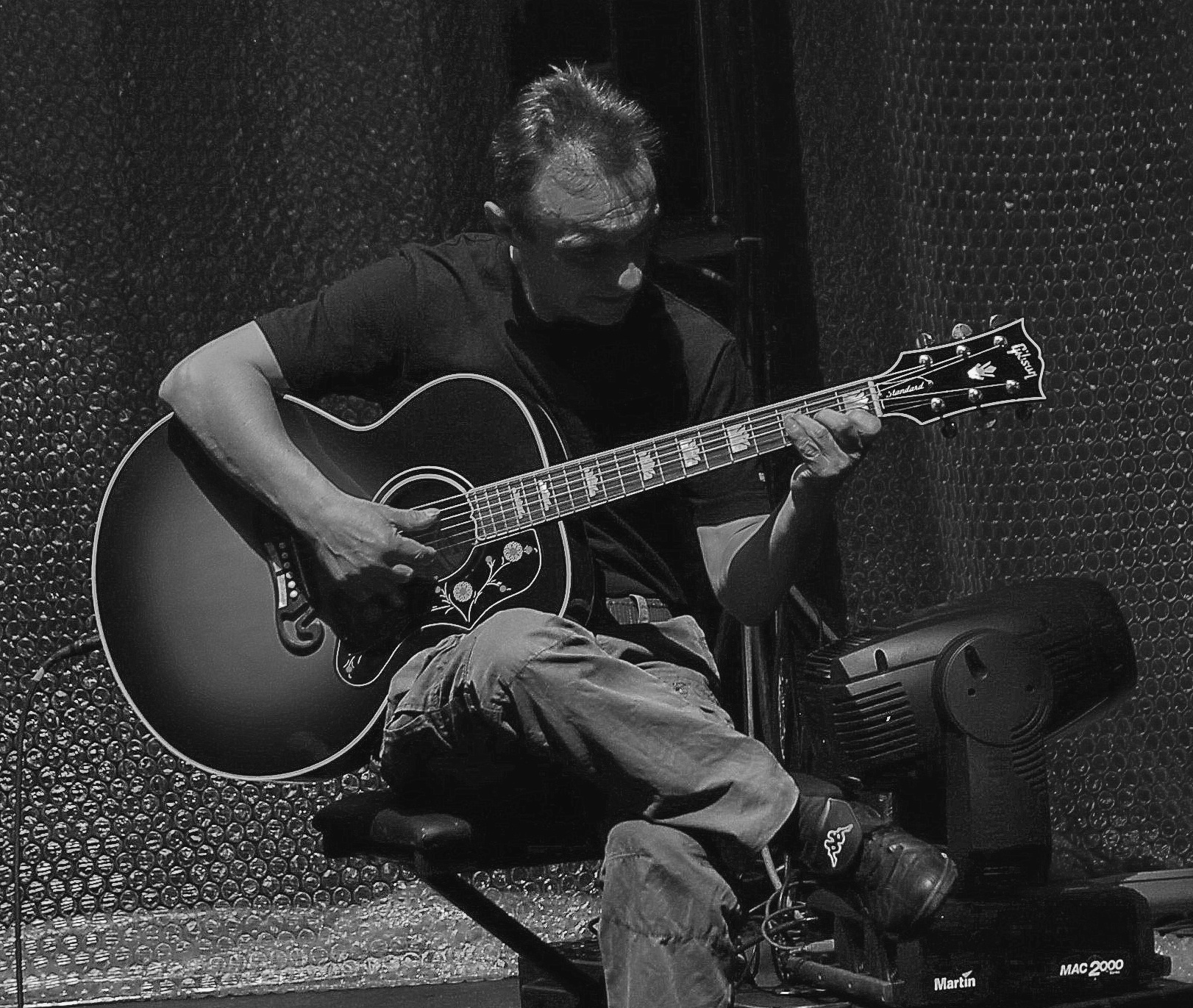
Guitarist Sławomir Piwowar (pictured) contributed significant guitar parts to the album.

Memento represents a refreshing of the band's sound. "Moja ziemio wyśniona" (lit. 'My dream world') draws from the jazz fusion scene. "Trójkąt radości" (lit. 'Triangle of happiness') is dominated by Piwowar's guitars, which he plays in a flamenco style.

"Strategia pulsu" continues the trend of fusion-inspired tracks, as well as displaying the band's proficiency in "boogie-funk". The title suite covers the entire second side of the album. The album is bookended by excerpts from Lob der Frauen by Johann Strauss.

== Track listing ==
Credits adapted from liner notes.

Original LP

No.	Title	Writer(s)	Length
1.	"Moja ziemio wyśniona"	Józef Skrzek, Julian Matej	8:39
2.	"Trójkąt radości"	Sławomir Piwowar	7:47
3.	"Strategia pulsu"	Jerzy Piotrowski, Apostolis Anthimos	3:29
4.	"Memento z banalnym tryptykiem"	Skrzek, Matej	20:56
Total length:			40:52

2005 bonus tracks

No.	Title	Writer(s)	Length
6.	"Z których krwi krew moja"	Skrzek, Matej	10:40
Total length:			51:32

== Release ==
The album was released on 16 February 1981, after the band had already split up.

The album has been reissued several times on CD, including by Metal Mind Productions and Yesterday.

== Reception and legacy ==
Memento z banalnym tryptykiem was considered to be the group's best Polish album since their debut.

In 2017, a poll of Radiowa Trójka listeners ranked the title suite as the 24th best Polish song of all time.

== Personnel ==
Credits adapted from liner notes.

- Józef Skrzek – keyboards (piano, polymoog, minimoog, micromoog, sonicsix moog, Hammond organ, clavinet, davolishint, Fender piano, concert spectrum), contrabass, banjo, cowbell, singing
- Apostolis Anthimos – acoustic guitar, electric guitar
- Jerzy Piotrowski – drums, percussion
- Sławomir Piwowar – acoustic guitar, electric guitar, clavinet, Fender piano
- Jan Skrzek – harmonica
