= The Rock (SBB album) =

Studio album by SBB
- Released: 29 October 2007
- Recorded: 2007
- Studios: Preisner Studio, Niepołomice, Poland
- Genre: progressive rock
- Length: 61:36
- Label: Metal Mind Productions

SBB chronology
New Century (2005)	The Rock (2007)	Iron Curtain (2009)

The Rock is a studio album by the Polish progressive rock band SBB. The album was released on 29 October 2007 by the label Metal Mind Productions. It was the band's first album with drummer Gábor Németh, previously a member of the groups Scorpió and P. Mobil. The album reached No. 30 on the OLiS chart in Poland.

== Track listing ==
From:

No.	Title	Lyrics	Music	Length
1.	"Skała"	Józef Skrzek	J. Skrzek	4:54
2.	"Płonące myśli"	Alina Skrzek	J. Skrzek	7:42
3.	"In Heaven And Hell"	J. Skrzek	J. Skrzek	7:02
4.	"Silence"	J. Skrzek	J. Skrzek	6:46
5.	"Sunny Day"	J. Skrzek	J. Skrzek	7:03
6.	"My Paradise"	J. Skrzek	Apostolis Anthimos	5:17
7.	"Pielgrzym"	Cyprian Kamil Norwid	Anthimos, J. Skrzek, Gábor Németh	8:16
8.	"Akri"	A. Skrzek	J. Skrzek	7:27
9.	"Zug a zene mindenhol"	Julian Matej, Tamás Somló	Anthimos, J. Skrzek	7:06

Bonus tracks:

No.	Title	Lyrics	Music	Length
10.	"Śpiewanie o imionach"	Maciej Mikos	Anthimos, J. Skrzek	5:13
11.	"Gazela"		Anthimos	4:33

== Personnel ==
Credits:

- Józef Skrzek – vocals, bass guitar, keyboards
- Apostolis Anthimos – guitar
- Gábor Németh – drums, percussion
- Tamás Somló – vocals (9)

== Charts ==
Country	Chart	Position
POL	OLiS	30
