= Jarosław Pijarowski =

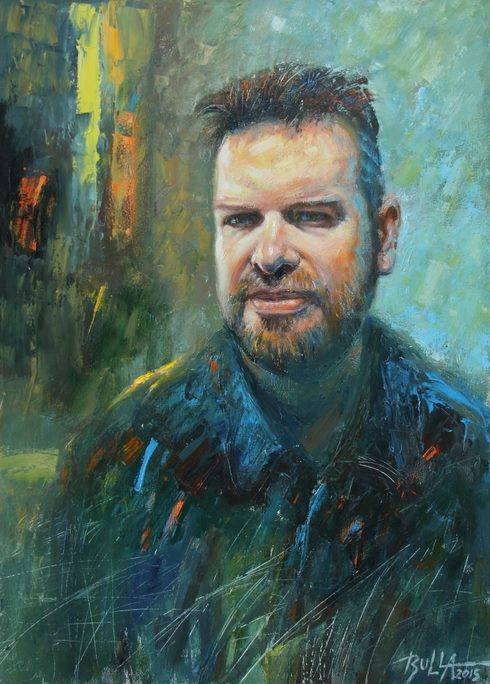
- Portrait of Jarosław Pijarowski, painted by Ignacy Bulla in 2015
- Born: Jarosław Pijarowski; 18 December 1971 (age 54); Bydgoszcz, Poland
- Musical career
- Genres: avant-garde, rock music, new wave, contemporary classical music, minimal music
- Years active: 1989 - present
- Label: Brain Active Records,

Jarosław Pijarowski (born 18 December 1971) is a Polish avant-garde artist, art curator and founder of Teatr Tworzenia (Theater of Creation). He creates contemporary music, poetry, photography, fine arts and theatre-music spectacles.

== Career ==
He began his art career in 1989, in Bydgoszcz, Poland. He has worked with Andrzej Przybielski, Michael Ogorodov Gong band, Józef Skrzek SBB, Tim Sanford, S. Ciesielski (Republika), Magdalena Abakanowicz, Franciszek Starowieyski, L. Goldyszewicz, E. Srzednicka, B. Raatz (Question Mark), Ł. Wodyński, Xavier Bayle, J. Kamiński, Jorgos Skolias, M. Maciejewski (Variete), (pl:Marek Piekarczyk) TSA band, Sambor i Paweł Dudziński, (pl:Wladyslaw Komendarek), J. Marszałek, (pl:Mariusz Benoit), Adam Ferency, Daniel Olbrychski, Derek Jacobi and many others.

From 2004 he is an honorary curator of Museum of Diplomacy in Poland. From 2016 he is a member of the board of HOMER - The European Medal of Poetry and Art appointed in Brussels. In September 2018 he became a juror at the Interdisciplinary Festival of the Arts "Miasto Gwiazd" (en:"City of Stars") in Żyrardów, and a member of the Artistic Honorary Committee of the above-mentioned festival. From 2018 he is the president of the prize committee World United Creator – Platinum Demiurge Award.

== Recent stage and musical-pageantry creations ==
- Zamek dźwięku (Castle of Sound) (2011), a monumental theatrical and musical spectacle (with J. Skolias, L. Goldyszewicz, S.Ciesielski, Tim Sanford, Ł. Wodyński and many more)
- Terrarium (2012) an avant-garde oratorio with Józef Skrzek, E. Srzednicka and choir
- Album Rodzi Inny (2012) with Krzysztof Toczko and many more
- Fukushima (2013), a musical performance with E. Srzednicka, S. Ciesielski and many others
- Martwa Natura – Live (2013) with W. Komendarek, E. Srzednicka, S. Ciesielski, M. Milczarek, B. Raatz, W. Knade and choir.
- Czasoprzestrzeń – Live Forever (2014) with Józef Skrzek, W. Komendarek, J. Skolias, S. Łobaczewski, Via Musica choir, E. Srzednicka, S. Ciesielski, J. Marszałek and M. Piekarczyk.
- Heaven on Earth – Live in Mózg (2014) with W. Komendarek, J. Skolias, J. Marszałek, A. Dudek-Dürer and L.Goldyszewicz.

== Literary works ==
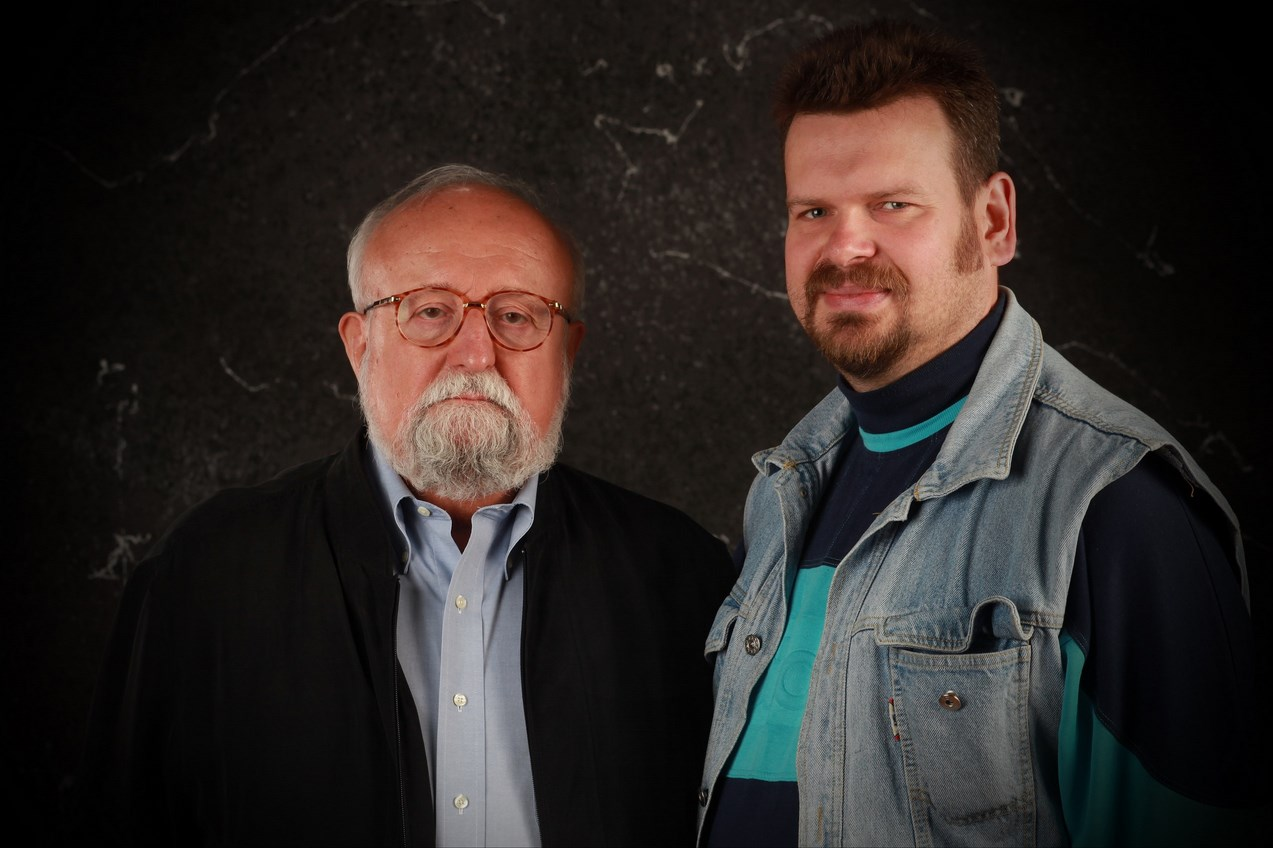
Krzysztof Penderecki & J.Pijarowski photo session for the album "The dream Off Penderecki" (2010)

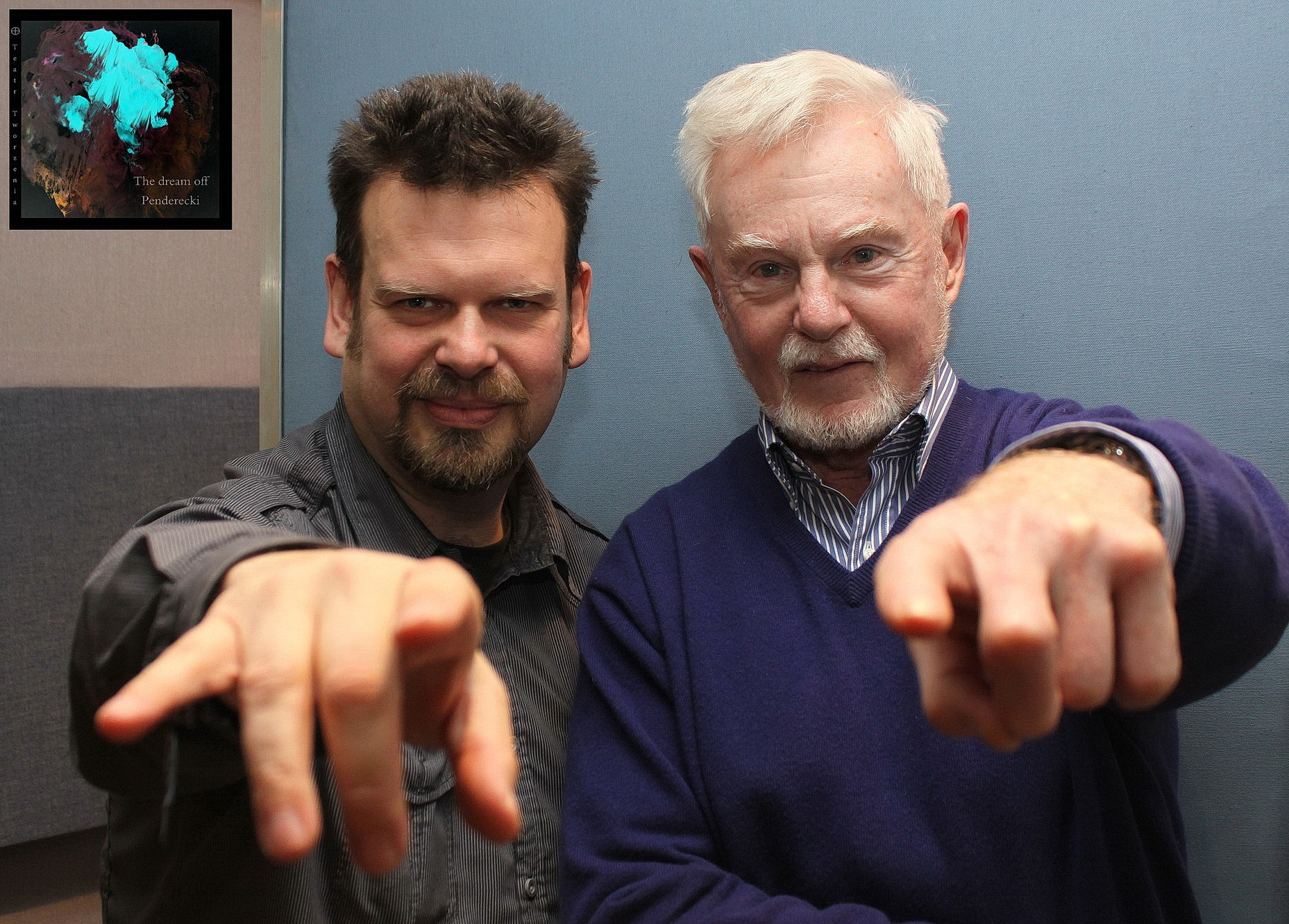
J. Pijarowski & Derek Jacobi during recording session "The dream Off Penderecki" (2013)

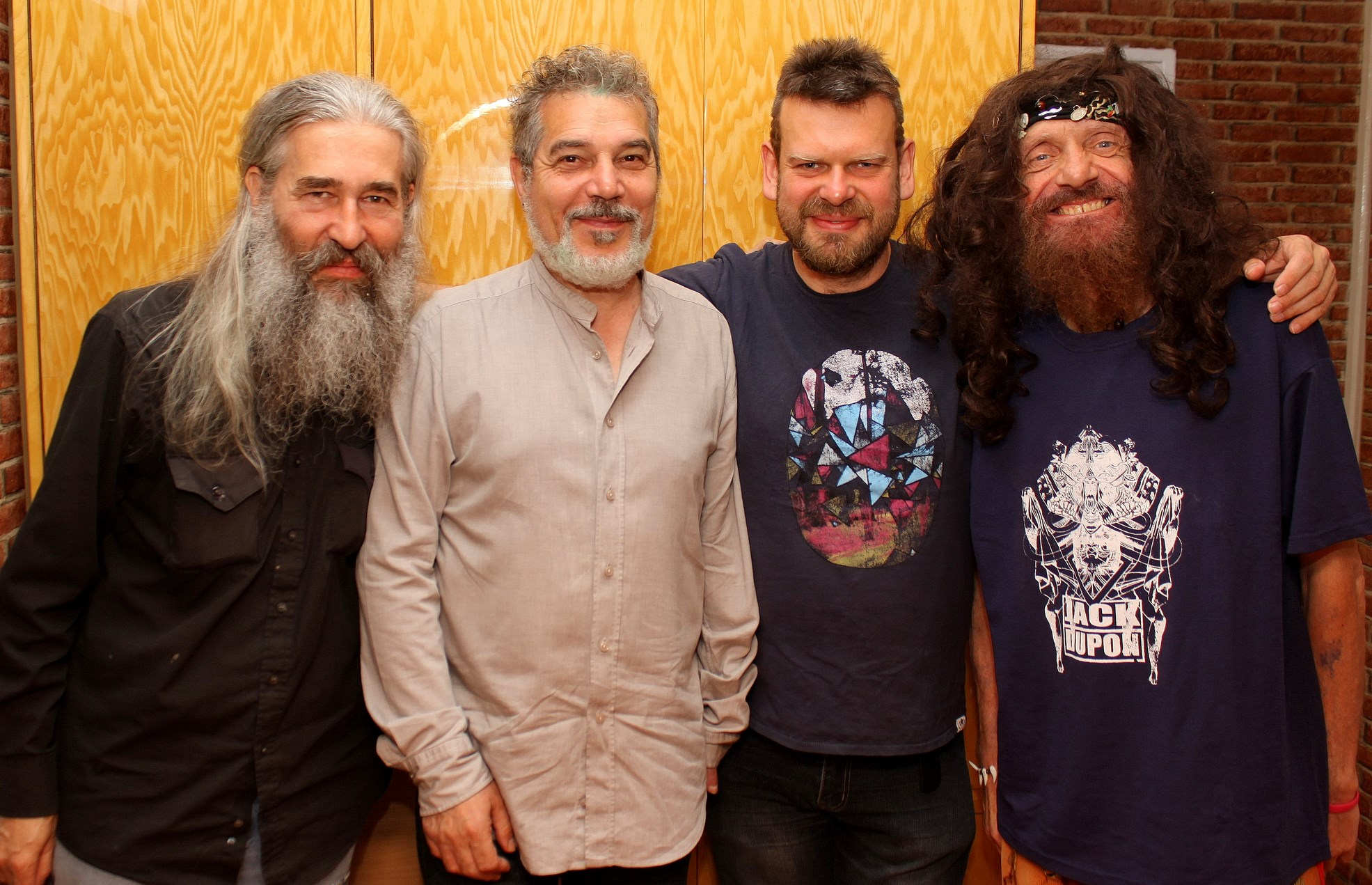
Andrzej Dudek-Dürer, Jorgos Skolias, Jarosław Pijarowski, Władysław Komendarek before the concert. (2014)

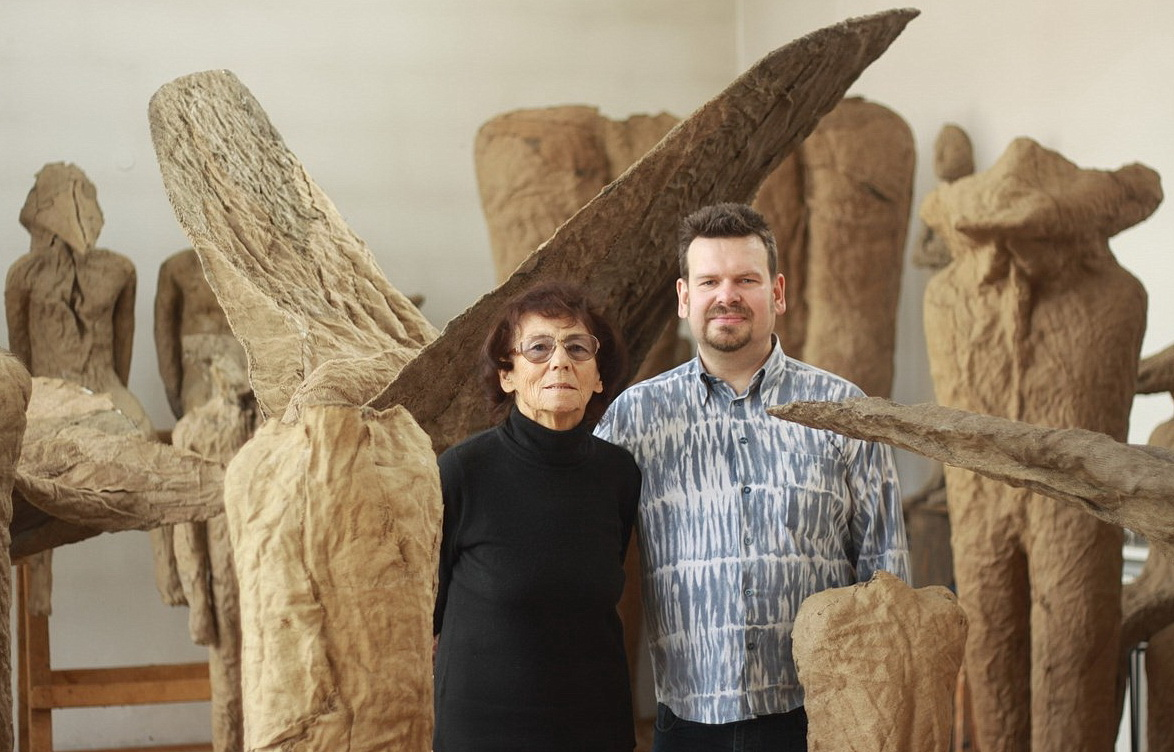
Magdalena Abakanowicz & J.Pijarowski during photo session before the exhibition.

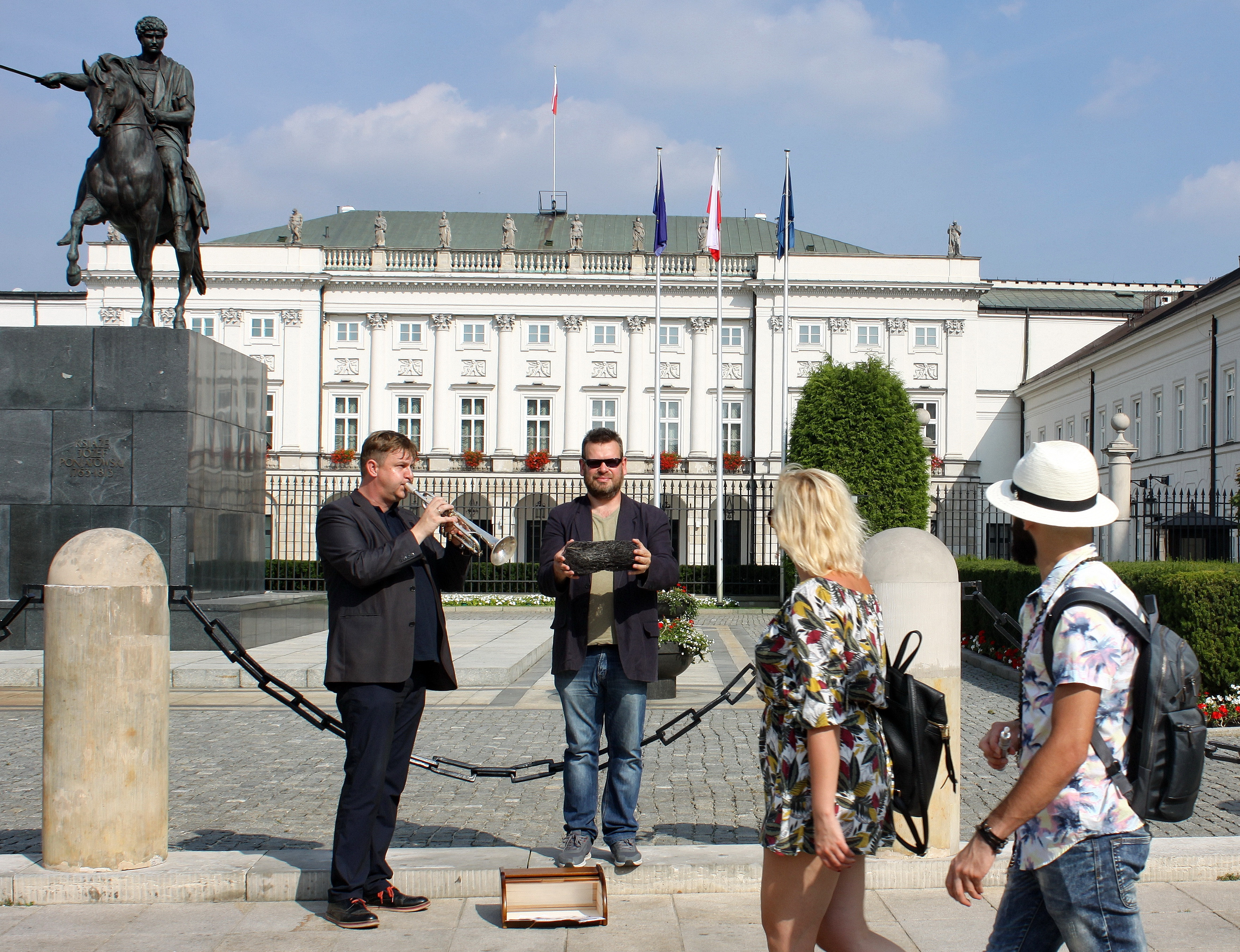
J. Marszałek & J. Pijarowski performance before Presidential Palace, Warsaw Poland (2015)

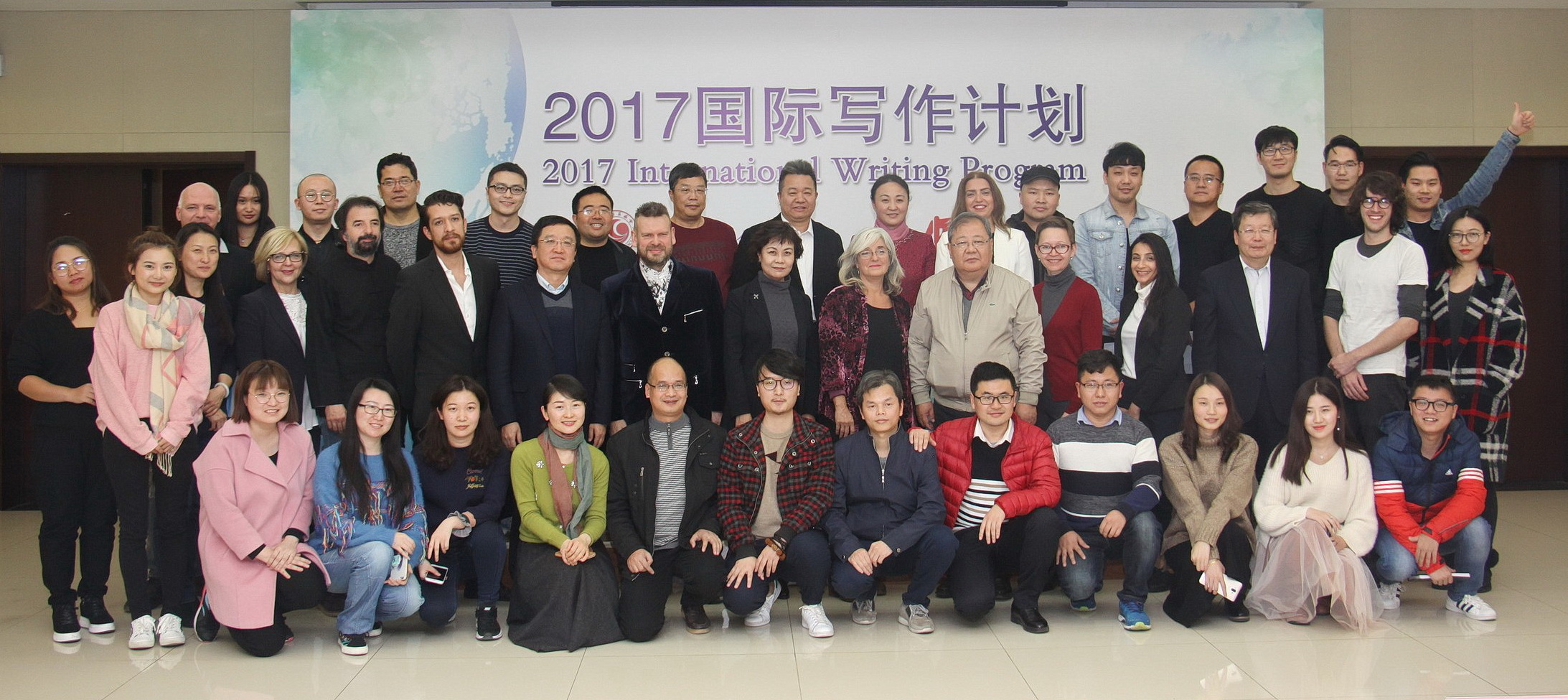
Tie Ning, Jidi Majia, Nurduran Duman, J.Pijarowski and many more of international guests during opening ceremony of The 1-st International Writing Program in Beijing (2017)

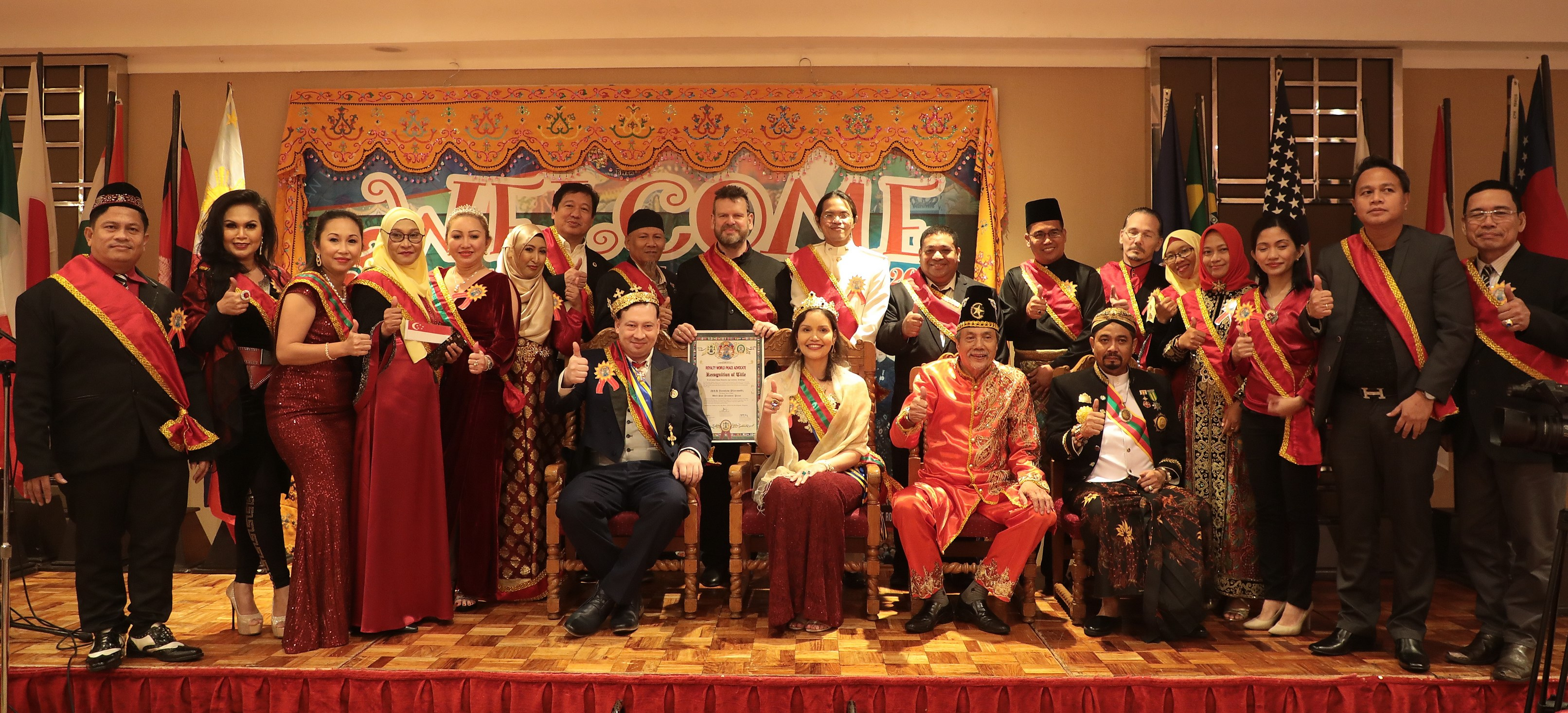
Pijarowski with the honorary diploma (State President/Prince) Manila 2019

- Kalendarz Cieni (1989)
- Usta spękane treścią (1998)
- Wyrok istnienia (1999)
- Usta spękane treścią (1998) maintenance release (Arcanusa)
- OFF - Życie bez dotacji (2015) (Arcanus & ICB)
- Empyrean Stones of Eagle Wings and Light (2017) Xichang - China
- Polish Poetry Issue (2019), (Shabdaguchha), USA ISBN 978-1-7330285-1-6
- Content Chapped Lips (2019) - Yale Club of New York City - USA - ISBN 978-0-89304-793-1

== Radio plays ==
- Gate 2012/2013 (2012) a radio play with. Adam Ferency, (pl:Mariusz Benoit), (pl:Marek Piekarczyk) and many others

== Discography ==
- Z archiwum IPN-u (2011) PRO-VOX
- PRO-VOX live (2012) DVD live recording in the Golub Dobrzyń
- Terrarium (2013) double album "Terrarium – Live in Bydgoszcz" & "Organ Works" - an avant-garde oratorio with Józef Skrzek and many others
- The dream Off Penderecki (2013) with Józef Skrzek, J. Skolias, T. Osiecki, Daniel Olbrychski, Derek Jacobi, choir, and many others
- Człowiek z Wysokiego Zamku (album) (2014) with Józef Skrzek, (pl:Władysław Komendarek) and J. Skolias
- Proteiny (Prawo Ojca) (limited edition – pendrive) with (pl:Marek Piekarczyk) (Brain Active Records)
- Requiem dla chwil minionych(2015) with Józef Skrzek (Brain Active Records)
- OFF - Życie bez dotacji (2015)
- Katharsis (A Small Victory) (2017)(Brain Active Records)
- Living After Life (2019)(Brain Active Records)
- Pandemonicon (2020) (Brain Active Records)

== Awards ==
In 2017 J. Pijarowski received the award of the name of Klemens Janicki-IANICIUS, of the merits of Polish culture.

In 2017 he and Józef Skrzek received the award of the name of Tadeusz Micinski - Feniks.

During The 3rd-International Peace Summit 2019 at Century Park, Sheraton Hotel, Manila, on November 30, 2019, he received from the Paramount Sultan of the Philippines - HH Sultanali Ampaso Umpa nobility title: Prince (Royalty World Peace Advocate).

In 2020 he received "Cross Cultural-Communications 50-th Anniversary Award" in New York City.

== Exhibitions and performances ==
- Czasoprzestrzeń i pochodne (1994), an exposition (photo–installation) with light and sound in Jan Kaja and Jacek Solińskiego Gallery
- Namioty Dantego (1995) concert, instalaction, performance (Zamek Książąt Pomorskich – Szczecin (coproduction with P. Badziąg) starring K. Szymanowski, W. Węgrzyn, Marcin Jahr
- II Przegląd Fotografii Bydgoskiej (1998) BWA – Bydgoszcz
- III Przegląd Fotografii Bydgoskiej (2000) BWA – Bydgoszcz
- Exhibition & Sound (2001), a photo exhibition with light and sound in the Alix gallery – Bydgoszcz
- IV Przegląd Fotografii Bydgoskiej (2002) BWA – Bydgoszcz
- Chwile Obecności -1979 – 2004 (2004) an exhibition to celebrate 25-years of Jan Kaja and Jacek Soliński - Gallery BWA – Bydgoszcz
- Przegląd Fotografii Bydgoskiej (2004) BWA – Bydgoszcz
- Frozen In Monitoring (2006) performance Hyde Park/Notting Hill – London
- Frozen in Monitoring (2006) performance (surroundings of Sex Machines Museum) Prague
- AutografExpo and Portrety z autografem (2008) (Muzeum Dyplomacji i Uchodźstwa Polskiego)
- Teatr Rysowania part 1 (2010) Fundacja Les Artes – Toruń (with Łukasz Wodyńsk and Xavier Bayle)
- sens 9449 – Grupa Dialogu (2010) concert & performanceMCK/Pianola Bydgoszcz
- Dźwięki Mowy – Grupa Dialogu (2010) M.Sankowska, K.Kornacka, J.Pijarowski, L.Goldyszewicz and others – Uniwersytet Muzyczny Fryderyka Chopina Warsaw
- Dźwięki Mowy - Dźwięk Nowy - Xperyment – Grupa Dialogu (2011) M.Sankowska, K.Kornacka, J.Pijarowski, L.Goldyszewicz and others – Uniwersytet Muzyczny Fryderyka Chopina Warsaw
- Teatr Rysowania part 2 (2011) Zakrzewo (with Ł. Wodyński and Xavier Bayle)
- Teatr Rysowania part 3-Finał (2011) Centrum Sztuki Współczesnej Toruń (with Ł. Wodyński and Xavier Bayle, featuring B. Raatz- guitar, sitar)
- Creativeness – 1971-1991-2011 -? (2011) exhibition, performance – Toruń – retrospective exhibition featuring as J. Pijarowski – L. Goldyszewicz
- Salon Fotograficzny 2011 (2011) exhibition – New York City - J. Pijarowski as the guest of honor, Polsko – Amerykański Klub Fotografika & Konsulat RP in New York City
- Made In Poland (2011), an exhibition Golub Dobrzyń
- PożegnaNieZmózgiem/CISZA - OPENCLOSE Grupa Dialogu & J.Pijarowski, L. Goldyszewicz and others
- Pamięci Andrzeja Przybielskiego (2012), a concert (with Teatr Performer) and exhibition – MCK/Pianola Bydgoszcz
- Retrospektywa mała (2013) Łomianki
- Retrospektywa duża (2013) CBR Warsaw
- Magdalena Abakanowicz//Pijarowski The Art Dimensions (Prologue - Warsaw) (2016) Warsaw
- Pijarowski - dialogues with... - Consulate General of Poland in New York (2017) New York City
- Identity - Culture and art in Pijarowski's works (1997–2017) (2017) – Gallery of Association of Polish Artists and Designers (2017) Gdańsk
- Pijarowski China Tour (2017)
  - "Stroll Through Paris", (Xichang Silk Road International Poetry Week) Zhaojue County,
  - "Letter to Xichang (W drodze do Xichang Silk Road International Poetry Week)", (Xichang Silk Road International Poetry Week) Xichang,
  - "The Taste of the Word", "The Milky Way of Literature", "The Light" - Lu Xun Academy, Normal University Beijing, (The First International Writing Program) Beijing,
  - "Stroll Through Beijing / Roots Bloody Roots" - Shanghai Writers Assiociation (The First International Writing Program) Shanghai
- "Pijarowski 5B Tour" - performance on Plaça d'Espanya in Barcelona - (August 2018)
- "Pijarowski Saint Tour & Gold Quest part I" - performance Malta - (January 2019)
- "Pijarowski Saint Tour & Gold Quest part II" - photo sessions Thailand & photo sessions, performance, lectures Cambodia - (February & March 2019)
- "Multidimensional Room" - Festival Labirynt 2019 - Frankfurt & Słubice (September 2019)
- "Content Chapped Lips - LIGHT" - J.Pijarowski - voice & Maksymilian Kubis (guitar) - Yale Club of New York City - USA - (November 2019)
- "No More War (Give Peace a Chance - tribute to J. Lennon)" - performance - Intramuros, Manila - Philippines - (November 2019)
- "The Taste of Poetry & Window of Life " - poetry performance & performance - Wieliczka, Cracow - Poland - (September 2020)
- „...be a part, be the art. JP in Germany” (Tribute 2 Joseph Beuys) – performance & art meetings – Düsseldorf, Germany – (June, July 2021)
- Concert & Exhibition: J.Pijarowski - Teatr Tworzenia & Friends "Let's Save Our Culture & Art" - April 2022 r. Bydgoszcz, Poland.
- Performance with Alexandr Rodin in Minsk (July, August 2022)

== Virtual reality ==
- The Abakanowicz Art Room (2016 - 2017) Warsaw

== Artist's books ==
- "7-th" of Pijarowski - Seven small porcelain portraits of seven polish artist in one porcelain book (e.g. Krzysztof Penderecki, Adam Makowicz, Janusz Głowacki, Rafał Blechacz) - Museum of Book Art in Poland (Muzeum Książki Artystycznej).
- Pandemonicon (Artist's book & music cd) 2020

== Charity works ==
- 2019-2025 - He was an Ambassador of International Human Rights Organization
