= Zenta Mauriņa =

Latvian writer

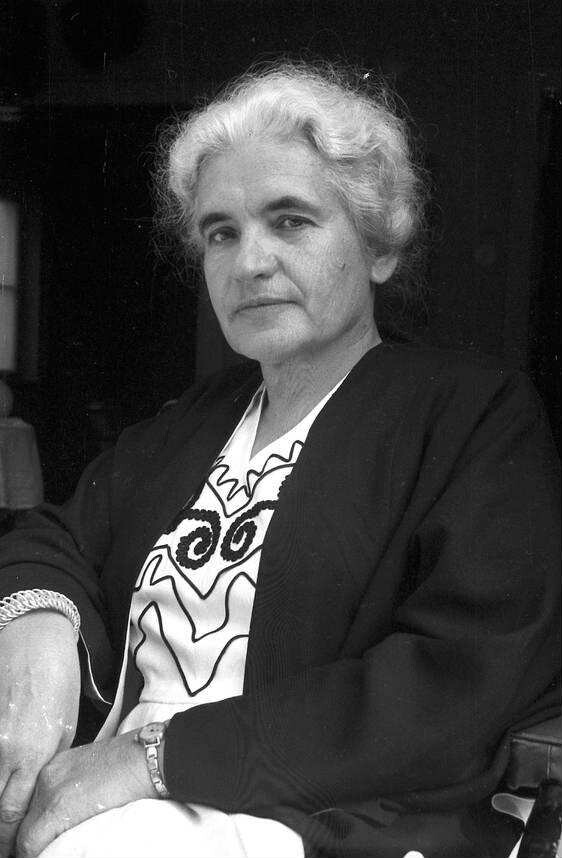
- Mauriņa in 1958
- Born: 15 December 1897; Lejasciems, Governorate of Livonia, Russian Empire
- Died: 25 April 1978 (aged 80); Basel, Switzerland
- Occupations: writer, essayist
- Spouse: Konstantīns Raudive
- Writing career
- Genre: Prose

Zenta Mauriņa (15 December 1897 – 25 April 1978) was a Latvian writer, essayist, translator, and researcher in philology. She was married to the Electronic Voice Phenomena researcher Konstantin Raudive. She was nominated for the 1973 Nobel Prize in Literature.

== Biography ==
Zenta Mauriņa was born on 15 December 1897 in Lejasciems, Governorate of Livonia, Russian Empire (now Latvia).

Born to doctor Roberts Mauriņš, Zenta spent her childhood in Grobiņa, where, at the age of six, she contracted polio; she used a wheelchair for the rest of her life. After studying at the Russian girls' high school in Liepāja (1913–1915), she studied philosophy at the Latvian University in Riga (1921–1923). After this, she studied philology of Baltic languages (1923–1927). She taught at the Latvian Teachers Institute and at the Latvian University in Riga and in Murmuiza, and achieved her doctorate in philology in 1938, researching the works of Latvian poet and philosopher, Fricis Bārda.

At the end of the Second World War, Mauriņa went into exile, first in Germany in 1944, and in 1946 in Sweden, where she became a lecturer at Uppsala University (1949–1963). In 1966, she moved to Bad Krozingen in southern Germany, where she was buried after her death. She died on 25 April 1978 in a hospital in Basel, Switzerland.

== Works ==
Up to 1944, Mauriņa published 19 books in Latvia, including monographs on Latvian writers Rainis, Jānis Poruks, Anna Brigadere and Fricis Bārda, as well as on Dostoyevsky and Dante. During this period, she also wrote her novel, Life on a Train (1941). After the war, she published 20 books in Latvian, and 27 in German, and her works have been widely translated into Italian, English, Russian, Swedish, Dutch, Finnish and Danish. Notable among her works in German are:

=== Works in Latvian ===
- Daži pamata motīvi Raiņa mākslā ("Some Basic Motifs in Raina's Art", 1928)
- Jānis Poruks un romantisms ("Jānis Poruks and Romanticism", 1929)
- Pārdomas un ieceres ("Thoughts and Ideas", 1934)
- Baltais ceļš ("The White Way", 1935)
- Dzīves apliecinātāji ("Affirmers of Life", 1935)
- Dante tagadnes cilvēka skatījumā ("Dante in the View of the Present Man", 1937, republished in 1952)
- Friča Bārdas pasaules uzskats ("Fritz Beard's Worldview", 1938)
- Saules meklētāji ("Sun Seekers", 1938)
- Grāmata par cilvēkiem un lietām ("A Book of Men and Things", 1938)
- Ziemeļu tēmas un variācijas ("Northern Themes and Variations", 1939)
- Neaizsūtītā vēstule ("The Unsent Letter", 1940)
- Dzīves vilcienā ("On the Train of Life", 1941)
- Prometeja gaismā ("Prometheus in the Light", 1943)
- Kultūras saknes ("Roots of Culture", 1944)
- Trīs brāļi ("Three Brothers", 1946)
- Tilti ("The Bridges", 1947)
- Sirds mozaīka ("Mosaic of the Heart", 1947)
- Spīts ("Spite", 1949)
- Uguns gari ("Spirits of Fire", 1951)
- Sāpju noslēpums ("The Secret of Pain", 1952)
- Frančeska ("Francesca", 1952)
- Latviešu esejas ("Latvian Essays", 1953)
- Traģiskais skaistums ("Tragic Beauty", 1954)
- Cilvēces sargi ("Guardians of Mankind", 1955)
- Tālā gaita ("The Long Walk", 1955: Autobiographical Novel – Part 1)
- Septiņi viesi ("Seven Guests", 1957)
- Iedrīkstēties ir skaisti ("To Dare Is Beautiful", 1958: Autobiographical Novel – Part 2)
- Dzelzs aizbīdņi lūst ("Iron Bolts Are Breaking", 1960: Autobiographical Novel – Part 3)
- Apnicība un steiga ("Boredom and Haste", 1962)
- Sākumā bija prieks ("In the Beginning There Was Joy", 1965)
- Trimdas traģika ("The Tragedy of Exile", 1965–1966: Swedish Diaries 1946–1951)
- Pasaules vārtos ("At the World's Gate", 1968: Swedish Diaries 1951–1958)
- Bērza tāss ("The Birch Tree", 1971)
- Dzintargraudi ("Ambergris", 1975)
- Zemes dziesma ("Song of the Earth", 1976)
- Manas saknes ir debesīs ("My Roots Are in the Sky", 1980: Diaries 1972–1978)

=== Works in German ===
- Mosaik des Herzens ("Mosaic of the Heart", 1947), essays
- Die weite Fahrt ("The Long Journey", 1951), autobiography
- Dostojewskij ("Dostoevsky", 1952), biography
- Die eisernen Riegel zerbrechen ("Iron Shutters Break", 1957)
- Im Anfang war die Freude ("In the Beginning There Was Joy", 1964), short stories
- Die Aufgabe des Dichters in unserer Zeit ("The Task of the Poet in Our Age", 1965), essays
- Porträts russischer Schriftsteller ("Portraits of Russian Writers", 1968), essays
- Kleines Orchester der Hoffnung ("The Little Orchestra of Hope", 1974), essays

== Awards ==
- Officer Cross, of the Order of Merit of the Federal Republic of Germany (1968)
- PBLA (World Free Latvians Association) Award (1969)
- Konrad Adenauer Prize, for literature (1971)
- Honorary citizen of Bad Krozingen (1977)
