= Teatr Tworzenia =

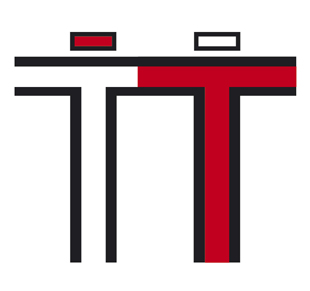
- logo of TT
- Formation: 2006
- Type: Theatre group
- Purpose: Contemporary music theater
- Notable members: Jarosław Pijarowski; Jorgos Skolias; Józef Skrzek

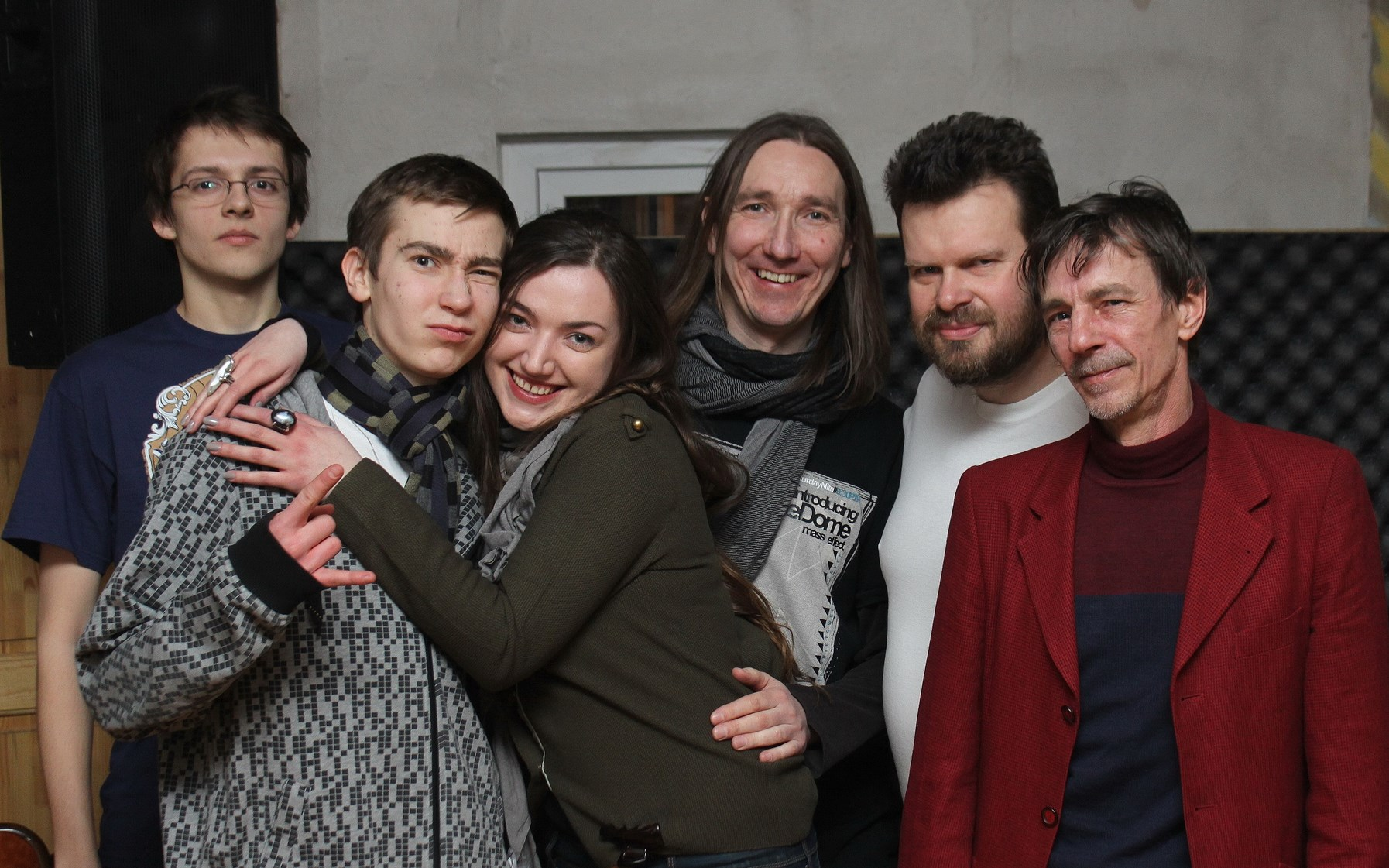
Teatr Tworzenia in preparation for the concert "Album Rodzi Inne"

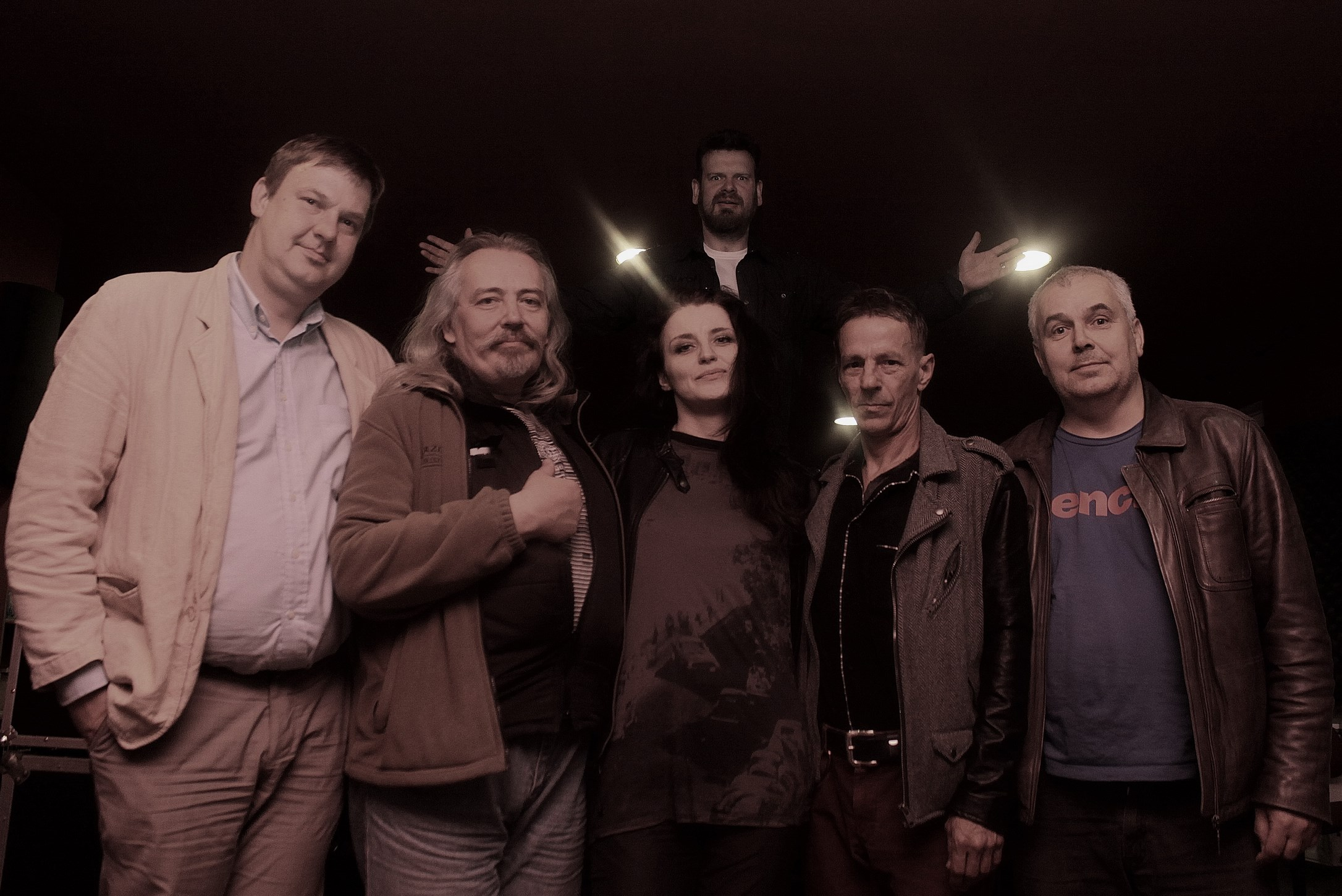
Teatr Tworzenia during the recording session composed by: J. Marszałek, M. Ogorodov, Eurazja Srzednicka, S. Ciesielski, Bogusław Raatz and J. Pijarowski

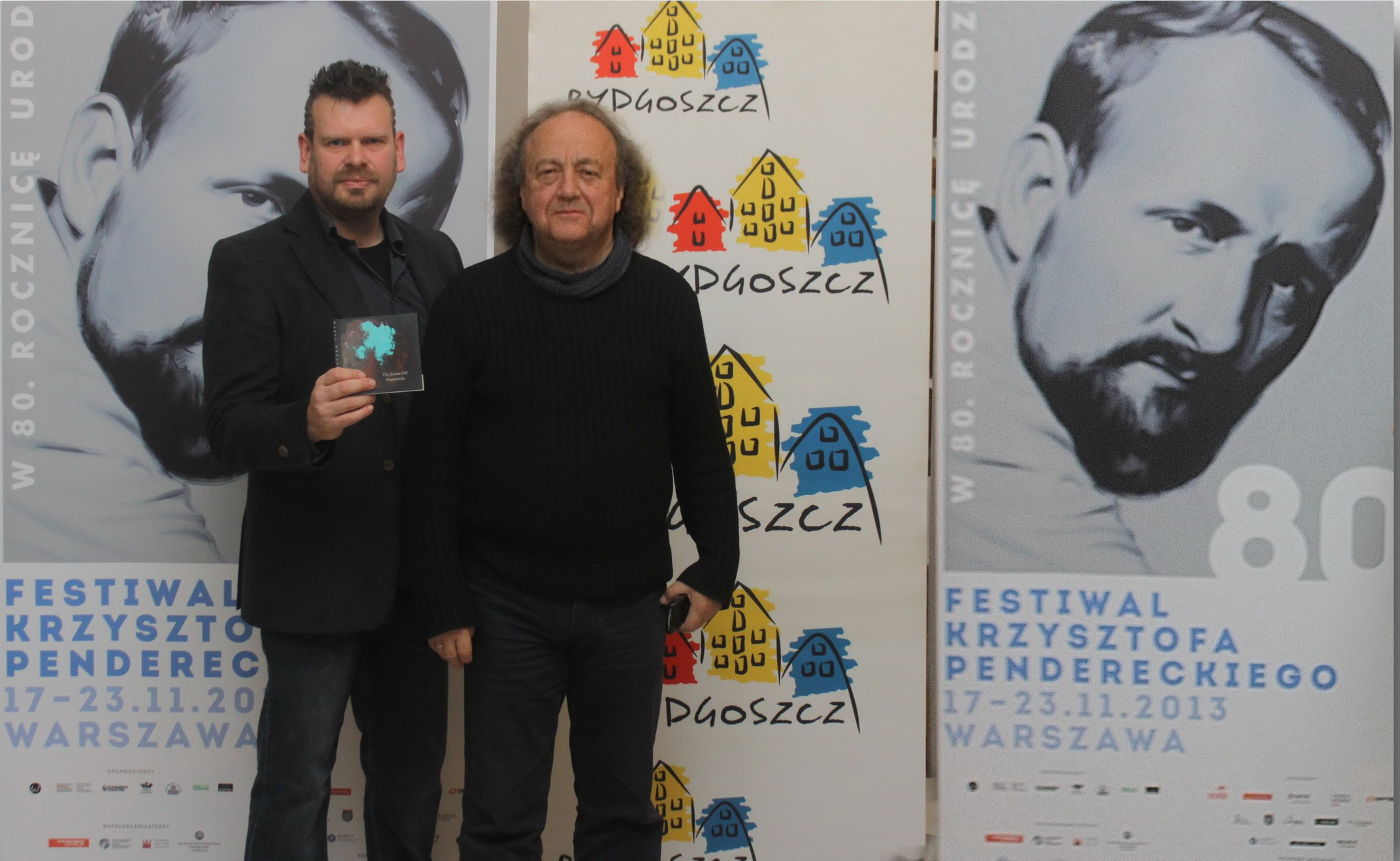
J. Pijarowski and J. Skrzek during the album's release: The dream Off Penderecki during the Krzysztof Penderecki Festival

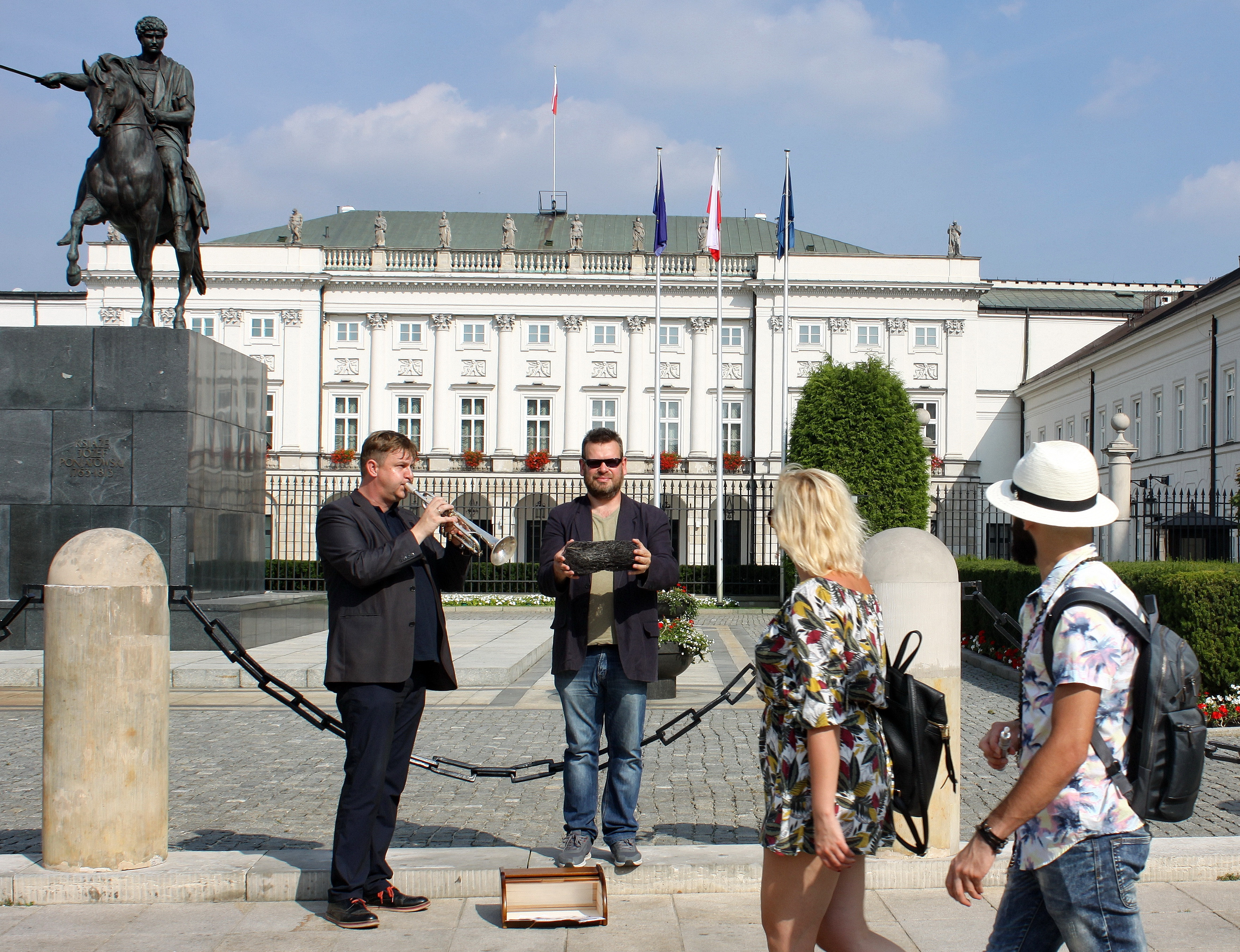
Performance of TT in front of the Presidential Palace in Warsaw (Magdalena Abakanowicz // J.Pijarowski - The Art Dimensions Exhibition).

Teatr Tworzenia, or The Theater of Creation, Polish avant-garde theater, founded by Jarosław Pijarowski. According to the author's definition it is: "Uninstitutionalized form of realization of creative ideas, consisting on intuitive-improvisational thematic activities; Have on the goal of integration and promotion of creative thought (word, music, theater, paintings) in audio-visual forms. The Theater of Creation does not have a permanent place, which is related to the idea -Live Act - live creation according to a previously accepted scenario, for the audience with no time, space or space constraints, more than once with the audience.

== History of Teatr Tworzenia (The Theater of Creation) ==
In the years 2006-2010 - the productions of The Theater of Creation were based on the basis of monographs and performative activities of Pijarowski (Scream Nudity, Di Logos Moon Di, Frozen in Monitoring) Warsaw, London and Prague. The turning point has become monumental a theatrical-musical spectacle entitled "Sound Castle" from the series:"Castles of Sound"; Realized at Golub-Dobrzyń Castle in 2011. Participants included: Jorgos Skolias - initiator "The Sound of Peace", drummer Sławomir Ciesielski, Boguslaw Raatz, Timothy Sanford, visual artist: Xavier Bayle, Lukasz Wodyński and others. Another great form was the first Polish avant-garde Oratorio "Terrarium" realized with Józef Skrzek in Saint Andrew Bobola's Church in Bydgoszcz. In 2013, in connection with the 80th birthday of Krzysztof Penderecki. The musical and theater project entitled:The dream Off Penderecki. In 2014 the first spectacle from the series "Czasoprzestrzeń - Live Forever " - based on J. Pijarowski's play: "Space-time", describing cases of the precursor life of Polish magic - Pan Twardowski. On the way back from the premiere of the show as the final show of the Bydgoszcz Festival "Ster on Bydgoszcz" there was a tragic accident, which was the suspension of the performance of The Theater of Creations.

== Artistic program ==
Pijarowski is the author of almost all texts by The Theater of Creation. Music is a result of creator and artist activities cooperating.

== Stage and performance forms (selection) ==
- „Frozen in monitoring” – performance (cycle),
- „Zamek Dźwięku” (Castle of Sound) – concert, show and movie,
- „Terrarium” – concert, show and record,
- „Gate 2012/2013” – radio broadcasting,
- „Album Rodzi Inny” – concert, performance, show,
- „Misty Mountain High” – recording session,
- „Fukushima LowTuDed” – concert - performance
- „Martwa Natura – Live” – concert - charity show,
- „The dream Off Penderecki” – record, concert,
- „Czasoprzestrzeń – Live Forever” – concert, performance, show,
- „Breakfast in the Exorcist’s brain” – recording session, show.

== Permanent artistic cooperation ==
- Music:
  - Keyboard instruments, Organ (music)s – Józef Skrzek, Władysław Komendarek (till 2014 year)
  - Chordophone – Bogusław Raatz, Waldemar Knade
  - Wind instrument, trumpet – Jakub Marszałek
  - Percussion instruments – Sławomir Ciesielski (till 2014 year), Marcin Jahr
  - Harmonica – Michał Kielak
  - Voc – Jorgos Skolias, Eurazja Srzednicka (till 2014 year), Marek Piekarczyk
  - Choir – Via Musica
  - Conductors – Sławomir Łobaczewski, Bogdan Żywek

== Artists collaborating occasionally ==
- actors: Derek Jacobi, Daniel Olbrychski, Mariusz Benoit, Adam Ferency
- musicians: Andrzej Nowak, Damian Pietrasik, Michał Milczarek, Marcelina Sankowska, Paulina Heyer, Małgorzata Sanford, Robert Bielak, Tim Sanford, Marek i Krzysztof Kroschel, Ryszard Lubieniecki, Maciej Myga, Andrzej Przybielski, Krzysztof Toczko, Mikołaj Toczko, Misha Ogorodov, M.P. Szumski, Tomasz Osiecki, Andrzej Borzym, Michał Straszewski, Radosław Zaworski, Glass Duo
- artists: Stanislaw Baj, Władysław Wałęga, Leszek Goldyszewicz, Jacek Kamiński, Łukasz Wodyński, Xavier Bayle, Marek Ronowski, Alina Bloch, Małgorzata Grydniewska
- others: Robert Bernatowicz, Zdzisław Pająk, Andrzej Gawroński, Iwona Wasilewska

== Discography ==
=== Albums ===
- Terrarium – Live in Bydgoszcz
- The dream Off Penderecki
- Katharsis (A Small Victory) (2017)(Brain Active Records)
- Living After Life (2019)

=== Varia ===
- OFF - Życie bez dotacji – music documentation of Teatr Tworzenia (compositions:8, 9, 10, 18, 19).

== Illustrative formations of The Theater of Creation ==
- The Hidden Dimensions of M. Ronowski Paintings – Bydgoszcz, Hotel City (2014)
- The Paintings Exhibition of the Władysław Wałęga – „Ogrody Wyobraźni”, Kujawsko-Pomorskie Centrum Kultury w Bydgoszczy (2015)
- Interdisciplinary Exhibition of the Abakanowicz /Pijarowski - The Art Dimensions (Prologue - Warsaw)(2016)

== Bibliography ==
- OFF - Życie bez dotacji – The book about live and musical actions of The Theatre of Creations – (2006–2015).
