= Konstantīns Raudive =

Latvian writer and parapsychologist (1909–1974)

- Born: 30 April 1909; Asūne parish, Vitebsk Governorate, Russian Empire
- Died: 2 September 1974 (aged 65); Bad Krozingen, West Germany
- Occupations: Writer; parapsychologist
- Spouse: Zenta Mauriņa

Konstantīns Raudive (30 April 1909 in Asūne, Vitebsk Governorate – 2 September 1974), known internationally as Konstantin Raudive, was a Latvian writer and parapsychologist, and husband of Zenta Mauriņa. Raudive was born in Latgale in eastern Latvia (then part of Vitebsk Governorate) but studied extensively abroad, later becoming a student of Carl Jung. In exile following the Soviet re-occupation of Latvia in 1944, he taught at the University of Uppsala in Sweden.

Raudive studied parapsychology all his life, and was especially interested in the possibility of the afterlife. He and German parapsychologist Hans Bender investigated electronic voice phenomena (EVP). He published a book on EVP, Breakthrough, in 1971. Raudive was a scientist as well as a practising Roman Catholic.

== EVP research ==
In 1964, Raudive read Friedrich Jürgenson's book, Voices from Space, and was so impressed by it that he arranged to meet Jürgenson in 1965. He then worked with Jürgenson to make some EVP recordings, but their first efforts bore little fruit, although they believed that they could hear very weak, muddled voices. According to Raudive, however, one night, as he listened to one recording, he clearly heard a number of voices. When he played the tape over and over, he came to believe he understood all of them. He thought some of which were in German, some in Latvian, some in French. The last voice on the tape, according to Raudive, a woman's voice, said "Ve a dormir, Margarete" ("Go to sleep, Margaret").

Raudive later wrote (in his book Breakthrough):

These words made a deep impression on me, as Margarete Petrautzki had died recently, and her illness and death had greatly affected me.

Raudive started researching such alleged voices on his own and spent much of the last ten years of his life exploring EVP. With the help of various electronics experts, he recorded over 100,000 audiotapes, most of which were made under what he described as "strict laboratory conditions." He collaborated at times with Bender. Over 400 people were involved in his research, and all apparently heard the voices. This culminated in the 1968 publication of Unhörbares wird hörbar (“What is inaudible becomes audible”). The book was published in English in 1971 as Breakthrough.

== Methods ==
Raudive developed several different approaches to recording EVP:

- Microphone voices: one simply leaves the tape recorder running, with no one talking; he indicated that one can even disconnect the microphone.
- Radio voices: one records the white noise from a radio that is not tuned to any station.
- Diode voices: one records from what is essentially a crystal set, not tuned to a station.

== EVP characteristics ==
Raudive delineated a number of characteristics of the voices, (as laid out in Breakthrough):

1. "The voice entities speak very rapidly, in a mixture of languages, sometimes as many as five or six in one sentence."
2. "They speak in a definite rhythm, which seems forced on them."
3. "The rhythmic mode imposes a shortened, telegram-style phrase or sentence."
4. Probably because of this, "… grammatical rules are frequently abandoned and neologisms abound."

== Cultural references ==
A sample of the tape was used by The Smiths in their song "Rubber Ring".

== Sources ==
- Konstantins Raudive (1971). Breakthrough: An Amazing Experiment in Electronic Communication with the Dead. Smythe. ISBN 978-0-900675-54-6.
