= Imants Barušs =

Canadian educator

Imants Barušs is Professor of Psychology at King's University College at the University of Western Ontario, Canada.

== Background ==
He started out in engineering science on a scholarship at the University of Toronto, but then became preoccupied with existential questions, leading him into unconventional areas of study, with the result that he graduated in 1974 with an interdisciplinary BSc. After some years working as a roofer, he enrolled at the University of Calgary and, in 1983, completed an MSc in mathematics with specialization in mathematical foundations, writing his thesis about forcing in topoi. He switched to psychology graduating in 1989 from the University of Regina with a PhD in psychology and specialization in the study of consciousness. Since 1987 he has been teaching courses in psychology, mostly about consciousness, at King's University College, where he has risen to the rank of professor. He has served in a number of administrative roles including Chair of the Department of Psychology and member of the Senate of the University of Western Ontario, and belongs to various professional organizations including the Society for Scientific Exploration and the New York Academy of Sciences.

== Research interests ==
His interest is in all aspects of consciousness studies although his research has been focussed primarily on quantum consciousness, altered states of consciousness, self-transformation, mathematical modeling of consciousness, and beliefs about consciousness and reality.

== Books ==
- Death as an Altered State of Consciousness: A Scientific Approach (American Psychological Association, 2023). This book delves into the mysteries of death, examining it as an altered state of consciousness rather than just oblivion. Exploring topics such as after-death communication, mediumship, instrumental transcommunication, near-death experiences, past-life experiences, and other anomalous phenomena related to death, the author sifts through scientific data to better understand the properties and possible continuance of consciousness. The book aims to widen the reader's perspective and address the educational gap for researchers, teachers, and practitioners working on this often-neglected subject matter.
- Science as a Spiritual Practice (Imprint Academic, 2007) This book argues that there are problems with materialism and that self-transformation could lead individual scientists to more comprehensive ways of understanding reality. It also contains an analysis of the philosophy of Franklin Merrell-Wolff and his mathematical approach to spirituality.
- Alterations of Consciousness: An Empirical Analysis for Social Scientists (American Psychological Association, 2003). The book is an overview of alterations of consciousness such as daydreaming, sleep, dreaming, hypnosis, and psychedelics.
- Authentic Knowing: The Convergence of Science and Spiritual Aspiration (Purdue University Press, 1996) This book tries to show how science and spiritual aspiration converge on fundamental questions about the nature of consciousness and reality when authentically pursued. The book includes chapters about authenticity (what it means to be true to oneself), science (what happens when science encounters the sublime), transcendence, theory (a theosophical model of reality), and self-transformation (adventures and misadventures of a spiritual aspirant).
- The Personal Nature of Notions of Consciousness: A Theoretical and Empirical Examination of the Role of the Personal in the Understanding of Consciousness(University Press of America, 1990) This book is his doctoral dissertation in which Baruss and his supervisor Robert Moore tried to circumscribe the state of scientific knowledge concerning consciousness in the mid-1980s and to better understand the disparity of notions of consciousness of the scientists and academics studying it. What we found, both through theoretical and empirical investigation, was that there is a material-transcendent dimension concerning beliefs about consciousness and reality that underlies the Western intellectual tradition, which, in particular, colours the manner in which research about consciousness is conducted.

== Notes and references ==
- Basic information from Author's website
