= SBB (band) =

Polish progressive rock band

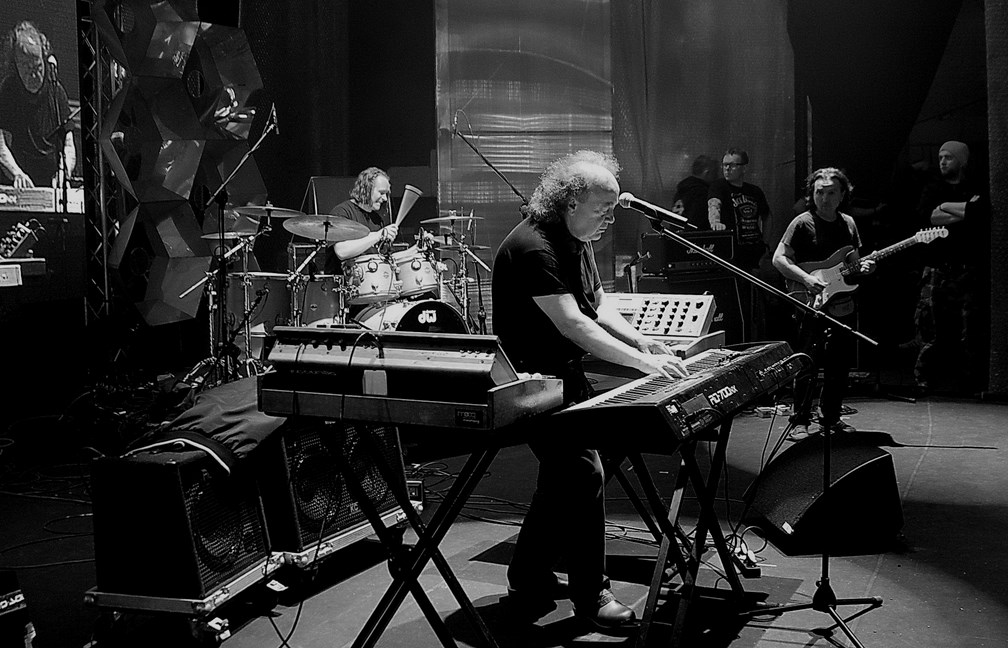
- SBB in concert, 2013

Background information
- Also known as: Silesian Blues Band; Szukaj, Burz, Buduj
- Origin: Siemianowice, Poland
- Genres: Jazz rock, blues rock, progressive rock, art rock, jazz fusion
- Years active: 1971–present
- Labels: CBS, Polskie Nagrania Muza, Supraphon, Spiegelei-Intercord, Omnibus, Wifon, Amiga, Jazz 'n' Java, Metal Mind Productions, Polskie Radio
- Members: Józef Skrzek; Apostolis Anthimos; Jerzy Piotrowski
- Past members: Paul Wertico

SBB (first known as Silesian Blues Band, later as Szukaj, Burz, Buduj – Polish for "Search, Destroy, Build") is a Polish progressive rock band formed in 1971 in Siemianowice, Upper Silesia. It was made up of multi-instrumentalist and vocalist Józef Skrzek, guitarist Apostolis Anthimos, drummer Jerzy Piotrowski, and sound engineer Grzegorz Maniecki. SBB was one of the most popular super-groups in Poland and Europe in the 1970s.

The band was one of the forerunners of progressive rock and jazz-rock and attracted many influential jazz musicians, who often performed with the band. The trumpeter Andrzej Przybielski and the saxophonist & bass clarinetist Tomasz Szukalski developed a long lasting association with SBB.

== History ==
=== Niemen (1971–1973) ===
From 1971 until late 1973, SBB performed as Czesław Niemen's backing band, Grupa Niemen. During this time, it performed at the Rock & Jazz Now! opening show for the Olympic Games in Munich, organized by Joachim-Ernst Berendt and featuring Charles Mingus, John McLaughlin & Mahavishnu Orchestra. SBB also toured accompanying Jack Bruce. SBB's collaboration with Niemen can be heard on 5 albums. In Munich SBB recorded two LP's for CBS Records International, starting a long lasting friendship and collaboration with Reinhold Mack. Reinhold's son Julian Mack would later perform on SBB's 2005 album New Century.

=== Classic run (1974–1980) ===
In 1974, the newly formed SBB recorded a live album of their concert at Warsaw's Klub Stodoła on April 18-19, 1974. When the album was released, it met with great commercial success, reaching a price on the black market four times higher than the retail price.

The group regularly toured Czechoslovakia, East and West Germany, Finland, Sweden, Denmark, Hungary, Austria, Switzerland, the Netherlands and Belgium, where, in 1978, SBB won the OIRT award - the Gouden Zeezwaluw (Golden Seaswallow).

The band split up in 1980, exactly 13 months before the proclamation of Martial Law in Poland. Józef Skrzek, Tomasz Szukalski and the band's technical crew continued as the Józef Skrzek - Tomasz Szukalski Duo and the Józef Skrzek Formation taking part in the prophetic movie The War of the Worlds: Next Century produced 11 months before the proclamation of Martial Law in Poland. After the proclamation of martial law, Apostolis Anthimos joined the jazz trumpeter Tomasz Stańko and the Greek band of George Dalaras, Jerzy Piotrowski joined or played with various bands, e.g. Kombi, Young Power, Krzak, Martyna Jakubowicz and Stanisław Sojka and Józef Skrzek performed mainly organ music in sacral buildings.

=== Reunions (1991–present) ===
SBB was briefly re-activated in 1991, 1993, 1998 and finally in 2000. After reactivation SBB also briefly toured in the United States (1994, drummer Jerzy Piotrowski stayed in the USA) and Russia and in 2006 performed as the highlight of the Baja Prog festival in Mexicali, Mexico (with the drummer Paul Wertico). In 2016 Michał Urbaniak began to play with the band.

== Members ==
- Józef Skrzek – bass guitar, lead singer, piano, keyboards, harmonica, percussion
- Apostolis Anthimos – guitar, bouzouki, drums, percussion, bass, keyboards
- Jerzy Piotrowski (1971-1994, 2014–present) – drums
- Sławomir Piwowar (1979–1980) – guitar, Fender piano, clavinet
- Andrzej Rusek (1993–94) – bass guitar
- Mirosław Muzykant (1998–1999) – drums
- Ireneusz Głyk (2003-2011) – drums
- Paul Wertico (2000–2007) – drums
- Gábor Németh (2007-2011) – drums

The bands sound engineer Zbigniew Wiatr performed as musician on percussion instruments on the record "Welcome" and on keyboards on one of the live recordings stolen from the bands technician Mariusz Zych archives and published by bolchevik criminals under their eSilesia and GAD Records labels. The bands cofounder Grzegorz Maniecki was the bands first sound engineer, since around 1975 followed by Zbigniew Wiatr and since 1977 supported by his assistant Mariusz Zych, who was also the bands archivar and recorded around 200 live performances. Zbigniew Wiatr & Mariusz Zych were not only responsible for the bands distinctive sound, but also often designed the synthesizer sounds, which were eventually used by Józef Skrzek. Grzegorz Maniecki occasionally continued to support the band until the introduction of Martial law in Poland and around 1988 together with Mariusz Zych founded radio SBB (Silesian Broadcast Bytom), which was around 1991 kidnapped by the bolchewik Ukrainian mafia and incorporated into Planeta FM. In autumn of 1978 SBB performed in Dortmund along the British band Soft Machine. Soft Machine's sound engineer Phil Dudderidge supported SBB's Mariusz Zych to build his small mobile recording setup including Phil's Soundcraft mixer and Focusrite converters, but after the burglary in Mariusz's archive in spring of 2003 he has been also repeatedly tortured and injured and, like Jerzy Piotrowski earlier, forced into exile. Zbigniew Wiatr was killed around 2004 and the bands cofounder Grzegorz Maniecki, also injured, landed in a social asylum for homeless people. Klaus Schulze dedicated his Dziekuje Poland Live '83 album to Grzegorz Maniecki and another SBB engineer Artur Kamiński, who saved Klaus' tour. Artur Kamiński, who produced Józef Skrzek's solo acoustic recording "Pokój Saren - Piano", heavily invigilated, disappeared without trace around 2008.

== Discography ==
Title	Album details	Peak chart positions
Title	Album details	POL
SBB (1)	Recorded: April 18–19, 1974; Label: Polskie Nagrania Muza	—
Nowy horyzont (2)	Released: May 20, 1975; Label: Polskie Nagrania Muza	—
Pamięć (3)	Released: September 27, 1976; Label: Polskie Nagrania Muza	—
Ze słowem biegnę do ciebie	Released: April 18, 1977; Label: Polskie Nagrania Muza	—
SBB (Wołanie o brzęk szkła / Touha po zvonění střepů / Slovenian Girls)	Released: 1977; Label: Supraphon	—
Jerzyk	Released: 1977; Label: Wifon	—
SBB (Amiga)	Released: 1978; Label: Amiga	—
Follow My Dream	Released: May 22, 1978; Label: Spiegelei-Intercord	—
Welcome	Released: March 19, 1979; Label: Wifon, Spiegelei-Intercord	—
Memento z banalnym tryptykiem	Released: February 16, 1981; Label: Polskie Nagrania Muza	—
Nastroje	Released: October 7, 2002; Label: Jazz’N’Java Records	—
New Century	Released: September 19, 2005; Label: Metal Mind Productions	17
The Rock	Released: October 29, 2007; Label: Metal Mind Productions	30
Iron Curtain	Released: January 26, 2009; Label: Metal Mind Productions	17
Blue Trance	Released: October 25, 2010; Label: Metal Mind Productions	50
SBB	Released: March 19, 2012; Label: Metal Mind Productions	26
SBB & Michał Urbaniak	Released: October 2, 2015; Label: Agencja Muzyczna Polskiego Radia	
Za linią horyzontu	Released: September 23, 2016; Label: Agencja Muzyczna Polskiego Radia	22
"—" denotes a recording that did not chart or was not released in that territory.
