= Jerzy Piotrowski =

Polish drummer

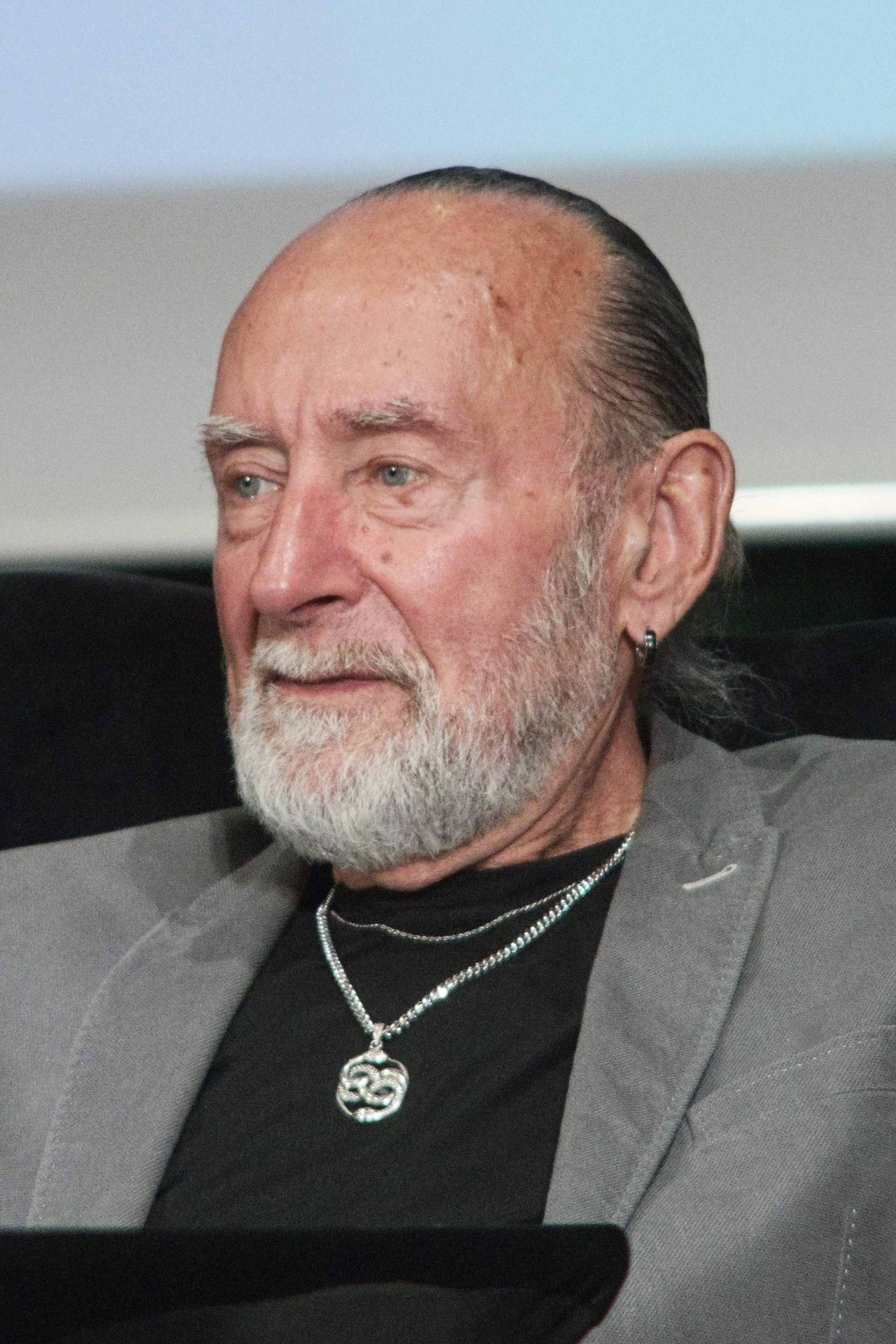
- Piotrowski in 2024

Background information
- Born: 9 February 1950 (age 75); Poland
- Genres: Jazz-rock, progressive rock, jazz, blues rock
- Instruments: drums
- Member of: SBB

Jerzy Piotrowski, also known as Keta (born 9 February 1950) is a Polish jazz-rock drummer.

== Career ==
He has played on LPs for many artists, including Czesław Niemen, SBB, Kombi, Young Power, Pick Up, Krzysztof Ścierański, Ireneusz Dudek, Dżem, Martyna Jakubowicz, and Stanisław Sojka.

He is the author of the textbook Szkoła na perkusję. Between 1990 and 1994, he conducted percussion workshops in Puławach. In 1994, he immigrated to the United States.
