= Marcin Jahr =

Polish jazz drummer

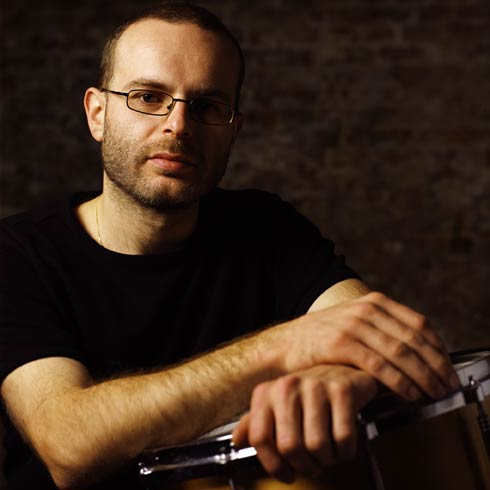
Marcin Jahr

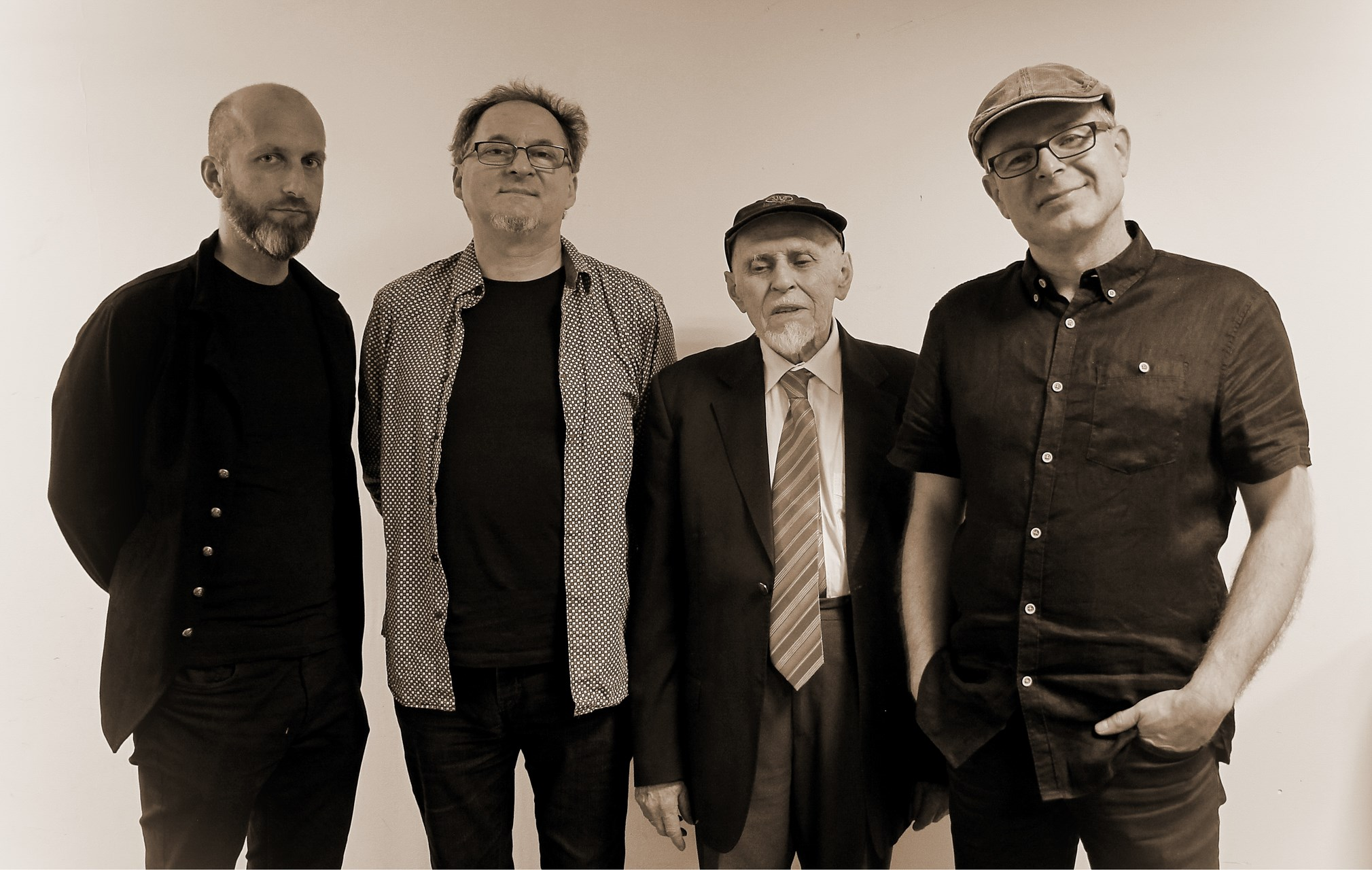
Jan Ptaszyn Wróblewski Quartet (2017)

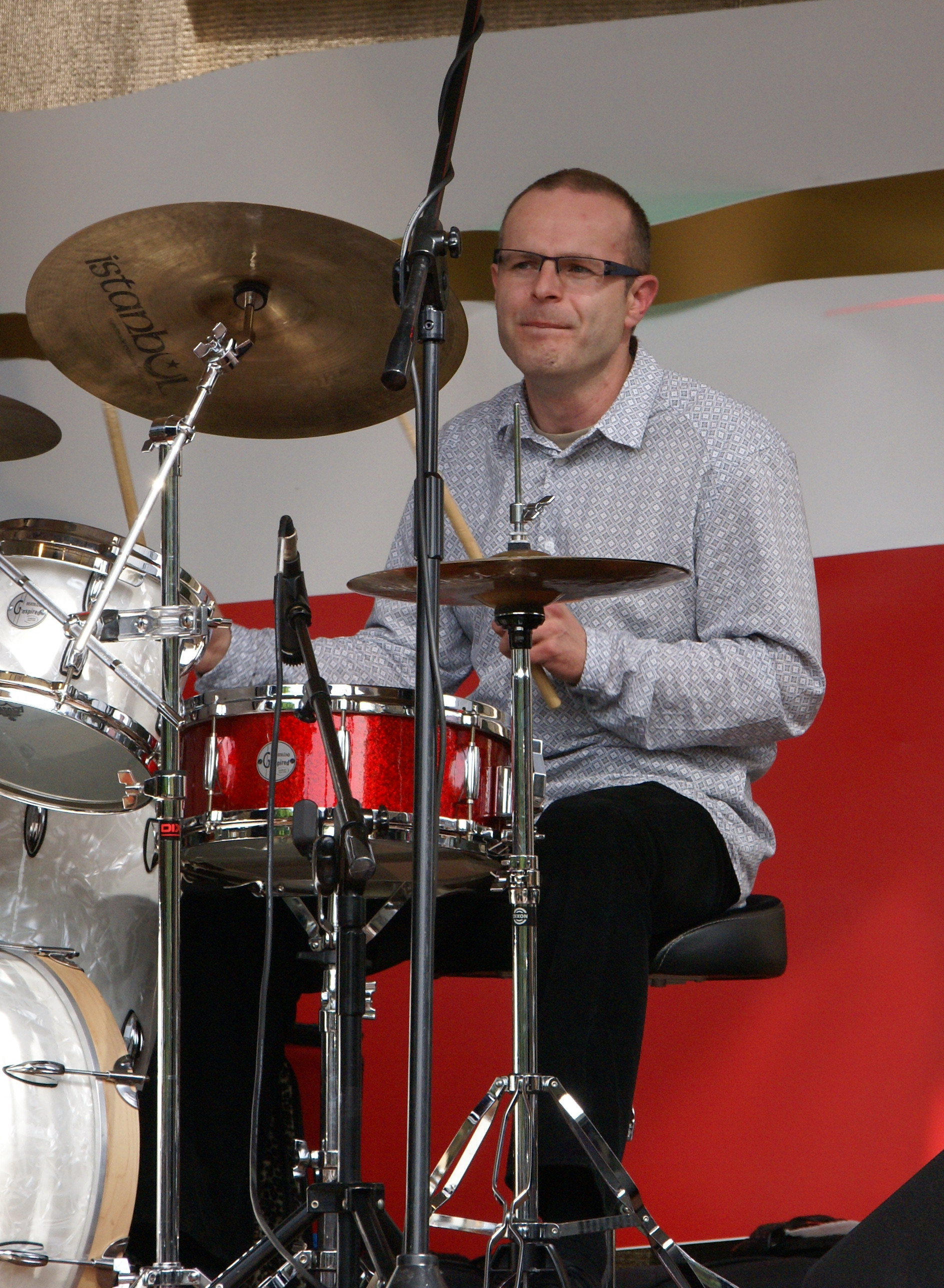
In concert, Bydgoszcz 2010

Marcin Jahr (born March 25, 1969) is a Polish jazz drummer.

== Biography ==
Jahr was born on March 25, 1969, in Bydgoszcz, Poland. He studied drums at The Music Academy in Katowice. He finished his studies in 1992 earning a diploma of jazz music (Department of Jazz and Popular Music). Before that, he had taken part in jazz competitions during Jazz Juniors Festival in Kraków, winning prizes and distinguishing rewards. Since the beginning of his musical career (in 1985) he has taken part in festivals in Poland such as Jazz Jamboree in Warsaw, Jazz on the Odra in Wrocław, Poznań Jazz Fair. He also played on the festivals abroad - Pori Jazz Festival’ 88 with Wiesław Pieregorólka Big Band and Istanbul Festiwal’ 93 with Polish - Turkish Ensemble. Every year (since 1991) he teaches the drums at Jazz Workshop in Puławy in Poland, and also he taught at Jazz Workshop in Leichlingen, Germany (1992, 1994). Marcin Jahr played or cooperated with many Polish and foreign musicians like: trumpeters Tomasz Stańko and Piotr Wojtasik, guitar player Garrison Fewell, saxophonists Jan Ptaszyn Wróblewski, Janusz Muniak, Zbigniew Namysłowski, Adam Wendt, the band "New Presentation" with female vocalist Lora Szafran, vibraphonist Volker Greeve, bassist Ed Schuller and many others.

Marcin Jahr is the member of the band "Funky Groove" (whose CD "Go To Chechua Mountain" was the ‘2003 Best Electric Jazz Recording in "Gitara & Bas Magazine" Reader's Poll. He also performs with various bands of Jacek and Wojciech Niedziela and other great musicians. He can be heard on following CD's: "Wooden Soul" with bassist Jacek Niedziela, "Chopin" with pianist Krzysztof Herdzin and on later recordings (see: selected discography). The CD he recorded with Piotr Wojtasik titled "Lonely Town" and released by Power Bros. was chosen as the Record of the Year 1995 in "Jazz Forum Magazine" Readers Pool. In October 1997 he was a finalist of The First Competition for Jazz Drummers in Grodzisk Mazowiecki, Poland. At present time he cooperates with almost all Polish jazz musicians, first of all with well-known saxophone player Jan Ptaszyn Wróblewski. Between 2004 and 2008 he also taught drums at a jazz department on University of Zielona Góra, Poland and at many jazz clinics.

== Selected discography ==
- Jacek Niedziela — "Wooden Soul (Polonia Records CD 025)
- Piotr Wojtasik — Lonely Town (Power Bros. PB 00137)
- Karol Szymanowski — Sześćsił (Polonia Records CD 060)
- Krzysztof Herdzin — Chopin (Polonia Records CD 056)
- Leszek Kułakowski — Interwały (Polonia Records CD 072)
- The Other Side of Polonia Records (Polonia Records CD 064)
- Jacek Niedziela/Wojciech Niedziela — Jazzowe Poetycje (KOCH Int. 33863-2)
- Funky Groove — Funky Groove (Polygram Polska - Mercury 536 043-2)
- Ewa Bem — Bright Ella's Memorial (KOCH International 33957-2)
- Jan "Ptaszyn" Wróblewski — Henryk Wars Songs - Live in Tarnów (CD Sound Int. CDSCD 103)
- Krzysztof Herdzin — Being Confused (CD Sound Int. CDSCD 106)
- Jacek Niedziela — Sceny z Macondo (CD Sound Int. CDSCD 108)
- Brandon Furman — A Bard's Tale (Polonia Records CD 185)
- Leszek Kułakowski — Katharsis (Not Two Records MW 708-2)
- Wojciech Niedziela — To Kiss the Ivorys (Polonia Records CD 229)
- Leszek Kułakowski — Eurofonia (Not Two Records MW 717-2)
- Wojciech Majewski Grechuta (Sony Jazz) (2001)
- Funky Groove — Go to Chechua Mountain (GRAMI 2002)
- 0-58 — Tryby (0-58records 001)
- Jan "Ptaszyn" Wróblewski Quartet – Real Jazz (BCD CDN 10/PRK CD 0068)
- Bisquit — Inny smak (Kayax)
- Jan "Ptaszyn" Wróblewski Quartet – Supercalifragilistic (BCD CDN 14)
- Kasia Stankowska — Passions (OLPRESS 01)
- Adam Wendt Power Set (Adam Wendt/Boogie Production 5904003980961)
- Adam Wendt Power Set – Big Beat Jazz (2011)
- Magda Piskorczyk – Afro Groove (Artgraff 2011)
- Julia Sawicka Project — Fields of Soul (2012)
- Andrzej Chochół — It's Great Again (Fonografika 2013)
- Jan Ptaszyn Wróblewski Sextet — Moi pierwsi mistrzowie – Komeda / Trzaskowiski / Kurylewicz (2014)
- Julia Sawicka Project – Kolędy (2014)
- Teatr Tworzenia - Katharsis (A Small Victory) (2017)
- Michał Sołtan – Malogranie (2017)
- Jan „Ptaszyn” Wróblewski Sextet – Komeda - Moja słodka europejska ojczyzna, Polish Jazz vol.80 (2018)
- Adam Wendt & Friends – Rhythm & Jazz (2018)
- Teatr Tworzenia – Living After Life (2019)
- Krzysia Górniak – Memories (2020)
- Jacek Niedziela-Meira – Partyturism (2020)
- Jan „Ptaszyn” Wróblewski – Studio Jazzowe PR 1969-1978 (5CD, 2020)
- Bernard Maseli Septet – Good Vibes of Milian (2021)
- Andrzej Dąbrowski & All Stars – Live (2022)
- Buczkowski / Troczewski / Wrombel / Jahr – The Other Sound (2022)
- Nika Lubowicz & All Stars – Nika Sings Ella (2022)
- Jan „Ptaszyn” Wróblewski Quartet – On The Road vol. 1 (2022)
- Krzysia Górniak & Rui Teles – Astrolabe (2022)
