= Józef Skrzek =

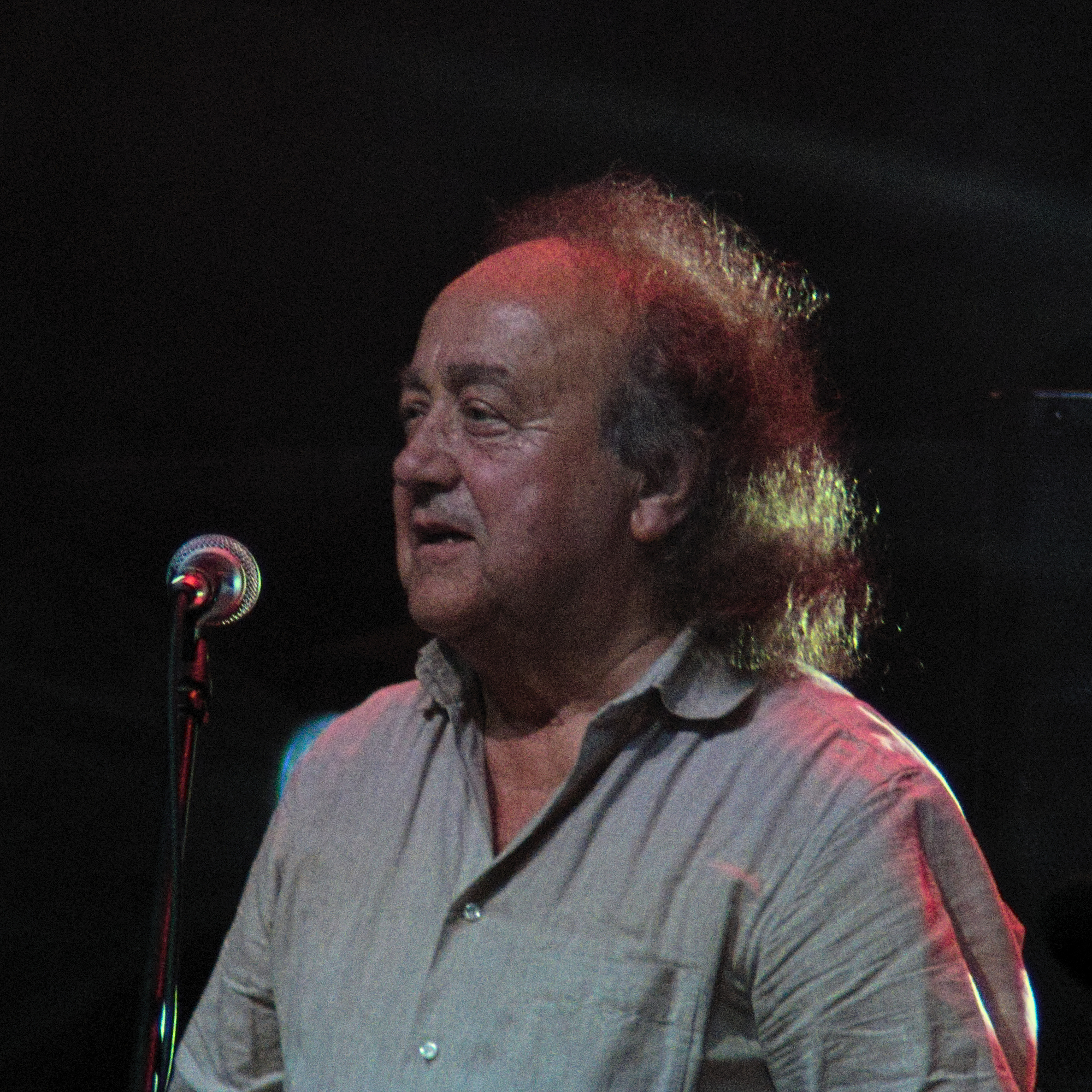
- Skrzek at a concert (2019)

Background information
- Born: 2 July 1948 (age 78); Siemianowice, Poland
- Genres: Contemporary classical, rock
- Occupations: Singer, composer
- Instruments: Vocals, keyboards, bass guitar, harmonica
- Years active: 1971–present
- Member of: SBB
- Website: www.skrzek.com

Józef Franciszek Skrzek (born 2 July 1948, Siemianowice, Silesia, Poland) is a Polish multi-instrumentalist, singer, and composer, an important figure in Polish rock.

== Life ==
In his early career, Skrzek was associated with the groups Ślężanie, Ametysty and Breakout. In 1971, he created the progressive-rock group Silesian Blues Band (with Jerzy Piotrowski and Apostolis Anthimos) and also recorded for a time with Czesław Niemen.

He performed with a number of artist and ad hoc created bands, but mostly involved himself with theater and church music, as well as movie soundtracks. He is well-noted for his live performances not only on conventional concerts but also in a variety of other venues (e.g., his improvisations on summer solstice nights in Silesian Planetarium). Currently, he is a friend of the elementary school in his hometown (elementary school number 13 in Michalkowice) where he often plays or sings.

In 2012 together with Jarosław Pijarowski and his (pl:Teatr Tworzenia) created the first Polish avantgarde oratorio "Terrarium"(pl:Terrarium – Live in Bydgoszcz).

His younger brother, Jan Skrzek, was also a notable Silesian musician.

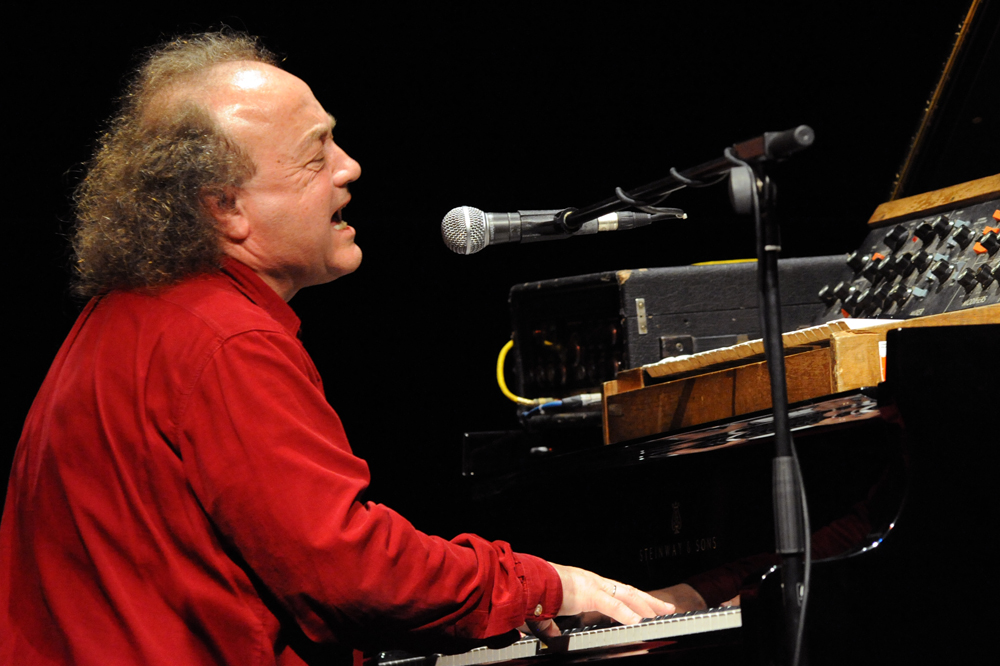
Performing at a benefit concert in Warszawa in November 2010

== Discography ==
- 2020 Sny Powstańców with Krystian Migocz
- 2019 pl:Living After Life with Teatr Tworzenia
- 2018 Miłość (LOVE) - Józef Skrzek & Henryk Jan Bator
- 2017 Maria Kantata (live recording 7.10.2017 in Szt.Istvan Budapest
- 2017 Around The World In Eighty Moogs (concert recordings (2003 - 2009))
- 2017 Stories with Krzysztof Piasecki
- 2017 "(pl:Katharsis (A Small Victory))" with Theatre of Creation (pl:Teatr Tworzenia) by Jarosław Pijarowski (Brain Active Records)
- 2015 "(pl:Requiem dla chwil minionych)" with Jarosław Pijarowski
- 2015 "Tryptyk Bydgoski" - the first part - "Kościół"
- 2014 "The Stratomusica Suite" with Przemysław Mieszko Rudź
- 2014 "(pl:Człowiek z Wysokiego Zamku (album))" with (pl:Wladyslaw Komendarek), Jaroslaw Pijarowski, Jorgos Skolias (Brain Active Records)
- 2013 "(pl:The Dream Off Penderecki)" with Theatre of Creation (pl:Teatr Tworzenia) by Jaroslaw Pijarowski (Brain Active Records)
- 2013 "(pl:Terrarium – Live in Bydgoszcz)" Józef Skrzek & Jaroslaw Pijarowski (Legacy Records) & (Brain Active Records)
- 2013 "(pl:Terrarium – Organ Works)" Józef Skrzek & Jaroslaw Pijarowski (Legacy Records) & (Brain Active Records)
- 2009-09 "Koncert Żywiołów"
- 2009-03 "Czas dojrzewania"
- 2008-05 "Józef Skrzek & Jan Skrzek "Dwa Braty" "
- 2007-03 "La Tempete"
- 2007 - "(pl:Viator 1973-2007)"
- 2007-11 "Tryptyk petersburski" (as guest with Roksana Wikaliuk, Misha Ogorodov, Sasza Ragazanov, Michał Gierjo)
- 2006-07 "Maria z Magdali"
- 2005-05 "Viator - Znak Pokoju"
- 2005 "Planetarium" with Colin Bass
- 2004-11 "Anthology 1974-2004" (SBB)
- 2004-05 "Szczęśliwi z miasta N." (SBB)
- 2003-11 "U stóp krzyża"
- 2003-05 "Akustycznie"
- 2003-05 "Kantata Maryjna"
- 2003-05 "Epitafium Dusz - Koncert na cześć zaginionych..."
- 2002-06 "Koncert Świętokrzyski"
- 2001 "Jesteś, który jesteś"
- 2001 "Dzwonią dzwoneczki, muzyka gra, a kolęda nadal trwa"
- 1998 "Czas"
- 1998 "Pokój Saren Piano"
- 1998 "Warto żyć dla miłości" (Ks. Stanisław Puchała, Józef Skrzek, Michał Mitko)
- 1997 "Pokój Saren"
- 1997 "Kolędy"
- 1997 "Anioł się zwiastuje"
- 1997 "Kantata Maryjna - Live"
- 1993 "Twój dom wschodzącego słońca"
- 1993 "Piosenki ojca Aime Duvala" (Ks. Stanisław Puchała, Józef Skrzek, Michał Mitko)
- 1990-10 "Wracam"
- 1990 "Kolędowy czas" (Kiepurki and Józef Skrzek)
- 1989 "(pl:Live (album Józefa Skrzeka))"
- 1987 "Kantata Maryjna"
- 1985 "Podróż w krainę wyobraźni"
- 1983 "Ambitus Extended"
- 1981 "(pl:Józefina (album))"
- 1981 "Ogród Luizy" (with Halina Frąckowiak)
- 1980 "Ojciec chrzestny Dominika"
- 1979 "Pamiętnik Karoliny"
- 1977 "Swing & Blues" (with Krzysztof Sadowski)

== See also ==
- List of noteworthy Polish people
