= Apostolis Anthimos =

Polish musician (born 1954)

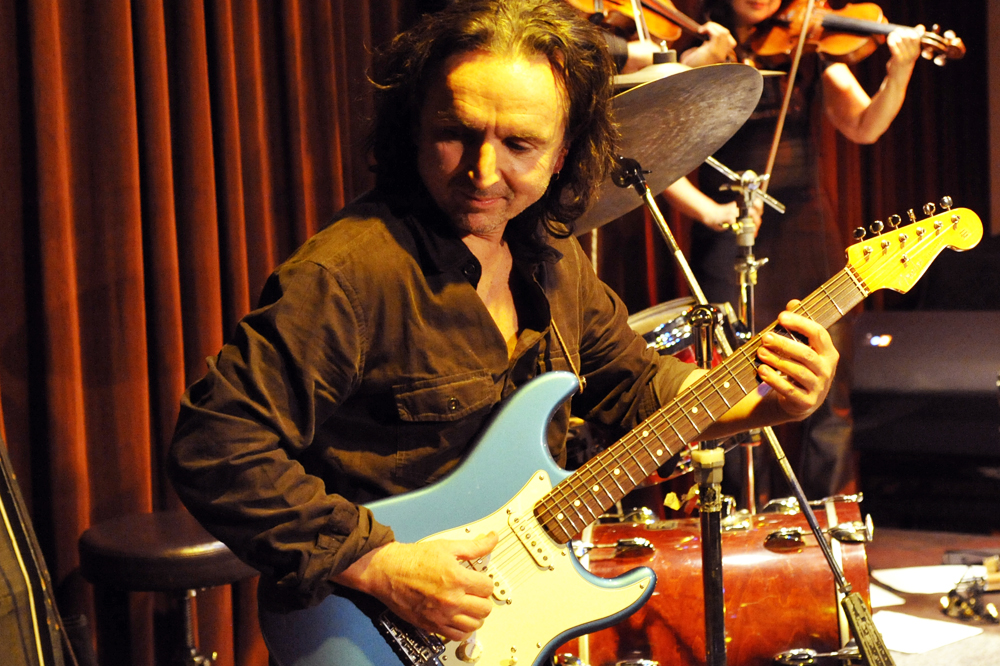
- Anthimos performing in Warsaw with The Greek Freaks ensemble, November 2010

Background information
- Born: 25 September 1954 (age 71)
- Origin: Siemianowice Śląskie, Stalinogród Voivodeship, Polish People's Republic
- Genres: Jazz, Rock
- Instruments: Guitar, Drums, Keyboards
- Label: Metal Mind Productions
- Website: apostolis.pl

Apostolis Anthimos (born 25 September 1954 in Siemianowice Śląskie) is a Polish jazz / rock oriented guitarist, drummer and keyboard player. His parents are Greeks. He is a member of the Polish progressive rock band SBB, and has had a long individual career both as band leader and as sideman. He worked with Czesław Niemen, Tomasz Stańko, George Dalaras, Vangelis Katsoulis, and also a number of bands, including Dżem and Osjan.

He has participated in the recording of over fifty albums, including three solo albums of his own: Days We Can't Forget (1994, backed by Gil Goldstein, Jim Beard, Matthew Garrison & Paul Wertico), Theatro (1999) and Back to the North (2006, backed by Wertico and Marcin Pospieszalski).

His recent solo projects include:

- Apostolis Anthimos Trio (with Krzysztof Dziedzic on drums and Robert Szewczuga on bass guitar)
- Apostolis Anthimos Quartet (with Arild Andersen on double bass, Tomasz Szukalski on saxophone and Krzysztof Dziedzic on drums)
