= List of Mellotron recordings =

This is a list of recordings that feature the sound of a Mellotron, a polyphonic tape-replay keyboard developed in the 1960s.

== 1–9 ==
Song	Artist	Album	Year	Player	Model played
2000 Light Years from Home	The Rolling Stones	Their Satanic Majesties Request	1967	Brian Jones	MkII

== A ==
Song	Artist	Album	Year	Player	Model played
Ace of Wands	Steve Hackett	Voyage of the Acolyte	1975	Steve Hackett or John Acock	M400
Airbag	Radiohead	OK Computer	1997	Jonny Greenwood	M400
And You and I	Yes	Close to the Edge	1972	Rick Wakeman	M400
Angel	Aerosmith	Permanent Vacation	1987	Drew Arnott	M400
Assault and Battery/The Golden Void	Hawkwind	Warrior on the Edge of Time	1975	Simon House	M400
Atom Heart Mother	Pink Floyd	Atom Heart Mother	1970	Richard Wright	MkII

== B ==
Song	Artist	Album	Year	Player	Model played
Baby Can It Be True	The Graham Bond Organisation	There's A Bond Between Us	1965	Graham Bond	MkI
Being for the Benefit of Mr. Kite!	The Beatles	Sgt. Pepper's Lonely Hearts Club Band	1967	George Martin	MkII
Bird of Prey	Uriah Heep	Salisbury	1970	Ken Hensley	M400
Bittersweet Me	R.E.M.	New Adventures in Hi-Fi	1996	Mike Mills	?
Blackberry Way	The Move	single	1968	Richard Tandy	MkII
Blood on the Rooftops	Genesis	Wind and Wuthering	1976	Tony Banks	M400
Broadway Melody of 1974	Genesis	The Lamb Lies Down on Broadway	1974	Tony Banks	M400

== C ==
Song	Artist	Album	Year	Player	Model played
Calling Occupants of Interplanetary Craft	Klaatu	3:47 EST	1976	Dee Long	M400
Can-Utility and the Coastliners	Genesis	Foxtrot	1972	Tony Banks	MkII
Can’t Stand It	wilco	summerteeth	1999	Jay Farrar	M400
Catherine Howard	Rick Wakeman	The Six Wives of Henry VIII	1973	Rick Wakeman	M400-D
The Chamber of 32 Doors	Genesis	The Lamb Lies Down on Broadway	1974	Tony Banks	M400
Champagne Supernova	Oasis	(What's The Story) Morning Glory?	1995	Owen Morris	?
Changes	Black Sabbath	Vol. 4	1972	Tony Iommi	MkII
Cherokee Lane	Tangerine Dream	Encore	1977	Edgar Froese, Chris Franke, Peter Baumann	Twin Keyboard Mellotron Mark V, Mellotron M.400
Chłodna ironia przemijających pejzaży	Czesław Niemen	Idée Fixe	1978	Czesław Niemen	M400
The Cinema Show/Aisle of Plenty	Genesis	Selling England by the Pound	1973	Tony Banks	M400
Cirkus	King Crimson	Lizard	1970	Robert Fripp	MkII
Clocks – The Angel of Mons	Steve Hackett	Spectral Mornings	1979	Nick Magnus	M400
Close To The Edge	Yes	Close to the Edge	1972	Rick Wakeman	M400
The Continuing Story of Bungalow Bill	The Beatles	The Beatles (White Album)	1968	John Lennon; Chris Thomas	MkII
The Court of the Crimson King	King Crimson	In the Court of the Crimson King	1969	Ian McDonald	MkII
Credo	Czesław Niemen	Idée Fixe	1978	Czesław Niemen	M400
Cryptorchid	Marilyn Manson	Antichrist Superstar	1996	Trent Reznor	M400
Cztery ściany świata	Czesław Niemen	Niemen Aerolit	1975	Czesław Niemen	M400

== D ==
Song	Artist	Album	Year	Player	Model played
Daj mi wstążkę błękitną	Czesław Niemen	Niemen Aerolit	1975	Czesław Niemen	M400
Dancing with the Moonlit Knight	Genesis	Selling England by the Pound	1972	Tony Banks	M400
Daniel	Elton John	Don't Shoot Me I'm Only the Piano Player	1973	Elton John	M400
Dirty Little Girl	Elton John	Goodbye Yellow Brick Road	1973	Elton John	?
Don't Look Back in Anger	Oasis	(What's the Story) Morning Glory?	1994	Noel Gallagher	MkII, M400
The Downward Spiral	Nine Inch Nails	The Downward Spiral	1995	Trent Reznor	M400
Dream On	Aerosmith	Aerosmith	1973	Steven Tyler	M400

== E ==
Song	Artist	Album	Year	Player	Model played
E-Bow the Letter	R.E.M.	New Adventures in Hi-Fi	1996	Mike Mills	?
È Festa	Premiata Forneria Marconi	Storia di un minuto	1972	Flavio Premoli	MkII
Easy Money	King Crimson	Larks' Tongues in Aspic	1972	David Cross	M400
Eleventh Earl of Mar	Genesis	Wind and Wuthering	1976	Tony Banks	M400
Entangled	Genesis	A Trick of the Tail	1976	Tony Banks	M400
Epitafium (pamięci Piotra)	Czesław Niemen	Katharsis	1976	Czesław Niemen	M400
Epitaph	King Crimson	In The Court Of The Crimson King	1969	Ian McDonald	MkII
Epsilon in Malaysian Pale	Edgar Froese	Epsilon in Malaysian Pale	1975	Edgar Froese	M400, MkV
Era of the Slaves	Edgar Froese	Ages	1978	Edgar Froese	M400, MkV
Every Day	Steve Hackett	Spectral Mornings	1979	Nick Magnus	M400
Exit Music (For a Film)	Radiohead	OK Computer	1997	Jonny Greenwood	M400

== F ==
Song	Artist	Album	Year	Player	Model played
Fallen Angel	King Crimson	Red	1974	Robert Fripp	M400
Fatum	Czesław Niemen	Katharsis	1976	Czesław Niemen	M400
Firth of Fifth	Genesis	Selling England by the Pound	1973	Tony Banks	M400
The Fountain of Salmacis	Genesis	Nursery Cryme	1971	Tony Banks	MkII
Free Bird	Lynyrd Skynyrd	(Pronounced 'Lĕh-'nérd 'Skin-'nérd)	1973	Al Kooper	M400

== G ==
Song	Artist	Album	Year	Player	Model played
The Gates of Delirium	Yes	Relayer	1974	Patrick Moraz	M400
Geeareohdoubleyou G.R.O.W.	Tripping Daisy	Jesus Hits Like the Atom Bomb	1998	Wes Berggren	M400
Go Let It Out	Oasis	Standing on the Shoulder of Giants	2000	Noel Gallagher	M400, MkII
Golf Girl	Caravan	In the Land of Grey and Pink	1971	Dave Sinclair	MkII
The Greatest	Lana Del Rey	Norman Fucking Rockwell!	2019	Jack Antonoff	M4000D
Grey Seal	Elton John	Goodbye Yellow Brick Road	1973	Elton John	?

== H ==
Song	Artist	Album	Year	Player	Model played
Hammer in the Sand	Steve Hackett	Defector	1980	Nick Magnus	M400
Hands of the Priestess (Parts 1 & 2)	Steve Hackett	Voyage of the Acolyte	1975	Steve Hackett or John Acock	M400
Heart of the Sunrise	Yes	Fragile	1971	Rick Wakeman	M400
Here Comes the Supernatural Anaesthetist	Genesis	The Lamb Lies Down on Broadway	1974	Tony Banks	M400

== I ==
Song	Artist	Album	Year	Player	Model played
I Had Too Much To Dream (Last Night)	Todd Tamanend Clark	We're Not Safe	1979	Charlie Godart	M400
In Another Land	The Rolling Stones	Their Satanic Majesties Request	1967	Brian Jones	MkII
In My Time of Need	Opeth	Damnation	2003	Steven Wilson	?
In The Wake Of Poseidon	King Crimson	In the Wake of Poseidon	1970	Robert Fripp	MkII
Inside I'm Dying	Czesław Niemen	Mourner's Rhapsody	1974	Czesław Niemen	M400
I've Got No One Who Needs Me	Czesław Niemen	Mourner's Rhapsody	1974	Czesław Niemen	M400
Island Girl	Elton John	Rock of the Westies	1975	James Newton Howard	M400
Islands	King Crimson	Islands	1971	Robert Fripp	MkII

== J ==
Song	Artist	Album	Year	Player	Model played
Jacuzzi	Steve Hackett	Defector	1980	Nick Magnus	M400
Julia Dream	Pink Floyd	Relics	1971	Richard Wright	MkII

== K ==
Song	Artist	Album	Year	Player	Model played
Kamyk	Czesław Niemen	Niemen Aerolit	1975	Czesław Niemen	M400
Kashmir	Led Zeppelin	Physical Graffiti	1975	John Paul Jones	M400
Kiss	Korn	Untitled Korn album	2007	Zac Baird	?
Kites	Simon Dupree and the Big Sound	Single	1967		MkII

== L ==
Song	Artist	Album	Year	Player	Model played
Lady in Black	Uriah Heep	Salisbury	1970	Ken Hensley	M400
Ladytron	Roxy Music	Roxy Music	1972	Brian Eno	M400
The Lamia	Genesis	The Lamb Lies Down on Broadway	1974	Tony Banks	M400
Lament	King Crimson	Starless and Bible Black	1974	David Cross	M400
The Lantern	The Rolling Stones	Their Satanic Majesties Request	1967	Brian Jones	MkII
Laur dojrzały	Czesław Niemen	Idée Fixe	1978	Czesław Niemen	M400
Legenda scytyjska	Czesław Niemen	Idée Fixe	1978	Czesław Niemen	M400
Let There Be Love	Oasis	Don't Believe the Truth	2005	Paul Stacey	?
Lilywhite Lilith	Genesis	The Lamb Lies Down on Broadway	1974	Tony Banks	M400
The Line	Foo Fighters	Concrete and Gold	2017	Rami Jaffee	?
Lizard	King Crimson	Lizard	1970	Robert Fripp	MkII
Los Endos	Genesis	A Trick of the Tail	1976	Tony Banks	M400
Lucky	Radiohead	OK Computer	1997	Jonny Greenwood	M400

== M ==
Song	Artist	Album	Year	Player	Model played
Mad Man Moon	Genesis	A Trick of the Tail	1976	Tony Banks	M400
Made-Up Dreams	Built to Spill	Perfect From Now On	1997	Robert Roth	?
Maid of Orleans (The Waltz Joan of Arc)	Orchestral Manoeuvres in the Dark	Architecture & Morality	1982	Andy McCluskey	M400
Many Too Many	Genesis	...And Then There Were Three...	1978	Tony Banks	M400
Marigold	Foo Fighters	Skin and Bones	2006	Rami Jaffee	?
Maroubra Bay	Edgar Froese	Epsilon in Malaysian Pale	1975	Edgar Froese	M400, MkV
Mellon Collie and the Infinite Sadness	The Smashing Pumpkins	Mellon Collie and the Infinite Sadness	1995	Billy Corgan	M400
Memories	Earth and Fire	Songs of the Marching Children	1972	Gerard Koerts	M300
Milk	Garbage	Garbage	1995	Duke Erikson	?
Moonchild	King Crimson	In The Court Of The Crimson King	1969	Ian McDonald	MkII
Muscle Museum	Muse	Showbiz	1999	Matt Bellamy	?
Mysterious Semblance at the Strand of Nightmares	Tangerine Dream	Phaedra	1973	Edgar and Monique Froese	M400

== N ==
Song	Artist	Album	Year	Player	Model played
Nights in White Satin	Moody Blues	Days of Future Passed	1967	Mike Pinder	MkII
Nikes	Frank Ocean	Blonde	2016	Malay	M400
Nine Feet Underground	Caravan	In the Land of Grey and Pink	1971	Dave Sinclair	MkII

== O ==
Song	Artist	Album	Year	Player	Model played
One for the Vine	Genesis	Wind and Wuthering	1976	Tony Banks	M400
Outside	Foo Fighters	Sonic Highways	2014	Rami Jaffee	?

== P ==
Song	Artist	Album	Year	Player	Model played
Paranoid Android	Radiohead	OK Computer	1997	Jonny Greenwood	M400
Phaedra	Tangerine Dream	Phaedra	1973	Edgar Froese	M400
Pizarro and Atahuallpa	Edgar Froese	Ages	1978	Edgar Froese	M400, MkV
Planeta Ziemia	Czesław Niemen	Katharsis	1976	Czesław Niemen	M400
Please Don't Touch	Steve Hackett	Please Don't Touch!	1978	Steve Hackett or John Acock	M400
Proroctwo Wernyhory	Czesław Niemen	Idée Fixe	1978	Czesław Niemen	M400

== Q ==
Song	Artist	Album	Year	Player	Model played
Question	The Moody Blues	A Question of Balance	1970	Mike Pinder	MkII

== R ==
Song	Artist	Album	Year	Player	Model played
The Rain Song	Led Zeppelin	Houses of the Holy	1973	John Paul Jones	M400
The Red Flower of Tachai Blooms Everywhere	Steve Hackett	Spectral Mornings	1979	Nick Magnus	M400
Ride My See-Saw	The Moody Blues	In Search of the Lost Chord	1968	Mike Pinder	MkII
Robbery, Assault and Battery	Genesis	A Trick of the Tail	1976	Tony Banks	M400
Roundabout	Yes	Fragile	1971	Rick Wakeman	M400
Rubycon (Parts 1 and 2)	Tangerine Dream	Rubycon	1975	Edgar Froese	M400
Run	Foo Fighters	Concrete and Gold	2017	Rami Jaffee	?

== S ==
Song	Artist	Album	Year	Player	Model played
Satelliet S.U.Z.Y.	Noordkaap	Programma '96	1996		?
A Saucerful of Secrets	Pink Floyd	A Saucerful of Secrets	1968	Richard Wright	MkII
See Saw	Pink Floyd	A Saucerful of Secrets	1968	Richard Wright	MkII
Seems Uncertain	311	Evolver	2003	Nick Hexum	?
Semi-Detached, Suburban Mr. James	Manfred Mann	The Mighty Quinn	1966	Geoff Stephens, John Carter	MkII
Seven Stones	Genesis	Nursery Cryme	1971	Tony Banks	MkII
Shadow of the Hierophant	Steve Hackett	Voyage of the Acolyte	1975	Steve Hackett	M400
She's a Rainbow	Rolling Stones	Their Satanic Majesties Request	1967	Brian Jones	MkII
Siberian Khatru	Yes	Close to the Edge	1972	Rick Wakeman	M400
Sieroctwo	Czesław Niemen	Idée Fixe	2003 reissue	Czesław Niemen	M400
Silent Sorrow in Empty Boats	Genesis	The Lamb Lies Down on Broadway	1974	Tony Banks	M400
Singing a Song in the Morning	Kevin Ayers	Single	1970	Dave Sinclair	MkII
Slogans	Steve Hackett	Defector	1980	Nick Magnus	M400
Snow (Hey Oh)	Red Hot Chili Peppers	Stadium Arcadium	2006	John Frusciante	?
Something from Nothing	Foo Fighters	Sonic Highways	2014	Rami Jaffee	?
Space Oddity	David Bowie	Space Oddity	1969	Rick Wakeman	MkII
Spectral Mornings	Steve Hackett	Spectral Mornings	1979	Nick Magnus	M400
Starless	King Crimson	Red	1974	Robert Fripp	M400
The Story in Your Eyes	The Moody Blues	Every Good Boy Deserves Favour	1971	Mike Pinder	MkII (Customized)
Strawberry Fields Forever	The Beatles	Magical Mystery Tour	1967	George Harrison; John Lennon; Paul McCartney	MkII
The Steppes	Steve Hackett	Defector	1980	Nick Magnus	M400
Straceńcy	Czesław Niemen	Idée Fixe	1978	Czesław Niemen	M400
Supper's Ready	Genesis	Foxtrot	1972	Tony Banks	MkII

== T ==
Song	Artist	Album	Year	Player	Model played
Tears	Rush	2112	1976	Hugh Syme	M400
Theme for an Imaginary Western	Mountain (band)	Climbing!	1970	Steve Knight	M400
This Song Has No Title	Elton John	Goodbye Yellow Brick Road	1973	Elton John	?
Tigermoth	Steve Hackett	Spectral Mornings	1979	Nick Magnus	M400
The Toast	Steve Hackett	Defector	1980	Nick Magnus	M400
Tomorrow Never Knows	The Beatles	Revolver	1966	John Lennon	MkII
Too Sweet	Hozier	Single	2024	Daniel Tannenbaum	?
A Tower Struck Down	Steve Hackett	Voyage of the Acolyte	1975	Steve Hackett or John Acock	M400
Trio	King Crimson	Starless and Bible Black	1974	Robert Fripp	M400
Turn the Page	Bob Seger	Back in '72; Live Bullet	1972; 1976	Alto Reed	M400
Tuesday Afternoon	The Moody Blues	Days of Future Passed	1967	Mike Pinder	MkII
Tuesday's Gone	Lynyrd Skynyrd	(Pronounced 'Lĕh-'nérd 'Skin-'nérd)	1973	Al Kooper	M400
Twarzą do słońca	Czesław Niemen	Idée Fixe	1978	Czesław Niemen	M400

== U ==
Song	Artist	Album	Year	Player	Model played
Unintended	Muse	Showbiz	1999	Matt Bellamy	?
Untrustable / Part 2 (About Someone Else)	Built to Spill	Perfect From Now On	1997	Robert Roth	?

== V ==
Song	Artist	Album	Year	Player	Model played
Velvet Waltz	Built to Spill	Perfect From Now On	1997	Robert Roth	?

== W ==
Song	Artist	Album	Year	Player	Model played
W obozie ukraińskim	Czesław Niemen	Idée Fixe	1978	Czesław Niemen	M400
Watcher of the Skies	Genesis	Foxtrot	1972	Tony Banks	MkII
We Run	Strange Advance	2WO	1985	Drew Arnott	M400
What Did I Do? / God as My Witness	Foo Fighters	Sonic Highways	2014	Rami Jaffee	?
The Witch's Promise	Jethro Tull	Single	1970	John Evan	MkII
Wonderwall	Oasis	(What's the Story) Morning Glory?	1995	Paul "Bonehead" Arthurs	M400
The World at Large	Modest Mouse	Good News for People Who Love Bad News	2004	Dann Gallucci	

== Z ==
Song	Artist	Album	Year	Player	Model played
Zazdrość Semenki	Czesław Niemen	Idée Fixe	1978	Czesław Niemen	M400
