= Stuntman (Edgar Froese album) =

Studio album by Edgar Froese
- Released: September 1979, April 2005 (reissue)
- Recorded: Summer 1979
- Studio: Amber Studio, Berlin
- Genre: Electronic
- Length: 43:52
- Label: Virgin
- Producer: Edgar Froese

Edgar Froese chronology
Ages (1978)	Stuntman (1979)	Kamikaze 1989 (1982)

Professional ratings
Review scores
Source	Rating
Allmusic	4/5 stars

Stuntman is the fifth solo album released by Tangerine Dream leader Edgar Froese, in 1979.

Froese later remixed the album and released it with a new cover.

The album utilizes much the same instruments and equipment heard on Froese's previous albums; electric guitar, Moog Synthesizer (including sequencer), Mellotron, PPG 340/360, and other keyboards. On this release there are six tracks (originally three to each side of an LP) instead of two side-long tracks as found on, for example, his album Epsilon in Malaysian Pale (1975).

== Track listing ==
All tracks written, performed and produced by Edgar Froese

No.	Title	Length
1.	"Stuntman"	4:13
2.	"It Would Be Like Samoa"	10:40
3.	"Detroit Snackbar Dreamer"	6:26
4.	"Drunken Mozart in the Desert"	9:53
5.	"A Dali-Esque Sleep Fuse"	8:26
6.	"Scarlet Score For Mescalero"	4:14
