= In Another Land =

Single by Bill Wyman

from the album Their Satanic Majesties Request
- B-side: "The Lantern"
- Released: 2 December 1967
- Recorded: June/September 1967
- Studio: Olympic, London
- Genre: Psychedelic rock
- Length: 2:48
- Label: London
- Songwriter: Bill Wyman
- Producer: The Rolling Stones

Bill Wyman US singles chronology
| "In Another Land" (1967) | "White Lightnin'" (1974) |

The Rolling Stones US singles chronology
| "Dandelion" (1967) | "In Another Land" (1967) | "She's a Rainbow" (1967) |

Their Satanic Majesties Request track listing
- 10 tracks Side one: 1. "Sing This All Together"; 2. "Citadel"; 3. "In Another Land"; 4. "2000 Man"; 5. "Sing This All Together (See What Happens)"; Side two: 6. "She's a Rainbow"; 7. "The Lantern"; 8. "Gomper"; 9. "2000 Light Years from Home"; 10. "On with the Show"

"In Another Land" is a song by the English rock band the Rolling Stones, released in December 1967 as the first single from their sixth studio album Their Satanic Majesties Request, and credited solely to Bill Wyman. In America, London Records released it as a single a week before the album.

Written by bassist Bill Wyman, "In Another Land" is the only Rolling Stones song to feature Wyman on lead vocals, and one of only three Rolling Stones songs he wrote (the others being "Downtown Suzie" and the unreleased "Goodbye Girl"). The single was released on 2 December 1967, credited to Bill Wyman, with the Stones' "The Lantern" as the B-side. It peaked at No. 87 on the US Billboard Hot 100 singles chart and at No. 62 on the Cash Box Top 100 singles chart, on which it was credited to Bill Wyman.

== Background ==
The song was recorded on a night when Wyman had shown up at the studio and found that the session had been cancelled. Feeling frustrated that he had potentially wasted time in driving there, engineer Glyn Johns asked him if he had anything that he'd like to record. "I'd been messing with this song. It was a bit ... what I thought was kind of spacy, you know ... a bit kind of Satanic Majesties-like. And psychedelic in a way."

Lyrically, Wyman stated that "The idea for the song is about this guy who wakes up from a dream and finds himself in another dream." The song describes events that transpire in a dreamlike state:

We walked across the sand
And the sea and the sky and the castles were blue
I stood and held your hand
And the spray flew high and the feathers floated by
I stood and held your hand

Johns showed the song to Mick Jagger, Keith Richards, and Brian Jones, who all liked it and decided to include it on the record.

The musicians on the song are Wyman on lead vocals, with both Ronnie Lane and Steve Marriott of the Small Faces on guitar and backing vocals, Nicky Hopkins on keyboards, Charlie Watts on drums, and Jagger adding backing vocals.

At the conclusion of the track as heard on the album, Wyman himself can be heard snoring. He was unaware this had been tagged onto his song until he first played the completed album. He learned later that one night when he had fallen asleep in the studio, Jagger and Richards miked him up and recorded him snoring, and stuck it onto his track as a joke. This does not appear on the single.

== Critical reception ==
Billboard described the single as an "off-beat piece of rock ballad material that should prove a monster" and as "a weirdy that can't miss". Cash Box said that the song enters the "electrical-kaleidoscopic realm" and incorporates "vocal reverb, use of thudding rhythmics and a good melody".

== Personnel ==
The Rolling Stones

- Bill Wyman – lead vocals, bass guitar, Hammond organ, snoring
- Mick Jagger – backing vocals
- Keith Richards – acoustic guitar, backing vocals
- Brian Jones – Mellotron, sound effects
- Charlie Watts – drums

Additional musicians

- Nicky Hopkins – piano, harpsichord
- Ian Stewart – organ
- Ronnie Lane – backing vocals
- Steve Marriott – 12-string acoustic guitar, backing vocals
