= Their Satanic Majesties Request =

Studio album by the Rolling Stones
- Released: 8 December 1967
- Recorded: 9 February – 23 October 1967
- Studios: Olympic, London
- Genres: Psychedelic pop; acid rock; experimental rock; psychedelic rock
- Length: 44:03
- Label: Decca
- Producer: The Rolling Stones

The Rolling Stones UK chronology
Between the Buttons (1967)	Their Satanic Majesties Request (1967)	Beggars Banquet (1968)

The Rolling Stones US chronology
Flowers (1967)	Their Satanic Majesties Request (1967)	Beggars Banquet (1968)

Singles from Their Satanic Majesties Request
- 1. "In Another Land" / "The Lantern" Released: 2 December 1967; 2. "She's a Rainbow" / "2000 Light Years from Home" Released: 23 December 1967

Their Satanic Majesties Request is the sixth studio album by the English rock band the Rolling Stones, released in December 1967 by Decca Records in the UK and by London Records in the United States. It was the first Rolling Stones album released in identical versions in both countries. The title is a play on the "Her Britannic Majesty requests and requires" text that appeared inside a British passport.

The band experimented with a psychedelic sound, incorporating unconventional elements such as Mellotron, sound effects, string arrangements, and African rhythms. Its lyrics draw on dreamlike imagery and science-fiction themes, with subjects including the loss of individual identity in a futuristic society, space travel, distance, loneliness, and alienation. The band members produced the album themselves as their manager/producer Andrew Loog Oldham had departed. The prolonged recording process was marked by drug use, court appearances, and jail terms by members of the band. The original LP cover features a lenticular image by the photographer Michael Cooper. Following the release, the Rolling Stones abandoned their psychedelic style for a stripped-down return to their roots in blues music.

The album initially received mixed reviews. It was criticised as being derivative of the contemporaneous work of the Beatles, particularly their May 1967 release Sgt. Pepper's Lonely Hearts Club Band, with the similarities extending to the LP's cover. In subsequent decades, however, the album's reception has been more favorable.

== Recording ==
Recording of Their Satanic Majesties Request began just after the release of Between the Buttons on 20 January 1967. Because of court appearances and jail terms, the entire band was seldom present in the studio at one time, making recording of the album lengthy and disjointed. Band members frequently arrived with guests in tow, further interfering with productivity. One of the more level-headed members of the band during this time, Bill Wyman, wary of psychedelic drugs, wrote the song "In Another Land" to parody the Stones' current goings-on. In his 2002 book Rolling with the Stones, Wyman describes the situations in the studio:

Every day at the studio it was a lottery as to who would turn up and what – if any – positive contribution they would make when they did. Keith would arrive with anywhere up to ten people, Brian with another half-a-dozen and it was the same for Mick. They were assorted girlfriends and friends. I hated it! Then again, so did Andrew (Oldham) and just gave up on it. There were times when I wish I could have done, too.

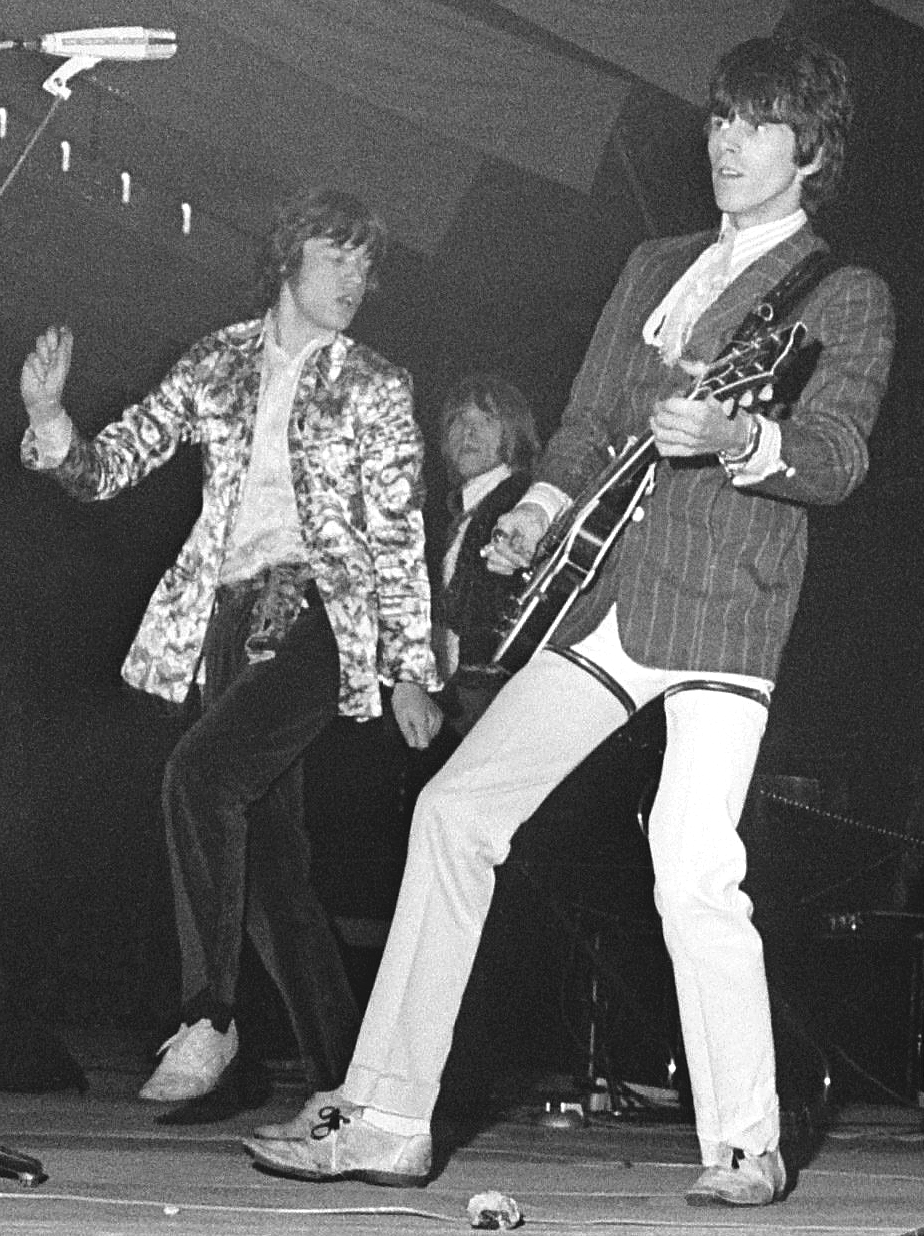
Mick Jagger (left), Brian Jones (back, center) and Keith Richards (right) in April 1967

The Stones experimented with many new instruments and sound effects during the sessions, including Mellotron, theremin, short wave radio static, and string arrangements by then-future Led Zeppelin bassist John Paul Jones. Their producer and manager Andrew Loog Oldham, already fed up with the band's lack of focus, distanced himself from them following their drug bust and finally quit, leaving them without a producer. As a result, Their Satanic Majesties Request would be the Stones' first self-produced album. Mick Jagger later opined this was not for the best, while expressing disdain for some of the tracks.

In another interview, Brian Jones stated:

It's really like sort of got-together chaos. Because we all panicked a little, even as soon as a month before the release date that we had planned, we really hadn't got anything put together. We had all these great things that we'd done, but we couldn't possibly put it out as an album. And so we just got them together, and did a little bit of editing here and there.

Some of the album's songs were recorded under various working titles, some appearing radically different from the final titles. These working titles include: "Acid in the Grass" ("In Another Land"), "I Want People to Know" ("2000 Man"), "Flowers in Your Bonnet" ("She's a Rainbow"), "Fly My Kite" ("The Lantern"), "Toffee Apple" ("2000 Light Years from Home"), and "Surprise Me" ("On with the Show"). In 1998, a bootleg box set of eight CDs with outtakes from the Satanic sessions was released, and it shows the band developing the songs over multiple takes as well as the experimentation that went into the recording of the album.

== Title and packaging ==
The working title of the album was Cosmic Christmas, or The Rolling Stones' Cosmic Christmas – in the hidden coda titled "Cosmic Christmas" (following "Sing This All Together (See What Happens)"), a slowed-down version of the tune "We Wish You a Merry Christmas" is played on an oscillator. The album was released in South Africa and the Philippines as The Stones Are Rolling because of the word "Satanic" in the title.

One proposed cover, a photograph of Jagger naked on a cross, was scrapped by the record company for being "in bad taste". The initial LP (Note: Duplicated by Ampex for London Records, catalogue no. LPM 70141 and reel-to-reel releases.) of the album featured a three-dimensional picture of the band on the cover by photographer Michael Cooper. When viewed in a certain way, the lenticular image shows the band members' faces turning towards each other, with the exception of Jagger, whose hands appear crossed in front of him. Looking closely at its cover, one can see the faces of each of the four Beatles, reportedly a response to the Beatles' inclusion of a Shirley Temple doll wearing a "Welcome the Rolling Stones" sweater on the cover of Sgt. Pepper. Later editions replaced the glued-on three-dimensional image with a photograph due to high production costs. A limited edition LP version in the 1980s reprinted the original 3D cover design; immediately following the reissue, it was claimed that the master materials for reprinting the 3D cover were intentionally destroyed, implying that faithful recreations of the cover would no longer be possible, but this has since been proven false by numerous re-issues. The lenticular album cover was featured, although shrunk down, for a (Japanese) SHM-CD release in 2008.

The original cover design called for the lenticular image to take up the entire front cover, but finding this to be prohibitively expensive it was decided to reduce the size of the photo and surround it with the blue-and-white graphic design.

The entire cover design is elaborate, with a dense photo collage filling most of the inside cover (along with a maze) designed by Michael Cooper, and a painting by Tony Meeuwissen on the back cover depicting the four elements (Earth, Water, Fire, and Air). In some editions, the blue-and-white wisps on the front cover are used in a red-and-white version on the paper inner sleeve. The inner-cover collage has dozens of images, taken from reproductions of old master paintings (Ingres, Poussin, da Vinci, among others), Indian mandalas and portraits, astronomy (including a large image of the planet Saturn), flowers, world maps, etc. The maze on the inside cover of the UK and US releases cannot be completed: a wall at about a half radius in from the lower left corner means one can never arrive at the goal labelled "It's Here" in the centre of the maze.

It was the first of four Stones albums to feature a novelty cover; the others were the zipper on Sticky Fingers (1971), the cut-out faces on Some Girls (1978), and the stickers on Undercover (1983).

At some point around 1997, rumours were first heard that the album existed as a promo version, including a silk padding. A pink padded version was presented by photo accompanied by a letter from the Decca Copyright Department, but it was shown that the letter does not match the album it was intended to authenticate making it almost entirely certain that this was a forgery.

== Release and reception ==
Released in December 1967, Their Satanic Majesties Request reached No. 3 in the UK and No. 2 in the US (easily going gold), but its commercial performance declined rapidly. It was soon viewed as a pretentious, poorly conceived attempt to outdo the Beatles and Sgt. Pepper's Lonely Hearts Club Band (released in May 1967), often explained by drug trials and excesses in contemporary musical fashion, although John Lennon and Paul McCartney did provide backing vocals (uncredited) on "We Love You" (recorded during the Their Satanic Majesties Request sessions, but released as a single a few months before the album). The Wyman-composed "In Another Land" was released as a single, with the artist credit listed as Bill Wyman, rather than the Rolling Stones (the B-side, "The Lantern", was credited to the Rolling Stones).

The production, in particular, came in for harsh criticism from Jon Landau in the fifth issue of Rolling Stone, and Jimmy Miller (recommended by the album's engineer, Glyn Johns) was asked to produce the Stones' subsequent albums, on which they would return to the hard-driving blues that earned them fame early in their career. In an April 1968 album review, Richard Corliss of the New York Times was also critical of the production value stating "... their imagination seems to have dried up when it comes to some of the arrangements. While still better than their previous ones, the arrangements are often ragged, fashionably monotonous and off-key." Despite this he gave the album an overall positive review, going as far as calling it a better concept album than Of Cabbages and Kings (1967, by Chad & Jeremy), The Beat Goes On (1968, by Vanilla Fudge) and even Sgt. Pepper's Lonely Hearts Club Band (1967, by the Beatles). In a 1970 Rolling Stone interview, Lennon commented on the album: "Satanic Majesties is Pepper. 'We Love You' ... that's 'All You Need Is Love'."

== Legacy and reappraisal ==
Retrospective professional reviews
Review scores
Source	Rating
AllMusic	4/5 stars
Encyclopedia of Popular Music	3/5 stars
Entertainment Weekly	C
The Great Rock Discography	5/10
Louder	4/5 stars
NME	8/10
Pitchfork	7.8/10
Record Collector	4/5 stars
The Rolling Stone Album Guide	4/5 stars
The Village Voice	B+

In the 1979 edition of The Rolling Stone Record Guide, music critic Dave Marsh wrote: "Satanic Majesties is a bad idea gone wrong. The idea of making a truly druggy answer to the cherubic joyousness of the Beatles' Sgt. Pepper was silly enough. Doing so by fuzzing up some pretty good songs with tape loops and early synthesizer experiments is thoroughly unforgivable. Only "2000 Man," "In Another Land" and "She's a Rainbow" redeem this one."

Keith Richards himself has been critical of the album in later years. While he likes some of the songs ("2000 Light Years from Home", "Citadel", and "She's a Rainbow"), he stated, "the album was a load of crap." Mick Jagger disavowed the album in 1995, saying: "it's not very good. It had interesting things on it, but I don't think any of the songs are very good. There's two good songs on it. The rest of them are nonsense." There are only two songs from the album which the Stones performed live, "2000 Light Years from Home" (1989–90 world tour, 2013 Glastonbury Festival), and "She's a Rainbow" (1997–98 Bridges to Babylon Tour and occasionally on concert tours in the late 2010s.)

The album has been reassessed positively by critics. In a retrospective 1977 review, Robert Christgau of the Village Voice stated that the album "no doubt contains several great songs" despite negative reception from some. Stephen Thomas Erlewine of Pitchfork wrote that "Perhaps psychedelia wasn't a natural fit for the earthbound Stones, but the dissonance between their gritty rhythms and ornate, precocious arrangements is enthralling, not in the least because there's no other record—by the Stones or anybody else—that sounds quite like this." AllMusic's Bob Eder called the mono mix of the album a distinct improvement over the stereo version, describing it as transforming the maligned album into "superb, punky psychedelia". Richie Unterberger of AllMusic writes:

Without a doubt, no Rolling Stones album – and, indeed, very few rock albums from any era – split critical opinion as much as the Rolling Stones' psychedelic outing. Many dismiss the record as sub-Sgt. Pepper posturing; others confess, if only in private, to a fascination with the album's inventive arrangements, which incorporated some African rhythms, Mellotrons, and full orchestration. What's clear is that never before or after did the Stones take so many chances in the studio…In 1968, the Stones would go back to the basics, and never wander down these paths again, making this all the more of a fascinating anomaly in the group's discography.

In August 2002, Their Satanic Majesties Request was reissued in a new remastered CD, LP and DSD by ABKCO Records. In 2008, the album was released in SHM-CD for Japan using the same 2002 remaster, and in December of that year it was reissued (also as a SHM-CD Japanese only release) with the original lenticular cover for the first time in that format. In May 2011, the album was reissued on SHM-SACD. In 2017, a set containing two LPs (mono/stereo) as well as two SACDs (mono/stereo) was released, with another new remastering for the stereo version. In 2018, the album was reissued as part of the Record Store Day. The release contained the 2017 remastered stereo version of the album pressed on transparent coloured vinyl (180g) and also featured the 3D-style sleeve.

== Track listing ==
All tracks are written by Mick Jagger and Keith Richards, except "In Another Land" by Bill Wyman.

Side one
No.	Title	Length
1.	"Sing This All Together"	3:46
2.	"Citadel"	2:50
3.	"In Another Land"	3:15
4.	"2000 Man"	3:07
5.	"Sing This All Together (See What Happens)" (hidden track "Cosmic Christmas" starts at 7:54)	8:33
Total length:		21:31

Side two
No.	Title	Length
6.	"She's a Rainbow"	4:35
7.	"The Lantern"	4:24
8.	"Gomper"	5:08
9.	"2000 Light Years from Home"	4:45
10.	"On with the Show"	3:40
Total length:		22:32

== Personnel ==
The Rolling Stones

- Mick Jagger – lead vocals (all but 3), backing vocals (1, 3, 6), glockenspiel (2), percussion (8), maracas (2, 9–10), tambourine (6)
- Keith Richards – electric guitar (all but 3), backing vocals (1, 3, 7–9), acoustic guitar (3–4, 6–7), bass guitar (1–2, 10), fuzz bass (9)
- Brian Jones – Mellotron (1–3, 5–7, 9–10), theremin (5), saxophone (1–2), flute (2, 5), vibraphone and Jew's harp (5), organ (7), electric dulcimer (4, 8–9), recorder (8), backing vocals (1), sound effects (3), harp (10)
- Bill Wyman – bass guitar (3–9), lead vocals and Hammond organ (3), backing vocals (1), snoring (3), oscillator (9)
- Charlie Watts – drums (all but 8), tabla (8), backing vocals (1)

Additional personnel

- Nicky Hopkins – piano (1, 3–4, 6–7, 9–10), organ (4), harpsichord (3, 6), celesta (6)
- John Paul Jones – string arrangement (6)
- Ronnie Lane – backing vocals (3)
- Steve Marriott – backing vocals and 12-string acoustic guitar (3)
- Eddie Kramer – claves (9)
- Unidentified session musicians – string section (6)
- Others, including Marianne Faithfull – probable backing vocals (1)

== Charts ==
Chart (1968)	Peak position
Australian Albums (Kent Music Report)	1
Finland (The Official Finnish Charts)	7
German Albums (Offizielle Top 100)	4
Japanese Albums (Oricon)	99
Norwegian Albums (VG-lista)	2
UK Albums (Official Charts)	3
US Billboard 200	2

Chart (2017)	Peak position
Belgian Albums (Ultratop Flanders)	137
Belgian Albums (Ultratop Wallonia)	189
Dutch Albums (Album Top 100)	84

Chart (2018)	Peak position
Portuguese Albums (AFP)	46

== Certifications ==
Region	Certification	Certified units/sales
United Kingdom (BPI) release of 2006	Silver	60,000^{‡}
United States (RIAA)	Gold	500,000^{^}
^{^} Shipments figures based on certification alone.^{‡} Sales+streaming figures based on certification alone.
