= The Lantern (song) =

Single by the Rolling Stones

from the album Their Satanic Majesties Request
- A-side: "In Another Land"
- Released: 2 December 1967 (US single); 8 December 1967 (UK album)
- Recorded: July & September 1967
- Studio: Olympic, London
- Genre: Psychedelic rock; psychedelic folk
- Length: 4:24
- Label: London (US); Decca (UK)
- Songwriter: Jagger/Richards
- Producer: The Rolling Stones

The Rolling Stones US singles chronology
"Dandelion" (1967)	"The Lantern" (1967)	"She's a Rainbow" (1967)

Their Satanic Majesties Request track listing
- 10 tracks Side one: 1. "Sing This All Together"; 2. "Citadel"; 3. "In Another Land"; 4. "2000 Man"; 5. "Sing This All Together (See What Happens)"; Side two: 6. "She's a Rainbow"; 7. "The Lantern"; 8. "Gomper"; 9. "2000 Light Years from Home"; 10. "On with the Show"

"The Lantern" is a song from the Rolling Stones' 1967 psychedelic rock album Their Satanic Majesties Request. Written by Mick Jagger and Keith Richards, it also appeared as the B-side to the American single "In Another Land".

== Music and lyrics ==
The song opens with chimes, which serve as the mystic symbol of enlightenment. It carries a melody inspired by the blues, with folk influences as well. "The Lantern" also features a horn arrangement. Brian Jones plays the organ in the intro and in the 2:30 mark, though earlier version of the song feature his organ throughout. The lyrics deal with a pair of lovers, one of whom has died though the other still feels love for her. A lantern is a metaphor for what unites the two between life and death, and also the light that would enable him to join her when he dies.

== Release and reception ==
The single was released on 2 December 1967. Jon Landau of Rolling Stone praised the performance of Bill Wyman, Charlie Watts, and Keith Richards on the song, calling Richards's guitar work the best on the album. Landau wrote that "The Lantern" was "another comparatively successful effort in which some excellent instrumental efforts help transcend a rather boring tune and a poor lead vocal." Matthew Greenwald of Allmusic called the song's melody one of the best on the album, compared the lyrics to those of Syd Barrett, and wrote that it was "one of the underappreciated songs from Their Satanic Majesties Request." Philippe Margotin and Jean-Michel Guesdon wrote, in The Rolling Stones All the Songs: The Story Behind Every Track, that "The Lantern" "is a song that deserves to be rediscovered, but it is important to get hold of the mono version, as the stereo version is a catastrophe, mixed by someone with tired ears".

David Marchese of Vulture ranked it the 262nd best Rolling Stones song, calling it "not bad" but thought "expectations are higher for the Rolling Stones." Georgiy Starostin, on the other hand, considered it the best song on the album. He criticized the lyrics but opined, "in comparison to, say, Led Zeppelin's flat-foot, gruff take on mysticism, this one is gentle, exotic and totally non-generic."

== Personnel ==
The Rolling Stones

- Mick Jagger – lead vocals
- Brian Jones – organ, Mellotron
- Keith Richards – acoustic guitar, electric guitar, backing vocals
- Bill Wyman – bass guitar
- Charlie Watts – drums

Additional personnel

- Nicky Hopkins – piano
