= Under Neath What =

UK musical group

- Also known as: Underneath What, U.N.W.
- Origin: Brixton, London, England
- Genres: Alternative rock, psychedelic rock, glam rock, gothic rock
- Years active: 1986/87–1991, mid-2000s
- Labels: One Big Guitar, WEA, Atco/Atlantic, EastWest
- Past members: Andrew "Andy" Berenyi (lead vocals, guitar); Tim Ashton (bass); Mikal C. (drums); Peter Peetoom (drums); Mike Williams (drums)

Under Neath What (frequently stylized or written as Underneath What or U.N.W.) were an Anglo-American alternative rock and psychedelic rock band formed in Brixton, London in the late 1980s. Centered around American singer, guitarist, and primary songwriter Andrew "Andy" Berenyi, the trio developed a following among alternative rock audiences and received UK music press coverage between 1988 and 1990 for their eclectic synthesis of psychedelic rock, glam, hard rock, gothic atmospheres, and funk.

The band achieved chart success on the UK Independent Singles Chart with their early singles "Firebomb Telecom" (No. 15) and "Bad Karma Chameleon" (No. 18) in 1989. Their debut studio album, What Is It?, was produced by David Batchelor and released in 1989 in the UK by WEA and in March 1990 in the United States by Atco/Atlantic. Influential British music critic Simon Reynolds famously praised their "sexy, raunchy, almost new glam rock sound" and attempted to coin the genre term "crotchquake" to describe them.

Under Neath What toured extensively across the UK, mainland Europe, Russia, Japan, and Australasia, appearing on Australian television's Countdown Revolution and broadcasting a live session for Triple J in Sydney. The group disbanded in 1991 following Berenyi's return to the United States, though they briefly re-formed in the mid-2000s. Berenyi passed away in Kansas City, Missouri in October 2018 at the age of 55.

== History ==
=== Formation and early years (1986–1988) ===
Under Neath What was formed in Brixton, South London around 1986 or 1987. The central creative figure was Andrew "Andy" Berenyi (born March 31, 1963, in Huntington, New York), an American vocalist and guitarist who had moved from Missouri to London with the ambition of establishing a rock group. In London, Berenyi recruited English musicians Tim Ashton on bass and drummer Mikal C. (with Peter Peetoom and later Mike Williams also performing drum duties during various stages of the band's career). Rumours in the contemporary music press frequently noted that the group lived together in a South London squat while building their repertoire.

The group's earliest documented recording was the track "Pointed ID", featured on a 1988 7-inch vinyl compilation released by House of Dolls magazine. By late 1988, Under Neath What had built a reputation on the UK touring circuit, securing support slots with established gothic rock and alternative groups including Fields of the Nephilim (including a performance at St George's Hall, Bradford, on September 8, 1988) and Gene Loves Jezebel at the Birmingham Hummingbird.

=== Breakthrough, singles, and What Is It? (1989–1990) ===
In March 1989, the group released their official debut single, "Firebomb Telecom", on the independent label One Big Guitar (distributed via Revolver/The Cartel). The single was heralded by Music Week, which observed that the trio had "caused a ripple and a stir" across London during the preceding year, prompting intense major-label interest. "Firebomb Telecom" peaked at No. 15 on the UK Independent Singles Chart.

Their follow-up single, "Bad Karma Chameleon", released in mid-1989, reinforced their commercial momentum by reaching No. 18 on the UK Independent Singles Chart. A subsequent single, "Get Outta The Way", received acclaim in Record Mirror, where writer Pete Clark described their output as "distinctly moody rock 'n' roll" and advised readers to "keep more than an eye on gorgeous, pouting Under Neath What."

Following a major-label bidding war, Under Neath What signed with WEA in the UK and Atco/Atlantic in the United States. In late 1989, they released their debut studio album, What Is It?. Co-produced by David Batchelor alongside the band and mixed by Paul Lani, the 12-track album showcased the group's eclectic sonic palette, ranging from hard rock and funk-inflected grooves to psychedelic balladry and a cover of The Rolling Stones' "2000 Light Years from Home". The album was released in the US in March 1990 (Atco LP/Cassette cat. no. 91357).

=== International tours and media exposure (1989–1990) ===
Between 1989 and 1990, Under Neath What embarked on extensive international tours across Western Europe, Russia, Japan, Australia, and New Zealand. In Australia and New Zealand, the band achieved a notable media presence. The band's music received regular airplay on national broadcaster Triple J, and in late 1989, Andy Berenyi made a memorable live appearance on Australian national television show Countdown Revolution, performing "Eggs, Bacon, Coffee and Suicide".

During their Australian tour in March 1990, the band recorded a live studio session at Triple J's Sydney studios on March 12, 1990. A live rendition of "Straight Ahead Money" from this performance was subsequently issued as a limited-edition 7-inch single (restricted to 500 copies). In New Zealand, the group were featured in music magazine Rip It Up, which dubbed them "Brixton psychedelic rockers" and highlighted their performance at The Gluepot in Auckland on March 31, 1990.

In Japan, WEA released localized editions of the album alongside two exclusive extended plays in 1990: Down Under Neath What and Their Heads Exploded (WEA YZ456T), the latter featuring a cover of Chic's "Le Freak". The band also toured as opening acts for major international artists, including Living Colour and Ugly as Sin during their February 1990 European tour.

=== Disbandment, reunion, and aftermath (1991–present) ===
By late 1990 and early 1991, internal friction and financial pressures led to the group's dissolution when Berenyi moved back to the United States. A retrospective article in 2022 noted that the band briefly re-formed in the mid-2000s for select performances before fading from public view once again.

Following the dissolution, Berenyi resided in Kansas City, Missouri, where he continued writing and recording music privately. On October 8, 2018, Berenyi died in Kansas City at the age of 55. Tributes published in The Kansas City Star praised his stage presence, guitar craftsmanship, and artistic dedication, with former lighting technicians and touring companions describing him as "the heart of the band." Drummer Mikal C. passed away in 2015.

== Musical style and critical reception ==
=== Genre categorization and "crotchquake" ===
Music journalists during the late 1980s struggled to assign Under Neath What to a single genre, describing their sound variously as psychedelic rock, hard rock, alternative rock, gothic rock, "futurist metal", glam rock, and sleaze rock.

In a retrospective interview, music critic Simon Reynolds recalled advocating for the band in 1989 and attempting to invent the genre term "crotchquake" to describe their distinctive synthesis of "sexy, raunchy, almost new glam rock sound," a label for which he was humorously teased by contemporary editorial colleagues.

=== Critical reception ===
Contemporary critical assessment of Under Neath What was sharply divided:

- Positive reviews: American trade publication Rockpool gave What Is It? an enthusiastic review in May 1990, highlighting Berenyi's rich vocal delivery and praising tracks such as "Firebomb Telecom", "Their Heads Exploded" (noted for its stop-start funk backing), and "Let's Do It Again" (combining hallucinatory vocals and wah-wah guitar). Reviewing their live performance at New York City's Cat Club on April 11, 1990, Rockpool declared: "When Under Neath What come to your town, do yourself a favor and see them... Under Neath What are going to be the band everyone wishes they knew when."
- Negative reviews: Conversely, several critics offered harsh reviews. In October 1989, the Newcastle University publication The Courier dismissed What Is It? as clichéd motorbike guitar riffs and "drivel lyrics." Similarly, American magazine Stereo Review rated the 1990 US release as a "throwback," criticizing its "casual nihilism" and concluding: "If only these guys could think as well as they can play."

== Band members ==
Classic Lineup

- Andrew "Andy" Berenyi – lead vocals, lead guitar, primary songwriter (1986–1991, mid-2000s; died 2018)
- Tim Ashton – bass guitar, backing vocals (1986–1991, mid-2000s)
- Mikal C. – drums, percussion (1986–1990; died 2015)

Other Associated Members

- Peter Peetoom – drums (early sessions / live 1988)
- Mike Williams – drums (touring 1990–1991)

== Discography ==
=== Studio albums ===
Year	Title	Album details
1989	What Is It?	Released: October 1989 (UK), March 1990 (US); Label: WEA (UK), Atco/Atlantic (US) (Cat #91357); Formats: Vinyl LP, CD, Cassette

=== EPs and mini-albums ===
Year	Title	EP details
1990	Down Under Neath What	Released: 1990; Label: WEA / EastWest (Japan); Formats: CD, Vinyl
1990	Their Heads Exploded	Released: 1990; Label: EastWest (UK) (Cat #YZ456T); Formats: 12-inch Vinyl, CD

=== Singles ===
Year	Title	Peak chart positions UK Indie	Album
1989	"Firebomb Telecom"	15	What Is It?
1989	"Bad Karma Chameleon"	18	What Is It?
1989	"Get Outta The Way"	—	What Is It?
1990	"Straight Ahead Money" (Live in Sydney)	—	Non-album single (Limited 500 copies)
