= Macula Transfer =

Studio album by Edgar Froese
- Released: June 1976
- Recorded: June 1976 Amber Studios (Berlin)
- Length: 35:58
- Label: Brain/Metronome
- Producer: Edgar Froese

Edgar Froese chronology
Epsilon in Malaysian Pale (1975)	Macula Transfer (1976)	Ages (1978)

Macula Transfer is the third solo album released by Tangerine Dream leader Edgar Froese, in 1976.

== Description ==
The tracks were composed on plane flights while Tangerine Dream was touring; each track is named after the flight number of an airplane.

The original album was released on Brain Records, and has not officially been released on CD. During 1998 the original recording was licensed by Manikin Records and released as a CD; however, this was done without Froese's consent. It was quickly withdrawn from sale under threat of legal action.

Froese subsequently remixed the album, adding newly recorded material to the 1970s recordings. The new reworked album is available on CD under the original title, with new cover art. This reworking enabled Froese to extend the duration of the copyright on the music, and avoid various contract and licensing issues.

== Track listing ==
No.	Title	Length
1.	"OS 452"	7:56
2.	"AF 765"	11:04
3.	"PA 701"	7:36
4.	"Qantas 611"	4:58
5.	"IF 810"	4:26
