= Idée Fixe (album) =

1978 studio album by Aerolit

Studio album by Czesław Niemen
- Released: 1978
- Genres: Electronic; experimental; progressive rock; sung poetry; jazz fusion
- Length: 77:23
- Label: Polskie Nagrania Muza (LP)

Czesław Niemen chronology
Katharsis (1976)	Idée Fixe (1978)	The Best of Niemen (1979)

Professional ratings
Review scores
Source	Rating
Teraz Rock	4/5 stars

Idée Fixe is an album by Czesław Niemen with his accompanying band Aerolit. It was released in 1978 on two long play and one extended play discs, then digitally remastered and reissued in 2003 on two CDs, and again in 2023 as a double-Hybrid SACD album.

The music of the main two LP discs is highly conceptual and deal with Cyprian Kamil Norwid's poems, philosophy, and worldview. The EP disc contains fragments of the score for Juliusz Słowacki's Sen srebrny Salomei. The inner part of the sleeve contains a reproduction of a painting Ode to Venus by Czesław Niemen. The four-page booklet has the songs' titles and the lyrics printed in Polish and English, as well as a quote by T. S. Eliot serving as a motto.

== Track listing ==
All music by Czesław Niemen. Tracks 1, 4 (Side A), 6 (Side B), 9-10 (Side C) and 11-12 (Side D) are all instrumental. Tracks 2, 3 (Side A), 5 and 7 (Side B), 8 (Side C) and 13 (Side D) feature lyrics by Cyprian Kamil Norwid.

=== Side 1 ===
1. "QSS (Sygnały)" - 3:07
2. "Larwa" - 7:20
3. "Moja piosenka" - 6:44
4. "W poszukiwaniu źródła" - 2:35

=== Side 2 ===
1. "Chłodna ironia przemijających pejzaży" - 12:51
2. "Straceńcy" - 1:24
3. "Laur dojrzały" - 5:19

=== Side 3 ===
1. "Idącej kupić talerz pani M." - 5:09
2. "Białe góry" - 11:30
3. "Legenda scytyjska" - 3:23

=== Side 4 ===
1. "QSS II" - 2:40
2. "Twarzą do Słońca" - 7:04
3. "Credo" - 8:16

=== EP ===
Selection from musical score for Juliusz Słowacki's play "Sen srebrny Salomei" ("Salomea's Silver Dream") directed by Bernard Ford-Hanaoka:

1. "Proroctwo Wernyhory", "Spotkanie Leona i Salomei", "W obozie ukraińskim", "Zazdrość Semenki", "Przybycie regimentu", "Defilada", "Mazurek weselny" (instrumentals)
2. "Pieśń Wernyhory" (lyrics Juliusz Słowacki)

== Personnel ==
- Czesław Niemen - vocal, Minimoog, EMS Synthi AKS, Rhodes piano, piano, Mellotron 400, Clavinet C
- Sławomir Piwowar - guitars
- Maciej Radziejewski - guitars
- Jerzy Dziemski - bass, violin, percussion
- Stanisław Kasprzyk - drums, percussion
- Zbigniew Namysłowski - sax

== 2003 CD reissue ==
Idée Fixe I

Studio album by Czesław Niemen
- Released: 2003
- Genres: Electronic; Experimental; Progressive rock
- Length: 48:40
- Label: Polskie Radio (CD)

=== Idée Fixe I ===
1. "Sieroctwo" - 8:48 (lyrics Cyprian Kamil Norwid)
2. "QSS I (Pytanie o naszą skromność)" - 3:04 (instrumental)
3. "Larwa (Wszechcywilizacji społeczny blues)" - 7:27 (lyrics Cyprian Kamil Norwid)
4. "Moja piosenka" - 6:49 (lyrics Cyprian Kamil Norwid)
5. "W poszukiwaniu źródła" - 2:38 (instrumental)
6. "Chłodna ironia przemijających pejzaży" - 13:03 (lyrics Cyprian Kamil Norwid)
7. "Straceńcy (Z wypraw nie tylko krzyżowych)" - 1:26 (instrumental)
8. "Laur dojrzały" - 5:25 (lyrics Cyprian Kamil Norwid)

=== Idée Fixe II ===
Idée Fixe II

Studio album by Czesław Niemen
- Released: 2003
- Genres: Electronic; Progressive rock Experimental; Theatrical music
- Length: 55:54
- Label: Polskie Radio (CD)

1. "Larwa (2)" - 7:22 (lyrics Cyprian Kamil Norwid)
2. "Idącej kupić talerz pani M." - 5:15 (lyrics Cyprian Kamil Norwid)
3. "Białe góry" - 9:35 (instrumental)
4. "Legenda scytyjska" - 3:27 (instrumental)
5. "QSS II" - 2:45 (instrumental)
6. "Twarzą do Słońca" - 7:09 (instrumental)
7. "Credo" - 8:21 (lyrics Cyprian Kamil Norwid)
8. "Proroctwo Wernyhory" - 0:32 (instrumental)
9. "Spotkanie Leona i Salomei" - 0:46 (instrumental)
10. "W obozie ukraińskim" - 1:31 (instrumental)
11. "Zazdrość Semenki" - 0:34 (instrumental)
12. "Przybycie regimentu" - 0:55 (instrumental)
13. "Defilada" - 0:52 (instrumental)
14. "Mazurek weselny" - 1:09 (instrumental)
15. "Pieśń Wernyhory" - 5:43 (lyrics Juliusz Słowacki)

Tracks from 8 to 15 are a selection from musical score for Juliusz Słowacki's play Sen srebrny Salomei directed by Bernard Ford-Hanaoka.
