= Aqua (Edgar Froese album) =

Studio album by Edgar Froese
- Released: June 1974
- Recorded: November 1973–March 1974, Berlin
- Genre: Electronic, ambient
- Length: 47:08
- Label: Virgin, Brain
- Producer: Edgar Froese

Edgar Froese chronology
Aqua (1974)	Epsilon in Malaysian Pale (1975)

Aqua is the debut solo album by Tangerine Dream frontman Edgar Froese, released in 1974.

It was originally released in two different mixes, one by Brain Records in Germany, and the other by Virgin Records in the rest of the world. There is also a re-recorded version from 2005 on Eastgate.

One notable feature of the album is that some of the sound effects on the track "NGC 891" were recorded using what is described as a "revolutionary artificial head system", microphones in the ear canals of a dummy head. This was thought to produce a "surround sound" effect when played back through headphones.

== Track listings ==
Virgin Records
No.	Title	Length
1.	"Aqua"	16:58
2.	"Panorphelia"	9:38
3.	"NGC 891"	14:01
4.	"Upland"	6:31

Brain Records
No.	Title	Length
1.	"NGC 891"	13:50
2.	"Upland"	6:10
3.	"Aqua"	17:00
4.	"Panorphelia"	9:25
