= Katharsis (Czesław Niemen album) =

Studio album by Czesław Niemen
- Released: 1976
- Genre: Progressive electronic, experimental rock, minimal synth
- Length: 33:48; 39:09 (CD Reissue)
- Label: Polskie Nagrania Muza (LP)

Czesław Niemen chronology
Niemen Aerolit (1975)	Katharsis (1976)	Idée Fixe (1978)

Professional ratings
Review scores
Source	Rating
Teraz Rock	3/5 stars

Katharsis is an album by Czesław Niemen released in 1976. It is a concept album about dead ends and traps on the road of expanding human civilization and space exploration. Niemen worked on the recording alone, without help from other musicians.

The track "Epitafium (Pamięci Piotra)" is dedicated to drummer Piotr Dziemski, who helped to record Niemen's previous album "Aerolit" and who had died in 1975.

== Track listing ==
1. "Odkrycie nowej galaktyki" - 2:20
2. "Mleczna Droga" - 3:15
3. "Planeta Ziemia" - 6:45
4. "Fatum" - 2:23
5. "Pieczęć" - 2:51
6. "Z listu do M." - 4:45
7. "Próba ucieczki" - 2:46
8. "Katharsis" - 4:45
9. "Epitafium (Pamięci Piotra)" - 3:58
10. "Dorożką na Księżyc" - 5:21 (2003 CD reissue bonus)

== Personnel ==
- Czesław Niemen - vocal, synthesizers, mellotron 400, clavinet D6, 12-string guitar, synthetic percussion, cymbals, tape effects, flute
- All lyrics by Czesław Niemen.
