= She's a Rainbow =

Single by the Rolling Stones

from the album Their Satanic Majesties Request
- B-side: "2000 Light Years from Home"
- Released: November 1967
- Recorded: 17–21 May 1967
- Studio: Olympic, London
- Genre: Psychedelic pop; baroque pop; psychedelic rock
- Length: 2:48 (US promo single edit); 4:10 (US single); 4:35 (album version)
- Label: London (US); Decca (UK)
- Songwriter: Jagger–Richards
- Producer: The Rolling Stones

The Rolling Stones US singles chronology
"In Another Land" (1967)	"She's a Rainbow" (1967)	"Jumpin' Jack Flash" (1968)

Their Satanic Majesties Request track listing
- 10 tracks Side one: 1. "Sing This All Together"; 2. "Citadel"; 3. "In Another Land"; 4. "2000 Man"; 5. "Sing This All Together (See What Happens)"; Side two: 6. "She's a Rainbow"; 7. "The Lantern"; 8. "Gomper"; 9. "2000 Light Years from Home"; 10. "On with the Show"

"She's a Rainbow" is a song by the Rolling Stones and was featured on their 1967 album Their Satanic Majesties Request. It has been called "the prettiest and most uncharacteristic song" that Mick Jagger and Keith Richards wrote for the Stones, although somewhat ambiguous in intention.

== Composition and recording ==
The song includes rich lyricism, vibrant piano by Nicky Hopkins, and Brian Jones' use of the Mellotron. The second verse includes:

Have you seen her all in gold,
Like a queen in days of old?
She shoots colours all around
like a sunset going down.
Have you seen a lady fairer?

John Paul Jones, later of Led Zeppelin, arranged the strings of this song during his session musician days. Backing vocals were provided by the entire band except for Charlie Watts. Notably, all of the vocals sound like soft background singing with the music overshadowing them to the point of the lyrics being difficult to hear. The lyrics in the chorus share the phrase "she comes in colours" with the song of that title by Love, released in December 1966.

The song begins with the piano playing an ascending run with a turnaround, which returns throughout the song as a recurring motif. This motif is developed by the celesta and strings in the middle 8. Humorous and ambiguous devices are used, such as when the strings play out-of-tune and off-key towards the end of the song, and when the other Stones sing their "La La's" like little children. The song is in the key of B flat major. The ascending run starts on C and goes up the B♭ scale : C D E♭ F G B♭ A.

== Release and appearances ==
"She's a Rainbow" was released as a single in November 1967 and went to No. 25 in the United States. Cash Box said that the Rolling Stones "[step] up their blues beat with orchestrations that surround the listener in a swirling collage of offsetting tonal colors". A lyric video for the song was released in 2017 to coincide with the semicentennial reissue of the album it appears on.

It has regularly featured on Stones' hits compilations, including Through the Past, Darkly (Big Hits Vol. 2) (1969), More Hot Rocks (Big Hits & Fazed Cookies) (1972), 30 Greatest Hits (1977), Singles Collection: The London Years (1989), Forty Licks (2002), and GRRR! (2012).

== Cover versions ==
Several artists have recorded cover versions of "She's a Rainbow". The best known versions include the following:

- Molly Tuttle covered the song for her album But I'd Rather Be with You (2020), releasing it as a single in August 2020. Tuttle introduced a "feminist spin" to her version of the song.
- The Polyphonic Spree recorded a cover version that was featured in the television series Legion.

== Personnel ==
According to authors Philippe Margotin and Jean-Michel Guesdon:

The Rolling Stones

- Mick Jagger – lead vocal, harmony vocal, tambourine
- Keith Richards – acoustic guitar, lead guitar
- Brian Jones – Mellotron
- Bill Wyman – bass
- Charlie Watts – drums
- Unidentified musicians (played by the Rolling Stones) – backing vocals, percussion (Note: Margotin and Guesdon suggest the percussion heard from 2:45 on may be bongos played with drumsticks or Cuban timbales.)

Additional personnel

- Nicky Hopkins – celesta, piano, harpsichord
- John Paul Jones – string arrangement
- Unidentified session musicians – string section

== Charts ==
Chart (1967–1968)	Peak position
Austria (Ö3 Austria Top 40)	8
Belgium (Ultratop 50 Flanders)	13
Canada Hit Parade (CHUM Chart)	1
Canada Top Singles (RPM)	9
Netherlands (Single Top 100)	2
New Zealand (Listener)	5
Spanish Singles Chart	19
Sweden (Kvällstoppen)	14
Sweden (Tio i Topp)	9
Switzerland (Schweizer Hitparade)	3
US Billboard Hot 100	25
Chart (2007)	Peak position
Denmark (Tracklisten)	25
Switzerland (Schweizer Hitparade)	91
Chart (2018)	Peak position
US Hot Rock & Alternative Songs (Billboard)	21
Chart (2019)	Peak position
US Hot Rock & Alternative Songs (Billboard)	41

== Certifications ==
Region	Certification	Certified units/sales
Australia (ARIA)	Gold	35,000^{‡}
United Kingdom (BPI)	Silver	200,000^{‡}
^{‡} Sales+streaming figures based on certification alone.

== In popular culture ==
People have speculated that Gilbert Baker's creation of the rainbow flag was inspired by the Judy Garland song "Over the Rainbow" (Garland being among the first gay icons), but when asked, Baker said that it was "more about the Rolling Stones and their song 'She's a Rainbow.'"

"She's a Rainbow" was used by Apple for background music of one of the iMac G3 advertisements. It is used in the season 2 episode, "Rainbow," of Apple TV+’s Ted Lasso.
