= Niemen Aerolit =

Studio album by Czesław Niemen
- Released: 1975
- Genre: Electronic; jazz rock; experimental; progressive rock
- Length: 38:35
- Label: Polskie Nagrania Muza (LP)

Czesław Niemen chronology
Mourner's Rhapsody (1974)	Niemen Aerolit (1975)	Katharsis (1976)

Professional ratings
Review scores
Source	Rating
Teraz Rock	4/5 stars

Niemen Aerolit is Czesław Niemen's album recorded in 1975 with his new band "Aerolit".

== Track listing ==
1. "Cztery ściany świata" - 10:24 (lyrics Jonasz Kofta)
2. "Pielgrzym" - 9:22 (lyrics Cyprian Kamil Norwid)
3. "Kamyk" - 7:16 (lyrics Zbigniew Herbert)
4. "Daj mi wstążkę błękitną" - 4:14 (lyrics Cyprian Kamil Norwid)
5. "Smutny Ktoś i biedny Nikt" - 7:19 (lyrics Maria Pawlikowska-Jasnorzewska)

== Personnel ==
- Czesław Niemen - vocal, moog, mellotron
- Sławomir Piwowar - guitars
- Jacek Gazda - bass
- Andrzej Nowak - electric piano
- Piotr Dziemski - drums
