= Pinnacles (Edgar Froese album) =

Studio album by Edgar Froese
- Released: August 1983
- Recorded: May 1983
- Studios: Amber Studio, Berlin, Germany
- Genres: Electronic, New age, Berlin-School
- Length: 43:07
- Label: Virgin
- Producer: Edgar Froese

Edgar Froese chronology
Kamikaze 1989 (1982)	Pinnacles (1983)	Dalinetopia (2005)

Professional ratings
Review scores
Source	Rating
Allmusic	4/5 stars

Pinnacles (1983) is the sixth solo album by Tangerine Dream founder Edgar Froese. Pinnacles would be Froese's last solo album until Dalinetopia (2005). The album is named after The Pinnacles in the Australian Outback, which Froese had a deep admiration for.

== Track listing ==
All compositions written, performed and produced by Edgar Froese.

Side 1
No.	Title	Length
1.	"Specific Gravity of Smile"	9:35
2.	"The Light Cone"	4:22
3.	"Walkabout"	7:10

Side 2
No.	Title	Length
4.	"Pinnacles"	22:00
