= Edgar Froese =

German electronic musician (1944–2015)

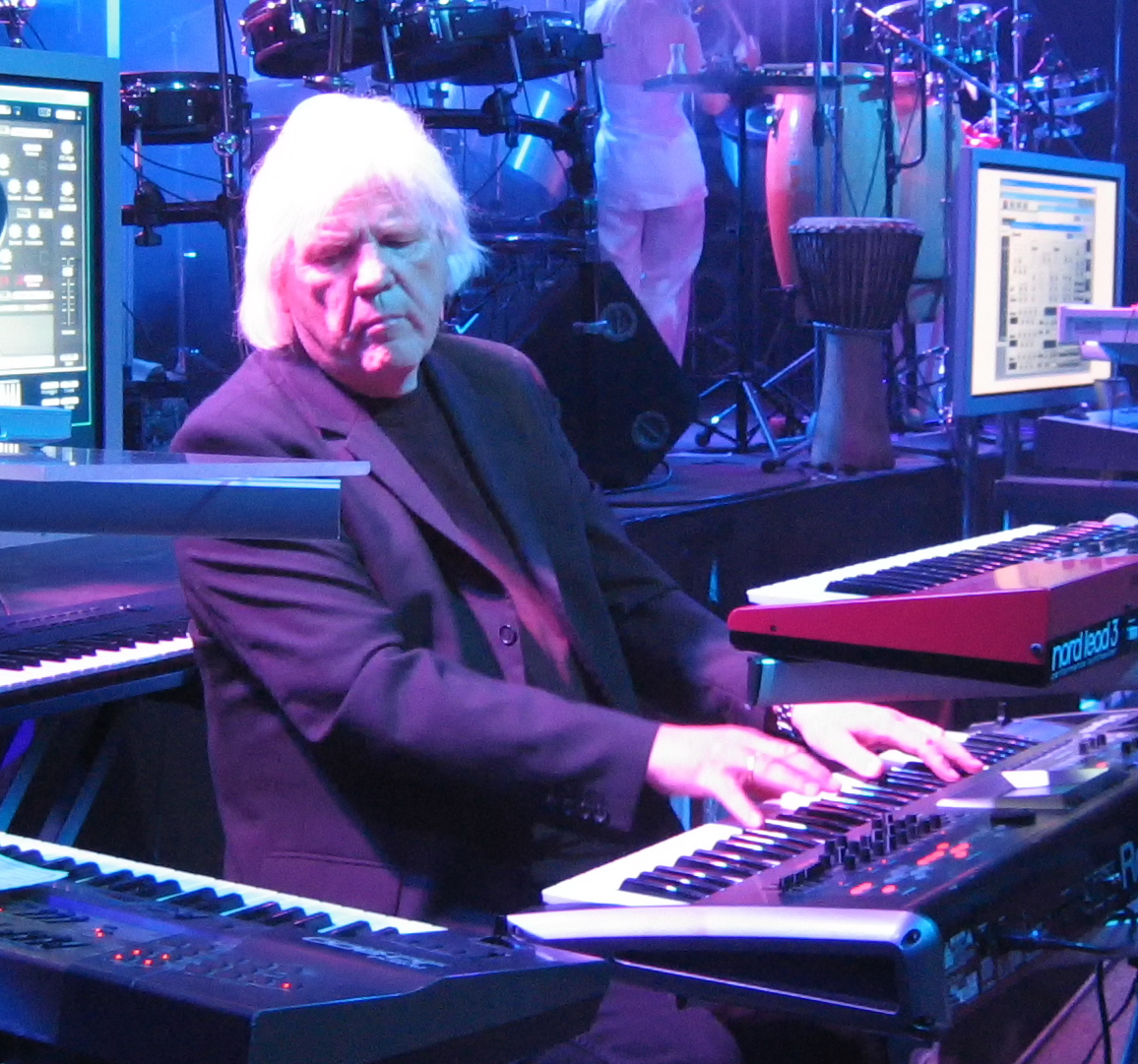
- Froese performing with Tangerine Dream in 2007

Background information
- Born: Edgar Willmar Froese; 6 June 1944; Tilsit, East Prussia, Germany (now Sovetsk, Russia)
- Died: 20 January 2015 (aged 70) Vienna, Austria
- Genre: Electronic music
- Occupations: Musician; composer
- Instruments: Piano; synthesizer; guitar; bass guitar; harmonica; mellotron; organ; horn; mellophonium
- Years active: 1964–2015
- Labels: Virgin; EMI
- Formerly of: Tangerine Dream
- Website: edgarfroese.com

Edgar Willmar Froese (German: [ˈɛtɡaʁ ˈfʁøːzə]; 6 June 1944 – 20 January 2015) was a German musical artist and electronic music pioneer, best known for founding the electronic music group Tangerine Dream in 1967. Froese was the only continuous member of the group until his death. His solo and group recordings prior to 2003 name him as "Edgar Froese", and his later solo albums bear the name "Edgar W. Froese".

== Biography ==
Froese was born in Tilsit, East Prussia (now Sovetsk, Russia), on D-Day during World War II; members of his family, including his father, had been killed by the Nazis and after the war his mother and surviving family settled in Berlin. He took piano lessons from the age of 12, and started playing guitar at 15. After showing an early aptitude for art, Froese enrolled at the Academy of the Arts in Berlin to study painting and sculpture.

One of his most lucrative jobs was to design advertising posters for the Berlin buses. He started an evening degree in Psychology and Philosophy and prepared a dissertation for doctorate on Kant's categorical imperative. Since his interpretation was not in accordance with the academic way of thinking, he left the college without completing the doctorate with the remark: "The dust of the universities is like a shroud over the truth."

In 1965 he formed a band called The Ones, who played psychedelic rock, and some rock R&B standards. While playing in Spain, The Ones were invited to perform at Salvador Dalí's villa in Cadaqués. Froese's encounter with Dalí was highly influential, inspiring him to pursue more experimental directions with his music. The Ones disbanded in 1967, having released only one single "Lady Greengrass" (b/w "Love of Mine") on Star-Club Records. After returning to Berlin, Froese began recruiting musicians for the free-rock band that would become Tangerine Dream.

== Personal life and death ==
Froese declared himself to be vegetarian, teetotal, and a non-smoker; he also did not take drugs. Froese was married to artist and photographer Monika (Monique) Froese from 1974 until her death in 2000. Their son Jerome Froese was a member of Tangerine Dream from 1990 through 2006. In 2002, Edgar Froese married artist and musician Bianca Froese-Acquaye.

Froese was a friend of such artists as David Bowie, Brian Eno, Iggy Pop, George Moorse, Volker Schlöndorff, Alexander Hacke and Friedrich Gulda. Pop and Bowie lived with Froese and his family at their home in Schöneberg before moving to their apartment on Hauptstraße. Froese also helped Bowie with his recovery from drugs and introduced him to the Berlin underground scene. Bowie named Froese's solo album Epsilon in Malaysian Pale as a big influence and a soundtrack to his life in Berlin.

Froese died in Vienna on 20 January 2015 from a pulmonary embolism. He was posthumously awarded the Schallwelle Honorary Award for Lifetime Achievement in 2015. He was quoted by the BBC as having once said: "there is no death, there is just a change of our cosmic address".

== Solo discography ==
Studio albums

Year	Album name	Label
1974	Aqua	Virgin/Brain
1975	Epsilon in Malaysian Pale	Virgin/Brain
1976	Macula Transfer	Brain
1978	Ages	Virgin
1979	Stuntman	Virgin
1982	Kamikaze 1989 (Film Soundtrack)	Virgin
1983	Pinnacles	Virgin
2005	Dalinetopia	Eastgate

Tangerine Dreams albums performed solely by Froese

Year	Album name	Label
2005	Phaedra 2005	Eastgate
2007	Summer in Nagasaki	Eastgate
2007	One Times One	Eastgate
2008	Tangram 2008	Eastgate
2008	Hyperborea 2008	Eastgate
2009	Chandra	Eastgate
2009	A Cage in Search of a Bird	Eastgate
2009	Winter in Hiroshima	Eastgate
2012	Machu Picchu	Eastgate

Compilations

Year	Album name	Label	Notes
1980	Electronic Dreams	Brain	
1981	Solo 1974–1979	Virgin	
1995	Beyond the Storm	Virgin	Includes new and remixed tracks
2003	Introduction to the Ambient Highway	TDP International	Sampler
2003	Ambient Highway, Vol. 1	TDP International	Includes new and remixed tracks
2003	Ambient Highway, Vol. 2	TDP International	Includes new and remixed tracks
2003	Ambient Highway, Vol. 3	TDP International	Includes new and remixed tracks
2003	Ambient Highway, Vol. 4	TDP International	Includes new and remixed tracks
2005	Orange Light Years	Eastgate	Includes new and remixed tracks
2012	Solo 1974–1983 – The Virgin Years	Virgin	

=== Other appearances ===
Year	Artist name	Song title	Album title	Notes
1981	Tangerine Dream	"Baryll Blue"	'70 – '80	Ages recording sessions outtake
1992	Various Artists	"Michiko"	The Best of the O1/W	Promotion of the Korg 01/W synthesizer.
2011	William Shatner	"Learning to Fly"	Seeking Major Tom	Played guitar and keyboards.
2013	William Shatner	"Do You See?"	Ponder the Mystery	Guitar solo

=== Edgar Froese solo material as Tangerine Dream ===
"Baryll Blue" on Tangerine Dream compilation album '70 – '80 is solely composed and performed by Froese as the side F contains solo recordings by all three members of the classic line-up of the band (Froese, Franke and Baumann).

Tangents was a Tangerine Dream compilation album box set of five CDs issued in 1994, compiling music from their years with Virgin Records, 1973 to 1983. Disc five consists entirely of "previously unreleased material": ten tracks, seven of which are credited only to Froese as the composer. No information is given as to where or when these tracks were recorded, or by which line-up of Tangerine Dream. Most Tangerine Dream tracks credit the line-up that recorded it as the composers, therefore these appear to be Froese solo tracks, released under the Tangerine Dream name, and may have been recorded for this album. Furthermore, five tracks on disc three are described as "re-recordings by Edgar Froese", while the remaining tracks on discs three and four are described as "re-mixed plus additional recordings by Edgar Froese". The tracks on discs one and two are also remixed and contain new overdubs, and Froese is credited as producer for the entire album.

Another compilation box set, the 6-CD I-Box (2001) contains further bonus tracks credited only to Froese: "Ivory Town", "Storm Seekers", "Cool Shibuya" and "Akash Deep". Several of Froese's tracks from Tangents are included as well.

The Tangerine Dream album Views from a Red Train (2008) was originally announced as an Edgar Froese solo album. It was eventually expanded with other band members performing, but the album remains composed entirely by Froese.

== Books ==
- Froese, Edgar; Froese-Acquaye, Bianca; Bonin, Paul (2017). Tangerine Dream Force Majeure The Autobiography. Berlin, Deutschland. ISBN 978-3-00-056525-0. OCLC 1149780339.
- Stump, Paul (1997). Digital gothic : a critical discography of Tangerine Dream. Wembley, Middx., England: SAF. ISBN 0-946719-18-7. OCLC 38550915.

== See also ==
- List of ambient music artists
