= Geoff Unwin =

English musician and composer

- Born: 8 October 1936 (age 90); Liverpool, England
- Occupations: Musician, composer
- Known for: Mellotron

Geoff Unwin (born 8 October 1936) is an English musician and composer. He was an early user and promoter of the Mellotron, a tape-based sampling keyboard, and co-wrote the theme music for the first On the Buses film.

== Biography ==
Unwin was born on 8 October 1936 and grew up in Norris Green, Liverpool. He studied at a branch of the London College of Music in Liverpool and started playing in variety theatre in 1947.

By 1962, he was working in The Magic Carpet Inn in Chelsea, London, where he was spotted by big band leader Eric Robinson and television personality and magician David Nixon. He started working for Robinson and Nixon through their company Mellotronics, and it was through this association that he became the featured artist on Mellotron promotional appearances, both live and on television and radio. He featured on a ten-minute promotional film made by Pathé that was regularly shown in cinemas and appeared on the children's television show Blue Peter, demonstrating the Mellotron to Valerie Singleton. Unwin claims to have visited John Lennon when Lennon was living in Weybridge, Surrey in the mid-1960s "to give him a few pointers" and toured South Africa in 1966.

Unwin left Mellotronics in 1969 and started working for EMI as an A&R man and producer, where he composed the music for the first film version of On The Buses, including co-writing the theme tune with Roger Ferris.

Unwin moved to Spain in the mid-1980s after his daughter, Naomi, decided to relocate there after getting married but returned to the UK in 1988. Naomi later found fame on the Spanish television show Un, Dos, Tres.

== Discography ==
- Hammer Comedy Film Music Collection (composer)
