= Kamikaze 1989 =

1982 film

- Directed by: Wolf Gremm
- Screenplay by: Wolf Gremm; Robert Katz
- Based on: Murder on the Thirty-First Floor by Per Wahlöö
- Produced by: Regina Ziegler
- Starring: Rainer Werner Fassbinder
- Cinematography: Xaver Schwarzenberger
- Edited by: Thorsten Näter
- Music by: Edgar Froese
- Release date: 16 July 1982
- Running time: 106 minutes
- Country: West Germany
- Language: German

Kamikaze 1989 is a 1982 West German cyberpunk thriller film co-written and directed by Wolf Gremm, based on the 1964 novel Murder on the Thirty-First Floor by Per Wahlöö. It stars Rainer Werner Fassbinder as a detective investigating a string of bombings that leads to a corporate media conspiracy. The soundtrack was composed by Tangerine Dream founder Edgar Froese.

After being nominated for the grand prize at the 1983 Avoriaz International Fantastic Film Festival, the film earned a Critics' Award special mention at the 1984 Fantasporto festival, where it was also nominated for the International Fantasy Film prize.

== Plot ==
Germany in 1989. The country is rich, all problems seem to have been solved, there is no pollution and there is no unemployment. Alcohol has been banned, but freedom has been eradicated. For example, home-grown vegetables are banned, there are no more suicides (only "unexpected deaths"), television ensures peace and quiet with programs such as the annual laughing competition (which is ranked alongside Einstein and Napoleon) and the always positive weather report, the police (symbol: fist with stretched thumb) with their action against "Prokos" for order. All media are in the hands of a corporation whose management belongs to one and the same family. Criticism is articulated only in the comic series “Blue Panther”, a caricature of the high-handed company boss and his opponent Krysmopompas.

When the company is threatened with a bomb explosion that fails to materialize, the police chief gives Lieutenant Jansen four days to investigate the case. Jansen, an eccentric in a leopard suit and a "third degree" alcoholic, is a somewhat squeamish policeman who has solved all of his previous cases.

From the start, the case seems to be related to the mysterious 31st floor of the corporate building. The paper used for the threatening letter suggests it was sent by someone within the company. After the company's HR manager dies an “unexpected death”, the CEO's nephew is initially suspected, but Jansen can immediately rule out that he was the perpetrator (but this does not prevent him from using acoustic torture methods). Other suspects are the former company employee Zerling, who is involved in the appearance of the Blue Panther, the television presenter Barbara, also an alcoholic, and the management assistant Elena Farr.

Again and again Jansen is offered the role of crysmopompas by unknown and well-known figures, which Jansen does not really accept. When Jansen and his assistant MK1 Anton are followed by the CEO's nephew, he dies in an accident on the autobahn.

Finally, the real perpetrator, the intellectual Weiss, presents himself. He tells Jansen about the 31st floor. There, the last critically thinking publicists are silenced by working on writings whose publications are endlessly delayed. Weiss wrote another threatening letter, but again did not plant a bomb. But the company did that itself to finally silence its already gagged employees on the 31st floor.

== Cast ==
- Rainer Werner Fassbinder: Police Lieutenant Jansen
- Günther Kaufmann: MK1 Anton
- Arnold Marquis: Chief of police
- Boy Gobert: Group Chief Executive
- Richy Müller: nephew
- Jörg Holm: Vice-president
- Brigitte Mira: Human Resources Director
- Hans Wyprächtiger: Zerling
- Nicole Heesters: Barbara
- Petra Jokisch: Elena Farr
- Franco Nero: Weiss

== Soundtrack ==
Kamikaze 1989

Soundtrack album by Edgar Froese
- Released: 1982
- Recorded: 1982
- Genres: Electronic, film score
- Length: 40:03
- Label: Virgin Records
- Producer: Edgar Froese

Edgar Froese chronology
Stuntman (1979)	Kamikaze 1989 (1982)	Pinnacles (1983)

The music for the film was composed, performed, and produced by Edgar Froese.

=== Track listing ===
1. "Videophonic" (4:17)
2. "Vitamin C" (2:17)
3. "Krismopompas" (3:19)
4. "Police Disco" (4:55)
5. "Intuition" (2:05)
6. "Police Therapy Center" (2:35)
7. "Blue Panther" (3:08)
8. "Snake Bath" (4:50)
9. "Unexpected Death" (2:56)
10. "Flying Kamikaze" (4:00)
11. "Tower Block" (3:30)
12. "The 31st Floor" (2:15)
