= Ages (album) =

Studio album by Edgar Froese
- Released: January 13, 1978
- Recorded: August–November 1977
- Studios: Amber Studio, Berlin
- Genres: Electronic, Ambient, Berlin-School
- Length: 83:18
- Label: Virgin
- Producer: Edgar Froese

Edgar Froese chronology
Macula Transfer (1976)	Ages (1978)	Stuntman (1979)

Ages is Tangerine Dream leader Edgar Froese's fourth studio album, released in 1978.

Originally a double LP, it was reissued by Virgin Records in 1997 on one CD, with the closing track "Golgatha and the Circle Closes" missing. Froese has since remixed the album and released it on his own Eastgate label in 2005. This version omitted "Children's Deeper Study" (not the same one as before) and another song, "Metropolis", was shortened.

The album was recorded in Autumn 1977 at Amber Studios in Berlin. The drums and percussion were played by Klaus Krüger (a.k.a. Klaus Krieger) who was in Tangerine Dream at the time. Some parts of songs on the album were later reused on Tangerine Dream's albums, most notably "Nights of Automatic Women", which is very similar to "Madrigal Meridian" from Cyclone. Before the album was released, "Ode to Granny A" was released in an abridged form as the b-side to Tangerine Dream's live single "Encore", under the title "Hobo March".

== Reception ==
On its initial release, the album failed to chart in any territory.

A review on the AllMusic website by Jim Brenholts awarded the album 4.5 stars stating "Edgar Froese is a great musician and a shrewd businessman. Realizing that he and his associates would need money to fund the progress of Tangerine Dream, he took advantage of both of those qualities and launched his solo career while Tangerine Dream was still in their infancy. That solo career has contributed many gems and classics to the e-music community. Ages is one of those classics. This album has all of Froese's virtuosity and something that his listeners rarely hear—a sense of humor. Froese does not show that side of himself to his listeners very often, so it is a treat. Putting that positive energy into play does much for this album; it makes it a classic.

== Track listing ==
Original release
No.	Title	Length
1.	"Metropolis"	11:10
2.	"Era of the Slaves"	8:02
3.	"Tropic of Capricorn"	21:00
4.	"Nights of Automatic Women"	9:01
5.	"Icarus"	9:09
6.	"Children's Deeper Study"	4:21
7.	"Ode to Granny A"	4:40
8.	"Pizarro and Atahuallpa"	7:33
9.	"Golgatha and the Circle Closes"	8:31

2005 reissue
No.	Title	Length
1.	"Ikarus"	9:14
2.	"Metropolis"	5:50
3.	"Era of the Slaves"	8:10
4.	"Nights of Automatic Women"	10:06
5.	"Ode to Granny A"	4:48
6.	"Pizarro and Atahuallpa"	8:14
7.	"Tropic of Capricorn"	20:47
8.	"Golgatha and the Circle Closes"	9:34

== Personnel ==
- Edgar Froese – guitar, keyboards, synthesizer
- Klaus Krüger – drums, percussion
