= 2000 Light Years from Home =

- US picture sleeve (reverse)

Single by the Rolling Stones

from the album Their Satanic Majesties Request
- A-side: "She's a Rainbow"
- Released: November 1967 (US single); 8 December 1967 (UK album)
- Recorded: July & September 1967
- Studio: Olympic, London
- Genre: Psychedelic rock; space rock
- Length: 2:52 (US promo single edit); 4:45 (single & album version)
- Label: London (US); Decca (UK)
- Songwriter: Jagger–Richards
- Producer: The Rolling Stones

The Rolling Stones US singles chronology
"In Another Land" (1967)	"She's a Rainbow" / "2000 Light Years from Home" (1967)	"Jumpin' Jack Flash" (1968)

"2000 Light Years from Home" is a song by the English rock band the Rolling Stones, released on their 1967 album Their Satanic Majesties Request. Written by Mick Jagger and Keith Richards, it also appeared as the B-side to the American single "She's a Rainbow", and charted as a single in Germany.

Jagger reportedly wrote the lyrics in Brixton prison following his conviction on drug charges in June 1967. The song was recorded by the band at Olympic Studios during July and September 1967. The working title of the instrumental backing was "Toffee Apple". Brian Jones performs prominent accompaniment on a Mellotron.

The number was regularly featured during the Stones' 1989–90 Steel Wheels/Urban Jungle Tours.

Until 1997, when "She's a Rainbow" was also added to the band's stage repertoire, it was the only track from Satanic Majesties that the band had performed in concert. For the first time in 23 years, The Rolling Stones played "2000 Light Years from Home" on 29 June 2013 at The Glastonbury Festival.

== Live version ==
In 1991, a live version was released as the B-side to "Highwire".

== Cover versions ==
Several artists have recorded cover versions of "2000 Light Years from Home":

- Under Neath What: Recorded a version for their album What Is It (1989), which was also included on their UK 12-inch vinyl EP Their Heads Exploded (1990).
- The Danse Society: Released a single version in 1984.
- Monster Magnet: Recorded a version for their album 4-Way Diablo (2007).

== Personnel ==
According to authors Philippe Margotin and Jean-Michel Guesdon, except where noted:

- Mick Jagger – vocals, maracas
- Keith Richards – backing vocals, electric guitar, fuzz bass
- Brian Jones – Mellotron, electric dulcimer
- Bill Wyman – bass, oscillator
- Charlie Watts – drums

Additional personnel

- Nicky Hopkins – piano
- Unidentified musicians – female backing vocals, (Note: Margotin and Guesdon write that Jagger and Richards' vocals during the refrains at 2:36 and 3:49 are accompanied by two unidentified female voices, possibly contributed by singers Marianne Faithfull and Anita Pallenberg.) plucked piano strings, claves (Note: Margotin and Guesdon suggest the claves were played by Eddie Kramer, the session's assistant sound engineer.)

== Charts ==
Chart (1968)	Peak position
West Germany (GfK)	5
