= Epsilon in Malaysian Pale =

Album by Edgar Froese

Studio album by Edgar Froese
- Released: September 26, 1975
- Recorded: June–July 1975, Berlin
- Genre: Electronic, ambient
- Length: 33:26
- Label: Virgin, Brain (Germany)
- Producer: Edgar Froese

Edgar Froese chronology
| Aqua (1974) | Epsilon in Malaysian Pale (1975) | Macula Transfer (1976) |

Epsilon in Malaysian Pale, released as Ypsilon in Malaysian Pale by Brain Records in Germany, is the second solo album by German recording artist Edgar Froese, released in 1975.

== Music ==
AllMusic stated that the album "is the Froese solo record closest in sound to Tangerine Dream." Froese used synthesizers to recreate the sounds of flutes, horns and strings. Pitchfork said the sound was "wholly organic, subtle, and alive."

== Recording and history ==
Epsilon in Malaysian Pale was recorded in June and July 1975, following Tangerine Dream's Australian tour, and was heavily influenced by the places they visited during the tour.

David Bowie named Epsilon in Malaysian Pale as an influence for his Berlin Trilogy albums Low, "Heroes", and Lodger. "It was the soundtrack of my life when I lived in Berlin", Bowie once said.

The album consists of two instrumental compositions, each originally filling one side of vinyl. The first, "Epsilon in Malaysian Pale," is a Mellotron-based piece inspired by Froese's visit to a Malaysian jungle. The second, "Maroubra Bay," is a more synthesizer-based piece named after a place in Australia. "Maroubra Bay" later appeared on the compilation album Electronic Dreams, but was accidentally mastered backwards for that particular release.

In 2004, Froese re-recorded and remixed the album in Vienna, releasing it on his own Eastgate label with a new cover based on the original.

== Critical reception ==
Andy Beta of Pitchfork praised the album, calling it "wholly organic, subtle, and alive", and included it in Pitchfork's list of the 50 best ambient albums of all time. AllMusic gave the album four and a half stars, saying that the music was "as lush and entrancing as listeners are led to believe from the exotic foliage on the cover."

== Track listing ==
1. "Epsilon in Malaysian Pale" – 16:26
2. "Maroubra Bay" – 17:00
