= Electric dulcimer =

Stringed musical instrument

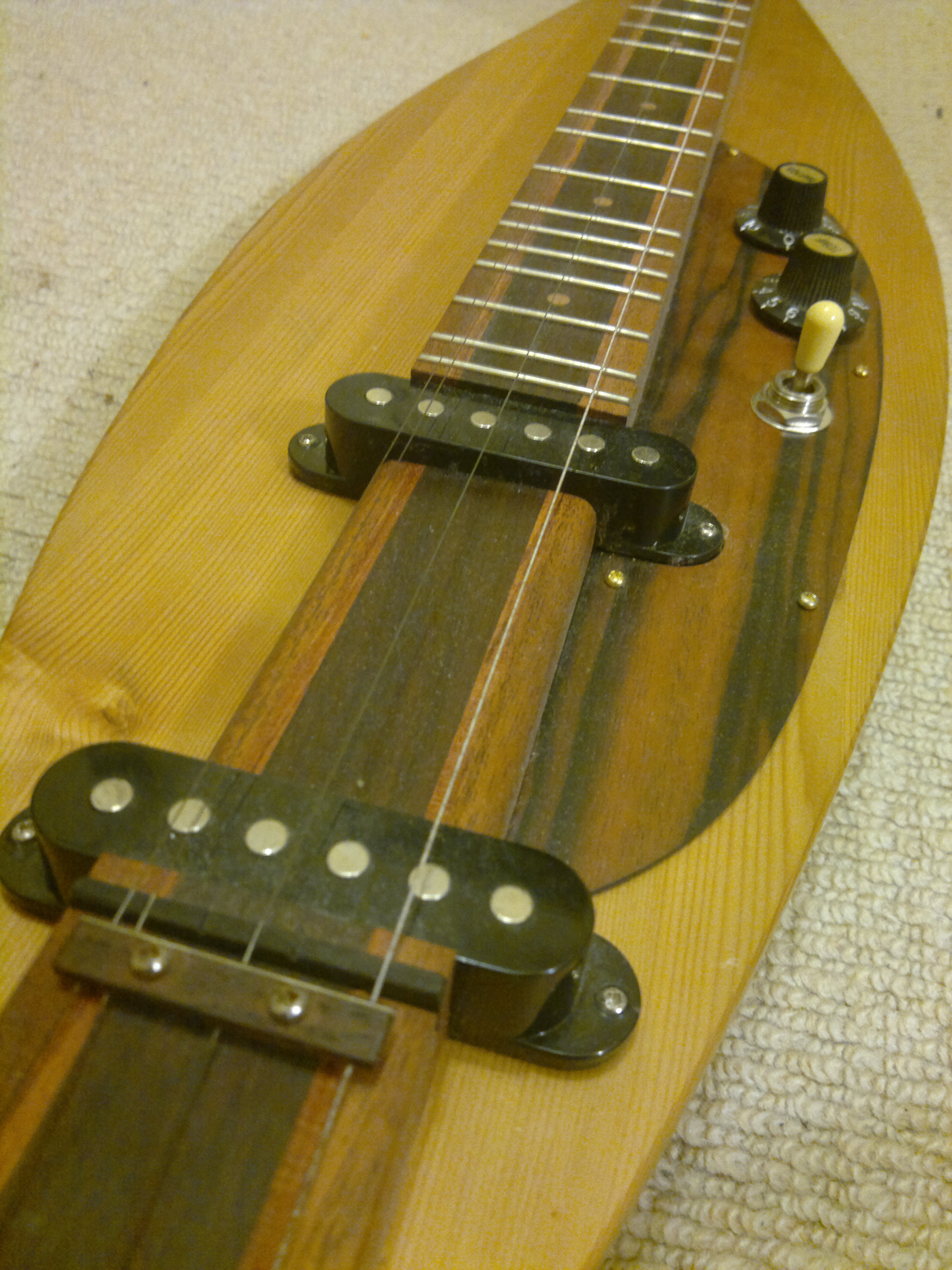
Details of an electric dulcimer

An electric dulcimer is a dulcimer that uses an electric pickup to amplify its sound, similar to an electric guitar. They come in a number of different sizes, styles, and types. The most common type is the electric Appalachian dulcimer, but electric hammered dulcimers also exist. The Dulcicaster is a common example of an electric dulcimer, made by Quintin Stephens. The bass dulcimer is similar to electric dulcimer but with neck, strings and tuning similar to the bass guitar and has a deep sound compared to electric dulcimers.

== The Rolling Stones ==
In 1966, Brian Jones had his electric dulcimer stolen in Washington, D.C., and it is claimed it was the only one in existence at that time. The photo in The Washington Post article shows an instrument about a meter long with 4 strings which is shaped like an elongated violin.
