= Sing This All Together =

1967 song by The Rolling Stones

Song by The Rolling Stones

from the album Their Satanic Majesties Request
- Released: 8 December 1967
- Genre: Psychedelic music; folk
- Length: 3:45
- Label: Decca
- Songwriters: Mick Jagger; Keith Richards
- Producer: The Rolling Stones

"Sing This All Together" is a song by the English rock band The Rolling Stones that appears on their 1967 album Their Satanic Majesties Request.

== Background ==
In late 1967, NME critic Keith Altham went over to Olympic Sound Studios and listened to Mick Jagger singing, and stayed for a 15 minute recording that spawned "Sing This All Together" and "Sing This All Together (See What Happens)". The instrumentation for "Sing This All Together" was already finished, and the Stones just had to add vocals to the track. The song had a working title of "God Bless You". There was a rumor that Paul McCartney sang backing vocals on the track, but that has been debunked.

== Reception ==
Author Sean Egan stated in his book The Mammoth Book of The Rolling Stones that it "suggests, enable us 'to see where we all come from'" and that "Humankind's essential being, no less, is the quest, as the song invokes a mythical state of nature where drums are beaten, where caves are covered in paintings, and where the pictures that emerge 'show that we're all one'". he also states that it "starts as the album means to go on: loose arrangements, introspective pseudo-Taoism and untamed spirits. There's no Beatles-like guarantee that you'll 'enjoy the show', only that an electronically induced sense of time-warp disorientation just might play havoc with your sense of 'the now'". Rolling Stone critic Jon Landau states that it "has a pleasant enough melody combined with its idiotically pretentious chorus." Record Collector critic Oregano Rathbone stated in a review of the 50th anniversary edition of the album that both versions "preach inclusivity but actually sound curdled, rudderless and sinister: the moment when the acid turns on you.”

== Sing This All Together (See What Happens) ==
"Sing This All Together (See What Happens)"

Song by The Rolling Stones

from the album Their Satanic Majesties Request
- Released: 8 December 1967
- Genre: Experimental music
- Length: 8:33 ("Cosmic Christmas" starts after silence at 7:54)
- Label: Decca
- Songwriters: Mick Jagger; Keith Richards
- Producer: The Rolling Stones

The first side of Their Satanic Majesties Request features another track from the same recording as "Sing This All Together" titled "Sing This All Together (See What Happens)".

=== Lyrics ===
The lyrics include various chatter, including Keith Richards asking "where's that joint" and another person saying "flower power, eh?", as well as including a choral chant of the Tibetan Om.

=== Recording ===
The song spawned from the recording of "Sing This All Together". It was recorded while under the influence.

=== Reception ===
Author Sean Egan states that "we are force-fed another bite of a hardly appetizing cherry. The ordeal continues for eight and a half minutes." Author Jon Landau states that it is the "most annoying cut on the album by virtue of the fact that it includes some absolute strokes of genius which are lost by the totally inadequate arrangement and lack of musical direction." Stephen Thomas Erlewine wrote in a review for Pitchfork that "'Sing This All Together (See What Happens)' and 'Gomper' are "supporting evidence for Oldham's thesis that the band was attempting to run out the clock on his dime." and that it "descends into a dry run for Keith's five-string riffing."

=== "Cosmic Christmas" ===
"Cosmic Christmas" is a slowed down version of "We Wish You a Merry Christmas" that appears as a hidden track near the end of the song.

== Personnel ==
=== Sing This All Together ===
According to authors Philippe Margotin and Jean-Michel Guesdon

- Mick Jagger – lead and backing vocals
- Keith Richards – backing vocals, distorted lead guitar, rhythm guitar, bass (Note: Margotin and Guesdon are unsure who contributed bass between Keith Richards and Bill Wyman, but they believe that it is probably Richards.)
- Brian Jones – mellotron, saxophone, backing vocals
- Charlie Watts – drums, backing vocals
- Nicky Hopkins – piano
- Unidentified musicians – backing vocals, güiros, congas, maracas, tambourine, vibes, xylophone, marimba

=== Sing This All Together (See What Happens) ===
According to authors Philippe Margotin and Jean-Michel Guesdon

- Mick Jagger – vocals
- Keith Richards – lead guitar, rhythm guitar
- Brian Jones – mellotron, flute, vibraphone, jew's harp, theremin
- Bill Wyman – bass
- Charlie Watts – drums
- Unidentified musicians – backing vocals, assorted percussion (güiros, maracas, tambourine, etc)

== Sources ==
- Castleman, Harry; Podrazik, Walter J. (1976). All Together Now: The First Complete Beatles Discography 1961–1975. New York, NY: Ballantine Books. ISBN 0-345-25680-8.
- Egan, Sean (2013). The Mammoth Book of the Rolling Stones: An anthology of the best writing about the greatest rock 'n' roll band in the world. Hachette. ISBN 978-1-78033-647-3.
- Hector, James (1995). The Complete Guide to the Music of The Rolling Stones. London, England: Omnibus Press. ISBN 0-7119-4303-6.
- Margotin, Philippe; Guesdon, Jean-Michel (2016). The Rolling Stones All the Songs: The Story Behind Every Track. New York: Black Dog & Leventhal. ISBN 978-0-316-31774-0.
