= Mourner's Rhapsody =

Studio album by Czesław Niemen
- Released: 1974
- Genre: Jazz-rock; art rock; progressive rock
- Length: 39:01 (LP); 48:10 (CD)
- Label: CBS (LP); N&N Records (CD)

Czesław Niemen chronology
Russische Lieder (1974)	Mourner's Rhapsody (1974)	Niemen Aerolit (1975)

Alternative covers
- 1993 CD Reissue

Professional ratings
Review scores
Source	Rating
Teraz Rock	(3/2004) link

Mourner's Rhapsody is an English-language album by Czesław Niemen, recorded in 1974 in New York, USA. Michał Urbaniak invited his friends (also some members of the famous Mahavishnu Orchestra) to support Niemen after his earlier band left to re-initialise their own band SBB (Silesian Blues Band), which now became short for Search, Breakup and Build, Sound Beyond Borders and similar. The album was released in West Germany (1974), the United Kingdom (1975) and the United States (1976). It was re-released on CD in 1993.

The main title Mourner's Rhapsody is a remake of Niemen's cult status initial version issued in 1970 on Enigmatic on which Michał Urbaniak also participated.

Despite the top class cast and progressive music the album didn't sell as good as the initial Polish Enigmatic, which reached a cult status, or even the earlier albums recorded for CBS Records International with SBB (grupa Niemen), e.g. Strange Is This World and Ode to Venus (between 1972 and 1974 SBB participated on 5 albums of Niemen and were called Grupa Niemen at this most creative period).

In 1974 SBB released their very own first live album SBB (1), which immediately reached cult status in all Central Europe and Soviet Union (where it was distributed illegally in underground) and also across the Iron Curtain presenting a new vital direction in progressive rock music already present in some form on their 5 albums recorded with Niemen. Ufortunately Mourner's Rhapsody didn't present this kind of freshness and vitality (also present in Mahavishnu Orchestra) and in 1975 Niemen cast a new Polish band. His new band presented on Niemen Aerolit included a phenomenal guitarist Sławomir Piwowar, who eventually joined SBB in 1978.

After Niemen passed in 2004 Michał Urbaniak joined SBB in 2016 recording with the band 2 albums.

== Track listing ==
1. "Lilacs And Champagne" - 4:05 (lyrics Norman Simon)
2. "I've Got No One Who Needs Me" - 4:14 (lyrics Norman Simon)
3. "I Search For Love" - 4:51 (lyrics Norman Simon)
4. "Baby M" - 5:17 (lyrics Norman Simon)
5. "Inside I'm Dying" - 5:34 (lyrics Norman Simon)
6. "Mourner's Rhapsody" - 15:00 (lyrics Cyprian Kamil Norwid, translation Norman Simon)

=== Extended version (1993 CD reissue) ===
1. "Prelude" - 3:19 (intro from divided track "Mourner's Rhapsody")
2. "Mourner's Rhapsody" - 12:35
3. "Lilacs And Champagne" - 4:05
4. "I Search For Love" - 4:55
5. "I've Got No One Who Needs Me" - 4:14
6. "Baby M" - 5:18
7. "Inside I'm Dying" - 5:35
8. "Half Way Around the World" - 4:21 (new track, lyrics Norman Simon)
9. "I'm Reaching Out To The People" - 3:48 (new track, lyrics Norman Simon)

== Personnel ==
- Czesław Niemen - vocal, piano, Fender piano, mellotron, organ, moog
- Jan Hammer - drums
- Michał Urbaniak - violin
- Rick Laird - bass guitar
- Don Grolnick - piano
- Dave Johnson - percussion
- Seldon Powell - flute
- John Abercrombie - guitar
- Steve Khan - guitar
- Carl Rabinowitz - guitar
- Erin Dickins - vocal
- Gail Cantor - vocal
- Tasha Thomas - vocal
- Choir under direction of Howard Roberts
