= Enigmatic (album) =

Studio album by Czesław Niemen
- Released: January 19, 1970
- Genre: Progressive rock; sung poetry
- Length: 36:17
- Label: Polskie Nagrania Muza (LP)

Czesław Niemen chronology
| Czy mnie jeszcze pamiętasz? (1969) | Enigmatic (1970) | Niemen (1971) |

Professional ratings
Review scores
| Source | Rating |
|---|---|
| Teraz Rock | 5/5 stars |

Enigmatic is the fourth album by Czesław Niemen, released in 1970. It has been considered by some to be the best Polish rock album ever. Inspired in 1968 by Wojciech Młynarski, Niemen decided to make his new album with Polish poetry as lyrics. Recorded in 1969, the album became very popular and was awarded with a golden record in 1971 (in Poland, Golden Records were awarded for selling 160,000 album copies). As of 2012, the album has sold in excess of 5 million copies around the world and remains very popular.

In 1974 "Bema pamięci żałobny rapsod" was rerecorded by Niemen in New York and issued by CBS Records International as "Mourner's Rhapsody". The supporting musicians included Michał Urbaniak of the original crew, John Abercrombie and some members of the famous Mahavishnu Orchestra.

In 1977 the "Bema pamięci żałobny rapsod" intro from the 1970 initial issue was bootlegged by the West German rock band Jane as intro for their elegiac album "Between Heaven and Hell" also immediately achieving golden record status.

== Track listing ==
- All music by Czesław Niemen; lyrics as noted.
1. "Bema pamięci żałobny rapsod" - 16:27 (Cyprian Kamil Norwid)
2. "Jednego serca" - 7:45 (Adam Asnyk)
3. "Kwiaty ojczyste" - 7:25 (Tadeusz Kubiak)
4. "Mów do mnie jeszcze" - 4:40 (Kazimierz Przerwa-Tetmajer)

== Personnel ==
- Czesław Niemen – vocal, Hammond organ
- Zbigniew Namysłowski – alto saxophone
- Janusz Zieliński – bass
- Tomasz Jaśkiewicz – guitar
- Czesław Bartkowski – drums
- Zbigniew Sztyc – tenor saxophone
- Michał Urbaniak – tenor saxophone, flute
- Alibabki – background vocals
