= Gwiazdy mocnego uderzenia: Czesław Niemen =

Compilation album by Czesław Niemen
- Released: 1991
- Recorded: 1962–1965
- Genre: Big beat
- Label: Polskie Nagrania Muza

Czesław Niemen chronology
Terra Deflorata (1989)	Gwiazdy mocnego uderzenia: Czesław Niemen (1991)	Sen o Warszawie (1995)

Gwiazdy mocnego uderzenia: Czesław Niemen is a compilation of Czesław Niemen's first singles recorded with bands Niebiesko-Czarni, Bossa Nova Combo and band of Studio Rytm.

== Reception ==
Professional ratings
Review scores
Source	Rating
Teraz Rock	2/5 stars

== Track listing ==
1. "Adieu Tristesse" (music and lyrics Antônio Carlos Jobim)
2. "Mamo, nasza mamo" (music and lyrics Jacek Grań)
3. "Pod papugami" (music Mateusz Święcicki, lyrics Bogusław Choiński and Jan Gałkowski)
4. "Wiem, że nie wrócisz" (music Czesław Niemen, lyrics Jacek Grań)
5. "Locomotion" (music Carole King, lyrics Gerry Goffin)
6. "Czy mnie jeszcze pamiętasz?" (music Czesław Niemen, lyrics Jacek Grań)
7. "Tylko mi nie mów o tym" (music J. Higgins, lyrics Jacek Grań)
8. "Mgła" (music Włodzimierz Wander, lyrics Jacek Skubikowski)
9. "Ptaki śpiewają - kocham" (music Czesław Niemen, lyrics Włodzimierz Patuszyński)
10. "Czas jak rzeka" (music and lyrics Czesław Niemen)
11. "Kałakolczik" (music Wołkow, lyrics M. Makarow)
12. "Jak można wierzyć tylko słowom" (music Czesław Niemen, lyrics Marta Bellan)
13. "Czy wiesz o tym, że" (music Czesław Niemen, lyrics Marek Gaszyński)
14. "Przyjdź w taką noc" (music Mateusz Święcicki, lyrics Krzysztof Dzikowski)
