= Marionetki =

Niemen Vol. 1

Studio album by Czesław Niemen
- Released: 1973
- Genre: Avant-garde jazz; progressive rock; experimental music; art rock
- Length: 36:35
- Label: Polskie Nagrania Muza

Volume 1
Review scores
Source	Rating
Teraz Rock	(3/2004) link

Niemen Vol. 1 and Niemen Vol. 2 (also called "Marionetki" - "Puppets") - Czesław Niemen's double album released in two separate issues in 1973. In 1994 released on single CD by Digiton under title "Marionetki".

== Niemen Vol. 1 ==
=== Track listing ===
1. Requiem dla Van Gogha - 17:37 (music and lyrics Helmut Nadolski)
2. Sariusz - 3:06 (lyrics Cyprian Kamil Norwid)
3. Inicjały - 12:53 (instrumental, music by all band members)

=== Personnel ===
- Józef Skrzek - organ, piano, violin, bass, harmonica, vocal
- Jerzy Piotrowski - drums
- Antymos Apostolis - guitar
- Helmut Nadolski - double bass
- Andrzej Przybielski - trumpet
- Czesław Niemen - organ, piano, vocal

== Niemen Vol. 2 ==
Niemen Vol. 2

Studio album by Czesław Niemen
- Released: 1973
- Genre: Avant-garde jazz Progressive rock Experimental music Art rock
- Length: 36:03
- Label: Polskie Nagrania Muza (LP)

Czesław Niemen chronology
Ode to Venus (1973)	Niemen Vol. 2 (1973)	Russische Lieder (1973)

Volume 2
Review scores
Source	Rating
Teraz Rock	(3/2004) link

=== Track listing ===
1. Marionetki - 4:10 (lyrics Cyprian Kamil Norwid)
2. Piosenka dla zmarłej - 13:49 (lyrics Jarosław Iwaszkiewicz)
3. Z pierwszych ważniejszych odkryć - 9:17 (music Józef Skrzek, lyrics Leszek Aleksander Moczulski)
4. Ptaszek - 1:07 (lyrics Maria Pawlikowska-Jasnorzewska)
5. Com uczynił - 7:39 (lyrics Bolesław Leśmian)

=== Personnel ===
- Józef Skrzek - organ, piano, violin, bass, harmonica, vocal
- Jerzy Piotrowski - drums
- Antymos Apostolis - guitar
- Helmut Nadolski - double bass
- Andrzej Przybielski - trumpet
- Czesław Niemen - organ, piano, vocal

== Alternative covers ==
1994 Digiton CD reissue

2003 Polskie Radio CD reissue
