= Postscriptum (album) =

Studio album by Czesław Niemen
- Released: 1980
- Genre: Electronic
- Length: 40:20; 55:30 (CD reissue)
- Label: Polskie Nagrania Muza (LP); Polskie Radio

Czesław Niemen chronology
The Best of Niemen (1979)	Postscriptum (1980)	Przeprowadzka (1982)

Professional ratings
Review scores
Source	Rating
Teraz Rock	3.5/5 stars

Postscriptum is an album by Czesław Niemen released in 1980. "Dziwny jest ten świat '79" is a new version of Niemen's best known song "Dziwny jest ten świat".

== Track listing ==
1. "Dziwny jest ten świat '79" – 4:14 (lyrics: Czesław Niemen)
2. "Pokój" – 4:42 (lyrics: Sergiusz Michałkow)
3. "Nim przyjdzie wiosna" – 5:15 (lyrics: Jarosław Iwaszkiewicz)
4. "Elegia śnieżna" – 6:02 (lyrics: Jan Brzechwa)
5. "Moje zapatrzenie" – 6:10 (lyrics: Czesław Niemen)
6. "Serdeczna muza" – 3:23 (lyrics: Czesław Niemen)
7. "Żyć przeciw wojnie" – 7:24 (instrumental)
8. "Postscriptum" – 2:52 (lyrics: Czesław Niemen)
9. "Panflutronik (wymarsz na wczasy)" – 3:13 (instrumental, 2007 CD reissue bonus)
10. "Wakacje 1939" – 12:12 (instrumental, 2007 CD reissue bonus)

== Personnel ==
- Czesław Niemen – vocal, keyboards, moog
