= The Best of Niemen =

Greatest hits album by Czesław Niemen
- Released: 1979
- Recorded: 1966–1969
- Genre: Soul; rock
- Length: 45:20 (LP)
- Label: Polskie Nagrania Muza

Czesław Niemen chronology
Idée Fixe (1978)	The Best of Niemen (1979)	Postscriptum (1980)

Professional ratings
Review scores
Source	Rating
Teraz Rock	(3/2004) link

The Best of Niemen is a compilation of Czesław Niemen's greatest hits released between 1966 and 1969.

== Track listing ==
1. "Pod papugami" - 3:15 (music Mateusz Święcicki, lyrics Bogusław Choiński, Jan Gałkowski)
2. "Wspomnienie" - 3:50 (music Marek Sart, lyrics Julian Tuwim)
3. "Baw się w ciuciubabkę" - 3:05 (music Czesław Niemen, lyrics Jacek Grań)
4. "Płonąca stodoła" - 2:30 (music Czesław Niemen, lyrics Marta Bellan)
5. "Sen o Warszawie" - 3:20 (music Czesław Niemen, lyrics Marek Gaszyński)
6. "Czy wiesz" - 2:30 (music Czesław Niemen, lyrics Marek Gaszyński)
7. "Spiżowy krzyk" - 2:15 (music Czesław Niemen, lyrics Czesław Niemczuk)
8. "Nie wiem czy warto" - 4:15 (music Zbigniew Bizoń, lyrics Krzysztof Dzikowski)
9. "Przyjdź w taką noc" - 2:15 (music Mateusz Święcicki, lyrics Krzysztof Dzikowski)
10. "Włóczęga" - 2:30 (traditional with lyrics by Marta Bellan)
11. "Jeszcze sen" - 2:15 (music Czesław Niemen, lyrics Marta Bellan)
12. "Jeżeli" - 3:20 (music Czesław Niemen, lyrics Julian Tuwim)
13. "Domek bez adresu" - 2:25 (music Andrzej Korzyński, lyrics Andrzej Tylczyński)
14. "Dziwny jest ten świat" - 3:35 (music Czesław Niemen, lyrics Czesław Niemen)
