= Czy mnie jeszcze pamiętasz? =

Studio album by Czesław Niemen
- Released: 1969
- Genre: Soul; rock
- Length: 34:44 (LP)
- Label: Polskie Nagrania Muza (LP)

Czesław Niemen chronology
Sukces (1968)	Czy mnie jeszcze pamiętasz? (1969)	Enigmatic (1970)

Professional ratings
Review scores
Source	Rating
Teraz Rock	3.5/5 stars

Czy mnie jeszcze pamiętasz? ("Do You Remember Me?") is Czesław Niemen's third solo album, released in 1969. It was his last album recorded with Akwarele.

== Track listing ==
1. "Wiem, że nie wrócisz" ("I know you won't return) – 3:56 (music: Czesław Niemen, lyrics: Jacek Grań)
2. "Baw się w ciuciubabkę" ("Let's play blind-man's bluff") – 3:03 (music: Niemen, lyrics: Grań)
3. "Obok nas" ("Besides us") – 3:16 (music: Wojciech Piętowski, lyrics: Janusz Odrowąż)
4. "Nie wiem czy to warto" ("I don't know if it's worth loving you") – 4:16 (music: Zbigniew Bizoń, lyrics: Krzysztof Dzikowski)
5. "Przyjdź w taką noc" ("Come in such a night") – 2:16 (music: Mateusz Święcicki, lyrics: Dzikowski)
6. "Czy mnie jeszcze pamiętasz?" ("Do you remember me?") – 3:30 (music: Niemen, lyrics: Grań)
7. "Pod papugami" ("Under parrots") – 3:20 (music: Święcicki, lyrics: Bogusław Choiński, Jan Gałkowski)
8. "Jeszcze sen" ("Still a dream") – 2:45 (music: Niemen, lyrics: Marta Bellan)
9. "Stoję w oknie" ("I'm standing in the window") – 3:12 (music: Niemen, lyrics: Edward Fiszer)
10. "Czas jak rzeka" ("Time flows like a river") – 2:38 (Niemen)
11. "Ach, jakie oczy" ("Oh, what eyes") – 2:32 (Niemen)

== Personnel ==
- Czesław Niemen – vocal, organ
- Zbigniew Sztyc – tenor saxophone
- Tomasz Buttowtt – drums
- Tomasz Jaśkiewicz – guitar
- Ryszard Podgórski – trumpet
- Marian Zimiński – piano, organ
- Tadeusz Gogosz – bass
- Partita - background vocals
