= Niemen (album) =

Studio album by Czesław Niemen
- Released: 1971
- Genre: Progressive rock, jazz rock
- Length: 74:33
- Label: Polskie Nagrania Muza (LP)
- Producer: Zofia Gajewska

Czesław Niemen chronology
Enigmatic (1970)	Niemen (1971)	Strange Is This World (1972)

Professional ratings
Review scores
Source	Rating
Teraz Rock	4/5 stars

Niemen (also known as "Człowiek jam niewdzięczny" - "Ungrateful Man I Am" or "Czerwony Album" - "The Red Album") is double LP album by Czesław Niemen released in 1971. It was another step towards Niemen's embrace of progressive rock and avant-garde music.

== Track listing ==
1. "Człowiek jam niewdzięczny" - 20:32 (lyrics Czesław Niemen)
2. "Aerumnarum Plenus" - 7:35 (lyrics Cyprian Kamil Norwid)
3. "Italiam, Italiam" - 4:58 (lyrics Cyprian Kamil Norwid)
4. "Enigmatyczne impresje" - 7:27 (instrumental)
5. "Nie jesteś moja" - 8:15 (lyrics Czesław Niemen)
6. "Wróć jeszcze dziś" - 3:47 (lyrics Wojciech Młynarski)
7. "Mój pejzaż" - 5:13 (lyrics Marta Bellan)
8. "Sprzedaj mnie wiatrowi" - 4:27 (lyrics Ryszard Marek Groński)
9. "Zechcesz mnie, zechcesz" - 3:34 (lyrics Wojciech Młynarski)
10. "Chwila ciszy" - 5:01 (lyrics Wojciech Młynarski)
11. "Muzyko moja" - 3:54 (lyrics Wojciech Młynarski)

== Personnel ==
- Jacek Mikuła - Hammond organ
- Tomasz Jaśkiewicz - guitar
- Janusz Zieliński - bass
- Czesław Bartkowski - drums
- Zbigniew Namysłowski - alto saxophone
- Janusz Stefański - percussion
- Czesław Niemen - vocal, flute
- Krystyna Prońko, Zofia Borca, Elżbieta Linkowska - background vocals
- Partita - background vocals
