= Grzegorz Kaźmierczak =

Polish writer

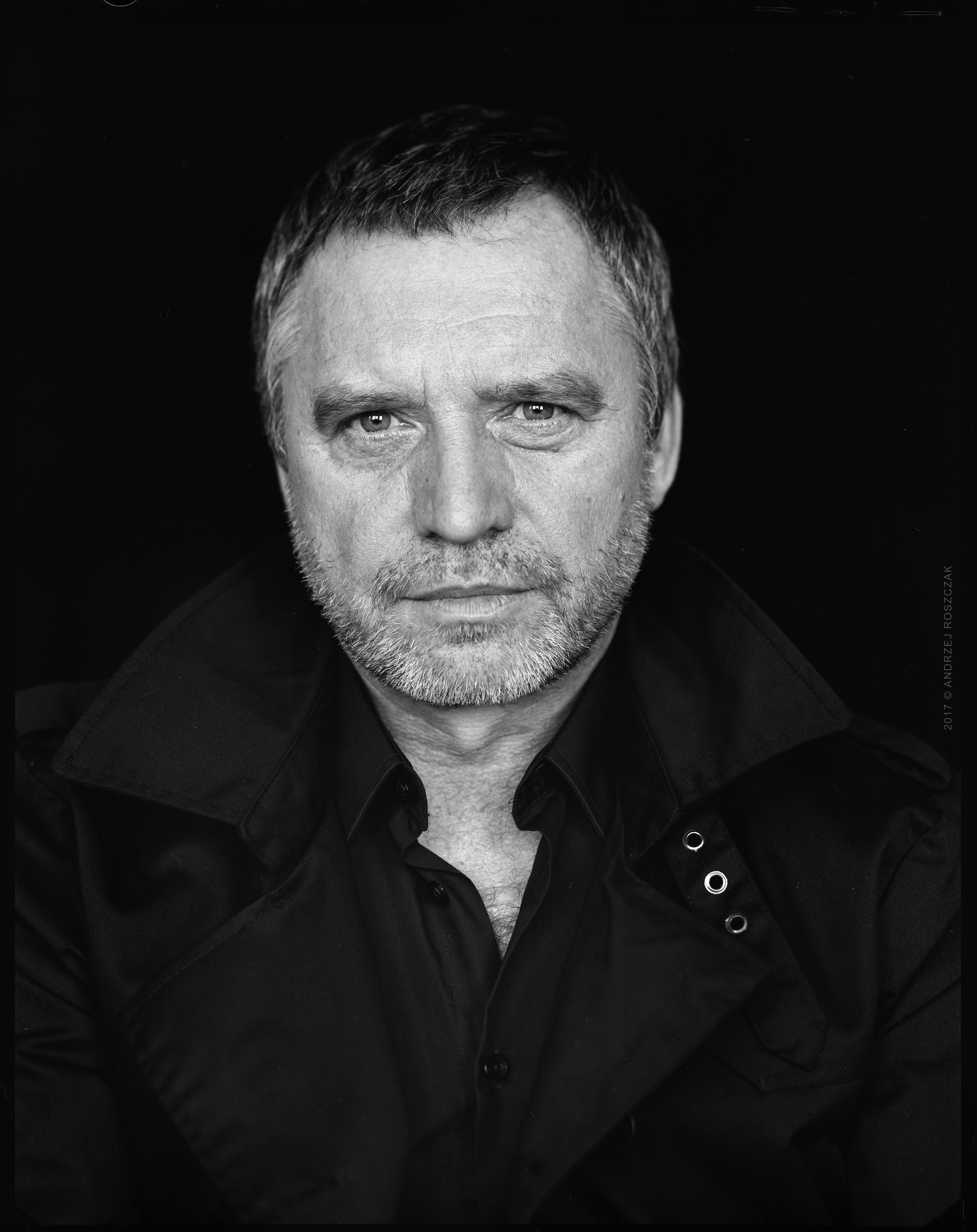

Background information
- Born: 15 February 1964 (age 62); Bydgoszcz, Poland
- Genres: poetry * new wave * jazz * rock * avantgarde
- Occupations: poet; singer-songwriter; musician; sound engineer; record producer
- Website: grzegorzkazmierczak.pl

Grzegorz Kaźmierczak (born 15 February 1964) is a Polish poet, vocalist (and author of lyrics) in the band Variété, and record producer.

== Life and work ==
Graduated from the Polish Philology Department at Kazimierz Wielki University. Co-founded Variété and debuted with the group at Jarocin Festival in 1984, receiving a distinction and several other awards in further years, including the Grand Prize, the Audience Award, the Journalists’ Award and the Award of the President of Jarocin. So far Variété has released 10 longplays and Kaźmierczak has published 4 books of poems. The band has played many concerts in various European countries, in Russia and US. In 2007 Variété recorded their sixth album in New York City.

Kaźmierczak is a co-founder of a few recording studios. As sound engineer and music producer he has participated in recording albums of many artists. He has won various individual and collective awards. In Polish music community Kaźmierczak has been considered one of the best lyricists. In 2010 a documentary „Variété – muzyka bez końca" (Variété – endless music) was made, directed by Darek Landowski. Grzegorz Kaźmierczak currently lives in Avola.

== Bibliography ==
=== Books of poetry ===
- Głód i przesyt (1993)
- Record – play (2003)
- Bydgoszcz – Nowy Jork (2008)
- Centra (2014)

== Discography ==
=== Albums with Variété ===
- Bydgoszcz – MC (Akademickie Radio "Pomorze" 1992) CD (Furia Musica 2002 – re-released as „Bydgoszcz 1986")
- Variété – CD (Kophaus 1993) MC (re-released by Music Corner in 1996)
- Koncert Teatr STU – CD (Music Corner 1995)
- Wieczór przy balustradzie – CD (Music Corner 1996)
- Nowy material – CD (EMI Music Poland 2005)
- Zapach wyjścia – CD (Kuka Records 2008)
- Piosenki kolonistów – CD (2–47 Records 2013)
- PPA Wrocław 2015 – CD (2–47 Records 2015)
- Nie wiem - CD (Agora 2017)
- Dziki książę - CD (Mystic 2021)

=== Singles with Variété ===
- I znowu ktoś przestawił kamienie – single/vinyl (Tonpress 1985)

=== Soundtracks ===
- Hiena, a feature film directed by Grzegorz Lewandowski (2006)
- W poszukiwaniu Człowieka Serca, a documentary by Katarzyna Marcysiak (2016)

=== As author of lyrics in other releases ===
- Strachy na Lachy – "Zakazane piosenki" (2008)
- Biff – "Ano" (2009)
- Maria Nefeli – "Cmentarze"
- Renata Przemyk – "Zamknij wszystkie drzwi"
- Pola Trąbińska – "Klaszcząc w dłonie"
- Pogodno – "Mechanizmy"

=== As producer/co-producer ===
- Fred Frith – "Live" (1999)
- Mazzoll/Niebieski lotnik – "Love Surprise" (2000)
- Pieces of brain – "Crash the car daddy" (2000)
- Kloszard – "Stare wino" (2000)
- Various Artists – "Mózg 5 lat" (2000)
- Janusz Zdunek/4 Syfon – "Baterie" (2001)
- Tortilla Flat – "Po polsku" (2001)
- Kazik – "Piosenki Toma Waitsa" (2003)
- Pieces of brain – "Arythmic Visible Music" (2003)
- Fisz Emade/Tworzywo sztuczne – "Na Rzywo w Mózgu" (2004)
- Dubska – "Koncert w Mózgu" (2004)
- Nol – "Nol" (2004)
- Charlie sleeps – "T." (2004)
- 3mooboys – "3mooboys" (2004)
- Janusz Zdunek/5 Syfon – "Tango" (2004)
- Dubska – "Dubska" (2005)
- Variété – "Nowy material" (2005)
- Iconoclast – "The Dreadfull dance" (2005)
- 3mooboys – "Only music can save us" (2006)
- Potty Umbrella – "All you know is wrong" (2006)
- Various Artists – "Piosenki bydgoskie" (2006)
- Sellisternium – "Furry" (2008)
- Hotel Kosmos -"Wszystkie stare kobiety miasta" (2008)
- Variété – "Zapach wyjścia" (2008)
- Citizen woman there – "Pleasure, pleasure" (2009)
- Andrzej Przybielski – "Sesja open" (2011)
- Organizm – "Koniec, początek, powidok" (2011)
- Variété – "Piosenki kolonistów" (2013)
- Variété – "PPA Wrocław" (2015)
- The Shipyard – "Niebieska linia" (2015)
- Vienio – "Hore" (2016)
- Ms. Obsession - Manekin (2017)
- Variété - Nie wiem (2017)
- Variete - Dziki książę (2021)

== Awards ==
- Jarocin Festival 1984: distinction (with Variété)
- Jarocin Festival 1985: the grand prize "Złota Dziesiątka" (Golden Ten) (with Variété)
- Festiwal Piosenki Autorskiej Warszawa-Hybrydy 1987: distinction (with Wina)
- Jarocin Festival 1992: the Journalists’ Award, the Audience Award and the Award of the President of Jarocin (with Variété)
- Award of Polish Music Lovers for 2008 in the category "Album of the Year – New Wave/Synth Pop/Cold Wave" for the album "Zapach wyjścia" (with Variété)
- Nomination for the Fryderyk 2022 award, in the category of album/literary and poetic music for the album "Wild Prince" (with Variete)
