= Przeprowadzka =

Soundtrack album by Czesław Niemen
- Released: 1982
- Recorded: 1980–1982
- Genre: Film music
- Label: Rogot

Czesław Niemen chronology
Postscriptum (1980)	Przeprowadzka (1982)	Terra Deflorata (1989)

Przeprowadzka ("Moving") - album by Czesław Niemen released on compact cassette in 1982. It contains music recorded for Janusz Łęski's films "Rodzina Leśniewskich" ("Leśniewski Family"), "Kłusownik" ("The Poacher") and "Przygrywka" ("Playing up"). Never released on CD or LP.

== Track listing ==
1. "Temat rodzinny"
2. "Wszystkim ludziom co do pracy spieszą" (lyrics Wojciech Młynarski)
3. "Bąble"
4. "Kwiaty dla mamy cz. I i II"
5. "Dobranoc"
6. "Rozmowy"
7. "Bąble w ZOO"
8. "Koledzy - rywale"
9. "Zaloty"
10. "Bieg z przeszkodami"
11. "Slalom"
12. "Zachwyt"
13. "Marzenie"
14. "Przed Wigilią"
15. "Kolęda rodzinna" (lyrics Wojciech Młynarski)
16. "Bąble w cyrku"
17. "Piękna woltyżerka"
18. "Witaj przygodo zielona" (lyrics Wojciech Młynarski)
19. "Dom cz. I i II"
20. "Mały włóczęga"
21. "Stare ścieżki"
22. "Nieznajomy młokos"
23. "Ucieczka w nieznane"
24. "Przygrywka" (lyrics Wojciech Młynarski)

== Personnel ==
- Czesław Niemen - keyboards, vocal (track 18)
- Children choir under direction of W. Seredyński - (tracks 2, 15)
- Gawęda under direction of A. Kieruzalski - (track 24)
