= Vosyliškės =

Vosyliškės may refer to the following places in Lithuania, current or former:

- Vasilishki, now in Belarus
- Vosyliškės, Kaišiadorys, Kaišiadorys District Municipality
- Vosyliškės, Ignalina, Ignalina District Municipality

== See also ==
- Vosyliškė
