= Strange Is This World =

Studio album by Czesław Niemen
- Released: 1972
- Genre: Experimental rock
- Length: 39:26
- Label: CBS (LP)

Czesław Niemen chronology
Niemen (1971)	Strange Is This World (1972)	Ode to Venus (1973)

Professional ratings
Review scores
Source	Rating
Teraz Rock	(3/2004) link

Strange Is This World is the first English-language album by Polish rock artist Niemen. The album was released in 1972 in West Germany on the CBS Records International (the European section of Columbia Records).

"I've wanted to introduce something new, original to rock music."

— Czesław Niemen

== Track listing ==
1. "Strange Is This World" – 6:05 - (lyrics: Czesław Niemen)
2. "Why Did You Stop Loving Me" – 12:05 (lyrics: Marek Rymaszewski & Paweł Brodowski) [1]
3. "I've Been Loving You Too Long" – 4:13 (music: Otis Redding, lyrics Jerry Butler)
4. "A Song For The Deceased" – 13:18 (lyrics: Jarosław Iwaszkiewicz, translation: Paweł Brodowski)

[1] Lyric writers on 'Why Did You Stop Loving Me' as printed on the label of the vinyl version of the CBS album, # S 64896

== Personnel ==
- Czesław Niemen – organ, vocal
- Józef Skrzek – piano, bass, organ, harmonica
- Helmut Nadolski – double bass
- Antymos Apostolis – guitar
- Jerzy Piotrowski – drums
