= Terra Deflorata =

Studio album by Czesław Niemen
- Released: 1989
- Genre: Electronic
- Length: 38:30 (LP); 55:29 (CD)
- Labels: Veriton (LP); Polton (CD)

Czesław Niemen chronology
Przeprowadzka (1982)	Terra Deflorata (1989)	Gwiazdy mocnego uderzenia: Czesław Niemen (1991)

Alternative covers
- 1993 CD Reissue

Professional ratings
Review scores
Source	Rating
Teraz Rock	4/5 stars

Terra Deflorata is an album by Czesław Niemen released in 1989 and re-released in 1991 on CD as an extended version.

== Track listing ==
All lyrics written by Czesław Niemen.

No.	Title	Length
1.	"Spojrzenie za siebie"	7:14
2.	"Klaustrofobia"	5:36
3.	"Status mojego ja"	5:35
4.	"Zezowata bieda"	4:44
5.	"Terra Deflorata"	6:50
6.	"Unisono (Na pomieszane języki)"	1:24
7.	"Począwszy od Kaina"	7:06

=== Extended version (1991 CD reissue) ===
No.	Title	Length
1.	"Pantheon" (new track)	5:35
2.	"Spojrzenie za siebie"	7:16
3.	"Klaustrofobia"	5:34
4.	"Status mojego ja"	5:34
5.	"Alter Ego" (new track)	3:33
6.	"Blue Community" (new track)	7:43
7.	"Zezowata bieda"	4:45
8.	"Terra Deflorata"	6:54
9.	"Unisono (Na pomieszanie języki)"	1:27
10.	"Począwszy od Kaina"	7:08

== Personnel ==
- Czesław Niemen – vocal, synthesizers, Linn LM-1 Drum Computer
