= Variété =

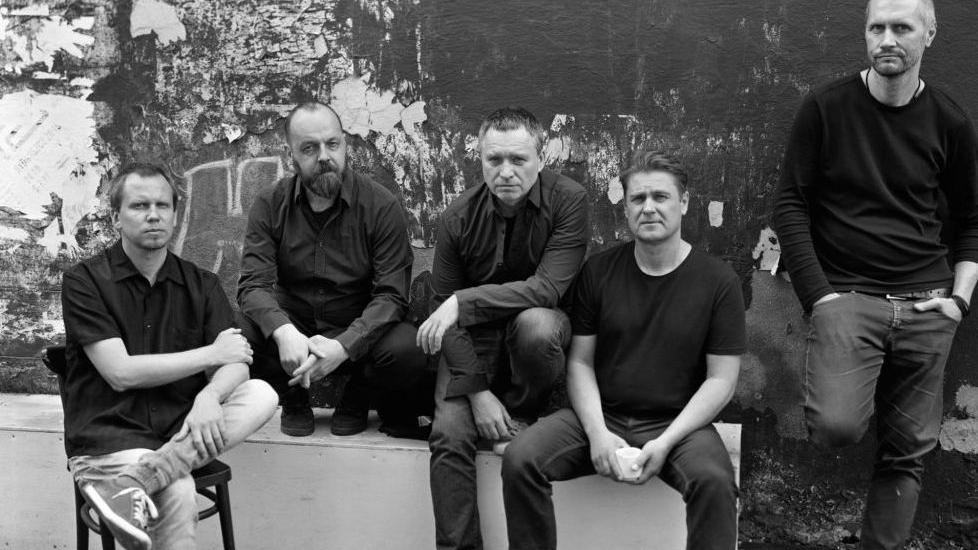

Background information
- Origin: Bydgoszcz, Poland
- Genres: New wave, cold wave, jazz, rock, avant-garde, trip-hop
- Years active: 1983–present
- Labels: Klub Płytowy Razem, Tonpress, Kophaus, MusicCorner, Furia Musica, EMI Music Poland, Kuka Records, 247Records
- Members: Grzegorz Kaźmierczak; Marek Maciejewski; Marcin Karnowski; Grzegorz Korybalski; Bartek Gasiul
- Past members: Wojtek Woźniak; Tomasz Dorn; Sławomir Abramowicz; Radek Urbański; Jacek Buhl; Jarek Hejmann; Tomasz Krzemiński
- Website: http://variete.serpent.pl

Variété is a new-wave and cold-wave band from Poland, considered the leading pioneers of that genre in 1980s. The group is continually evolving and their music can be now described as an original blend of jazz, minimal and trip-hop.

== History ==
=== 1980s ===
The band was founded in autumn 1983 as ZyZyZy which was later changed into Variété Est Morte (from French “Diversity is dead”) and then shortened into Variété. The original lineup featured Grzegorz Kaźmierczak (vocalist, author of lyrics), Wojciech Woźniak (bass guitar), Jacek Buhl (drums), Radosław Urbański (guitar) and Sławomir Abramowicz (saxophone). Variété made their debut at Jarocin Festival in 1984 where they received an award, presenting coldwave music enriched with Kaźmierczak's poetry. The group appeared again on the Jarocin stage in 1985 (Main Prize – The Golden Ten), 1986 (headliner), 1990, 1991, 1992 (Award of the Town Mayor) and 1994.

In 1985, Variété went into the studio to record two tracks for their debut single "I znowu ktoś przestawił kamienie”. In 1986 the band recorded 10 songs for their first longplay with the working title Bydgoszcz. A day before the band was about to sign a contract with a record label (Klub Płytowy “Razem”), the master tape had been stolen from the car. It hasn't been found to this day. Only poor quality copies of the record circulated unofficially in Poland, one of which was released in 1992 by University Radio Pomorze. The album was officially released on compact disc as Bydgoszcz 1986 only in 2002 by Furia Musica.

The concert in Jarocin’86 was recorded by the BBC film crew who at that time was shooting a documentary My Blood, Your Blood. However, due to poor stage lighting the recorded scenes were not included in the final version of the film.

A year later the band suspended their activity to resume it after a few months in the following lineup: Kaźmierczak – Woźniak – Buhl. In 1988 Kaźmierczak and Woźniak formed a duo WINA to receive an award at the Stage Songs Review held at the Hybrydy Club in Warsaw. As winners they qualified to perform at the Student Songs Festival in Cracow, however, they decided not to take that opportunity as they didn't consider the festival a suitable event for them.

=== 1990s ===
Radek Urbański joined the band as guitarist a year later, and in 1990 he was replaced by Marek Maciejewski who has been playing guitar since. In 1989 Tomasz "Perełka” Dorn, known from Abaddon, took place of Jacek Buhl. That lineup recorded a self-titled album – Variété (Kophaus, 1993) which brought a partial change in style. Some elements of jazz appeared on the record, mainly thanks to a legendary trumpeter Andrzej Przybielski whom the band had invited to the recording session. In the following years the band released two albums: Koncert Teatr STU (MusicCorner, 1995) – a live album recorded in Cracow in 1994, this time with participation of another eminent figure in the Polish Jazz scene – Mikołaj Trzaska, and a studio album entitled Wieczór przy balustradzie (MusicCorner, 1996).

=== 2000s ===
In 2001 Variété started rehearsing with a new drummer – Jarek Hejmann, known from the band Dubska. Nowy Material (EMI Music Poland, 2005) was released in 2005. One of the co-founders of Variété – Wojtek Woźniak – left the band in 2006. He was replaced by Tomasz Krzemiński (Neuma). In the fall of 2006 Kaźmierczak and Maciejewski went to New York. During their 6 months stay in USA, together with Luigi Franceschini on drums and Donald Dixon on bass guitar they recorded Zapach Wyjścia. The album was released in 2008 by independent Warsaw-based label Kuka Records.

=== 2010s ===
In 2011, Marcin Karnowski, a drummer known from 3moonboys and George Dorn Screams, joined Kaźmierczak and Maciejewski, and Variété started rehearsing as a trio. This lineup recorded Piosenki Kolonistów (247Records, 2013) which enjoyed an enthusiastic reception. After release of the album, keyboardist Bartek Gasiul and bassist Grzegorz Korybalski joined the band.

In 2015, choreographer Jacek Gębura directed a dance and music performance entitled “The Ball, or Get-Together. Variété plays” which had its premiere at the Stage Songs Review in Wrocław. In the same year, an album which is a recording of that performance, entitled PPA Wrocław 2015 (247Records, 2015), was released. The spectacle has been successfully staged until today, mainly at theatre festivals. The band's most recent studio album entitled "Nie wiem" was released in 2017.

In making of the last few albums, Variété have developed their own approach to recording new material. Musicians meet in a studio for a few hours to record every track of every instrument, then they select the fragments that stand out to them and build their songs based on those fragments.

Although Variété is considered by many as a leading representative of cold wave, in his current remarks Grzegorz Kaźmierczak emphasizes the necessity of departing from that genre as a prerequisite of progress. At the same time Variété is seen by a lot of musicians as a band that shaped their musical and literary awareness, a group that continues to inspire.

== Discography ==
=== Albums ===
- Bydgoszcz – MC (Akademickie Radio „Pomorze”, 1992); CD (Furia Musica, 2002 – rereleased as Bydgoszcz 1986)
- Variété – CD (Kophaus, 1993), MC (Music Corner, 1996 – re-release)
- Koncert Teatr STU – CD (Music Corner, 1995)
- Wieczór przy balustradzie – CD (Music Corner, 1996)
- Nowy material – CD (EMI Music Poland, 2005)
- Zapach wyjścia – CD (Kuka Records, 2008)
- Piosenki kolonistów – CD (247 Records, 2013)
- PPA Wrocław 2015 – CD (247 Records, 2015)
- Nie wiem – CD (Agora, 2017)
- Dziki książę – CD (Mystic Production, 2021)
- Sieć Indry – CD (Mystic Production, 2025)

=== Singles ===
- I znowu ktoś przestawił kamienie – SP (Tonpress, 1985)

=== Compilations ===
- Polish New Wave – CD (Mathaus Records, 1997), songs: "I znowu ktoś przestawił kamienie” and "Te dni"

The discography is supplemented by a demo cassette Nothing, distributed by the band in 1984.
