= Sukces =

Studio album by Czesław Niemen
- Released: 1968
- Genre: Soul; rock
- Length: 33:52
- Label: Polskie Nagrania Muza (LP)

Czesław Niemen chronology
Dziwny jest ten świat (1967)	Sukces (1968)	Czy mnie jeszcze pamiętasz? (1969)

Professional ratings
Review scores
Source	Rating
Teraz Rock	3.5/5 stars

Sukces ("Success") is Czesław Niemen's second solo album, released in 1968. The album was recorded with the band Akwarele.

== Track listing ==
1. "Płonąca stodoła" – 2:32 (music Czesław Niemen, lyrics Marta Bellan)
2. "Gdzie się mak czerwieni" – 2:42 (music Czesław Niemen, lyrics Andrzej Tylczyński)
3. "Włóczęga" – 2:32 (music Czesław Niemen, lyrics Marta Bellan)
4. "Narodziny miłości" – 2:37 (music Czesław Niemen, lyrics Marek Gaszyński)
5. "Allilah" – 2:50 (music Czesław Niemen, lyrics Marek Gaszyński)
6. "Najdłuższa noc" – 2:07 (music Czesław Niemen, lyrics Marta Bellan)
7. "Sukces" – 3:14 (music and lyrics Czesław Niemen)
8. "Jeżeli" – 2:23 (music Czesław Niemen, lyrics Julian Tuwim)
9. "Spiżowy krzyk" – 2:14 (music Czesław Niemen, lyrics Czesław Niemczuk)
10. "Tyle jest dróg" – 3:32 (music Czesław Niemen, lyrics Piotr Janczerski)
11. "Niepotrzebni" – 2:48 (music Marian Zimiński, lyrics Marek Gaszyński)
12. "Klęcząc przed Tobą" – 3:19 (music Czesław Niemen, lyrics Marek Gaszyński)

== Personnel ==
- Czesław Niemen – vocal, organ
- Zbigniew Sztyc – tenor saxophone
- Tomasz Buttowtt – drums
- Tomasz Jaśkiewicz – guitar
- Ryszard Podgórski – trumpet
- Marian Zimiński – piano, organ
- Tadeusz Gogosz – bass
