= Russische Lieder =

Studio album by Czesław Niemen
- Released: 1973
- Genre: Folk; folk rock
- Length: 36:08
- Label: CBS (LP)

Czesław Niemen chronology
Niemen Vol. 1 and Niemen Vol. 2 (1973)	Russische Lieder (1973)	Mourner's Rhapsody (1974)

Professional ratings
Review scores
Source	Rating
Teraz Rock	3.5/5

Russische Lieder is Niemen's Russian-language album, recorded in 1973 and released in West Germany by CBS (European section of Columbia Records). The album contains traditional Russian songs.

"Russian folklore is very close to me. After all, I sung those songs in my childhood."

— Czesław Niemen about Russische Lieder

== Track listing ==
1. "Stiep da stiep krugom" – 4:19
2. "Ty pojdi moja korowuszka damoj" – 1:30
3. "Odnozwuczno gremit kolokolczik" – 3:44
4. "Wychozu odin ja na dorogu" – 5:24
5. "Joloczki sosionoczki" – 2:10
6. "Cziornyje browi, karyje oczi" – 4:10
7. "Kolybielnaja" – 3:57
8. "Raskinulos morie sziroko" – 2:00
9. "Po dikim stepiam Zabajkalia" – 3:15
10. "Slawnoje morie, swiaszczennyj Bajkal" – 3:39

== Personnel ==
- Czesław Niemen – vocal, guitar, bass, piano
