= Dziwny jest ten świat =

Studio album by Czesław Niemen
- Released: 1967
- Genre: Soul; rock; big beat
- Length: 36:25
- Label: Polskie Nagrania Muza (LP)

Czesław Niemen chronology
Dziwny jest ten świat (1967)	Sukces (1968)

Professional ratings
Review scores
Source	Rating
Teraz Rock	5/5 stars

Dziwny jest ten świat ("Strange is this World") is Czesław Niemen's first solo album, released in 1967. At 20 December 1968, as first album in Poland, "Dziwny jest ten świat" was awarded with Golden record (160 000 copies sold).

== Track listing ==
- All lyrics and music by Czesław Niemen, except where noted.
1. "Gdzie to jest" – 2:55 (lyrics: Marta Bellan)
2. "Nigdy się nie dowiesz" – 3:30
3. "Ten los, zły los" – 2:40 (lyrics: Krzysztof Dzikowski)
4. "Coś co kocham najwięcej" – 3:05 (lyrics: Jacek Grań)
5. "Wspomnienie" – 3:48 (music: Marek Sart; lyrics: Julian Tuwim)
6. "Nie wstawaj lewą nogą" – 2:12
7. Dziwny jest ten świat (utwór muzyczny) – 3:34
8. "Jeszcze swój egzamin zdasz" – 1:54 (music: Marian Zimiński; lyrics: Marek Gaszyński)
9. "Chciałbym cofnąć czas" – 3:51
10. "Pamiętam ten dzień" – 3:12
11. "Nie dla mnie taka dziewczyna" – 2:27 (lyrics: Grań)
12. "Chyba, że mnie pocałujesz" – 2:57 (lyrics: Grań)
13. "Jaki kolor wybrać chcesz" – 2:22 (music: Marian Zimiński; lyrics: Marek Gaszyński)
14. "Proszę, przebacz" – 3:09 (lyrics: Gaszyński)
15. "Domek bez adresu" – 2:22 (music: Andrzej Korzyński, lyrics: Andrzej Tylczyński)
  - Note that tracks 12–15 only appear on the CD and CC versions as bonus tracks.

"It's a Man's Man's Man's World" and "When a Man Loves a Woman", were inspirations for the titular song "Dziwny jest ten świat".

== Personnel ==
- Czesław Niemen – vocal, piano, organ
- Marian Zimiński – piano, organ
- Tomasz Jaśkiewicz – guitar
- Paweł Brodowski – bass
- Tomasz Butowtt – drums
- Alibabki – background vocals
