= 41 Potencjometrów Pana Jana =

Live album by Czesław Niemen
- Released: 2007
- Recorded: 9 May 1974
- Genre: Progressive rock; jazz rock; experimental rock
- Length: 41:57
- Label: Polskie Radio

Czesław Niemen chronology
| Czas jak rzeka: Złota kolekcja II (2005) | 41 Potencjometrów Pana Jana (2007) | Spiżowy krzyk (2008) |

Professional ratings
Review scores
| Source | Rating |
|---|---|
| Teraz Rock nr 12/07 | 3.5/5 stars |

41 Potencjometrów Pana Jana ("41 Mr. Jan's Potentiometers") is a posthumously released live album by Czesław Niemen. It contains recordings from an improvised concert, performed at the Riviera club, Warsaw, on 9 May 1974 by his "Aerolit" project. The tape, "cut and mixed" by scissors and scotch tape by Niemen himself and Janusz Kosiński, was stored in the archives of Polish Radio.

The full concert was 82 minutes long, but the recording was shortened by Niemen and added to the archives in the late 1970s. The title "41 Potencjometrów Pana Jana" came from the name of Janusz Kosiński (who Niemen referred to as "Jan") who helped edit Niemens material, and the number of minutes of material that they kept from the original concert. (In fact, they had only eight potentiometers).

== Track listing ==
1. "41 Potencjometrów Pana Jana" - 41:57

== Personnel ==
- Czesław Niemen - Mini Moog, Mellotron, vocal
- Jan Błędowski - electric violin
- Piotr Dziemski - drums
- Jacek Gazda - bass
- Sławomir Piwowar - guitar
