= Spodchmurykapelusza =

spodchmurykapelusza

Studio album by Czesław Niemen
- Released: 2001
- Genre: Electronic; experimental
- Length: 46:43 (CD)
- Label: EMI Music Poland

Czesław Niemen chronology
Sen o Warszawie (1995)	spodchmurykapelusza (2001)	od początku I (2002)

spodchmurykapelusza ("From Under the Cloud of a Hat") is the final studio album by Czesław Niemen released in 2001.

== Track listing ==
1. "Spokojnym krokiem" - 3:41
2. "Trąbodzwonnik" - 3:11
3. "Nie wyszeptuj" - 3:10
4. "Śmiech Megalozaura" - 5:25
5. "Jagody szaleju" - 3:50
6. "Pojutrze szary pył" - 3:21
7. "Sonancja" - 4:13
8. "Manhattan '93" - 3:32
9. "Co po nas" - 3:36
10. "Doloniedola" - 4:04
11. "Antropocosmicus" - 4:41
12. "Spodchmurykapelusza" - 4:01

All music and lyrics by Czesław Niemen.

== Personnel ==
- Czesław Niemen - vocal, electronic instruments
