= Staryya Vasilishki =

Village in Grodno Region, Belarus

Staryya Vasilishki Старыя Васілішкі (Belarusian)
- Village
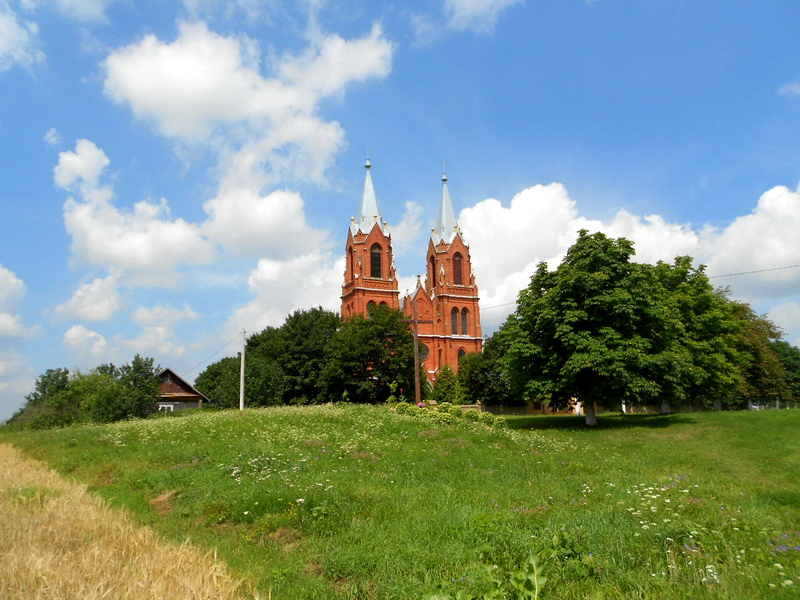

- Location within Belarus
- Coordinates: 53°46′N 24°50′E
- Country: Belarus
- Region: Grodno Region
- District: Shchuchyn District
- Time zone: UTC+3 (MSK)
- Postal code: 231522
- Area code: +375 1514
- License plate: 4

Staryya Vasilishki (Belarusian: Старыя Васілішкі, romanized: Staryja Vasiliški; Russian: Старые Василишки, romanized: Staryye Vasilishki; Polish: Stare Wasiliszki, lit. 'Old Vasilishki') is a village in Shchuchyn District, Grodno Region, Belarus. It is part of Vasilishki rural council (selsoviet).

== History ==
In 1919–1939, Stare Wasiliszki were part of Grodno County, Białystok Voivodeship, Poland. According to the 1921 census, the village had a population of 185, entirely Polish by nationality and Catholic by confession.

== Notable people ==
- Czesław Niemen (1939–2004), Polish singer; his family home was turned into a museum.

== See also ==
- Vasilishki
