= Ode to Venus =

Studio album by Czesław Niemen
- Released: 1973
- Studio: Musicland Studios
- Genre: Experimental rock; art rock
- Length: 41:06
- Label: CBS (LP)
- Producer: Czesław Niemen, Rüdiger Waldmann

Czesław Niemen chronology
Strange Is This World (1972)	Ode to Venus (1973)	Niemen Vol. 1 and Niemen Vol. 2 (1973)

Professional ratings
Review scores
Source	Rating
Teraz Rock	3.5/5 stars

Ode to Venus is the second full-length album recorded by Niemen. It was released in Germany by European part of Columbia, and was created with notable help of Reinhold Mack and SBB.

== Track listing ==
1. "Ode to Venus" - 6:37 (lyrics: Czesław Niemen)
2. "Puppets" - 4:38 (lyrics: Cyprian Kamil Norwid)
3. "From the First Major Discoveries" - 9:33 (lyrics: Leszek Aleksander Moczulski)
4. "What Have I Done" - 5:43 (lyrics: Bolesław Leśmian)
5. "Fly Over Fields of Yellow Sunflowers" - 4:02 (lyrics: Paweł Brodowski)
6. "What a Beautiful Woman You Are" - 4:20 (lyrics: Brodowski)
7. "A Pilgrim" - 4:09 (lyrics: Norwid)
8. "Rock for Mack" - 2:04 (instrumental)
- All Polish to English lyric translations by Paweł Brodowski.

== Personnel ==
- Czesław Niemen - vocal, flute, keyboards
- Józef Skrzek - organ, electric piano, bass, clavinet, harmonica, violin
- Apostolis Anthimos - guitar
- Jerzy Piotrowski - drums
