= Marcin Oleś =

Jazz and free improvisation bass player (born 1973)

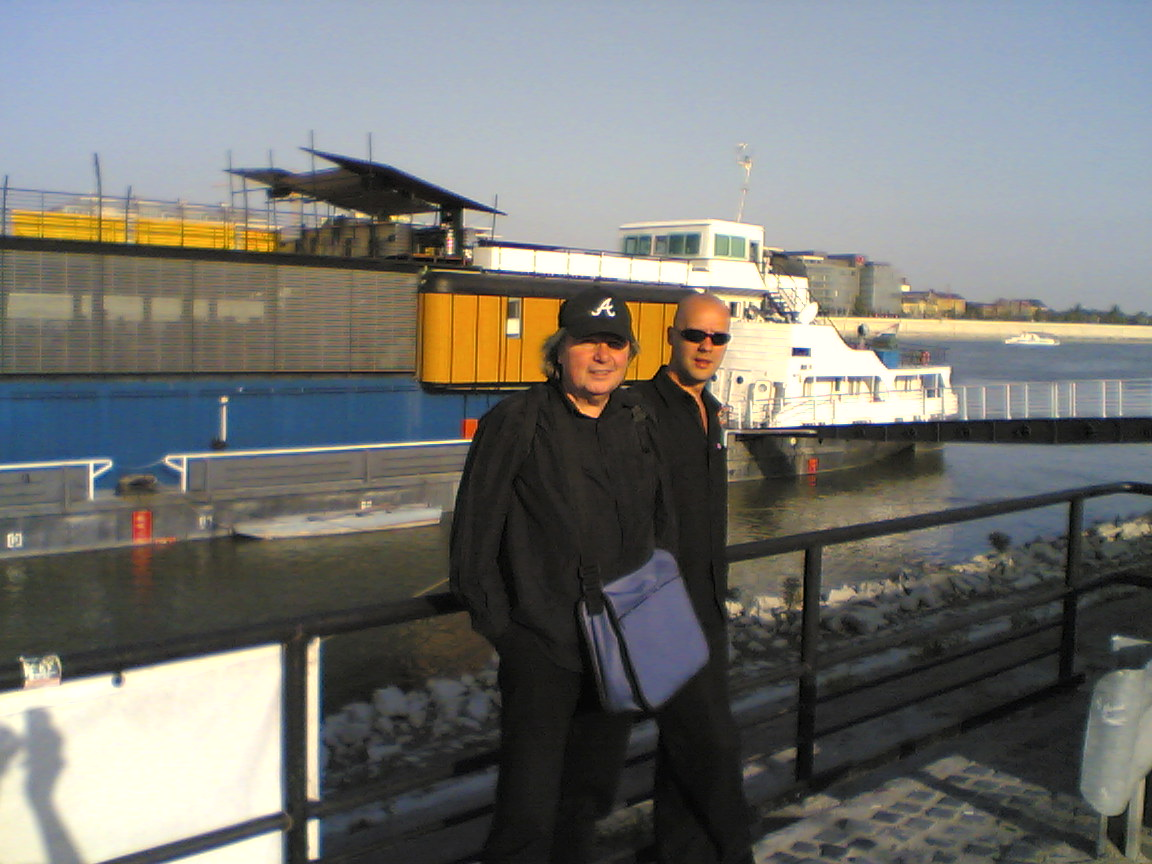
Theo Jörgensmann and Marcin Oles in Budapest, Concert Hall Ship A 38, September 2006

Marcin Oleś (born 4 January 1973) is a jazz and free improvisation bass player, composer and record producer. He is the twin brother of Bartłomiej Oleś.

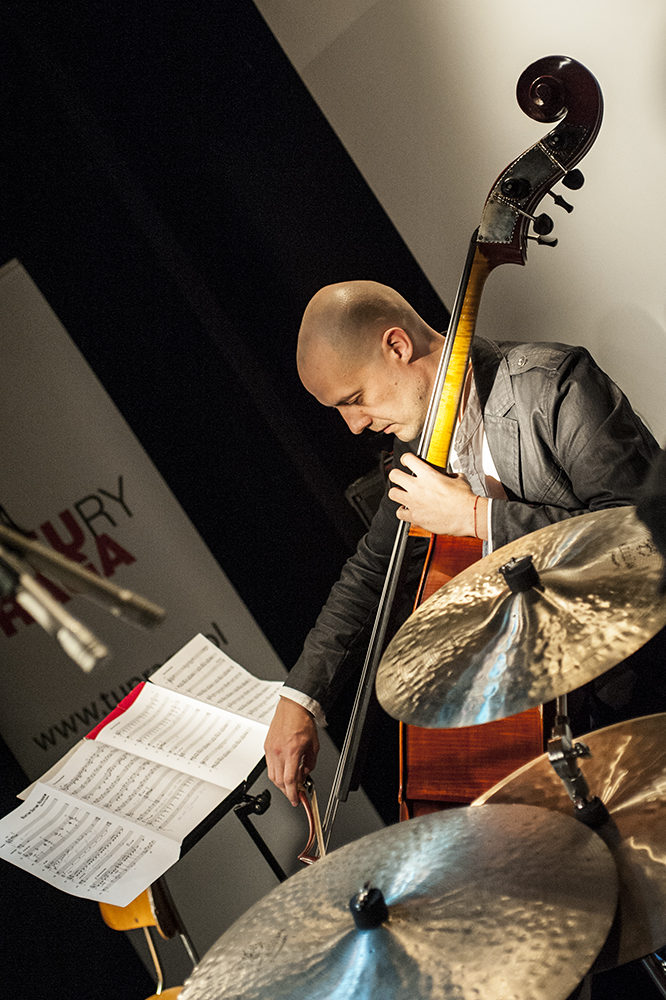
In concert with Christopher Dell, German vibraphonist, and brother Bartłomiej Oleś - drums in Warszawa, Poland in October 2012.

== Biography ==
Oles was born on 4 January 1973 in Sosnowiec, Poland. Since his first recording in 2000 he continuously (with his brother Bartłomiej) cooperated and performed with musicians such as Theo Jörgensmann, David Murray, William Parker, Herb Robertson, Ken Vandermark, Hamid Drake, Chris Speed, Erik Friedlander a.o.

In 2003 Marcin Oles became a founding member of the Trio Oles Jörgensmann Oles with his brother Bartłomiej and German clarinet-player Theo Jörgensmann. The last album of this Trio, titled Directions was voted by internet jazz magazine "Diapazon" from Poland as "The Best Recording Of The Year 2005".

He won the individual prize for bass player and drummer at The International Contest Jazz Juniors 99 in Kraków-Poland (1999). He also won the best double bass player of Jazz Nad Odra in Wrocław-Poland (1999)

== Discography ==
=== As leader ===
- Gray Days with Adam Pieronczyk (Not Two, 2001)
- Mikro Muzik with Mikolaj Trzaska (Kilogram, 2002)
- Plays Music of Bacewicz, Kisielewski, Komsta, Lutoslawski, Penderecki with Mahall, Tiberian, Oles (Not Two, 2002)
- La Sketch Up with Mikolaj Trzaska (Kilogram, 2003)
- Ornette On Bass (Not Two, 2003)
- Miniatures with Theo Jorgensmann & Bartlomiej Oles (Not Two, 2003)
- Abstract with Andrzej Przybielski & Bartlomiej Oles (Not Two, 2005)
- Directions with Bartlomiej Oles (Fenommedia, 2005)
- Chamber Quintet with Bartlomiej Oles (Fenommedia, 2005)
- Walk Songs with Chris Speed, Simon Nabatov, Bartlomiej Oles (Fenommedia, 2006)
- Live in Poznan 2006 with Theo Jorgensmann & Bartlomiej Oles (Fenommedia, 2007)
- Suite for Trio + with Mikolaj Trzaska & Jean-Luc Cappozzo (Fenommedia, 2005)
- Other Voices Other Scenes with Bartlomiej Oles (Fenommedia, 2010)

=== As sideman ===
- David Murray, Circles: Live in Cracow (Not Two, 2003)
- Bartlomiej Oles & Werner, Shadows (Fenommedia, 2006)
- Herb Robertson & Bartlomiej Oles, Live at Alchemia (Not Two, 2007)
- Ken Vandermark, Ideas (Not Two, 2005)
