= Bartłomiej Oleś =

Jazz and free improvisation drummer, composer, and record producer

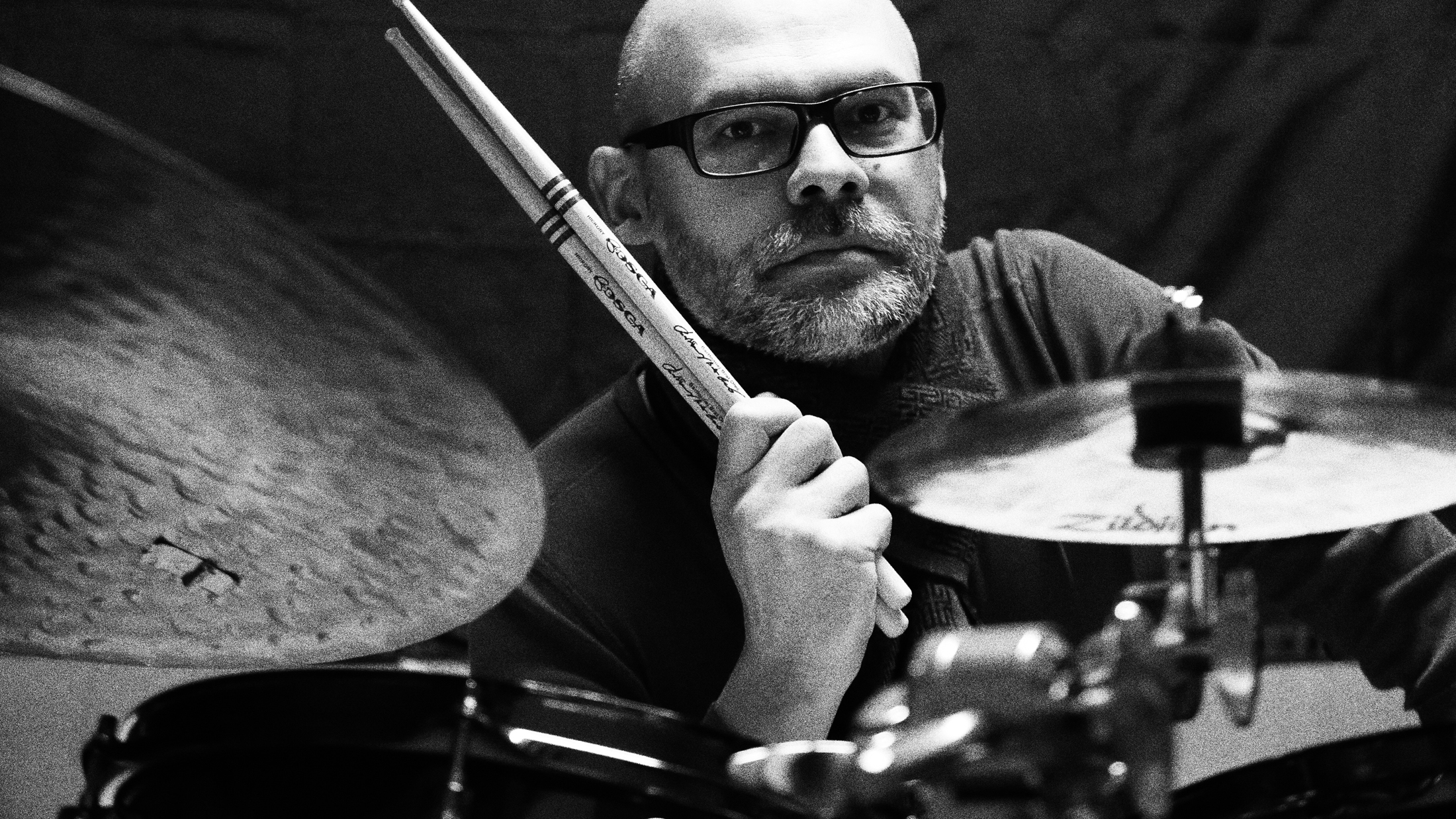
Bartlomiej Oleś

Bartłomiej Oleś (born 4 January 1973) is a jazz and free improvisation drummer, composer and record producer. He is the twin brother of Marcin Oleś and Art-director of the Polish independent Jazz Label Fenommedia.

== Career ==
Bartłomiej Oleś was born on 4 January 1973 in Sosnowiec, Poland. He studied classic percussion at Music High School Łódź. From 1988 he play on drum set. In his career he played with, Kenny Werner, Theo Jörgensmann, David Murray, Erik Friedlander, Chris Speed, Christopher Dell, Herb Robertson, Ken Vandermark, Frank Gratkowski, Simon Nabatov, Jean-Luc Cappozzo, Emmanuelle Somer, Andrzej Przybielski, Mircea Tiberian, Rudi Mahall, Marcin Oleś, Mark Taylor, Anthony Coleman, Adam Pierończyk, Stanley Jordan. Since 2003 he has been a member of the Trio Oles Jörgensmann Oles.

The Trio recorded four albums: Miniatures, Directions (this album was voted by the Polish Internet jazz magazine Diapazon as the "Best Recording of the Year 2005"), Live in Poznan 2006, and Alchemia. His album recorded like leader with great American pianist Kenny Werner was voted as the "Best Recording of the Year 2006" by Polish Radio. In 2007 together with his brother Marcin Oleś he started a project called Oleś Duo. He also composes music for theatre and movie.

== Discography ==
- Oleś Brothers & Christopher Dell Górecki Ahead (Audio Cave 2018)
- Marcin & Bartłomiej Oleś DUO Spirit of Nadir (Audio Cave 2017)
- Oleś Brothers & Antoni Gralak Primitivo (For Tune 2016)
- Oleś Brothers & Theo Jörgensmann Transgression (Słuchaj! 2016)
- Marcin & Bartłomiej Oleś DUO One Step From The Past (Fenommedia 2016)
- Oleś Brothers & Jorgos Skolias SEFARDIX Maggid (Fenommedia 2016)
- Bartłomiej Oleś / Tomasz Dąbrowski Chapters (Fenommedia 2015)
- Oleś Brothers & Christopher Dell Komeda Ahead (Słuchaj! 2014)
- Oleś Brothers & Jorgos Skolias Sefardix (For Tune 2013)
- Andrzej Przybielski / Oleś Brothers De Profundis (Fenommedia 2011)
- Marcin Oleś & Bartłomiej Brat Oleś Other voices, other scenes Theatre & film music (Fenommedia 2010)
- Oleś Brothers with Rob Brown Live at SJC (Fenommedia 2009)
- Marcin & Bartłomiej Brat Oleś DUO (Fenommedia 2008)
- Theo Jorgensmann & Oles Brothers Alchemia (HatHut 2008)
- Herb Robertson Trio + Marcin Oleś & Bartłomiej Brat Oleś Live at Alchemia (NotTwo, 2007)
- Marcin Oleś & Bartłomiej Brat Oleś + Theo Jörgensmann Live in Poznań 2006 (Fenommedia 2007)
- Bartłomiej Brat Oleś Shadows (Fenommedia, 2006)
- Marcin Oleś Walk Songs (Fenommedia, 2006)
- Marcin Oleś & Bartłomiej Brat Oleś Chamber Quintet with Friedlander, Rabinowitz, Somer (Fenommedia, 2005)
- Marcin Oleś & Bartłomiej Brat Oleś + Theo Jörgensmann – Directions (Fenommedia, 2005)
- Oleś / Trzaska / Oleś + Jean-Luc Cappozzo – Suite for trio+ (Fenommedia, 2005)
- Ken Vandermark feat Marcin Oleś & Bartłomiej Brat Oleś – Ideas (NotTwo, 2005)
- Andrzej Przybielski feat Marcin Oleś & Bartłomiej Brat Oleś – Abstract (NotTwo, 2005)
- Bartłomiej Brat Oleś – FreeDrum Suite [drums solo] (NotTwo, 2004)
- David Murray feat Marcin Oleś & Bartłomiej Brat Oleś – Circles – live in Cracow (NotTwo, 2003)
- Marcin Oleś & Bartłomiej Brat Oleś + Theo Jörgensmann – Miniatures (NotTwo, 2003)
- Oleś / Trzaska / Oleś – la SKETCH up (1kg, 2003)
- Oleś / Mahall / Tiberian / Oleś – Contemporary Quartet (NotTwo, 2002)
- Oleś / Trzaska / Oleś – Mikro Muzik (1kg, 2002)
- Custom Trio – Back Point (NotTwo, 2002)
- Oleś / Pieronczyk / Oleś – Gray Days (NotTwo, 2001)
- Custom Trio & Andrzej Przybielski – Free Bop (Polonia, 2000)
- Custom Trio – Mr. Nobody (WM Accord, 1999)

== Gallery ==
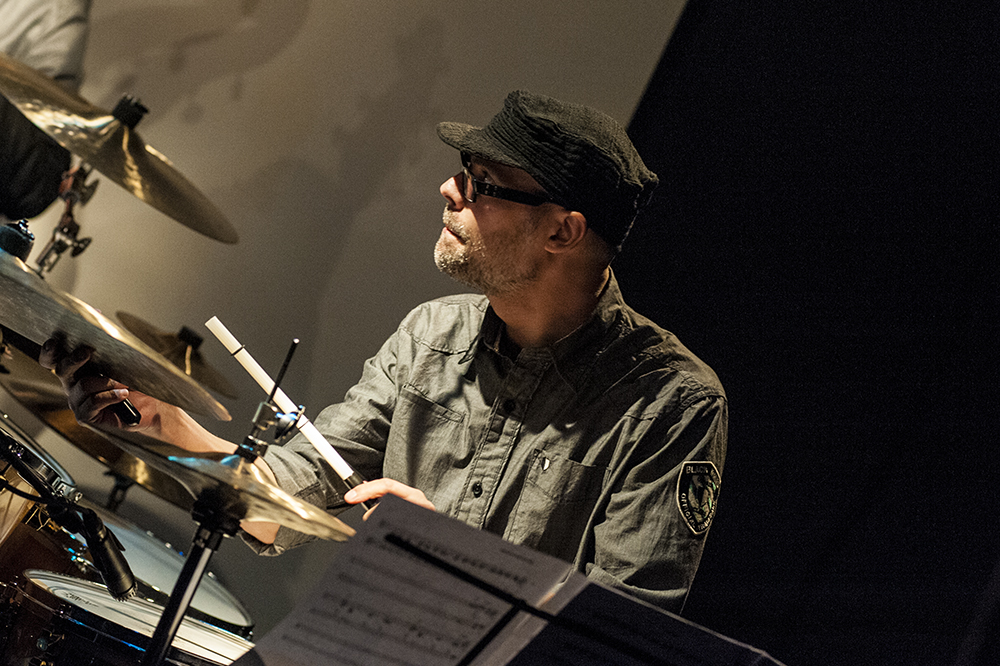
In concert - Warsaw, Poland - October 2012.

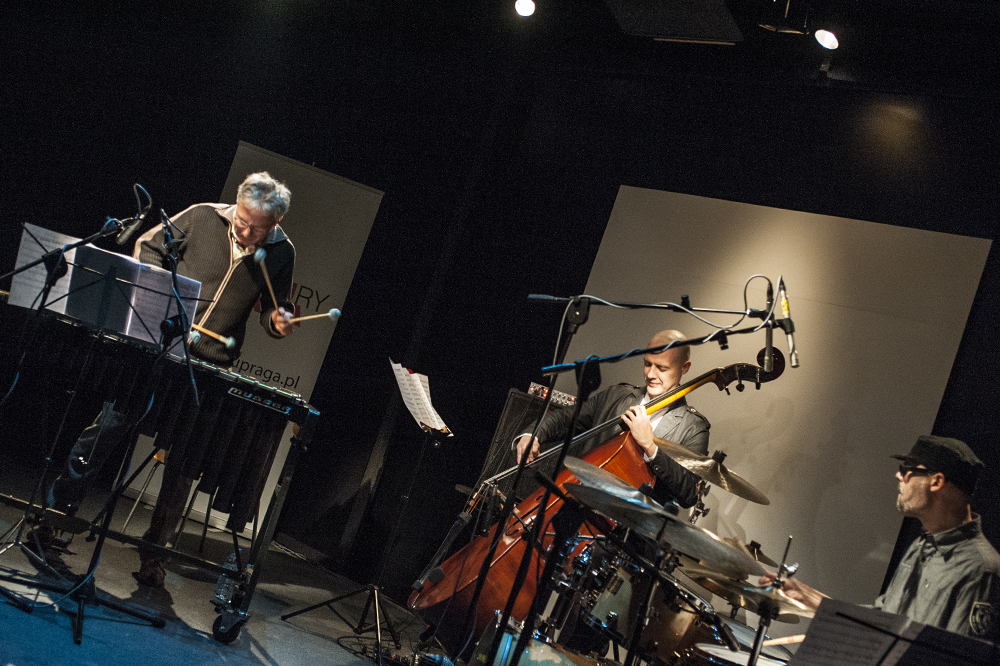
Performing with Christopher Dell - vb and brother Marcin Oleś - db. Warsaw, Poland - October 2012.

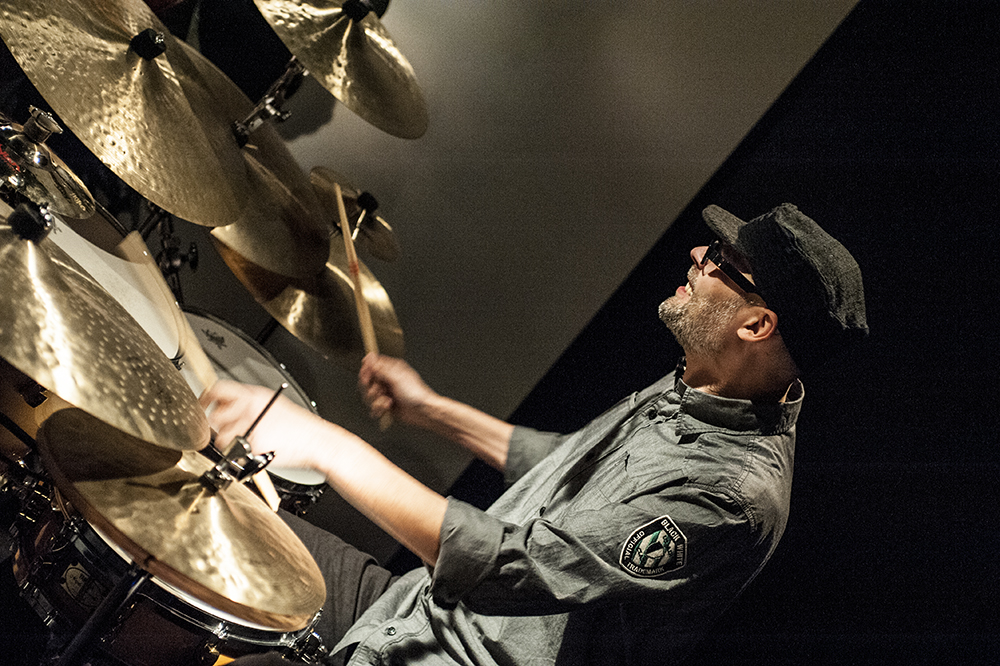

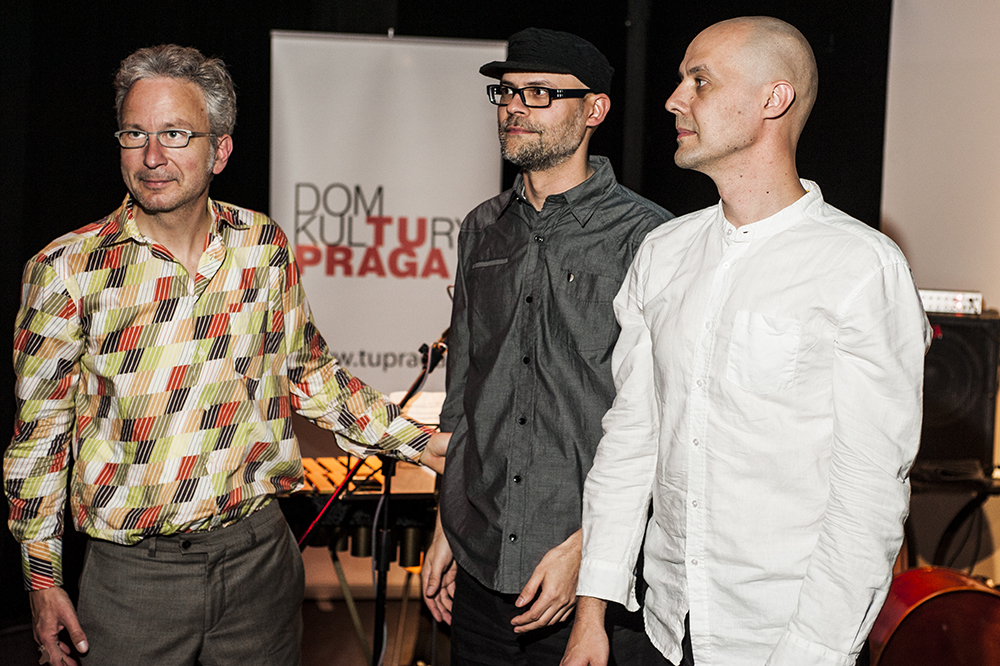
After concert with Christopher Dell and brother Marcin Oleś.
