= Vosyliškė =

Vosyliškė may refer to the following places in Lithuania

- Vosyliškė, Lazdijai, Lazdijai District Municipality
- Vosyliškė, Ignalina, Ignalina District Municipality

== See also ==
- Vosyliškės
