= Sen o Warszawie =

Compilation album by Czesław Niemen
- Released: 1995
- Recorded: 1962–1966
- Genre: Big beat; rock & roll
- Length: 55:44 (CD)
- Label: Polskie Nagrania Muza

Czesław Niemen chronology
Gwiazdy mocnego uderzenia: Czesław Niemen (1991)	Sen o Warszawie (1995)	Spodchmurykapelusza (2001)

Sen o Warszawie ("Dream About Warsaw") is a compilation of Czesław Niemen's first singles. All songs were remastered in 1995.

The song Sen o Warszawie is the anthem of the football club Legia Warszawa, being sung by fans before every match.

== Track listing ==
1. "Adieu Tristesse"
2. "El soldado"
3. "Teach Me How to Twist"
4. "Locomotion"
5. "Tylko nie mów mi o tym"
6. "Wiem, że nie wrócisz"
7. "Czy mnie jeszcze pamiętasz?"
8. "Czas jak rzeka"
9. "Jak można wierzyć tylko słowom"
10. "Ach jakie oczy"
11. "Ptaki śpiewają - kocham"
12. "Nie bądź taki Bitels"
13. "Zabawa w ciuciubabkę"
14. "Hippy Hippy Shake"
15. "Stoję w oknie"
16. "Jeszcze sen"
17. "Czy wiesz o tym że"
18. "Sen o Warszawie"
19. "Być może i ty"
20. "Hej dziewczyno hej"

== Personnel ==
- Jerzy Kossela - guitar
- Krzysztof Klenczon - guitar
- Janusz Popławski- guitar
- Henryk Zomerski - bass
- Zbigniew Bernolak - bass
- Jerzy Kowalski - drums
- Andrzej Nebeski - drums
- Daniel Danielowski - piano
- Zbigniew Pogdajn - piano
- Włodzimierz Wander - tenor saxophone
- Bernard Dornowski, Marek Szczepkowski, Adriana Rusowicz, Maria Wit, Urszula Dziecielska - background vocals
- Czesław Niemen - vocal, harmonica, violin, guitar
