= Niebiesko-Czarni =

Polish rock band

Niebiesko-Czarni (literally: "the Blue-and-Blacks") were one of the most popular Polish big-beat and rock groups of the 1960s and early 1970s. The band was founded by Franciszek Walicki.

Czesław Niemen played in the band for several years.

Throughout their 14 years of history (1962–1976) the Niebiesko-Czarni released 8 longplay discs and 24 singles/fours (over 3.5 million discs) and had over 3000 concerts.
