= Aerolite =

Aerolite may refer to:

- Aerolite, an old term for stony meteorites
- Aero-Works Aerolite 103, an ultralight aircraft
- AeroLites, Inc., an American aircraft manufacturer
- NER 66 Aerolite, a steam locomotive
- Aerolite (adhesive), a wood adhesive
