= Vasilishki =

Agrotown in Grodno Region, Belarus

Vasilishki Васілішкі (Belarusian)
- Agrotown
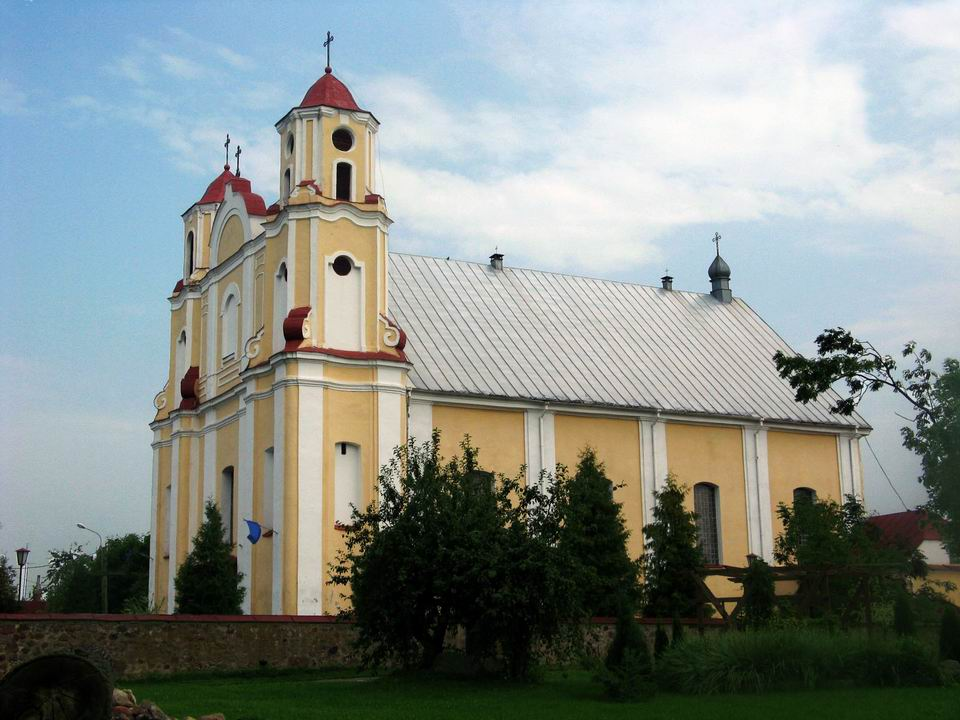

- Location within Belarus
- Coordinates: 53°46′53″N 24°50′52″E
- Country: Belarus
- Region: Grodno Region
- District: Shchuchyn District
- Time zone: UTC+3 (MSK)
- Postal code: 231522
- Area code: +375 1514
- License plate: 4

Vasilishki (Belarusian: Васілі́шкі, romanized: Vasiliški; Russian: Васили́шки; Polish: Wasiliszki; Yiddish: װאַסילישאָק, romanized: Vasilishok; Lithuanian: Vosyliškės) is an agrotown in Shchuchyn District, Grodno Region, Belarus. It serves as the administrative center of Vasilishki selsoviet.

== History ==
Within the Grand Duchy of Lithuania, Vasilishki was part of Vilnius Voivodeship. In 1706, during the Great Northern War, King Stanisław Leszczyński stayed in the town. In 1766, the Wasiliszki starostwo was held by Michał Kazimierz Ogiński. In 1795, the town was acquired by the Russian Empire as a result of the Third Partition of Polish-Lithuanian Commonwealth.

In late 18th century it was part of Lida powiat of Wilno Governorate, Russian Empire. From 1919 until 1929, Vasilishki (Wasiliszki) was part of Lida County and from 1929 until 1939 of Szczuczyn County of the Nowogródek Voivodeship of the Second Polish Republic. In the 1921 census, 74.8% people declared Polish nationality, and 25.2% declared Jewish nationality.

=== World War II ===
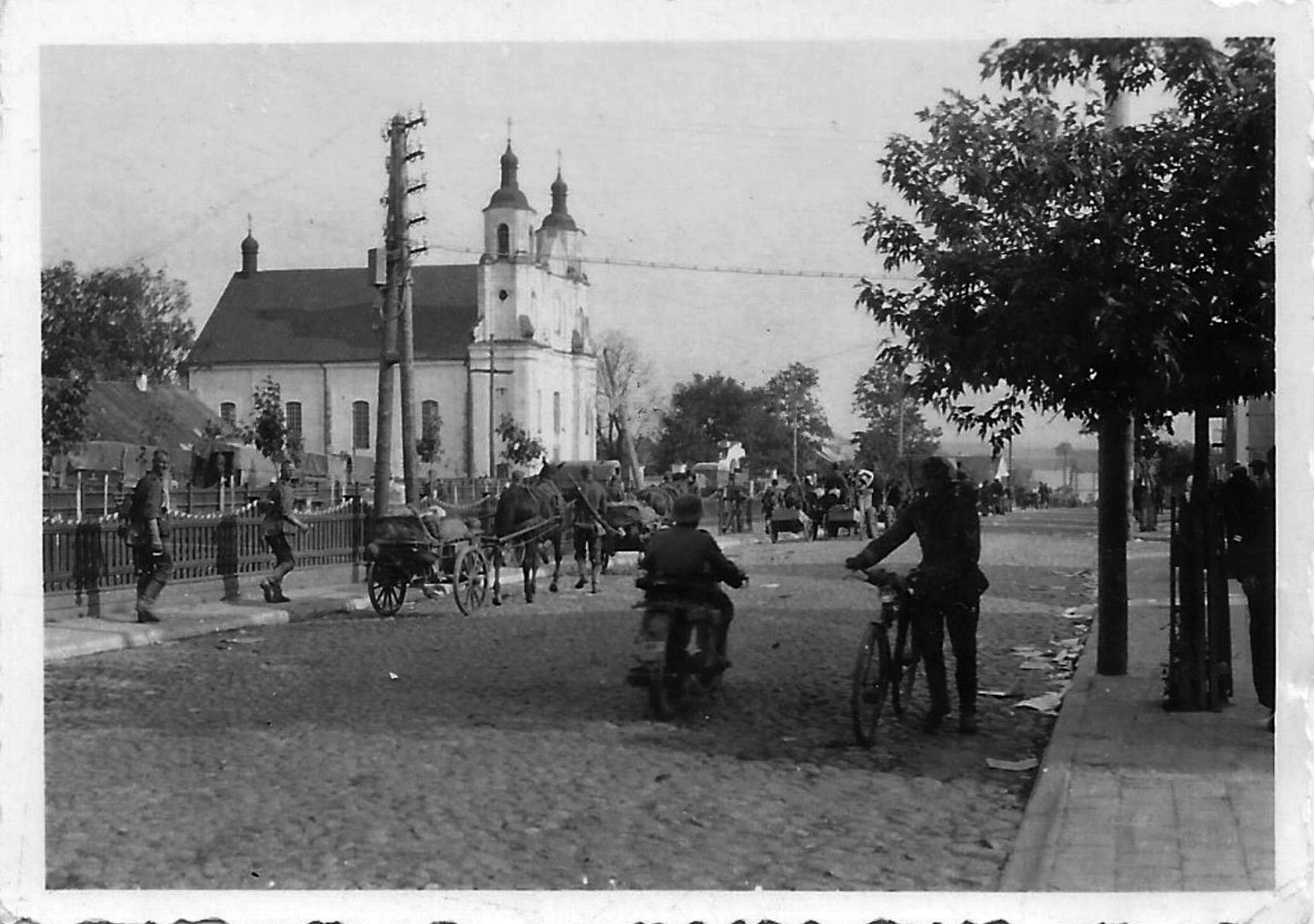
Wasiliszki in 1941

In September 1939, Vasilishki was occupied by the Red Army and, on 14 November 1939, incorporated into the Byelorussian SSR.

Vasilishki was occupied by Nazi Germany from June 1941 until 12 July 1944 and administered as a part of Generalbezirk Weißruthenien of Reichskommissariat Ostland. In December 1941, a ghetto was established (Vasilishki Ghetto) where Jews from the neighboring villages of Zaboloc and Sobakińce (Sabakintsy) were also kept imprisoned. Jews were forced to perform hard labor. On May 10, 1942, the Germans, assisted by the Lithuanian police, made a selection of the Jews in the central square. Between 1,800 and 2,200 Jews were shot in the Jewish cemetery over the course of 2 days, where pits had been dug in advance. The rest of the Jews, around 200 people, were transferred to different ghettos, among them the Lida ghetto. Some Jews survived by escaping to the forest.

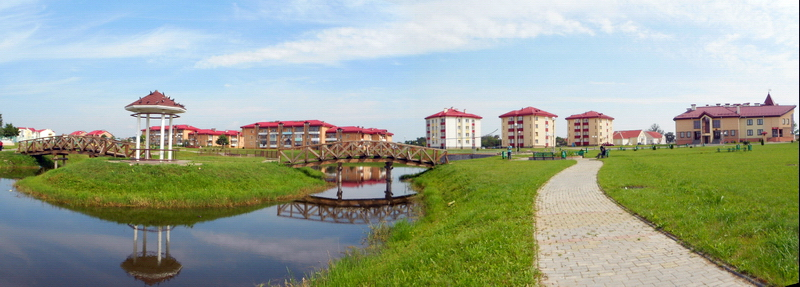
Modernized Vasilishki

== See also ==
- Staryya Vasilishki
