= Helmut Nadolski =

Polish musician (1942–2026)

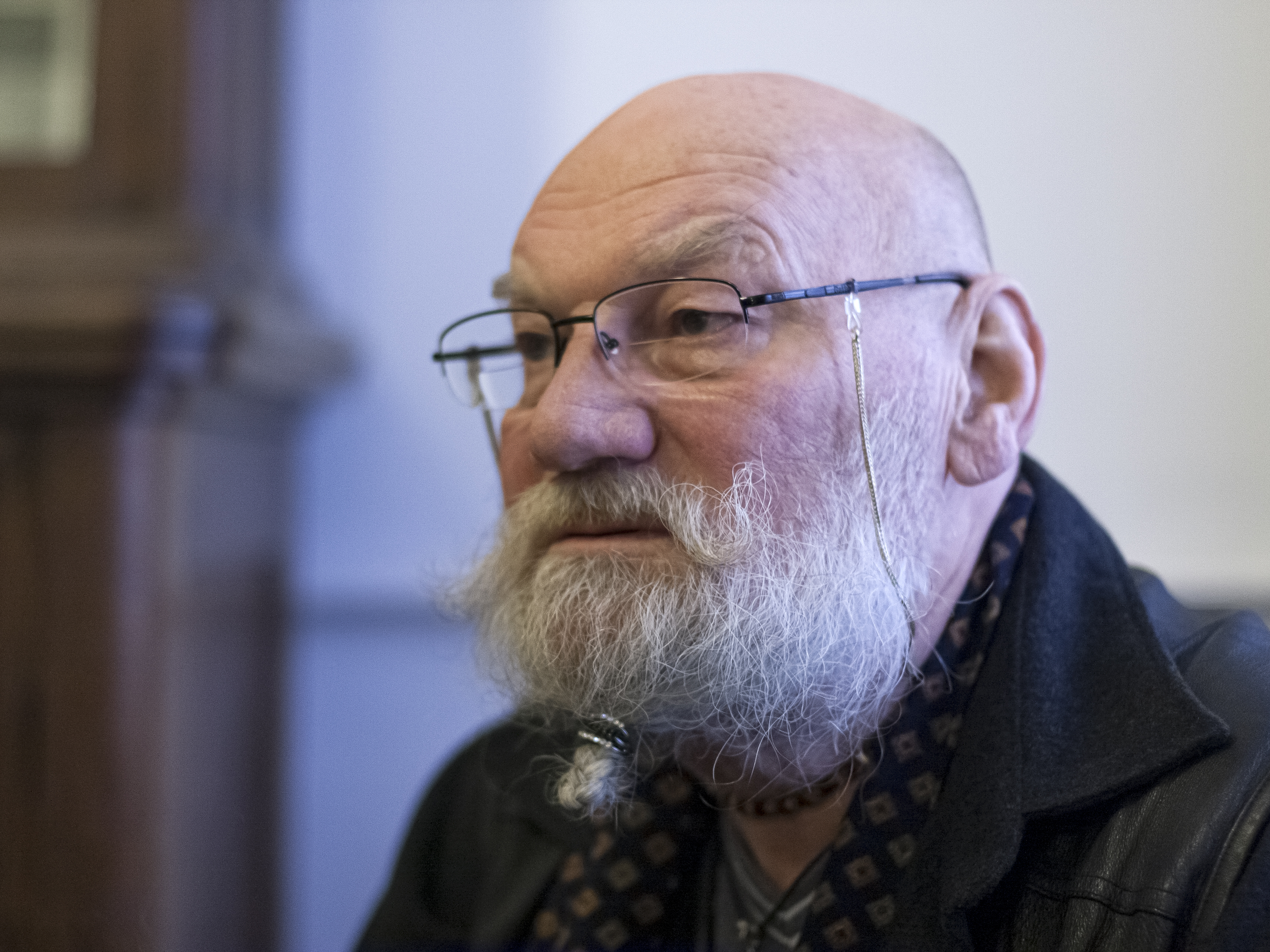
Helmut Nadolski

Helmut Nadolski (27 October 1942 – 8 June 2026) was a Polish musician.

== Life and career ==
Nadolski was born in Gdynia on 27 October 1942. During the 1960s, he studied clarinet and later double bass in Gdańsk. He emerged from the Tricity jazz scene, performing with groups such as Tralabomba Jazz Band and later the Jazz Players, gaining recognition at festivals including Jazz nad Odrą.

He became a member of trumpeter Andrzej Przybielski’s quartet and co-founded the experimental ensemble Sesja 72, helping establish Polish free jazz as an internationally respected movement. The group appeared at the Jazz Jamboree festival, where Nadolski’s highly experimental approach attracted widespread attention.

Nadolski joined Czesław Niemen’s progressive rock and jazz ensemble, playing on albums including Strange Is This World and Marionetki.

Nadolski died on 8 June 2026, at the age of 83.

== Awards ==
- 2012: Laureate of the Mayor of Gdańsk Award in the Field of Culture.
