= Czesław Niemen =

Polish composer and musician

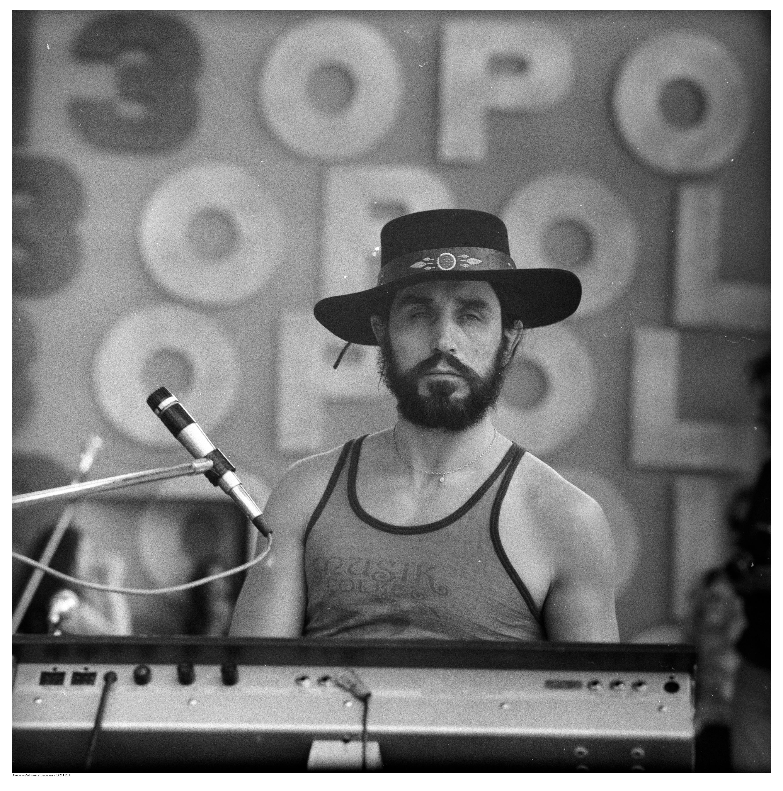
- Portrait of Niemen by photogrpaher Grażyna Rutowska whilst playing at the KFPP, 1975
- Born: Czesław Juliusz Wydrzycki; February 16, 1939; Stare Wasiliszki, Nowogródek Voivodeship, Second Polish Republic (now Belarus)
- Died: January 17, 2004 (aged 64); Warsaw, Poland
- Musical career
- Genres: Big-beat; progressive rock; sung poetry; jazz fusion; avant-garde jazz; electronic music
- Occupations: Singer-songwriter, multi-instrumentalist, poet
- Instruments: Multi-instrumentalist (i.e. keyboards and electronic instruments)
- Years active: 1967–2001
- Website: Niemen at polishmusic.ca

Czesław Niemen (Polish pronunciation: [ˈt͡ʂɛswaf ˈɲɛmɛn]; born Czesław Juliusz Wydrzycki; February 16, 1939 – January 17, 2004), often credited mononymously as Niemen, was a Polish singer-songwriter, composer, and bandleader. Singing primarily in Polish, he is regarded as one of the most important and innovative Polish singer-songwriters and rock balladeers of the 20th century, representing one of the main pillars of the countercultural big-beat genre of the Eastern Bloc. He was noted to possess an atypically wide vocal range with rich intonation.

As his career developed throughout the early 1970s, his output became more instrumentally complex, gradually falling under the influence of the progressive rock of Western Europe, avant-garde jazz from America, and free improvisation. His 1970 record Enigmatic is considered by many contemporary critics to be the greatest Polish rock album ever released, with many others of this era, including his self-titled "Red" album, considered classics in the then-nascent Polish jazz fusion scene. Lyrically, he would either provide his own material or adapt the poetry of revered Polish writers like Cyprian Norwid and Adam Asnyk.

== Biography ==
=== Early life ===
Niemen was born in Stare Wasiliszki in the Nowogródek Voivodeship of the Second Polish Republic (now in the Grodno Region of Belarus), to parents Antoni Wydrzycki (1896–1960) and Anna (née Markiewicz; 1897–1986). Niemen belonged to a community of Poles living outside the eastern borders of contemporary Poland, on the eastern lands of the historical Polish–Lithuanian Commonwealth (called 'Kresy' – 'borderlands' – in Polish). Czesław's father, Antoni, was a piano tuner, which had an impact on the young Niemen. From the age of 10, he was involved in both school and church choirs, sometimes playing organ accompaniment. Niemen briefly studied piano in Grodno at the pedagogical State College for one year, after which he was expelled for truancy. Aside from music, he also showed an interest in drawing and painting from an early age.

In 1959, at the age of 19, Niemen and his family were forcibly migrated to Northwest Poland along the Baltic Sea during the second repatriation of Poles, frequently moving between various cities, including Kołobrzeg, Świebodzin and Białogard.

=== 1960s ===
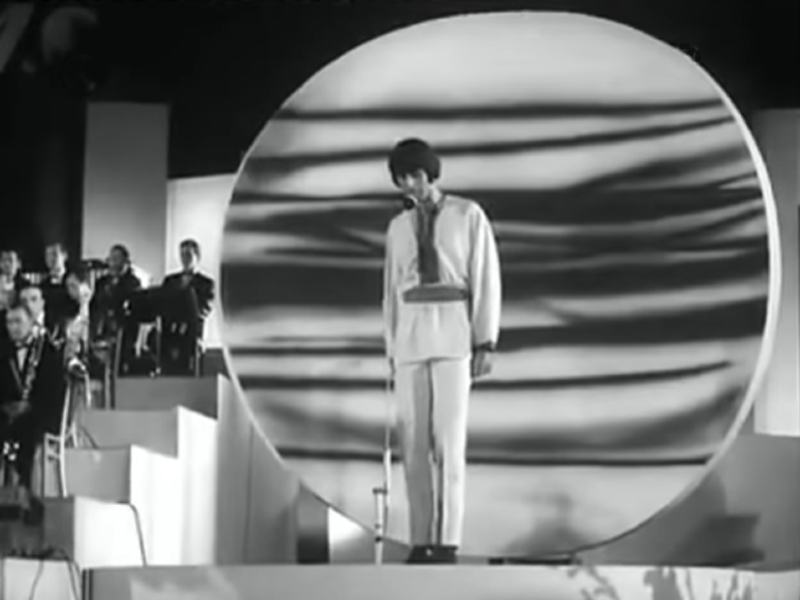
Niemen performing at the Sopot International Song Festival in August 1967.

In the early 1960s, Niemen began performing in student cabarets at local clubs in Gdańsk, first singing in foreign languages and later in his native Polish. Niemen found himself in the first group of Polish musicians who were identified with the burgeoning big-beat style of Eastern Europe, thanks to being among 15 winners of a festival for young performers in Szczecin in 1962. This victory allowed him to join the band Niebiesko-Czarni (The Blue-Blacks), one of the first professional pop-rock bands in Poland, with a number of leading vocalists performing one after another during concerts. He made his commercial debut in the following years, singing Polish rock and soul music.

In 1964 at Congress Hall, Warsaw, Niemen, together with his group, played as a support act to Marlene Dietrich during her concert. She heard his song "Czy mnie jeszcze pamiętasz" ("Do you still remember me?") there. She enjoyed it so much that she soon wrote her own lyrics for the song and recorded "Mutter, Hast du Mir Vergeben" ("Mother, have you forgiven me?").

Soon after his first successful concerts in France, he began to use the pseudonym Niemen instead of his real name, gaining wider fame in Poland and making it easier to pronounce by foreigners (Niemen is a Polish pronunciation of the Neman River, which flows in close proximity to his place of birth). His 1967 song "Dziwny jest ten świat" (Strange Is This World) is commonly acknowledged to be the most important Polish protest song of that era; an English version was also recorded in 1972. The song was influenced by the American blues tradition. He was one of the first Polish performers to wear long hair and colourful clothes and introduced the style of psychedelia to communist Poland, which displeased officials.

=== 1970s ===
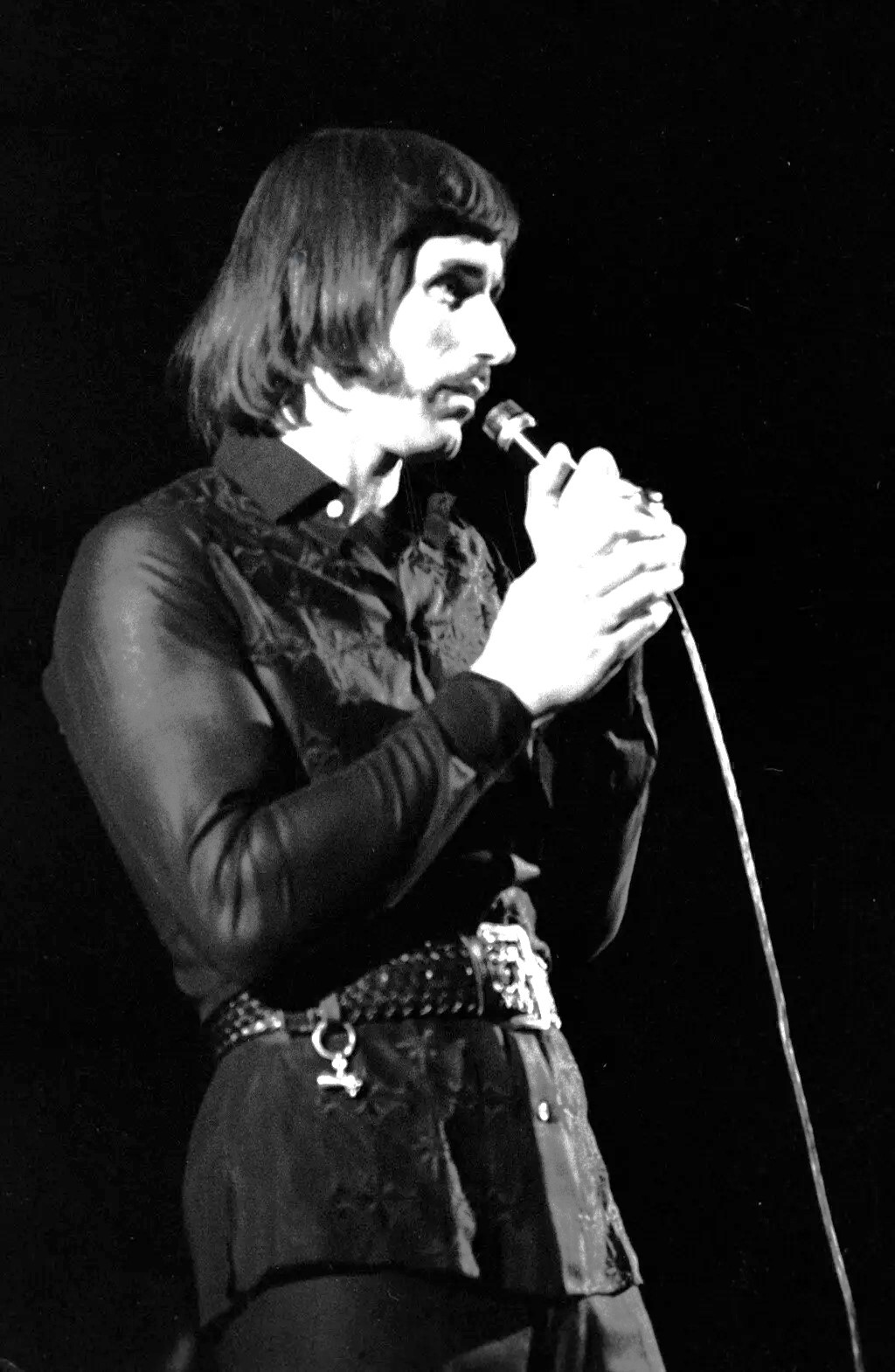
Niemen performing in Warsaw's Congress Hall in 1970.

The first three LP album's Niemen recorded with his band "Akwarele" (Watercolours). Subsequently, he recorded with his other new bands: "Enigmatic", "Grupa Niemen" and "Aerolit". In 1969 he changed his musical style to progressive rock while recording the monumental album Enigmatic. That album's most notable song was "Bema pamięci żałobny rapsod" (A Mournful Rhapsody in Memory of Józef Bem), based on the 19th-century poem by Cyprian Kamil Norwid. The rest of Enigmatic's songs were also in sung poetry form. Niemen played the Hammond organ on his records, later moving to the mellotron and the Moog synthesizer.

In the early 1970s, Niemen recorded three English language albums under the CBS label, two of them (and three more in Poland) with the Silesian band SBB. With SBB Niemen performed at the Rock & Jazz Now! opening show for the 1972 Summer Olympics in Munich sharing the stage with Mahavishnu Orchestra, John McLaughlin and Charles Mingus and subsequently toured with Jack Bruce's band. In 1972 he also performed a song he wrote in Andrzej Wajda's film Wesele (The Wedding). In 1974 he recorded Mourner's Rhapsody with Jan Hammer and Rick Laird from Mahavishnu Orchestra. In the seventies, Niemen turned to jazz fusion and electronic music, recording the album Katharsis. In an interview from this era, he said, "One thing I know is that I'm a composer. I want to concentrate on writing music for film, for theater. I don't know for how long I will continue singing. I am just bored by singing. This form of artistic expression seems quite exhausted for me. At least it does not excite me like it used to."

=== Later years and death ===
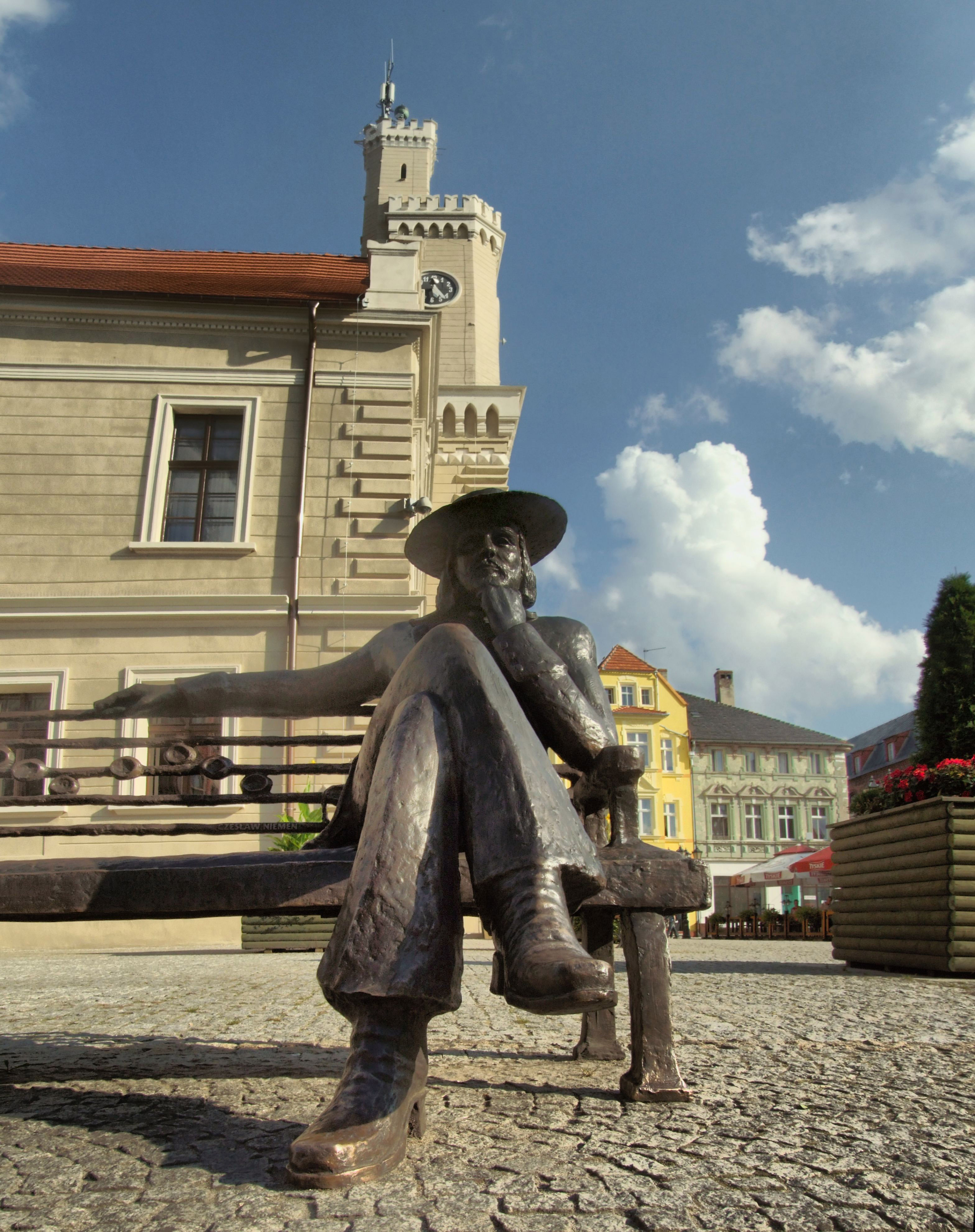
Statue of Niemen on a bench in Świebodzin.

Niemen went on to compose film soundtracks and theater music, and in the 1990s he showed interest in art, painting and computer graphics.

He died after a long battle with cancerous lymphomas on January 17, 2004, in Warsaw. His remains were cremated and placed in a columbarium niche on Powązki Cemetery in Warsaw on January 30, 2004. The funeral was attended by over 3,000 people.

== Awards and recognitions ==
Niemen won the Intervision Song Contest in 1979.

=== Remembrance ===
A number of documentaries on the life of Niemen were filmed, including Marek Piwowski's 1968 film Sukces, Krzysztof Rogulski's 1976 film Niemen, Eugeniusz Szpakowski's 2007 film Czesław Niemen, and Krzysztof Magowski's 2014 film Sen o Warszawie (A Dream About Warsaw).

Since March 12, 2004, Czesław Niemen's song Sen o Warszawie has been performed before each match of Legia Warsaw at the Stadion Wojska Polskiego and is considered the club fans' anthem.

In 2009, National Bank of Poland presented three coins dedicated to Niemen: issued on June 19 two silver 10-zloty coins, one of which of square shape, and issued on June 17, 2-zloty coin of Nordic Gold alloy.

On February 20, 2011, a museum devoted to Niemen and his musical legacy was opened in the artist's birthplace in Stare Wasiliszki, present-day Belarus.

== Niemen's support bands ==
Niemen cooperated with the following bands; some of them were support musicians, while others were independent bands: "Akwarele" ("Watercolours") (1967–1969), "I Niemen" ("And Niemen") (1969–1970), also under the name "Niemen Enigmatic"), "Grupa Niemen" (made of the members of Silesian Blues Band), Niebiesko-Czarni, "Aerolit", and female vocal band Alibabki. "Aerolit" accompanied Czesław Niemen in 1974–1978. Initially it was formed from young musicians of the rock band Krzak: Jacek Gazda, Jan Błędowski, Maciej Radziejewski, Piotr Dziemski. The word means "aerolite" in Polish.

== Discography ==
=== Studio albums ===
Title	Album details	Peak chart positions	Certifications
Title	Album details	POL	Certifications
Dziwny jest ten świat	Released: May 15, 1967; Label: Polskie Nagrania Muza	31	POL: Gold
Sukces	Released: May 20, 1968; Label: Polskie Nagrania Muza	—	
Czy mnie jeszcze pamiętasz?	Released: June 30, 1969; Label: Polskie Nagrania Muza	35	
Enigmatic	Released: January 19, 1970; Label: Polskie Nagrania Muza	28	POL: Gold
Niemen	Released: May 24, 1971; Label: Polskie Nagrania Muza	—	
Niemen Vol. 1	Released: 1973; Label: Polskie Nagrania Muza	—	
Niemen Vol. 2	Released: 1973; Label: Polskie Nagrania Muza	—	
Niemen Aerolit	Released: 1975; Label: Polskie Nagrania Muza	—	
Katharsis	Released: 1976; Label: Polskie Nagrania Muza	—	
Idée Fixe	Released: 1978; Label: Polskie Nagrania Muza	—	
Postscriptum	Released: 1980; Label: Polskie Nagrania Muza	—	
Przeprowadzka	Released: 1982; Label: Rogot	—	
Terra Deflorata	Released: February 20, 1989; Label: Veriton, Polton	—	
spodchmurykapelusza	Released: October 27, 2001; Label: EMI Music Poland	22	
"—" denotes a recording that did not chart or was not released in that territory.

=== English-language albums ===
Title	Album details
Strange Is This World	Released: 1972; Label: CBS
Ode to Venus	Released: 1973; Label: CBS
Mourner's Rhapsody	Released: 1974; Label: CBS

=== Russian-language albums ===
Title	Album details
Russische Lieder	Released: 1973; Label: CBS

=== Live albums ===
Title	Album details	Peak chart positions
Title	Album details	POL
41 Potencjometrów Pana Jana	Released: October 22, 2007; Label: Polskie Radio	27
Kattorna/Pamflet na ludzkość	Released: February 28, 2009; Label: Polskie Radio	24
"—" denotes a recording that did not chart or was not released in that territory.

=== Compilation albums ===
Title	Album details	Peak chart positions	Certifications
Title	Album details	POL	Certifications
The Best of Niemen	Released: 1979; Label: Polskie Nagrania Muza	—	
Gwiazdy mocnego uderzenia: Czesław Niemen	Released: 1991; Label: Polskie Nagrania Muza	—	
Sen o Warszawie	Released: 1995; Label: Polskie Nagrania Muza	37	
Czas jak rzeka: Złota kolekcja	Released: 2000; Label: EMI Music Poland	1	POL: Platinum
od początku I	Released: 2002; Label: Polskie Radio/Polskie Nagrania Muza	7	POL: Gold
od początku II	Released: 2003; Label: Polskie Radio/Polskie Nagrania Muza	14	
Spiżowy krzyk	Released: May 30, 2008; Label: Polskie Nagrania Muza	20	
Nasz Niemen	Released: July 27, 2009; Label: Agora SA	—	POL: Platinum
Pamiętam ten dzień	Released: November 7, 2011; Label: Polskie Radio	4	POL: Platinum
"—" denotes a recording that did not chart or was not released in that territory.

Awards and achievements
Preceded by Lidia Stanisławska with "Gwiazda nad Tobą"	Poland in the Intervision Song Contest; 1979	Succeeded by Alicja Majewska with "Jeszcze się tam żagiel bieli"
Preceded by (Soviet Union) Alla Pugacheva with "Vsyo mogut koroli"	Winner of the Intervision Song Contest; 1979	Succeeded by (Czechoslovakia) Marika Gombitová with "Chcem sa s tebou deliť" (Finland) Marion Rung with "Hyvästi yö" (Soviet Union) Mykola Hnatyuk with "Na vstrechu oseni" (three-way tie)
