= Alibabki =

Polish vocal band (1963–1988)

Alibabki was a Polish all-female vocal band active from 1963 to 1988 (with a hiatus during the 1980s). All the performers resided in Warsaw. Their major musical styles were pop music, "big beat", and ska. They performed both as an individual band and as a support group for various musicians. Alone and together with other artists, Alibabki performed about 2000 songs. Their singing was used in a number of Polish films. Occasionally the group name is incorrectly referred to as Ali-babki. The band was a recipient of multiple awards.

The name of the band is a pun, a portmanteau of "Ali Baba" and "babki", the latter word being a colloquialism for "women", an example of exoticism in pop music of Communist Poland.

== Awards and recognition ==
- A number of awards from the National Festival of Polish Song in Opole, including for the songs "Idzie świt” (1964), "Gdy zmęczeni wracamy z pól” (1965),"To ziemia” (1968), and "Kwiat jednej nocy” (1969)
- 1967: They were backup singers for the award-winning song Dziwny jest ten świat by Czesław Niemen
- 2009: Silver Medal for Merit to Culture – Gloria Artis.
- 2009: A star for Alibabki was installed at the Alley of Stars of the Polish Song Festival in Opole
