= Andrzej Przybielski =

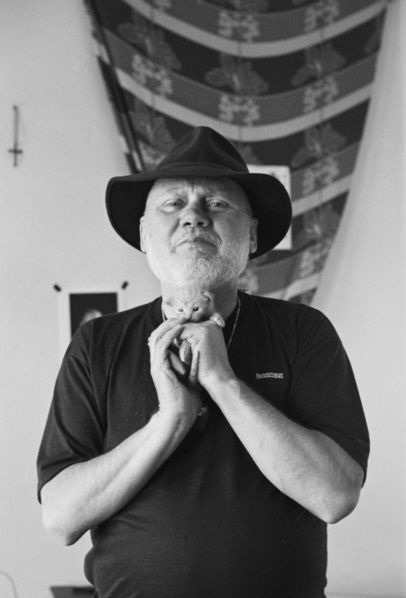
- Andrzej Przybielski in private. Photo by Stanisław Wawro

Background information
- Born: Andrzej Grzegorz Przybielski; August 9, 1944; Bydgoszcz, Poland
- Died: February 9, 2011 (aged 66) Bydgoszcz, Poland
- Genres: Jazz
- Instrument: Trumpet

Andrzej Grzegorz Przybielski (August 9, 1944 – February 9, 2011) was a Polish jazz trumpeter associated with the avant-garde jazz and free jazz scenes.

== Career ==
Having graduated from the Technic School of Bydgoszcz, Andrzej Przybielski began with traditional jazz, playing with Bogdan Ciesielski and Jacek Bednarek within the "Traditional Jazz group". Until the mid-1960s he played cornet and trumpet, specializing in blues and Dixieland music, his inspiration coming from Dizzy Gillespie and Miles Davis.

In 1968, along with the Gdansk Trio he won the Jazz nad Odrą (Jazz aboard the Oder). In 1969, along with the Modern Music Foundation, he took part in the Jazz Jamboree festival.

He composed for the Warszawa National Theatre, the Performer Theatre in Zamość, and the Witkacy Theatre of Zakopane. He cooperated with such musicians as: Helmut Nadolski, Jacek Bednarek, Andrzej Kurylewicz, Czesław Niemen, Tomasz Stańko, Stanisław Sojka, Adam Hanuszkiewicz, Wanda Warska, the brothers Marcin and Bartłomiej Oleś, Ryszard Tymon Tymański, Wojciech Konikewicz and Józef Skrzek. He was the co-leader and co-author of the groups Sesja, Big Band Free Cooperation and Acoustic Action and developed a long-lasting relation with the band SBB.

At the beginning of the 1990s he founded his own group in his home town of Bydgoszcz and named it Asocjacja Andrzeja Przybielskiego (The Andrzej Przybielski Association). This consisted of the following musicians: Karol Szymanowski (vibes), Andrzej Kujawa (bass), Józef Eljasz (percussion). One year later, he formed another group with Grzegorz Nadolny (bass) and Grzegorz Daroń (percussion). The association was the artist's main creative project and remained very active with the same performers until the end of his life, performing many concerts throughout Poland and the rest of Europe.

In addition, he contributed to the Yass scene. He could be heard at the Mózg club in Bydgoszcz, notably in the company of the groups Sing Sing Penelope and NRD.

Przybielski died on February 9, 2011. He was buried at the Bydgoszcz Municipal Cemetery on February 15, 2011.

On February 9, 2012, the first anniversary of the artist's death, Zdzisław Pająk published his biography Maluj muzykę, bracie. Andrzej Przybielski 1944-2011 (Paint the music, brother. Andrzej Przybielski 1944-2011).

== Discography ==
- Jazz Jamboree 1969 – Andrzej Przybielski Quartet Żeberówka (1969, composition No 2)
- Jazz Jamboree 1970 – Andrzej Kurylewicz Contemporary Music Formation & Wanda Warska (1970, compositions No 3 to 6)
- Andrzej Kurylewicz – Music for theater and television. (1970, Muza SXL 0831)
- Czeslaw Niemen – Niemen vol. 2 Marionetki (Puppets) (1973)
- Iga Cembrzynska & Session 72 – Four dialogues with conscience (1973)
- SBB – Sikorki (Chickadees) (1973–1975)
- SBB – Wicher w polu dmie (Noon squall) (1973–1975)
- Niobe – TV show (1975)
- Andrzej Przybielski/Aleksander Korecki – Lykantropia (Lycanthropy) animation by Piotr Dumała (1981)
- Stanisław Sojka – Sojka Sings Ellington (1982)
- Zbigniew Lewandowski – Zbigniew Lewandowski (1983, Poljazz PSJ 125)
- Helmut Nadolski – Jubileuszowa Orkiestra (Orchestra of the Jubilee) (1983, Alma Art 001)
- Andrzej Przybielski – W sferze dotyku (In the sphere of touch) (1984)
- Andrzej Mitan - W Świetej racji (1984, Alma Art 003)
- Biezan/Dziubak/Mitan/Nadolski/Przybielski – Klub Muzyki Nowej Remont (New Remont Music Club) (1984)
- Przybielski/Mitan/Kurtis/Litwiński/Trzciński/Wegehaupt/Zgraja/Baruch - Music of theatral show Księga Hioba (Book of Job) (1985)
- Przedstawienie Hamleta we wsi Głucha Dolna – TV show (1985)
- Free Cooperation – Taniec Słoni (Elephants dance) (1985)
- Green Revolution – movie soundtrack Na całość (1986)
- Free Cooperation – In the Higher School (1986, Poljazz PSJ 188)
- Tomasz Stańko – Peyotl Witkacy (1988)
- Stanisław Sojka – Radioaktywny (Radioactive) (1989)
- Free Cooperation – Our Master's Voice (1989, Poljazz PSJ 186)
- Kciuk – A little wing (1990, Arston ALP 050)
- T.Love – Pocisk miłości (Bullet of love) (1991)
- Variété – Variété (1993)
- Stół Pański – Gadające drzewo (The talkative tree) (1997)
- Mazzoll, Kazik i Arythmic Perfection – Rozmowy s catem (1997)
- Maestro Trytony – Enoptronia (1997)
- Tribute to Miles Orchestra – Live – Akwarium, Warszawa (1998)
- Stanisław Sojka & Andrzej Przybielski – Sztuka błądzenia (The wandering art) (1999–2000)
- Mazzoll – Muzyka dla supersamów (Music for supermarket) (2000)
- Custom Trio – Free Bop (2000)
- The Ślub – Pierwsza (First) (2000)
- Custom Trio (Andrzej Przybielski/Marcin Oleś/Brat Oleś/Janusz Smyk) – Live (2001)
- Andy Lumpp Trio & Andrzej Przybielski – Music From Planet Earth (2000)
- Tymon Tymański & The Waiters – Theatricon Plixx (2001)
- KaPeLa Trio & Andrzej Przybielski – Barwy przestrzeni (The colors of space) (2002) – not published
- The Ślub – Druga (Second) (2002) – not published
- Orkiestra Świętokrzyska (Orchestra of the Holy Cross) – Wykłady z Geometrii Muzyki (Lectures on Geometry of Music) (2003)
- Andy Lumpp Trio & Andrzej Przybielski – Musica Ex Spiritu Sancto (2003)
- Konikiewicz/Przybielski – Antyjubileusz (Anti jubilee) (2003) – not published
- United Power of Fortalicje – Live - Teatr Performer, Zamość (2003) – not published
- Transtechnologic Orchestra (Przybielski, Konikiewicz) 2CD – Live – Teatr Mały, Warszawa (2003) – not published
- Andrzej Przybielski/Marcin Oleś/Brat Oleś – music of theatrical TV show Pasożyt (Parasite) (2003)
- Andrzej Przybielski/Marcin Oleś/Brat Oleś – Abstract (2005, Not Two Records MW 761-2)
- Asocjacja Andrzeja Przybielskiego (Andrzej Przybielski Association, with Andrzej Przybielski (trumpet), Yura Ovsiannikow (sax), Grzegorz Nadolny (bass) and Grzegorz Daroń (percussion)) – Sesja Open (2005) – published on August 16, 2011 by the Bydgoszcz Municipal Cultural Office, for the concert tribute to Andrzej Przybielski
- Green Grass – Blues dla Majki (Blues for Majka) (2007)
- Sing Sing Penelope et Andrzej Przybielski – Stirli People (2010, Monotype Records 022)
- The Ślub – Trzeciak (Third) (2010) – not published
- Question Mark – Laboratory (2010)
- Andrzej Przybielski/Marcin Oleś/Brat Oleś – De Profundis (2011)
- Andrzej Przybielski / Jacek Mazurkiewicz / Paweł Osicki – Tren Żałobny (Mournful train) (2011)
- The Ślub – Bella Provincia (2014, ForTune 0024)

== Recognition ==
On 14 February 2011, Andrzej Przybielski was posthumously made a Knight of the Cross of the Order of Rebirth of Poland.

== Bibliography ==
- Pruss, Zdzisław, Weber, Alicja and Kuczma, Rajmund. Bydgoski leksykon muzyczny (pages 474-475). Bydgoszcz: Kujawsko-Pomorskie Towarzystwo Kulturalne, 2004.
- Pająk, Zdzisław. Maluj muzykę, bracie. Andrzej Przybielski 1944-2011. Bydgoszcz: Miejski Ośrodek Kultury w Bydgoszczy (Bydgoszcz Municipal Cultural Office), 2012. ISBN 978-83-910303-4-9.
