= Wojciech Młynarski =

Polish writer, singer, translator and director

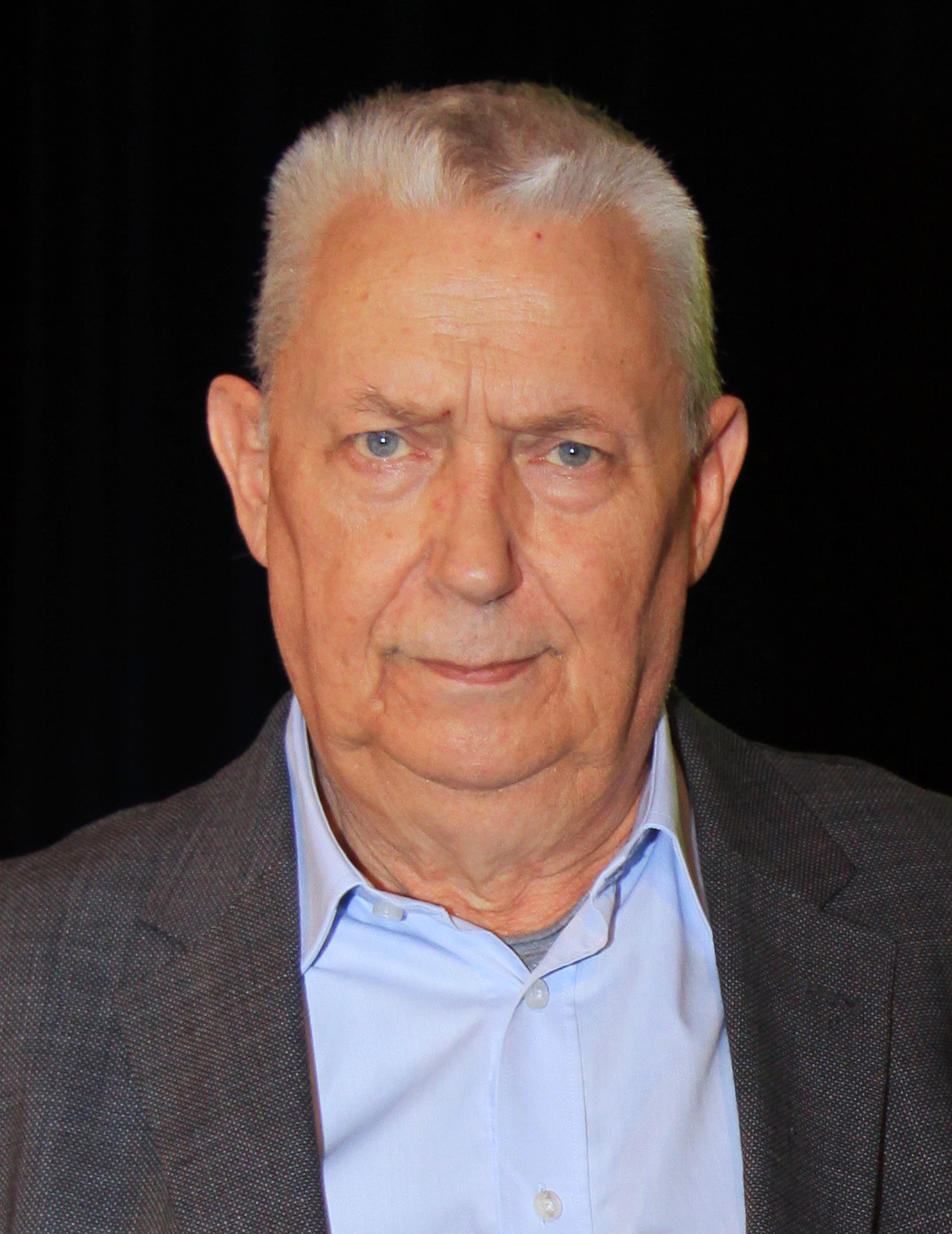
- Wojciech Młynarski in 2012
- Born: 26 March 1941; Warsaw, Poland
- Died: 15 March 2017 (aged 75); Warsaw, Poland
- Occupations: singer, lyricist, composer, writer, translator, satirist
- Children: Agata Młynarska; Paulina Młynarska; Jan Młynarski

Wojciech Młynarski (26 March 1941 – 15 March 2017) was a Polish poet, singer, songwriter, translator and director. A well-known figure on the Polish musical scene, he was most famous for his ballads and what is known as sung poetry, as well as for his collaboration with numerous vocalists and cabarets. He wrote lyrics to more than 2,000 songs, a small fraction of which he sang himself. His songs received a total of 25 "Karolinkas", which are the main awards of the Polish Song Festival in Opole, the most important Polish song festival, occurring annually since 1963. He also composed music to some of his songs. He is considered an icon of Polish culture.

== Biography ==
Born on 26 March 1941 in Warsaw, he graduated from the Tomasz Zan High School in Pruszków and then, in 1963, from the Faculty of Polish Language Studies at Warsaw University (summa cum laude). It was during his university years that he started collaborating with the Hybrydy student theatre and cabaret. By the mid-1960s he became an established author of texts for numerous cabarets, the most famous of which were the Dudek, Dreszczowiec and Owca groups. By the late 1960s, several of his songs became hits on Polish Television; Młynarski also gained popularity as a translator of texts of French and Russian poets and songwriters, including Jacques Brel, Georges Brassens, Gilbert Bécaud and Vladimir Vysotsky. For his translations of the French language lyrics and poetry, particularly that of Jacques Brel, Charles Aznavour and Georges Brassens, Młynarski was awarded the French Legion of Honour (Ordre national de la Légion d'honneur). He is the recipient of several Polish State orders, including the Order of the White Eagle.

In the 1970s, Wojciech Młynarski authored numerous operas and musicals, including "Henryk VI na łowach", "Cień" and "Awantura w Recco". He also translated the librettos of the musicals Cabaret, Chicago and Jesus Christ Superstar into Polish.

In 2013, the first Festival of Wojciech Młynarski's Songs was organized in the city of Sopot.

He died on 15 March 2017 after a long illness.

== Personal life ==
He was married to the actress Adrianna Godlewska (later divorced). The couple had 3 children: Agata Młynarska (born 1965), a Polish TV celebrity journalist, director and producer; Paulina Młynarska (born 1970) a journalist and an actress; and Jan Młynarski (born 1979), a musician.

Wojciech Młynarski was related to Emil Młynarski, Polish composer and the founder of the Warsaw Philharmonic; composer and painter Roman Orłow; and related by marriage to pianist Arthur Rubinstein.

== Discography ==
- 1967 – Wojciech Młynarski śpiewa swoje piosenki
- 1968 – Dziewczyny bądźcie dla nas dobre na wiosnę
- 1970 – Obiad rodzinny
- 1971 – Recital '71
- 1980 – Szajba
- 1987 – Młynarski w Ateneum – Recital '86
- 1989 – Jeszcze w zielone gramy
- 1989 – Młynarski w Paryżu
- 1995 – Piosenki... ballady...
- 1995 – Róbmy swoje 95
- 2000 – Złota Kolekcja Absolutnie
- 2001 – Prawie całość (5 CDs)
- 2002 – Niedziela na Głównym Gala 2001
- 2004 – Zamknięty rozdział
- 2004 – Młynarski i Sent. Jesteśmy na wczasach ... na żywo 2001
- 2005 – Czterdziecha
- 2006 – Od piosenki do piosenki. Gwiazdozbiór muzyki rozrywkowej
- 2008 – "Pogadaj ze mna"
- 2014 – "Tutaj Mieszkam"
