= Franciszek Walicki =

Polish journalist and musician

- Born: 20 July 1921; Łódź, Poland
- Died: 3 October 2015 (aged 94); Gdynia, Poland
- Occupation(s): Journalist, musician
- Honours: Righteous Among the Nations Officer's Cross of the Order of Polonia Restituta

Franciszek Walicki (20 July 1921 – 3 October 2015) was a Polish journalist. He was considered the father of Polish beat and rock music, calling them big-beat as rock and roll was unacceptable name for the authorities of the Polish People's Republic at the time.

In 1956 he and Leopold Tyrmand organized the first Jazz Festival in Sopot. Walicki also founded a number of important Polish bands:

- 1959 – Rythm and Blues – the first Polish big beat group
- 1960 – Czerwono-Czarni
- 1962 – Niebiesko-Czarni
- 1968 – Breakout
- 1974 – SBB

== Awards and distinctions ==
- 1996 – Officer's Cross of the Order of Polonia Restituta
- Righteous among the Nations medal
- 1998 – Grand Prix, National Festival of Polish Song in Opole
