= Teraz Rock =

- Editor-in-chief: Wiesław Weiss
- Former editors: Wiesław Weiss (Tylko Rock)
- Categories: Music magazine
- Frequency: Monthly
- Circulation: 40,000
- Publisher: Advertigo S.A.
- Founded: 2003
- Country: Poland
- Based in: Warsaw
- Language: Polish
- Website: www.terazrock.pl
- ISSN: 1730-394X

Teraz Rock is a monthly hobby magazine in Poland about all kinds of rock music (metal, progressive rock, punk rock etc.).

== History and profile ==
Teraz Rock was founded in 2003 by Wiesław Królikowski, and Wiesław Weiss. In 2003 the magazine staff have successfully cooperated with the new editor by the title „Teraz Rock” („Rock Now”), previously Tylko Rock. Teraz Rock is published by Advertigo S.A. on a monthly basis.

Beside the founders, the core journalists are: Grzesiek Kszczotek, Bartek Koziczyński, Jacek Nizinkiewicz and Michał Kirmuć.

Over the years „Teraz/Tylko Rock” has hosted monthly articles written by the most important Polish musicians such as Czesław Niemen, Kazik Staszewski, Lech Janerka, Tomasz Budzyński and the members of Myslovitz band. It also features outstanding contributing journalists e.g. Piotr Kaczkowski of Polskie Radio Program III.

The journalists of the magazine regularly publish books covering rock music. Wiesław Weiss has written „The Great Rock Encyclopedia” and several books about Pink Floyd. Wiesław Królikowski is the author of „The Polish Rock Records Guide”. Bartek Koziczyński has written unofficial biographies of Tool and Red Hot Chili Peppers.

“Teraz Rock” is the only music magazine in Poland with circulation audited by ZKDP (Press Association of Distribution and Sales Control).
