= 2 Plus 1 discography =

- Studio albums: 10
- Extended plays: 3
- Compilation albums: 20
- Singles: 29

The discography of a Polish band 2 Plus 1 consists of ten studio albums, twenty compilation albums, three EPs, and twenty-nine singles. Three of their studio albums (Nowy wspaniały świat, Easy Come, Easy Go and Bez limitu) have been certified Gold in Poland for selling in over 150,000 copies each. 2 Plus 1 have released seventeen singles in Poland, nine in Germany, two in Japan, and one in Cuba.

== Studio albums ==
List of studio albums, with selected details
Title	Album details	Certifications
Nowy wspaniały świat	Released: 1972; Label: Polskie Nagrania Muza; Format: LP, CD	POL: Gold
Wyspa dzieci	Released: 1975; Label: Polskie Nagrania Muza; Format: LP, CD	
Aktor	Released: 1977; Label: Polskie Nagrania Muza; Format: LP, CD	
Teatr na drodze	Released: 1978; Label: Polskie Nagrania Muza; Format: LP, cassette, CD	
Irlandzki tancerz	Released: 1979; Label: Wifon; Format: LP, cassette, CD	
Easy Come, Easy Go	Released: 1980; Label: Autobahn, Wifon; Format: LP	POL: Gold
Warsaw Nights	Released: 1981; Label: Autobahn; Format: LP	
Bez limitu	Released: 1983; Label: Tonpress; Format: LP, cassette, CD	POL: Gold
Video	Released: 1985; Label: Savitor; Format: LP, cassette	
Antidotum	Released: 1989; Label: Tonpress; Format: LP, cassette, CD	

== Compilation albums ==
List of compilations, with selected details and chart positions
Title	Album details	POL
Złote przeboje	Released: 1978; Label: Wifon; Format: cassette	—
Greatest Hits Live	Released: 1986; Label: PolJazz; Format: LP, cassette	—
Pierwsze przeboje	Released: 1990; Label: Laser Sound; Format: cassette	—
18 Greatest Hits	Released: 1991; Label: Sonic; Format: CD	—
21 Greatest Hits	Released: 1996; Label: Sonic; Format: CD, cassette	—
Greatest Hits Vol. 2	Released: 1997; Label: Sonic; Format: CD, cassette	—
Gold	Released: 1998; Label: Koch International Poland; Format: CD, cassette	—
Platynowa kolekcja – Złote przeboje	Released: 1999; Label: Point Music; Format: CD, cassette	36
Rarytasy	Released: 2000; Label: Andromeda; Format: CD	—
Easy Come, Easy Go/Warsaw Nights ...and More	Released: 2000; Label: Sonic; Format: CD	—
Złote przeboje	Released: 2002; Label: Snake's Music; Format: CD	—
Windą do nieba – Perły	Released: 2003; Label: Accord Song; Format: CD	—
Wielki mały człowiek – The Best	Released: 2004; Label: Agencja Artystyczna MTJ; Format: CD	—
Iść w stronę słońca – Złota kolekcja	Released: 2006; Label: EMI Music Poland; Format: CD	—
XXI wiek – Platynowe przeboje	Released: 2007; Label: Agencja Artystyczna MTJ; Format: CD	—
Platynowa kolekcja – Największe polskie przeboje	Released: 2008; Label: Agencja Artystyczna MTJ; Format: CD	—
2 Plus 1	Released: 10 December 2010; Label: Agora SA; Format: 6 × CD box set	—
Windą do nieba – Tylko polskie piosenki	Released: 2011; Label: Polskie Nagrania Muza; Format: CD	—
40 przebojów	Released: 26 October 2012; Label: Polskie Nagrania Muza; Format: CD	—
Bursztynowa kolekcja empik – The Very Best Of	Released: July 2015; Label: Agencja Artystyczna MTJ; Format: CD	—

== EPs ==
List of extended plays, with selected details
Title	Album details
2+1	Released: 1971; Label: Polskie Nagrania Muza; Formats: 7"
Two Plus One	Released: 1974; Label: Polskie Nagrania Muza; Formats: 7"
Dwa Plus Jeden	Released: 1976; Label: Tonpress; Formats: 2 × 7"

== Singles ==
List of singles, with selected chart positions
Title	Year	GER	JAP	Album
"Panna radosna"	1971	—	—	2+1
"Na luzie"	1974	—	—	Wyspa dzieci
"Wyspa dzieci"	1975	—	—	Wyspa dzieci
"Na naszym piętrze nowina"	1975	—	—	Wyspa dzieci
"Schlafe ein und fang die Träume"	1975	—	—	—N/a
"A ty się z tego śmiej"	1976	—	—	—N/a
"It's No the Way to Say Goodbye"	1976	—	—	—N/a
"Feuervogel (Wer den Feuervogel liebt)"	1976	—	—	—N/a
"Ring Me Up"	1977	—	—	—N/a
"Ding-dong"	1978	—	—	Teatr na drodze
"California mon amour"	1978	—	—	Teatr na drodze
"Orkiestra klownów"	1978	—	—	—N/a
"Margarita"	1979	—	—	—N/a
"Idę na zachód zielony"	1979	—	—	Irlandzki tancerz
"Taksówka nr 5"	1979	—	—	—N/a
"Easy Come, Easy Go"	1979	40	—	Easy Come, Easy Go
"Singapore"	1980	—	7	Easy Come, Easy Go
"Allah Inch' Allah"	1980	—	—	Easy Come, Easy Go
"Mama Chita"	1980	—	—	Warsaw Nights
"Lady Runaway"	1981	—	—	Warsaw Nights
"Hurry Home (Hurricane)"	1981	—	—	Warsaw Nights
"Blue Lights of Pasadena"	1981	—	—	Warsaw Nights
"Kalkuta nocą"	1982	—	—	—N/a
"Rocky Doctor"	1983	—	—	—N/a
"Krach"	1983	—	—	Bez limitu
"Wielki mały człowiek"	1984	—	—	Video
"Video"	1985	—	—	Video
"Koszmar"	1985	—	—	Video
"Orły do boju"	1985	—	—	—N/a
