= Ernest Bryll =

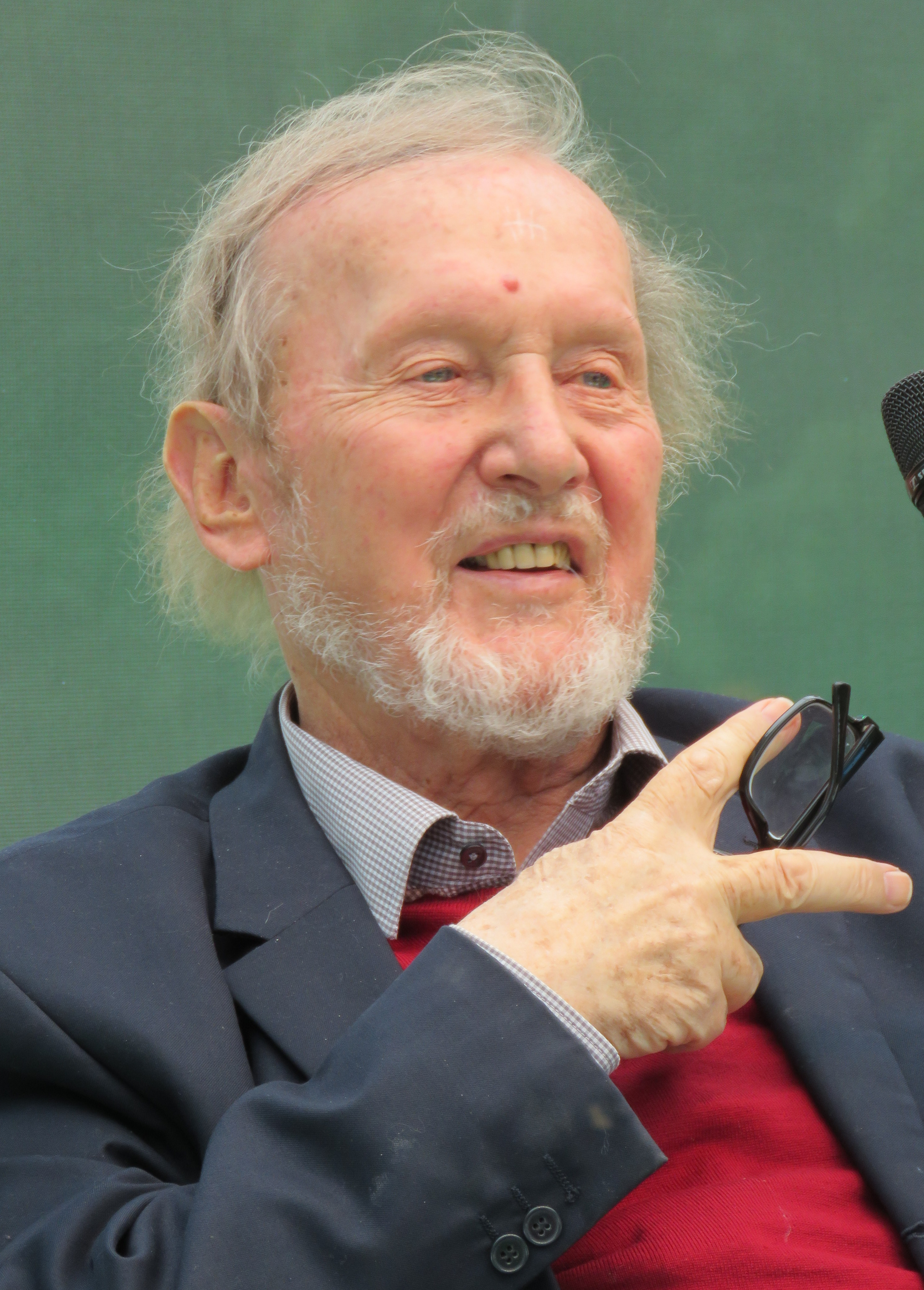
- Ernest Bryll (Warsaw 2018)
- Born: 1 March 1935; Warsaw, Poland
- Died: 16 March 2024 (aged 89); Warsaw, Poland
- Writing career
- Language: Polish
- Notable work: Kolęda-nocka; Rzecz listopadowa; Wieczernik; Sztuka stosowana
- Notable awards: Nagroda im. W. Broniewskiego w dziedzinie poezji (1964), Nagroda II stopnia Ministerstwa Kultury i Sztuki (1965), Nagroda im. Stanisława Piętaka (1968), Nagroda II stopnia Ministerstwa Kultury i Sztuki (1973), Nagroda Miasta Warszawy (1973), Nagroda Narodowego Funduszu Kultury (1989), Nagroda im. Franciszka Karpińskiego (1998), Nagroda im. Włodzimierza Pietrzaka (2003) Medal Daniela Gabriela Richarda za krzewienie rozwoju ludowej kultury Słowacji (2004), Nagroda im. Cypriana Norwida w kategorii „Literatura” (2009), Nagroda Miasta Stołecznego Warszawy (2009), Medal Per Artem ad Deum (2021)
- Website: bryll.pl

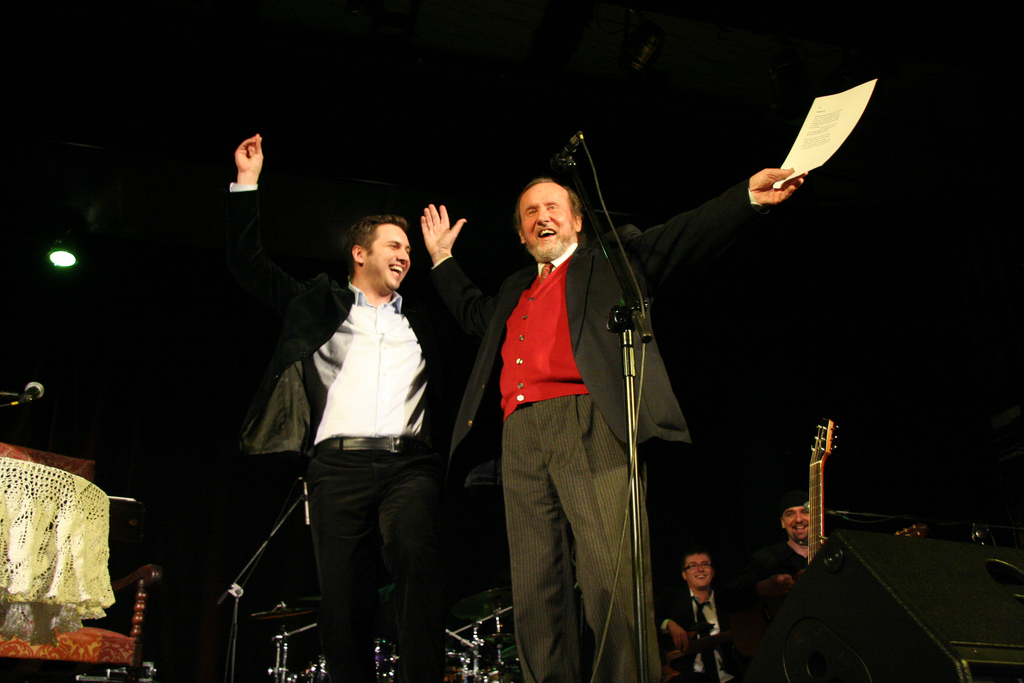
Marcin Styczeń and Ernest Bryll (2009)

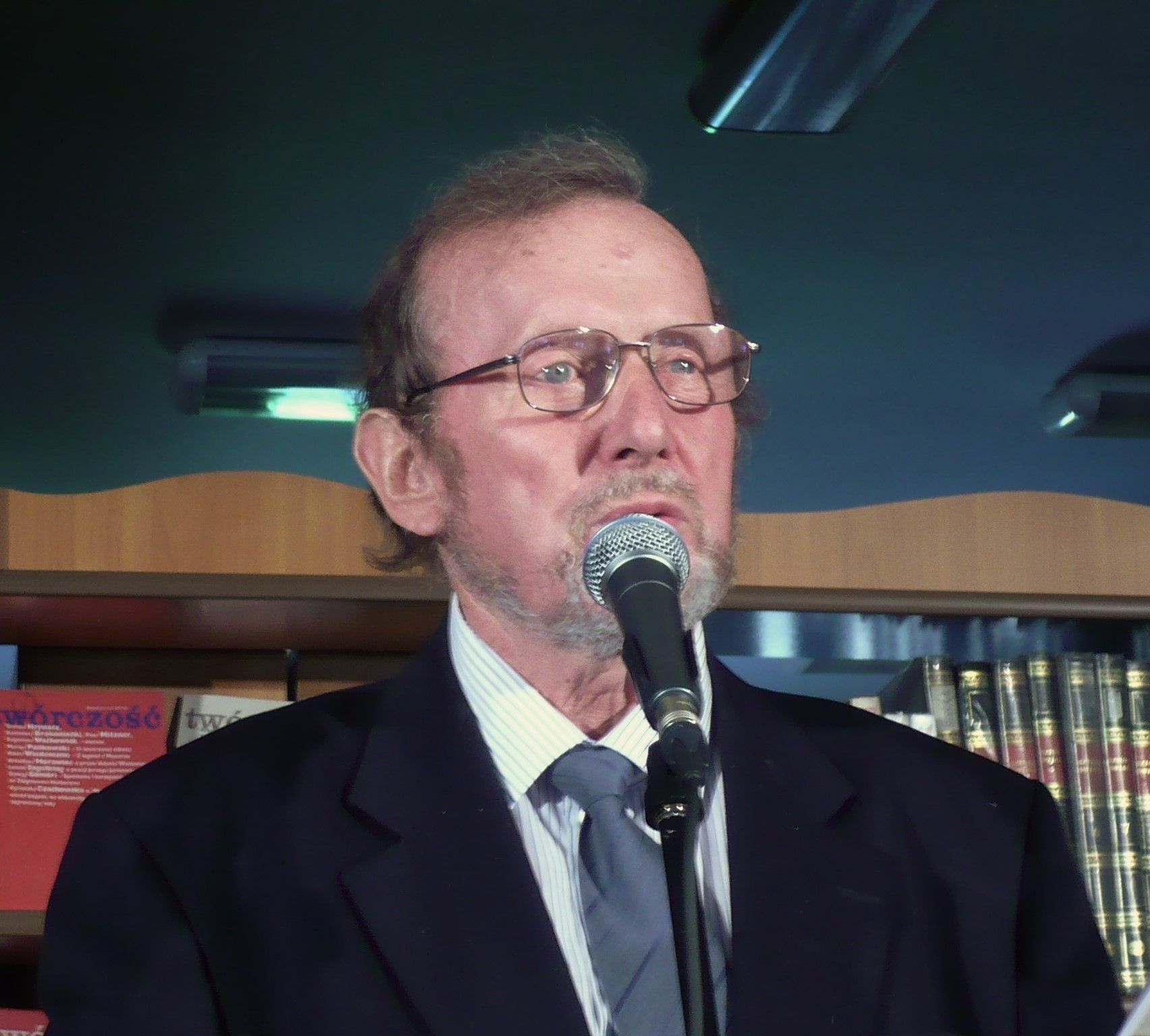
Ernest Bryll in Nowa Ruda (2010)

Ernest Włodzimierz Bryll (1 March 1935 – 17 March 2024) was a Polish poet, writer, songwriter, journalist, translator, film critic and diplomat.

== Life ==
Bryll was part of a peasant family from Kuyavia lake Gopło and grew up in Komorowo Stare and Gdynia. He graduated from the 2nd Liceum Ogólnokształcące in Gdynia, the Polish Philology faculty of Uniwersytetu Warszawskiego (1956) and studied film at Łódź Film School. Due to his father's background in the Home Army, he was blacklisted from his dream of becoming a journalist, and he began working in power plant no. 11 in the Port of Gdynia and Stocznia Gdynia.

His first book of poetry, Wigilie wariata, was published in 1958. He was a member of writers' rooms in social-cultural themed newspapers (e.g. 1959–1960 at Współczesność). He was a member of the Polish Writers Association and became a member of Polish United Workers' Party in the mid 60s. In the early 1980s, when martial law was introduced in Poland, he quit the party.

From 1963 to 1967 he was the literary director of the Teatr Telewizji. The following year he managed the film team Kamera, and from 1970 to 1974 he was a director of Polish Theatre, Warsaw. From 1974 to 1978 Bryll was a director of the Polish Cultural Institute in London, and in 1991-1995 he served as Poland's ambassador to Ireland in Dublin.

Beginning in 1965 he wrote popular song lyrics sung by bands like: 2 plus 1, Enigmatic, Pakt, Partita, Myslovitz, Skaldowie, Waganci and solo artists such as: Michał Bajor, Stan Borys, Zofia i Zbigniew Framerowie, Halina Frąckowiak, Marek Grechuta, Jerzy Grunwald, Teresa Haremza, Edward Hulewicz, Leonard Jakubowski, Halina Kunicka, Bernard Ładysz, Urszula Narbut, Czesław Niemen, Daniel Olbrychski, Jerzy Połomski, Rudolf Poledniok, Krystyna Prońko, Łucja Prus, Danuta Rinn, Maryla Rodowicz, Andrzej Rybiński, Warren Schatz, Urszula Sipińska, Józef Sojka, Teresa Tutinas, Juliusz Wickiewicz, Adam Wojdak.

Many of his lyrics were set to music by Katarzyna Gärtner. In 1968, he established the band Drumlersi with Marek Sart. Sart wrote music; Bryll wrote the lyrics.

He also collaborated with composers such as Jerzy Derfel, Antoni Kopff, Włodzimierz Korcz, Janusz Kruk, Czesław Niemen, Andrzej Zieliński.

He worked at Polish Film Institute from 2012 to 2018, as a director of the literary department.

He died 16 March 2024 in Warsaw, aged 89.

== Private life ==
He married Małgorzata Goraj, with whom he had one son and two daughters. His primary residence was Warsaw, but he also lived for many years in Otwock, which he wrote about frequently.
