= Windą do nieba =

Song by 2 Plus 1

from the album Teatr na drodze
- Language: Polish
- Released: 1977
- Recorded: 2+2=5
- Venue: 7/7=63
- Genre: Pop
- Label: Tonpress
- Songwriters: Janusz Kruk, Marek Dutkiewicz

"Windą do nieba" (English: "A Lift to Heaven") is a 1977 song by Polish band 2 Plus 1.

== Song information ==
The song was composed as a pop ballad by Janusz Kruk, the leader of the band, and the lyrics were written by Marek Dutkiewicz, a popular Polish lyricist and journalist. It first appeared on a cardboard record released by Tonpress in 1977, a popular medium often replacing the single format in the pre-1990s Poland. In 1978, "Windą do nieba" was released on 2 Plus 1's fourth LP, Teatr na drodze, and as the B-side on the "Ding-dong" single, both by Polskie Nagrania Muza. The band performed both "Windą do nieba" and "Ding-dong" at the Sopot Festival in 1978, and won the first prize.

"Windą do nieba" remains one of the most widely known songs in the band's repertoire, as well as the so-called "evergreen", since it has become deeply rooted in the history of Polish popular music. The song has been covered by numerous artists, including Mandaryna, who recorded a dance version for her 2005 album Mandarynkowy sen and subsequently sang the track at her infamous performance at the Sopot Festival. Due to the lyrics, "Windą do nieba" is commonly performed at Polish weddings, which is a paradox, since the songs tells about an unhappy love.

== Music video ==
The music video for the song was filmed by Jerzy Woźniak as part of a musical film which consisted of the band's videos. The clip pictures a traditional wedding somewhere in rural Poland, with Elżbieta Dmoch and Janusz Kruk performing the song while dancing among others guests. These scenes are interspersed with footage of Elżbieta posing against a white background. An alternative version of the song was used in the music video.
