= Mandarynkowy sen =

Studio album by Mandaryna
- Released: August 2005
- Genre: Pop/Dance
- Length: 40:15
- Label: Universal

Mandaryna chronology
Mandaryna.com (2004)	Mandarynkowy sen (2005)	AOK (2009)

Singles from Mandarynkowy Sen
- 1. "Ev'ry Night" Released: 2005; 2. "You Give Love A Bad Name" Released: 2005

Mandarynkowy sen is the second studio album by Polish singer and dancer Mandaryna, released in 2005.

== Background ==
The album was also known in Poland as Mandaryna.com2me and its original Polish title translates Tangerine Dream. The album's lead single "Ev'ry Night" became Mandaryna's biggest hit. Featured are also covers of Bon Jovi's "You Give Love a Bad Name" and Chris de Burgh's "A Spaceman Came Travelling", released as the follow-up singles. Furthermore, the album includes a cover of 2 Plus 1's "Windą do nieba".

Mandarynkowy sen reached number 1 in Poland (see: List of number-one albums of 2005 (Poland)).

== Track listing ==
Mandarynkowy sen
No.	Title	Music	Length
1.	"Ev'ry Night"	Harald Reitinger, Uli Fisher	3:07
2.	"Windą do nieba"	Janusz Kruk, Marek Dutkiewicz	3:56
3.	"You Give Love a Bad Name"	Jon Bon Jovi, Desmond Child, Richard S. Sambora	3:19
4.	"A Spaceman Came Travelling"	Chris de Burgh	3:43
5.	"Po prostu chcę"	Harald Reitinger, Michał Wiśniewski	4:07
6.	"I Wanna Fly"	Harald Reitinger, Uli Fisher	4:24
7.	"Esta noche"	Harald Reitinger, Uli Fisher, Torrey	3:26
8.	"Don't Say Goodbye"	Harald Reitinger, Uli Fisher	3:14
9.	"Stay Forever"	Harald Reitinger, Uli Fisher	3:14
10.	"Possession"	Harald Reitinger, Uli Fisher	3:33
11.	"I Don't Wanna Fall in Love"	Harald Reitinger, Uli Fisher	4:07

== Release history ==
Country	Date
Poland	August 2005
United States	August 2005
Indonesia	September 2005
Italy	October 2005
Austria	November 2005
Germany	November 2005
