= Iść w stronę słońca =

Song by 2 Plus 1
- Language: Polish
- Released: 1981
- Genre: Pop
- Length: 4:13
- Label: Tonpress
- Songwriters: Janusz Kruk, Andrzej Mogielnicki

"Iść w stronę słońca" is a 1981 song by Polish band 2 Plus 1.

== Song information ==
The song was composed by the band's leader Janusz Kruk, and the lyrics were written by Andrzej Mogielnicki, a popular Polish lyricist. It was first released on a cardboard record by Tonpress in 1981, a popular medium often replacing the single format in the pre-1990s Poland. In the same year, the track appeared on a various artists EP VIII konkurs na piosenkę dla młodzieży, which also included songs by such popular Polish acts as Izabela Trojanowska and Kombi. A live version of the song was included on 2 Plus 1's 1986 compilation Greatest Hits Live, and the studio recording on the 1991's 18 Greatest Hits. "Iść w stronę słońca" is regarded as one of 2 Plus 1's biggest hits, as well as the so-called "evergreen", since it has become deeply rooted in the history of Polish popular music.

== Music video ==
The music video for the song pictures the band strolling around the forest and along Vistula.
