= Andrzej Rybiński =

Polish singer, guitarist and composer (born 1949)

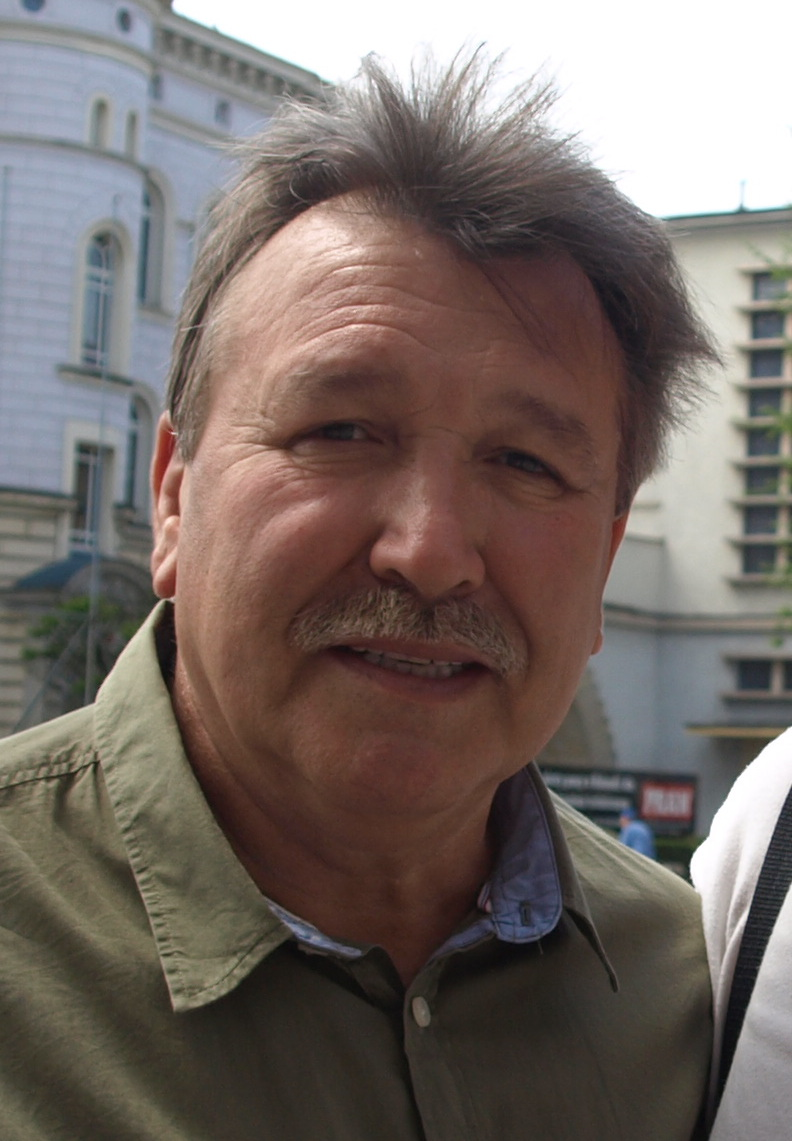
- Born: October 30, 1949 (age 76); Łódź, Poland
- Education: Secondary Music School, Łódź
- Known for: Nie liczę godzin i lat
- Website: andrzejrybinski.com.pl

Andrzej Rybiński (born 30 October 1949 in Łódź) is a Polish singer, guitarist and composer. He graduated from the piano class in Secondary Music School in Łódź. In the early 70s, with Janusz Kruk and Elżbieta Dmoch, he co-created 2 plus 1 band. In June 1971, with his wife Eliza Grochowiecka and Zbigniew Hołdys, he founded his own group – Andrzej i Eliza. The group debuted in 1971 at the 9th National Polish Song Festival in Opole with the song Wstawanie wczesnym rankiem. After the breakup of the band in July 1981, Andrzej Rybiński started his solo career. In 1983 he was awarded at the 20th National Festival of Polish Songs in Opole for the famous song Nie liczę godzin i lat.
