= Greatest Hits Live (2 Plus 1 album) =

Compilation album by 2 Plus 1
- Released: 1986
- Recorded: 1972–1984
- Genre: Pop, folk, new wave
- Length: 43:11
- Label: PolJazz

2 Plus 1 chronology
| Video (1985) | Greatest Hits Live (1986) | Antidotum (1989) |

Greatest Hits Live is a compilation album by Polish group 2 Plus 1, released in 1986 by PolJazz. The album included some of the band's greatest hits, and was divided into two parts. Side one consisted of selected hits from the 1970s, which were studio recordings with added applause, and side two featured excerpts from an actual live performance at the Warsaw Congress Hall in 1984. The cassette version of the album was known as The Best Of. The album hasn't been released on CD.

== Track listing ==
Side A:

1. "Chodź, pomaluj mój świat" – 3:07
2. "Wyspa dzieci" – 4:13
3. "Odpłyniesz wielkim autem" – 3:20
4. "Windą do nieba" – 4:31
5. "California mon amour" – 2:45
6. "Taksówka nr 5" – 4:03

Side B:

1. "Iść w stronę słońca" – 4:29
2. "Kalkuta nocą" – 4:12
3. "Gdy grali dla nas Rolling Stones" – 4:28
4. "XXI wiek (Dla wszystkich nas)" – 3:53
5. "Superszczur" – 4:10
