= Skowron =

Skowron (less commonly Skowroń) is a surname. It is derived from the Polish noun skowron ("hoopoe-lark"). The surname may refer to:

- Alf Skowron, Canadian politician
- Bill Skowron (1930–2012), American baseball player
- Chip Skowron, American hedge fund portfolio manager convicted of insider trading
- Dorota Skowron, Polish astronomer
- Joanna Skowroń (born 1979), Polish sprint canoer
- Łukasz Skowron (born 1991), Polish footballer

== See also ==
- Skowroński
