= Bez limitu =

Studio album by 2 Plus 1
- Released: 1983
- Recorded: 1982–1983
- Genre: Synthpop; rock; new wave
- Length: 38:31
- Label: Tonpress
- Producer: Janusz Kruk

2 Plus 1 chronology
Warsaw Nights (1981)	Bez limitu (1983)	Video (1985)

Professional ratings
Review scores
Source	Rating
Matuk Lon	4.5/5 stars
Tylko Rock	3/5 stars

Bez limitu (English: No Limit) is the eighth studio album by the Polish musical group 2 Plus 1, released in 1983 by Tonpress.

The LP saw a departure from the band's previous pop-folk style in favour of more new wave-oriented music. It was recorded during the martial law in Poland and showcased political lyrics, all written by Andrzej Mogielnicki. Bez limitu met with positive critical reception and commercial success. In early 1984, it was awarded with gold certification for selling over 150,000 copies. It spawned the hits "Requiem dla samej siebie", "XXI wiek (dla wszystkich nas)" and "Superszczur".

The album was reissued on CD by Agencja Artystyczna MTJ in 2003, and again on LP in 2019.

== Track listing ==
Side A:

1. "Krach" – 3:56
2. "Gorące telefony" – 3:38
3. "China Boy" – 3:44
4. "Boogie o 7 zbójach" – 3:14
5. "Nic nie boli" – 4:09

Side B:

1. "Requiem dla samej siebie" – 4:07
2. "Superszczur" – 3:53
3. "Gdy grali dla nas Rolling Stones" – 4:47
4. "Hallo panie Freud" – 3:08
5. "XXI wiek (dla wszystkich nas)" – 3:51

== Personnel ==
2 Plus 1:

- Elżbieta Dmoch – vocals
- Janusz Kruk – vocals, guitar, drums, keyboards
- Cezary Szlązak – vocals, saxophone, keyboards

Accompanying musicians:

- Bogusław Mietniowski – bass guitar
- Wacław Laskowski – drums
- Jerzy Suchocki – drums, keyboards
- Krzysztof Słodkiewicz – guitar

== Certifications ==
Region	Certification	Sales
Poland	Gold	150,000
