= Wyspa dzieci =

Studio album by 2 Plus 1
- Released: 1975
- Genre: Pop, folk
- Length: 37:05
- Label: Polskie Nagrania Muza
- Producer: Janusz Kruk

2 Plus 1 chronology
| Nowy wspaniały świat (1972) | Wyspa dzieci (1975) | Aktor (1977) |

Wyspa dzieci (English: The Island of Children) is the second studio album by Polish group 2 Plus 1, released in 1975 by Polskie Nagrania Muza. The LP was a concept album, discussing issues faced by children and teenagers. The album included a number of hit songs: "Kołysanka matki", "Na luzie" and "Gwiazda dnia", the latter recorded for the 1973 film In Desert and Wilderness. The album was re-released on CD in 2001.

== Track listing ==
Side A:

1. "Wyspa dzieci" ("The Island of Children") – 4:05
2. "Gdzieś w sercu na dnie" ("Somewhere at the Bottom of Your Heart") – 2:35
3. "Kołysanka matki" ("The Mother's Lullaby") – 4:45
4. "Coraz bliżej dom" ("We're Coming Home") – 3:25
5. "Na luzie" ("Take It Easy") – 3:20

Side B:

1. "Bez pieniędzy" ("Without Money") – 3:50
2. "Na naszym piętrze nowina" ("There's the News on Our Storey") – 4:00
3. "A my jak dzieci" ("We're Like Children") – 3:30
4. "Song rodziców" ("Parents' Song") – 2:45
5. "Setki mil" ("Hundreds of Miles") – 3:00
6. "Gwiazda dnia" ("The Star of the Day") – 1:50
