= Antidotum =

Studio album by 2 Plus 1
- Released: 1989
- Genre: Pop rock
- Length: 37:45
- Label: Tonpress
- Producer: Janusz Kruk

2 Plus 1 chronology
| Greatest Hits Live (1986) | Antidotum (1989) | 18 Greatest Hits (1991) |

Professional ratings
Review scores
| Source | Rating |
|---|---|
| Matuk Lon | 3/5 stars |
| Tylko Rock | 2/5 stars |

Antidotum (English: Antidote) is the tenth and last studio album by the Polish musical group 2 Plus 1, released in 1989 by Tonpress. It was their first studio album in four years, and didn't match the success of previous LPs. In 2003, Antidotum was reissued on CD by Agencja Artystyczna MTJ.

== Track listing ==
Side A:

1. "Niech w tobie gra coś pięknie" – 4:10
2. "Ameryka cię zje" – 3:25
3. "Niespokojna kołysanka" – 3:45
4. "Za mało życia" – 3:40
5. "Chłodnym okiem" – 4:15

Side B:

1. "Ocalę cię" – 3:55
2. "Rock antidotum" – 4:20
3. "Przyciąganie ziemskie" – 3:55
4. "Londyński pub" – 4:15
5. "Oszczędzaj serce" – 2:05

== Personnel ==
2 Plus 1:

- Elżbieta Dmoch – vocals
- Janusz Kruk – vocals, guitar, keyboards
- Cezary Szlązak – vocals, saxophone, keyboards

Accompanying musicians:

- Jerzy Kossacz – keyboards
- Janusz Koman – keyboards
- Paweł Serafiński – synthesizer
- Maciej Latański – bass guitar
