= Aktor =

Studio album by 2 Plus 1
- Released: 1977
- Recorded: 1977
- Genre: Pop, jazz
- Label: Polskie Nagrania Muza
- Producer: Janusz Kruk

2 Plus 1 chronology
Wyspa dzieci (1975)	Aktor (1977)	Teatr na drodze (1978)

Aktor (English: Actor) is the third studio album by Polish band 2 Plus 1, released in 1977 by Polskie Nagrania Muza. The LP was a tribute to Polish actor Zbigniew Cybulski, who died in 1967. The album commemorated the 10th anniversary of his death. It wasn't a commercial success due to its less-commercial sound, but was praised by critics. The album was re-released on CD in 2001.

== Track listing ==
- Lyrics by Marek Dutkiewicz. Music written and arranged by Janusz Kruk.

Side A:

1. "Prolog" – 3:44
2. "Rozmowa z cyganką w wigilię niedzieli" – 1:35
3. "Setki mil" – 3:27
4. "Stop-klatka" – 2:59
5. "Song dziewczyny I" – 3:13
6. "Dzień, w którym umarł film" – 3:39

Side B:

1. "Song dziewczyny II" – 2:04
2. "Ogromne zmęczenie" – 9:54
3. "Ojciec nocy, ojciec dnia" – 3:10
4. "Muzyka w serca wstąpi nam" – 3:21
- Note: Some editions of this album feature tracks 2, 3 and 4 as an extended suite.

== Personnel ==
- Elzbieta Dmoch: Flute, Vocals
- Janusz Kruk: Guitars, Piano, Vocals
- Janusz Koman: Fender Rhodes
- Cezary Szlazak: Sax, Vocals
- Adam Pilawa: Violin
- Andrzej Pawlik: Bass, Vocals
- Andrzej Wojicik: Drums
- Jozef Gawrych: Percussion
