= Every Night =

Every Night may refer to:

- Every Night (Saturday Looks Good to Me album), 2004
- Every Night (Yōsui Inoue album), 1980
- "Every Night" (EXID song), 2012
- "Every Night" (Hannah Diamond song), 2014
- "Every Night" (Pake McEntire song), 1986
- "Every Night" (Paul McCartney song), 1970
- "Ev'ry Night", a song by Mandaryna, 2005
- "Every Night", a song by Imagine Dragons from Night Visions, 2012

== See also ==
- Everynight ... Everynight, a 1994 Australian film
