= Easy Come Easy Go =

Easy Come Easy Go may refer to:

== Film and television ==
- Easy Come, Easy Go (1928 film), a film starring Richard Dix
- Easy Come, Easy Go (1947 film), a film starring Barry Fitzgerald
- Easy Come, Easy Go (1967 film), a film starring Elvis Presley
- Easy Come, Easy Go (unfinished film), a proposed film starring Jan and Dean which was abandoned in 1965
- Easy Come, Easy Go, a documentary film featuring The Easybeats, filmed in 1967, released in 2012
- "Easy Come, Easy Go" (Pennies from Heaven), a 1978 television episode
- "Easy Come, Easy Go" (Sex and the City), a 2000 television episode

== Music ==
=== Albums ===
- Easy Come, Easy Go (2 Plus 1 album) or the title song (see below), 1980
- Easy Come Easy Go (George Strait album) or the title song (see below), 1993
- Easy Come, Easy Go (Joe Public album) or the title song, 1994
- Easy Come, Easy Go (Marianne Faithfull album) or the title song, 2008
- Easy Come, Easy Go (Starflyer 59 album), 2000
- Easy Come, Easy Go (EP) or the title song (see below), by Elvis Presley, from the 1967 film

=== Songs ===
- "Easy Come, Easy Go" (2 Plus 1 song), 1979
- "Easy Come, Easy Go" (Bobby Sherman song), 1970
- "Easy Come, Easy Go" (Elvis Presley song), 1967
- "Easy Come, Easy Go" (George Strait song), 1993
- "Easy Come Easy Go" (Winger song), 1990
- "Easy Come, Easy Go!", by B'z, 1990
- "Easy Come – Easy Go", by Bill Anderson, 1964
- "Easy Come Easy Go", by Imagine Dragons from Mercury – Act 1, 2021
- "Easy Come, Easy Go", a jazz standard written by Johnny Green and Edward Heyman, 1934
- "Easy Come Easy Go", by Grant Mclennan from Watershed, 1990

== See also ==
- "Easy Comb, Easy Go", an episode of Happy Tree Friends
