= Helena Majdaniec =

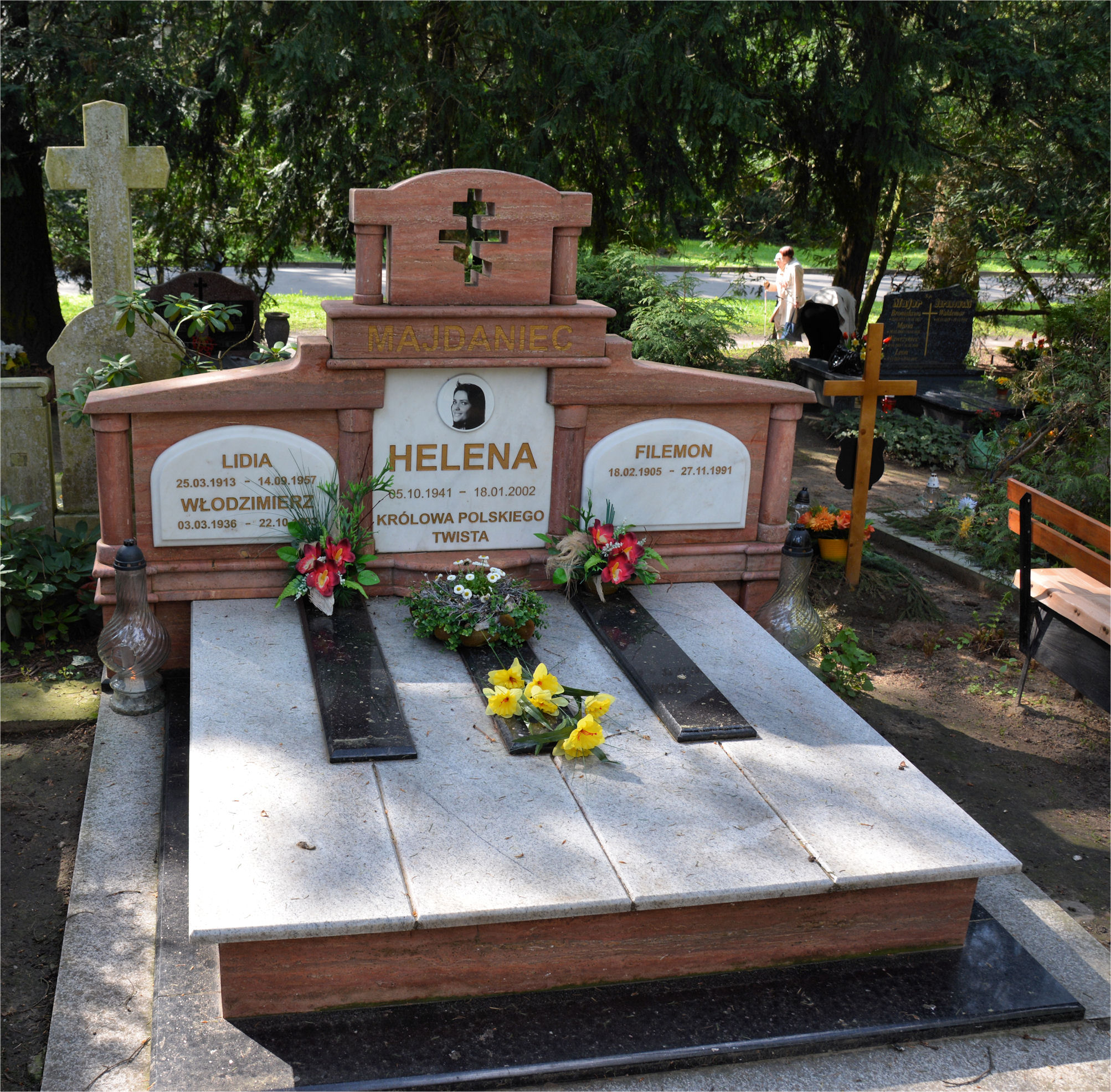
- Helena Majdaniec tombstone on Central Cemetery in Szczecin, Poland

Background information
- Born: Helena Majdaniec; 18 August 1941; Mylsk, Reichskommissariat Ukraine
- Origin: Szczecin, Poland
- Died: 18 January 2002 (aged 60) Szczecin, Poland
- Genres: Big-beat
- Occupations: Singer, actress
- Years active: 1962–2002
- Labels: Polskie Nagrania Muza, Pronit, Philips Records

Helena Majdaniec (5 October 1941 – 18 January 2002) was a Polish big beat singer and film actor, "the queen of Polish Twist". Helena Majdaniec cooperated with Niebiesko-Czarni, Czerwono-Czarni, Karin Stanek, Olivia Newton-John, Cliff Richard and Demis Roussos. She performed mainly in Szczecin and Paris.

== Personal discography ==
Her singing is also available in the albums of the music groups she cooperated with.

- 1973 – Helena Majdanec, pocztówka, R-0141-II Ruch
- 1970 – Helena Madanec 10", Philips N049, France
- 1970 – Helena Madanec, 7", Philips 6118007, France
- 1964 – Helena Majdaniec 7", Polskie Nagrania Muza N-0338
