= List of number-one albums of 2005 (Poland) =

These are the Polish number one albums of 2005, per the OLiS Chart.

== Chart history ==
Issue Date	Album	Artist(s)	Reference(s)
January 3	The Best Smooth Jazz... Ever	Różni wykonawcy	
January 10	Bravo Hits Zima 2005	Różni wykonawcy	
January 17	The Best Smooth Jazz... Ever	Różni wykonawcy	
January 24	The Best Smooth Jazz... Ever	Różni wykonawcy	
January 31	The Best Smooth Jazz... Ever	Różni wykonawcy	
February 7	The Way Up	Pat Metheny Group	
February 14	In the Room	Krzysztof Kiljański	
February 21	In the Room	Krzysztof Kiljański	
February 28	In the Room	Krzysztof Kiljański	
March 7	In the Room	Krzysztof Kiljański	
March 14	In the Room	Krzysztof Kiljański	
March 21	In the Room	Krzysztof Kiljański	
March 29	In the Room	Krzysztof Kiljański	
April 4	Top Kids 3	Różni wykonawcy	
April 11	Top Kids 3	Różni wykonawcy	
April 18	Top Kids 3	Różni wykonawcy	
April 25	Jan Paweł II - Tryptyk Rzymski	Stanisław Soyka	
May 2	Bravo Hits Wiosna 2005	Różni wykonawcy	
May 16	The Best & The Rest	Kayah	
May 23	The Best & The Rest	Kayah	
May 30	The Best & The Rest	Kayah	
June 6	The Best Smooth Jazz... Ever! vol. 2	Różni wykonawcy	
June 13	The Best Smooth Jazz... Ever! vol. 2	Różni wykonawcy	
June 20	Los się musi odmienić	Kazik	
June 27	Mini Mini Party	Różni wykonawcy	
July 4	Mini Mini Party	Różni wykonawcy	
July 13	Bravo Hits Lato 2005	Różni wykonawcy	
July 18	Bravo Hits Lato 2005	Różni wykonawcy	
July 25	Radio ZET Tylko wielkie przeboje na lato 2005	Różni wykonawcy	
August 1	Radio ZET Tylko wielkie przeboje na lato 2005	Różni wykonawcy	
August 8	Radio ZET Tylko wielkie przeboje na lato 2005	Różni wykonawcy	
August 16	Crazy Hits	Crazy Frog	
August 22	Crazy Hits	Crazy Frog	
August 29	Crazy Hits	Crazy Frog	
September 5	Mandarynkowy sen	Mandaryna	
September 12	Mandarynkowy sen	Mandaryna	
September 19	Crazy Hits	Crazy Frog	
September 26	Crazy Hits	Crazy Frog	
October 3	Jednym tchem	Andrzej Piaseczny	
October 10	A.E.I.O.U.	Sistars	
October 17	A.E.I.O.U.	Sistars	
October 24	Playing the Angel	Depeche Mode	
October 31	Playing the Angel	Depeche Mode	
November 14	Live from Gdańsk – Koncert w Stoczni	Jean Michel Jarre	
November 21	Live from Gdańsk – Koncert w Stoczni	Jean Michel Jarre	
November 28	Confessions on a Dance Floor	Madonna	
December 5	Teraz płynę	Beata Kozidrak	
December 12	Teraz płynę	Beata Kozidrak	
December 19	Poligono Industrial	Kult	
December 27	Poligono Industrial	Kult	
