= Easy Go =

Easy Go may refer to:

- Easy Go (novel), a 1968 novel by John Lange (Michael Crichton)
- "Easy Go" (song), a 2016 song by Grandtheft and Delaney Jane
- Free and Easy, a 1930 Buster Keaton comedy retitled Easy Go for syndicated television
- EasyGo, a toll-collection technology in Europe
- EasyGO, an electronic fare card used by Grand River Transit

== See also ==
- Easy Come Easy Go (disambiguation)
- E-Z-GO, an American golf cart manufacturer
