= Aleksander Baron =

Polish chef

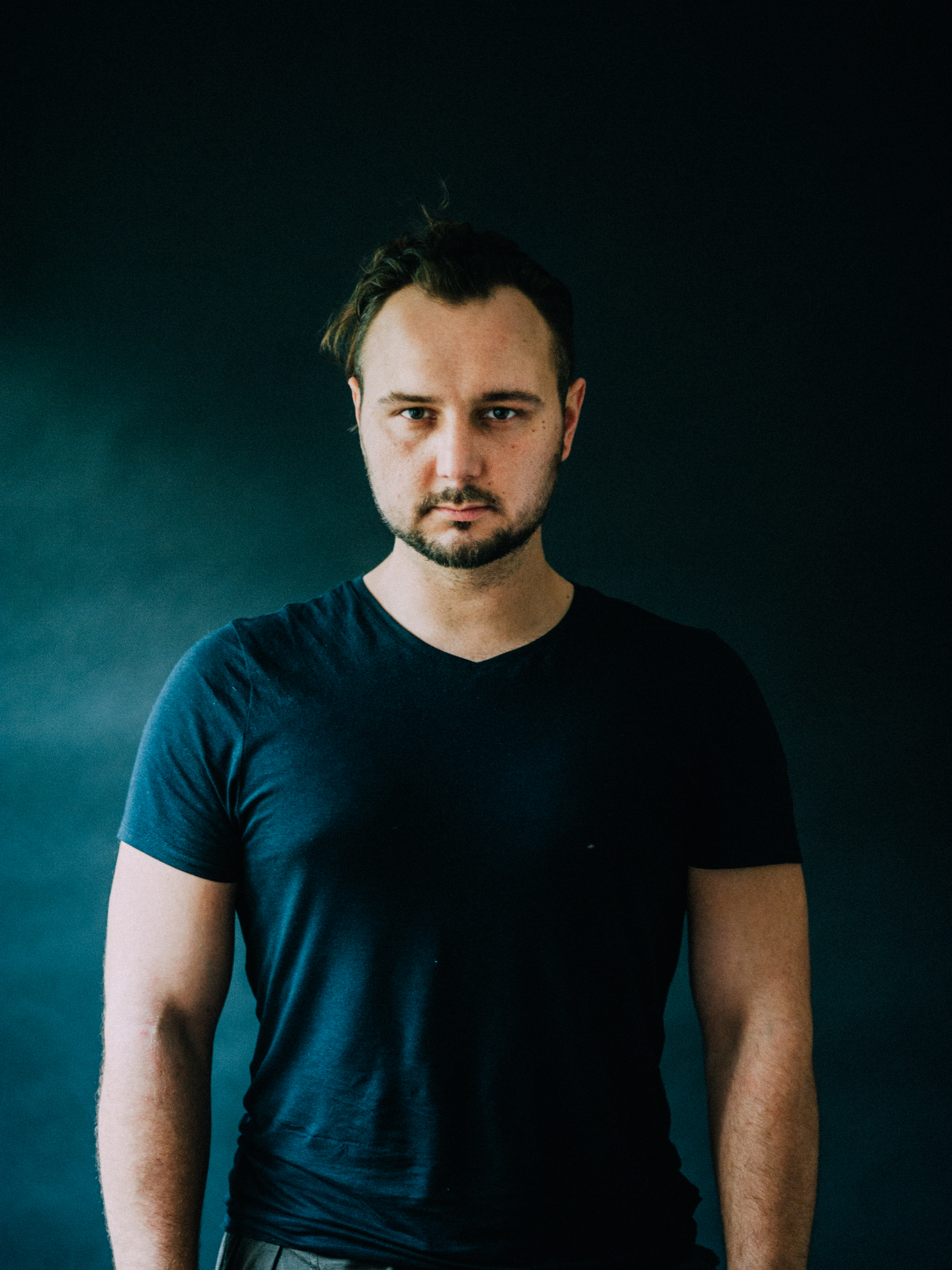
- Born: 15 January 1983 (age 43); Warsaw, Poland
- Education: Academy of Fine Arts in Warsaw
- Culinary career
- Cooking style: New Polish cuisine
- Current restaurant
- 2018 – present Zoni
- Website: aleksanderbaron.pl

Aleksander Baron (born 15 January 1983) is a Polish chef who is a head chef at Zoni restaurant in Warsaw, Poland. He previously ran a restaurant called Solec 44 also in Warsaw, Poland. He was titled 2019 Chef de L'avenir by Gault&Millau.

== Career ==
Aleksander Baron studied sculpture at the Academy of Fine Arts in Warsaw and Art History at the University of Warsaw. His cooking career started in Edinburgh, Scotland, where he spent four years. He served food on Elisabeth II birthday. After his return to Poland in 2009 he opened, together with Krytyka Polityczna a restaurant Nowy Wspaniały Świat, a year after he launched his own place Solec 44 and ran it incessantly for 8 years until its final shut down. Since 2018 he is a head chef at the restaurant Zoni operating at the Polish Vodka Museum. He is known for using seasonal products and local suppliers, and following no waste philosophy. Aleksander Baron closely cooperates with Adam Mickiewicz Institute and Polona in promoting Polish cuisine and culture, and POLIN Museum of the History of Polish Jews where he explores Ashkenazi cuisine. He is also known for promoting and reinventing tradition of food fermentations what he described in his book "Kiszonki i Fermentacje" and hosted Elix Sandor Katz's visit in Poland. Besides being a chef he is a food studies lecturer at SWPS University of Social Sciences and Humanities, food writer and TV presenter at Kuchnia+.

== Events and festivals ==
- 2013 Fête de la Gastronomie, Paris, France
- 2015 Transatlantyk Festival Łodź, Poland
- 2017 Jeju Food and Wine Festival, Jeju, South Korea
- 2017 Seongbuk Global Food Festival Nurimashil, Seoul, South Korea
- 2017 London Book Fair, London, UK

== Published works ==
- Baron, Aleksander (2015). Suwała, Baron i inni. Przepisy i opowieści. Warsaw: Dwie siostry. ISBN 978-8363696757.
- Baron, Aleksander (2016). Suwała, Kiszonki i fermentacje. Bielsko-Biała: Wydawnictwo Pascal. ISBN 978-8376429250.
- Baron, Aleksander (2017). Między wódką a zakąską. Bielsko-Biała: Wydawnictwo Pascal. ISBN 978-8381031073.
