= Statue of Helena Majdaniec =

Monument in Szczecin, Poland

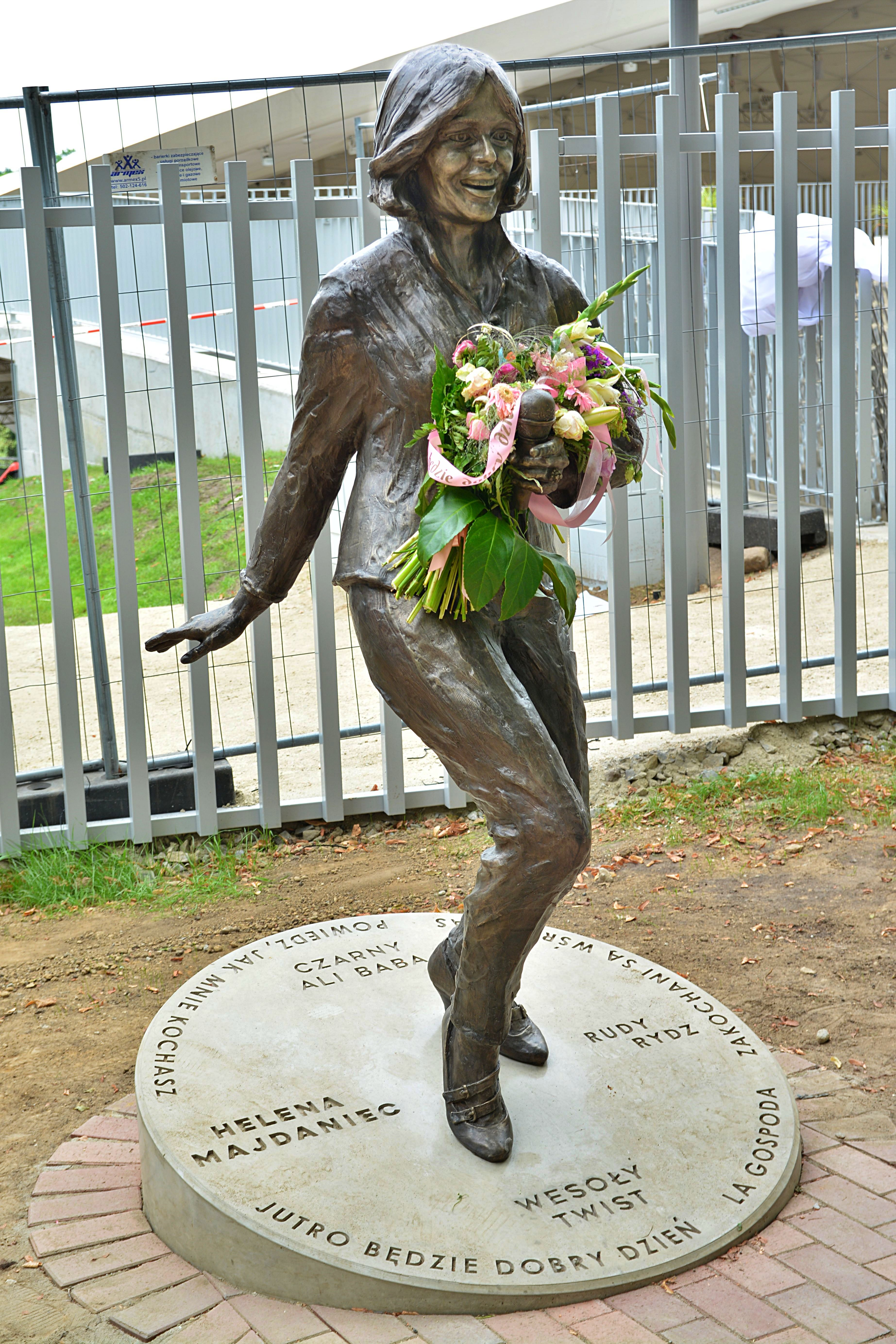
- The monument in 2022.
- Interactive map of Statue of Helena Majdaniec
- Location: 2 Fałata Street, Downtown-North, Szczecin, Poland
- Coordinates: 53°26′42.11″N 14°31′46.75″E
- Designer: Dorota Dziekiewicz-Pilich
- Type: Statue
- Material: Bronze (statue); stone (pedestal)
- Opening date: 30 July 2022
- Dedicated to: Helena Majdaniec

The statue of Helena Majdaniec (Polish: Pomnik Heleny Majdaniec) is a monument in the city of Szczecin in West Pomeranian Voivodeship, Poland. It is placed in front of Helena Majdaniec Summer Theatre on 2 Fałata Street within Jan Kasprowicz Park. The monument is located within the neighbourhood of Downtown-North within the Downtown district. It is dedicated to Helena Majdaniec (1941–2002), a 20th-century big-beat singer from Szczecin. The monument consists of a bronze statue placed on a circular stone pedestal. It was designed by Dorota Dziekiewicz-Pilich, and unveiled on 30 July 2022.

== History ==
The monument was dedicated to Helena Majdaniec (1941–2002), a 20th-century big-beat singer from Szczecin. The monument was designed by Szczecin-based sculptor Dorota Dziekiewicz-Pilich. It was unveiled on 30 July 2022 in front of Helena Majdaniec Summer Theatre, of which she is a namesake pathron, on 2 Fałata Street, within Jan Kasprowicz Park.

== Characteristics ==
The monument is placed in front of Helena Majdaniec Summer Theatre on 2 Fałata Street within Jan Kasprowicz Park. It consist of a bronze statue of Helena Majdaniec, coated with patina. She is depicted wearing a suit with high-heeled shoes, while signing and dancing, and holding a microphone in her right hand near her stomach. The statue is placed on a white stone pedestal with a circular base, stylised to resemble a vinyl record. It is cut askew towards the front and bares titules of several of her songs, inscribed on the top. The songs inscribed alongside it edge are: "Powiedz, jak mnię kochasz" (lit. 'Tell me, how do you love me', "Zakochani są wśród nas" (lit. 'the lovers are among us'), "La Gospoda" (lit. 'the tavern' preceded by a Spanish article "la", lit. 'the'), and "Jutro będzie doby dzień" (lit. 'Tomorrow will be a good day'). The songs inscribed around the base of the statue are: "Czarny Ali Baba" (lit. 'Black Ali Baba'"), "Rudy Rydz" (lit. 'red pine mushroom'), and "Wesoły twist" (lit. 'the happy twist'). It also bares her name, Helena Majdaniec. The monument measures 2.2 m (7.22 ft), and it has a diameter of 1.1 m (3.61 ft).
