= 18 Greatest Hits =

18 Greatest Hits may refer to:

- 18 Greatest Hits (2 Plus 1 album), 1991
- 18 Greatest Hits (Jaya album), 2009
- 18 Greatest Hits (Sandra album), 1992
- 18 Greatest Hits (Michael Jackson album), 1983
