= AOK =

AOK may refer to:

== Language ==
- A-ok, an expression popularized by Shorty Powers
- A-OK hand gesture, symbolized by a joined thumb and forefinger with remaining fingers extended

== Places ==
- Karpathos Island National Airport, IATA airport code

== Organizations ==
- Armeeoberkommando, the name of various army commands in the Austro-Hungarian army and German army, especially in the world wars
- PAE Kerkyra, a Greek football club, known as PAE AOK Kerkyra since 2012
- A.O. Karditsa F.C., a Greek football club commonly called by their abbreviated name "AOK"

== Arts and entertainment ==
- AOK (album), Mandaryna's album, or the title track
- "A-O-K" (song), a 2021 song by Tai Verdes
- "A-OK", a song by Australian band Violent Soho from their 2020 album Everything Is A-OK

== Games ==
- Age of Empires II: The Age of Kings computer game
- Age of Empires: The Age of Kings Nintendo DS game

== Other uses ==
- Assisted-opening knife

== See also ==
- Ayokay
