= Teatr na drodze =

Studio album by 2 Plus 1
- Released: 1978
- Recorded: 1978
- Genre: Pop, folk
- Label: Polskie Nagrania Muza
- Producer: Janusz Kruk

2 Plus 1 chronology
Aktor (1977)	Teatr na drodze (1978)	Irlandzki tancerz (1979)

Teatr na drodze (English: Performance on the Road) is the fourth studio album by Polish group 2 Plus 1, released in 1978 by Polskie Nagrania Muza. The LP included one of the band's greatest hits, "Windą do nieba", as well as duet with Czesław Niemen, "Ballada łomżyńska". In 2001 the album was reissued in CD format.

== Track listing ==
Side A:

1. "Ding-dong" ("Free Me")
2. "Windą do nieba" ("A Lift to Heaven")
3. "California mon amour"
4. "Dokąd idziesz, kochanie" ("Where Are You Going, Dear")
5. "U nas już po burzy" ("It's All Over")

Side B:

1. "Romanse za grosz" ("Two Penny Romance")
2. "Podobny do ludzi" ("Similar to Others")
3. "Teatr na drodze" ("Performance on the Road")
4. "Ballada łomżyńska" ("The Ballad from Łomża")
5. "O leli lo!"
6. "Komu w oczach słońce" ("To Whom the Sun Beams")

== Personnel ==
- Elżbieta Dmoch: Vocals, Flute
- Janusz Kruk: Vocals, Guitars, Piano
- Zbigniew Hołdys: Guitars
- Janusz Koman: Fender Rhodes
- Czesław Niemen: Synthi EMS, Moog Piano, Vocals
- Cezary Szlązak: Mellotron, Saxophone, Vocals
- Andrzej Pawlik: Bass
- Wacław Laskowski: Drums
- Józef Gawrych: Percussion
