= Skowroński =

Skowroński (feminine Skowrońska) is a Polish surname. It is a habitational name for someone from a place called Skowronów, Skowronna, Skowron, or Skowronki, all named with Polish skowronek ("skylark") or skowron ("hoopoe-lark"). In some cases, it is a modification of the surname Skowron, with the suffix added in imitation of noble surnames (see Suffix -ski/-ska).

Notable people with this surname include:

- Andrzej Skowroński (1953–2020), Polish rower
- Anna Bogucka-Skowrońska (born 1942), Polish politician
- Birth surname of Bob Skoronski (1934–2018), American football player
- Janina Skowronska (1920–1992), Polish composer
- Katarzyna Skowrońska (born 1983), Polish volleyball player
- Ken Skowronski (born 1938), American politician
- Krystyna Skowrońska (born 1954), Polish politician
- Krzysztof Skowroński (born 1965), Polish journalist
- Catherine I (1684–1727, née Marta Helena Skowrońska), Empress of Russia
- Paweł Skowroński (born 1984), Polish canoer
- Wojciech Skowroński (1941–2002), Polish singer
- Zbigniew Skowroński (1925–1991), Polish bobsledder

== See also ==
- Skoronski (surname)
