= Chodź, pomaluj mój świat =

Song by 2 Plus 1

from the album Nowy wspaniały świat
- Language: Polish
- Released: 1972
- Genre: Pop
- Length: 3:00
- Label: Polskie Nagrania Muza
- Composer: Janusz Kruk
- Lyricist: Marek Dutkiewicz
- Producer: Janusz Kruk

"Chodź, pomaluj mój świat" (English: "Come (On,) Paint My World") is a 1971 song by Polish band 2 Plus 1.

== Song information ==
"Chodź, pomaluj mój świat" was composed by Janusz Kruk, the leader of the band, and the lyrics were written by Marek Dutkiewicz, a popular Polish lyricist and journalist. The song was written and performed as early as 1971, but it was not officially released until 1972, when it appeared on a cardboard record, a popular format in the pre-1990s Poland, and subsequently on the band's debut LP, Nowy wspaniały świat.

The song reached number 1 on Rozgłośnia Harcerska's radio chart in late 1971, and would become one of the biggest hits of 2 Plus 1's entire career as well as a so-called "evergreen", since it has become deeply rooted in the history of Polish popular music.

== Music video ==
Two music videos for "Chodź, pomaluj mój świat" exist. The first version was a studio clip picturing the band performing the song in front of a plain background. Another version used a concert footage of 2 Plus 1 performing the song live, with shots of colourful decorative glass being blow-moulded.
