= 18 Greatest Hits (2 Plus 1 album) =

Compilation album by 2 Plus 1
- Released: 1991
- Recorded: 1972–1984
- Genre: Pop, folk, new wave
- Length: 43:11
- Label: Sonic

2 Plus 1 chronology
Antidotum (1989)	18 Greatest Hits (1991)

18 Greatest Hits is a compilation album by Polish group 2 Plus 1, released in 1991 by Sonic Records. It was 2 Plus 1's first album released directly on CD, and their last authorised release in the original line-up, before Janusz Kruk's death in 1992. Branded as a greatest hits album, the CD featured majority of the band's most notable hits, although ignored their English-language material. The album was re-released as 21 Greatest Hits five years later with slightly altered track listing, and the original 1991 issue is now a rare collector's item.

== Track listing ==
1. "Chodź, pomaluj mój świat"
2. "Czerwone słoneczko"
3. "Wstawaj, szkoda dnia"
4. "Na luzie"
5. "Wyspa dzieci"
6. "Windą do nieba"
7. "California mon amour"
8. "Taksówka nr 5"
9. "Z popiołu i wosku"
10. "Iść w stronę słońca"
11. "Obłędu chcę"
12. "Kalkuta nocą"
13. "Nic nie boli"
14. "Requiem (dla samej siebie)"
15. "Superszczur"
16. "XXI wiek"
17. "Gdy grali dla nas Rolling Stones"
18. "Wielki mały człowiek"
