= Nowy wspaniały świat =

Studio album by 2 Plus 1
- Released: 1972
- Genres: Pop, folk
- Length: 37:47 (LP); 51:49 (1995 CD)
- Label: Polskie Nagrania Muza
- Producer: Janusz Kruk

2 Plus 1 chronology
Nowy wspaniały świat (1972)	Wyspa dzieci (1975)

Nowy wspaniały świat (English: The New Magnificent World) is the debut studio album by Polish group 2 Plus 1, released in 1972 by Polskie Nagrania Muza. It contained some of the band's greatest hits: "Chodź, pomaluj mój świat", "Czerwone słoneczko", "Hej dogonię lato" and "Wstawaj szkoda dnia". The album turned out a huge commercial success and was certified Gold in Poland for selling in over 150,000 copies. It was re-released on CD twice: in 1995, with a slightly altered cover and 5 bonus tracks, and in 2001, retaining the original cover and standard track listing.

== Track listing ==
Side A:

1. "Czerwone słoneczko" ("The Red Sun") – 2:48
2. "Nowy wspaniały świat" ("The New Magnificent World") – 2:45
3. "Pani moich godzin" ("The Lady of My Hours") – 3:18
4. "Zielona droga" ("On the Green Road") – 3:03
5. "W kamień zaklęci" ("Turned to Stone") – 2:17
6. "Kiedy rzeką płynie kra" ("When Ice Floats Down the River") – 0:56
7. "Gwiazdo wód" ("Star of Waters") – 3:33

Side B:

1. "Hej dogonię lato" ("I'll Catch the Summer") – 3:13
2. "Wstawaj szkoda dnia" ("Wake Up, Don't Waste the Day") – 2:55
3. "Chodź, pomaluj mój świat" ("Come On, Paint My World") – 3:00
4. "Jasny, biały dzień" ("Bright Day, White Day") – 3:05
5. "Po jedwabnej stronie" ("On the Silk Side") – 3:42
6. "Wrócimy tam któregoś ranka" ("We'll Get Back There Some Day") – 3:12

Bonus tracks (1995 CD reissue):

1. "Codzienność" – 3:17
2. "Panna radosna" – 2:11
3. "Śpij, baju baju" – 2:52
4. "Już nie będę taki głupi" – 2:32
5. "Nie zmogła go kula" – 1:58
