= Irlandzki tancerz =

Studio album by 2 Plus 1
- Released: 1979
- Genre: Pop, folk
- Length: 37:50
- Label: Wifon
- Producer: Janusz Kruk

2 Plus 1 chronology
Teatr na drodze (1978)	Irlandzki tancerz (1979)	Easy Come, Easy Go (1980)

Irlandzki tancerz (English: The Irish Dancer) is the fifth album by Polish group 2 Plus 1, released in 1979 by Wifon. It was a concept album, inspired by traditional Irish folk music, and featured Polish translations of thirteen old Irish folk ballads. The album was highly successful and gathered very favourable reviews. In 2001, the album was reissued on CD with slightly different artwork.

== Track listing ==
Side A:

1. "Irlandzki tancerz" – 2:00
2. "Idę na zachód zielony" – 2:30
3. "O Boże, Munster pobłogosław" – 2:50
4. "Do Valentine Brown" – 4:05
5. "Kraina Mayo" – 2:25
6. "Bezdzietność" – 4:05
7. "Lament na śmierć Williama Gould" – 2:10

Side B:

1. "Peggy Brown" – 3:10
2. "Ja Ewa" – 2:10
3. "Ona jest panią moją" – 3:55
4. "Bally na Lee" – 4:05
5. "Waszmość Coughlenie" – 1:20
6. "Na zabicie Davida Gleesona" – 3:05
