= Mandaryna.com =

Studio album by Mandaryna
- Released: August 2004
- Recorded: 2004
- Genres: Pop, dance
- Length: 47:27
- Label: Magic

Mandaryna chronology
Mandaryna.com (2004)	Mandarynkowy sen (2005)

Singles from Mandaryna.com
- 1. "Here I Go Again" Released: 2004; 2. "L'ete Indien" Released: 2004

Mandaryna.com is the debut album by Polish singer, dancer and actress Mandaryna, released in 2004.

The album included covers of "Here I Go Again" by Whitesnake, "L'Été indien" by Joe Dassin and "Bo z dziewczynami" by Jerzy Połomski. "Here I Go Again" and "L'Été indien" were released as singles in 2004 and became successful in Poland.

Mandaryna.com reached number 8 in Polish albums chart and was certified gold in Poland.

In 2021, a remastered version of the album called "Mandaryna One" was released.

== Track listing ==
1. "Here I Go Again" – 3:07
2. "L'Été indien" – 3:51
3. "Drifting" – 3:32
4. "I Feel the Rhythm" – 3:27
5. "Lost in Your Eyes" – 3:57
6. "Jeanny" – 4:00
7. "Mueve tu cuerpo loco" – 3:30
8. "Bo z dziewczynami" – 3:48
9. "Sun" – 3:29
10. "Just Kiss Me" – 3:57
11. "Always" – 3:56
12. "Love Is Just a Game" – 3:45
13. "Jesteś ale cię nie ma" – 3:08

== Release history ==
Country	Date
Poland	August 2004
Austria	October 2004
