= Czerwono-Czarni =

Polish rock band

- Origin: Gdańsk
- Genres: "big beat" (pop rock, beat music)
- Years active: 22 June 1960–1976

Czerwono-Czarni (Polish pronunciation: [t͡ʂɛrˌvɔnɔˈt͡ʂarɲi]; literally: "the Red-and-Blacks") was one of the most popular rock bands in the history of Polish popular music, and one of the pioneers of rock and beat music in Poland (both styles together known as the "Big Beat" in the Eastern Bloc at the times). Czerwono-Czarni was the first Polish rock band to last long enough to cut a record. It formed in 1960, and lasted until 1976.

== History and influence ==
The Polish rock scene dates from 1959, when the short-lived Rhythm and Blues band debuted. Rhythm and Blues soon disbanded, but most of its members on the same day formed the Czerwono-Czarni group. Czerwono-Czarni was founded by Franciszek Walicki on 22 June 1960 in Gdańsk, first performed on 23 July that year, and operated until 1976. They were the first band to record a rock-n-roll (at the time called "big beat" in Poland, which was more politically acceptable than the term "rock-n-roll", which was seen as subversive by the communist authorities) record in Poland, in 1961, in Warsaw, in the concert hall of the National Polish Philharmonic, which at night served as a recording studio. The 1961 release was the group's first.

Original members included Zbigniew Garsen (Zbigniew Wilk), Marek Tarnowski, Mirosław Wójcik - saksofon tenorowy, Andrzej Jordan and Michaj Burano. This changed shortly afterwards, and notable artists who performed in the group included W. Bernolak (Polanie), Seweryn Krajewski (Czerwone Gitary), Zbigniew Podgajny (Niebiesko-Czarni), Zbigniew Bizoń, Przemysław Gwoździowski, Piotr Puławski (Polanie), Ryszard Poznakowski, Henryk Zomerski, Tadeusz Mróz, Ryszard Gromek, Helena Majdaniec, Katarzyna Sobczyk, Karin Stanek, Wojciech Gąssowski, Toni Keczer, Maciej Kossowski. Over 70 artists worked with the group during its 16-year history.

Their notable songs include: Trzynastego ("The Thirteenth"), O mnie się nie martw ("Don't Worry About Me"), Chłopiec z gitarą ("A Boy With A Guitar"), Jedziemy autostopem ("Hitchhiking") and Malowana lala ("Painted Doll").

The group received numerous awards in the National Festival of Polish Song in Opole and Sopot Festival. On 13 April 1967 they performed as an opening act for the Rolling Stones in Warsaw. Czerwono-Czarni performed at their 50th anniversary concert in 2010.

== Discography ==
- 1961 – Czerwono-Czarni (EP, Pronit N-0169)
- 1962 – Karin Stanek, Czerwono-Czarni (SP, Muza SP-323)
- 1962 – Czerwono-Czarni: The twist (EP, Muza N-0198)
- 1963 – Helena Majdaniec, Czerwono-Czarni (EP, Muza N-0237)
- 1963 – Michaj Burano, Czerwono-Czarni (EP, Pronit N-0238)
- 1963 – Czerwono-Czarni (EP, Muza N-0236)
- 1963 – Karin Stanek, Czerwono-Czarni (EP, Pronit N-0257)
- 1963 – Karin Stanek, Czerwono-Czarni (EP, Pronit N-0289)
- 1964 – Maciej Kossowski, Czerwono – Czarni (EP, Pronit, N 0302)
- 1964 – Czerwono-Czarni (EP, Muza N-0304)
- 1965 – Katarzyna Sobczyk, Czerwono-Czarni (EP, Muza N-0383)
- 1966 – Czerwono-Czarni (SP, Pronit SP-170)
- 1966 – Katarzyna Sobczyk, Czerwono-Czarni (SP, Pronit SP-169)
- 1966 – Czerwono-Czarni (EP, Pronit N-0447)
- 1966 – Czerwono-Czarni (LP, Muza SXL-0352)
- 1967 – Toni Keczer, Czerwono-Czarni (SP, Pronit SP-179)
- 1967 – Toni Keczer, Czerwono-Czarni (EP, Muza N-0469)
- 1967 – Czerwono-Czarni (EP, Muza N-0470)
- 1967 – 17.000.000 (LP, Muza SXL-0458)
- 1968 – Katarzyna Sobczyk, Czerwono-Czarni (SP, Pronit SP-234)
- 1968 – Czerwono-Czarni: Katarzyna Gaertner – Pan przyjacielem moim – msza beatowa (LP, Muza SXL-0475)
- 1968 – Czerwono-Czarni (EP, Muza N-0526)
- 1968 – Czerwono-Czarni: Zakochani są sami na świecie (LP, Pronit XL-0491)
- 1970 – Jacek Lech, Czerwono-Czarni (EP, Muza N-0618)
- 1984 – Czerwono-Czarni: Czerwono-Czarni – Z archiwum polskiego beatu vol. 1 (LP, Muza SX-2198; reedycja płyty XL0352)
- 1984 – Czerwono-Czarni: 17.000.000. – Z archiwum polskiego beatu vol. 2 (LP, Muza SX-2199)
