= Skoronski =

Skoronski is a surname of Polish descent. Notable people with the surname include:

- Anthony Skoronski (1920–1992), American thoroughbred jockey
- Bob Skoronski (1934–2018), American football player
- Ed Skoronski (1910–1996), American football player
- Peter Skoronski (born 2001), American football player

== See also ==
- Skowronski
