= Jacek Lech =

Polish singer

Jacek Lech (born Leszek Zerhau; 15 April 1947 in Bielsko-Biała – 25 March 2007 in Katowice) was a popular Polish singer.

== Biography ==
In 1966, he joined the group Czerwono-Czarni. The song Bądź dziewczyną moich marzeń ("Be the girl of my dreams") became an instant hit in Poland. In 1967 he received an award at the National Festival of Polish Song in Opole for the song Pozwólcie śpiewać ptakom ("Let the birds sing"). In 1972, he left Czerwono-Czarni.

In 1973, Lech was injured in a car accident and took a year off to recuperate. In 1974, he released his first solo album, Bądź szczęśliwa.

In 2006, Lech was diagnosed with esophageal cancer. In February 2007, a special concert was organized to help cover the costs of his treatment. Lech also received a Lifetime Achievement Award from the Polish Ministry of Culture.

He died on 25 March 2007.

== Discography ==
- 1970 – Bądź dziewczyną z moich marzeń
- 1974 – Bądź szczęśliwa
- 1977 – Latawce porwał wiatr
- 1998 – Kolędy
