= Karin Stanek =

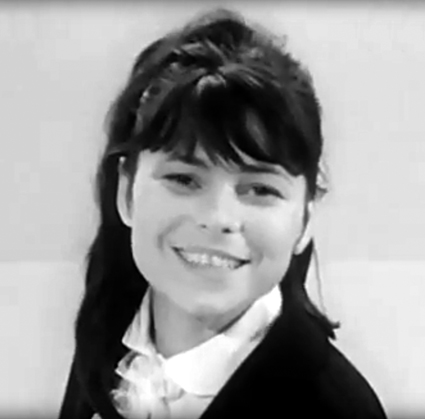
- Karin Stanek in 1967

Background information
- Born: August 18, 1943; Beuthen, Upper Silesia, Germany
- Died: February 15, 2011 (aged 67) Wolfenbüttel, Germany
- Genres: Big-beat, beat music, rock and roll
- Occupation: Singer
- Instrument: Guitar
- Years active: 1962–2005
- Labels: Polskie Nagrania Muza, Pronit, Tonpress
- Formerly of: Czerwono-Czarni
- Website: http://karin-stanek.de.to/

Karin Stanek (August 18, 1943 – February 15, 2011) was a Polish rock and roll and beat music singer, a member of the band Czerwono-Czarni. She has been known for her charismatic performances and expressive onstage persona, and referred to as one of the symbols of Polish beat music. In the 1960s, she has achieved widespread popularity in Poland with hits like "Malowana lala", "Jimmy Joe", "Chłopiec z gitarą", "Wala twist" and "Jedziemy autostopem". In the 1970s, Stanek emigrated to Germany, where she went on to release German- and English-language material. In the 1990s, she resumed performing in Poland to much success, although remained based in Germany up until her death from pneumonia in 2011. Polish music magazine Machina has placed her on their list of "50 best Polish female singers".

== Biography ==
Karin Stanek's actual date of birth is unclear and remains a matter of dispute. While it most likely is 1943, some sources claim that she was born in 1946 and fabricated her birth year to become formally older, thus officially eligible to work. She grew up in a poor family in Bytom in the southern region of Poland called Silesia. As a teenager, Stanek performed with local bands.

In 1962, through a national singing contest, Karin was recruited in to Czerwono-Czarni who at the time were a very popular beat band. Her first hits were "Jimmy Joe" and "Malowana lala" ("The Painted Doll"), also known as "Malowana piosenka" ("The Painted Song"). The latter Stanek performed at Sopot International Song Festival in 1962 to a euphoric reaction from the audience. In 1963, the singer performed "Chłopiec z gitarą" ("A Boy with a Guitar") at the first National Festival of Polish Song in Opole. The track received a special award from the judges and became another massive hit. She appeared as herself in two films: a documentary about hitchhiking Gdzieś w Polsce (Somewhere in Poland) in 1963, and a feature film Dwa żebra Adama (The Two Ribs of Adam) in the following year.

Stanek performed three new songs in Opole in 1964, including "Jedziemy autostopem" ("We're Hitchhiking") which also received a special award and became one of her trademark songs. She was invited to perform abroad, among others in the USA and France, but the Communist government refused to grant her permission to travel. She did, however, manage to embark on tours in Czechoslovakia and East Germany with Czerwono-Czarni in 1964, which were well-received by audiences. By 1964, she has also recorded four EPs as a solo vocalist with Czerwono-Czarni as the backing band. In 1965, Stanek performed another hit song in Opole, "Tato, kup mi dżinsy" ("Dad, Buy Me Some Jeans").

In 1966, Karin's first solo LP was released in the USA, consisting of her greatest hits, and the singer performed across North America with Czerwono-Czarni. In the same year, the band's self-titled debut album was released, followed by 17.000.000 in 1967, both with contributions from Stanek. In the meantime, Karin completed a part-time secondary school, which she was not able to attend earlier due to difficult financial situation of her family. Lack of education was the reason why Stanek had been repeatedly criticised up to that point, although some also had prejudice against her Silesian background and dialect.

Karin toured the Soviet Union with Czerwono-Czarni in 1968, but she left the band in the summer of 1969 due to strained relations between the band members. In the same year, she met Anna Kryszkiewicz, who would become her life-long manager and the closest friend. She briefly performed with a Czech band The Samuels, and started to compose her own songs. Although the new material was well-received by the public, the singer became an object of hostile attacks from Polish media. She made a comeback at Opole Festival in 1974 where she performed some of her biggest hits at a concert celebrating the 30th anniversary of the Polish People's Republic and premiered a new song "Dyskoteka rock". Although the audience received the songs very well, Stanek's performance was omitted from the TV broadcast by unsympathetic censors.

Polish media and music industry still deliberately tried to sabotage Karin's artistic career, what in 1975 prompted her to focus on performing abroad. She eventually emigrated to West Germany and in 1979, she released a German-language album Das geballte Temperament mit der unerhörten Stimme (The Clenched Temperament with an Unheard Voice) promoted by the single "Ich mag dich so wie du bist" ("I Like You the Way You Are") which she performed in a popular TV show Disco. In 1981, she released the single "Let's Have a Party" as Cory Gun. It was followed by three more English-language singles released with her band Blackbird between 1982 and 1984. Due to her manager's personal problems, the records couldn't receive effective promotion and passed unnoticed. Stanek relocated from Cologne to Wolfenbüttel, where her family lived, and applied for German citizenship. She decided to put her career on a hiatus although still collaborated with local bands.

In 1991, the singer was invited to perform in Sopot at a concert dedicated to Polish rock music. The performance, her first in Poland in fifteen years, was very well received by the audience and the press alike. Stanek then embarked on a concert tour in North America. In 1992, a Greatest Hits album was released and the artist performed in Sopot again to mark the 30th anniversary of her career. In 1993, Karin's biography was released, written by her manager, Anna. In the following years, she would regularly perform in Poland, although she never settled back in the country. A number of CD compilations of Stanek's music was released in Poland by various labels throughout the late 1990s and the 2000s.

In 2005, Stanek gave her last ever live show in Szczecin, Poland and released the final studio recording – a German eurodance song called "Sex". Her health condition declined in subsequent years and she eventually died in early 2011 from severe pneumonia. Later that year, a 3-CD compilation of her songs was released and in 2015, Stanek's former manager published an updated version of her biography.

== Discography ==
- 1966: Malowana lala – Najpopularniejsze przeboje śpiewa Karin Stanek
- 1979: Das geballte Temperament mit der unerhörten Stimme
- 1992: Greatest Hits
- 1999: Malowana lala
- 2002: Jedziemy autostopem – Złota kolekcja
- 2003: Platynowa kolekcja – Złote przeboje
- 2003: Jimmy Joe – Polskie perły
- 2006: Platynowa kolekcja – Moje złote przeboje
- 2009: Dziewczyna z gitarą
- 2011: Autostopem z malowaną lalą

== Filmography ==
- 1963: Gdzieś w Polsce
- 1964: Dwa żebra Adama
