= Alf Skowron =

Retired Canadian politician

Alf Skowron is a retired politician in Winnipeg, Manitoba, Canada. He was a member of the Winnipeg City Council from 1971 to 1989, originally a member of the New Democratic Party and later as an independent.

== Councillor ==
Skowron was first elected to the Winnipeg City Council in the 1971 municipal election, for the Talbot Ward in the St. Johns area. He was re-elected in 1974.

When Winnipeg's city council was restructured in 1977, Skowron ran in the new division of Elmwood and defeated fellow councillor Ray Brunka, whom he defeated again in 1980, 1983 and 1986. He lost his seat to Lillian Thomas in 1989. Skowron also campaigned for Mayor of Winnipeg in a 1979 by-election, but finished well behind frontrunners Bill Norrie and Joseph Zuken.

Skowron was on the right wing of the New Democratic Party. In 1979, he led council opposition to the introduction of bilingual English and French municipal signs. The signs were introduced to recognize the legal rights of Manitoba's francophone community; Skowron argued that they privileged one particular ethnic group. When he ran for mayor later in the same year, he sought but did not receive the provincial NDP's official endorsement. He accused the party of being infiltrated with communists, citing that Communist Joseph Zuken had emerged as the main left-of-centre candidate.

Skowron and fellow NDP councillor Bill Chornopyski broke with their party's position in September 1983, and voted for the City of Winnipeg to hold a plebiscite in response to the provincial government's decision to reintroduce official bilingualism. Both councillors left the NDP shortly after the 1983 election, and Skowron later affiliated with a centre-right group on council.

== Since 1989 ==
In 1993, Skowron played a role in having a recreation centre named after former councillor Magnus Eliason.

During the same year, Skowron became involved in a controversy involving his friend, councillor Al Golden. Golden had attempted to convince the group Habitat For Humanity to purchase a warehouse owned by Skowron, and used council letterhead in his correspondence. Golden helped to manage the building in question and applied for permits on Skowron's behalf, though he denied any direct ownership. Golden said that he had applied for the documents as a favour to Skowron, whom he indicated had "never taken out a permit in his life". A report into the matter concluded that Golden's behaviour was inappropriate, but did not violate any law.

Skowron was fined $1,000 in 1996, after being found guilty of failing to file his 1993 income-tax return. The judge justified the lenient fine on the grounds that Skowron had not sought to hide or evade taxes. Skowron said that he failed to file his return because a former business partner refused to make financial records available. His lawyer indicated that Skowron was from the "old school", and believed his return had to be complete before it could be submitted.
