= Dorota Skowron =

Polish astronomer

Dorota Maria Skowron is a scientist at the University of Warsaw. In 2019 she was part of the team that confirmed that the Milky Way galaxy was not flat. She is a member of the International Astronomical Union.
