= AOK (album) =

Studio album by Mandaryna
- Released: 8 August 2009
- Genres: Pop, dance
- Length: 38:56
- Label: Fonografika

Mandaryna chronology
Mandarynkowy sen (2005)	AOK (2009)

Singles from AOK
- 1. "Good Dog Bad Dog" Released: 2009

AOK is a studio album by Polish singer and dancer Mandaryna, released in 2009.

== Background ==
The main producer of AOK was Ali Alien. It is said that this person is in fact Michał Wiśniewski.

Musically, the album references electro-pop works of artists such as Lady Gaga. The album was expected to be a big comeback for the singer, after her 2005 Mandarynkowy sen album and legal problems in the following years, but turned out a commercial failure. AOK did not chart and only 5,000 copies were sold. The lead single, "Good Dog Bad Dog", met with considerable success, but the release of the second single, "High", was cancelled.

"Good Dog Bad Dog", an electropop song with elements of rap, was written and produced by Ali Alien and Marek Śledziewski, then remixed by Josh Harris, an American producer. The videoclip for the song was shot within 6 days in Poland. It premiered on 12 October 2009 on Polish division of VIVA. The song was performed on Polish breakfast TV show Dzień Dobry TVN. The song and the video met with positive response but received little airplay on Polish mainstream radio stations and television, apart from VIVA.

== Track listing ==
1. "No Work No Sweat" – 3:37
2. "Chemical" – 4:10
3. "High" – 3:57
4. "Good Dog Bad Dog" – 3:36
5. "Love Eclipse" – 3:18
6. "Lies" – 3:58
7. "Love & Lemonade" – 4:01
8. "First Time" – 4:05
9. "Lonely Ride" – 3:05
10. "AOK" – 5:02

== Release history ==
Country	Date
Poland	August 2009
Lithuania	September 2009
Germany	December 2009
