= Wojciech Skowroński =

Wojciech Skowroński (July 1941, in Warsaw – 17 January 2002, in Poznań) was a Polish singer and piano player.

He started his musical career in the 1950s and was a member of Czerwono-Czarni, Bardowie, Hubertusy, Drumlersi, Nowi Polanie, and Grupa ABC.
