= Ev'ry Night =

Single by Mandaryna

from the album Mandarynkowy sen
- Released: 2005
- Genre: Pop, dance
- Length: 3:07
- Label: Universal Music Group
- Songwriters: Herald Reitinger, Uli Fisher

Mandaryna singles chronology
"L'Été indien" (2004)	"Ev'ry Night" (2005)	"You Give Love a Bad Name" (2005)

"Ev'ry Night" is a 2005 single by the Polish singer and dancer Mandaryna.

== Background ==
"Ev'ry Night" was the first single released from Mandaryna's second album, Mandarynkowy sen. It's an uptempo dance track written and produced by Herald Reitinger and Uli Fisher. The song became Mandaryna's biggest hit. The accompanying music video was filmed in Croatia.

Mandaryna performed the song live at Sopot Festival where she came in second and caused a major media controversy after exposing her alleged lack of vocal talent.

== Track listing ==
- CD Single
1. "Ev'ry Night" – 3:08
- CD Maxi-Single
1. "Ev'ry Night"
2. "I Wanna Fly"
3. "Stay Forever"
4. "Twoje przeznaczenie"
5. "You Are My Music"
