= Singapore (song) =

Single by 2 Plus 1

from the album Easy Come, Easy Go
- Released: 1980
- Recorded: 1979
- Genre: Pop, disco
- Label: Philips
- Songwriters: Wolff-Ekkehardt Stein, Wolfgang Jass
- Producers: Michael Holm, Rainer Pietsch

2 Plus 1 singles chronology
"Easy Come, Easy Go" (1979)	"Singapore" (1980)	"Allah Inch' Allah" (1980)

"Singapore" is a single by Polish band 2 Plus 1, released in 1980 by Philips Records.

== Song information ==
"Singapore" (in Japanese: "夢のシンガポール", also known as "Singapore Dreams") was the second single from 2 Plus 1's first international album Easy Come, Easy Go, and the band's first single released in Japan.

The song was met with modest success in Japan and has become one of 2 Plus 1's most popular songs. It was later released as the B-side on their 1981 single "Mama Chita". In 1981, the music video for the song was filmed in Poland as part of a TV special Moje marzenia.

== Track listing ==
- 7" Single

A. "Singapore"
B. "Easy Come, Easy Go"

== Chart performance ==
Chart (1980)	Peak position
Japanese Singles Charts	7
