= Ryszard Poznakowski =

Polish musician (1946–2024)

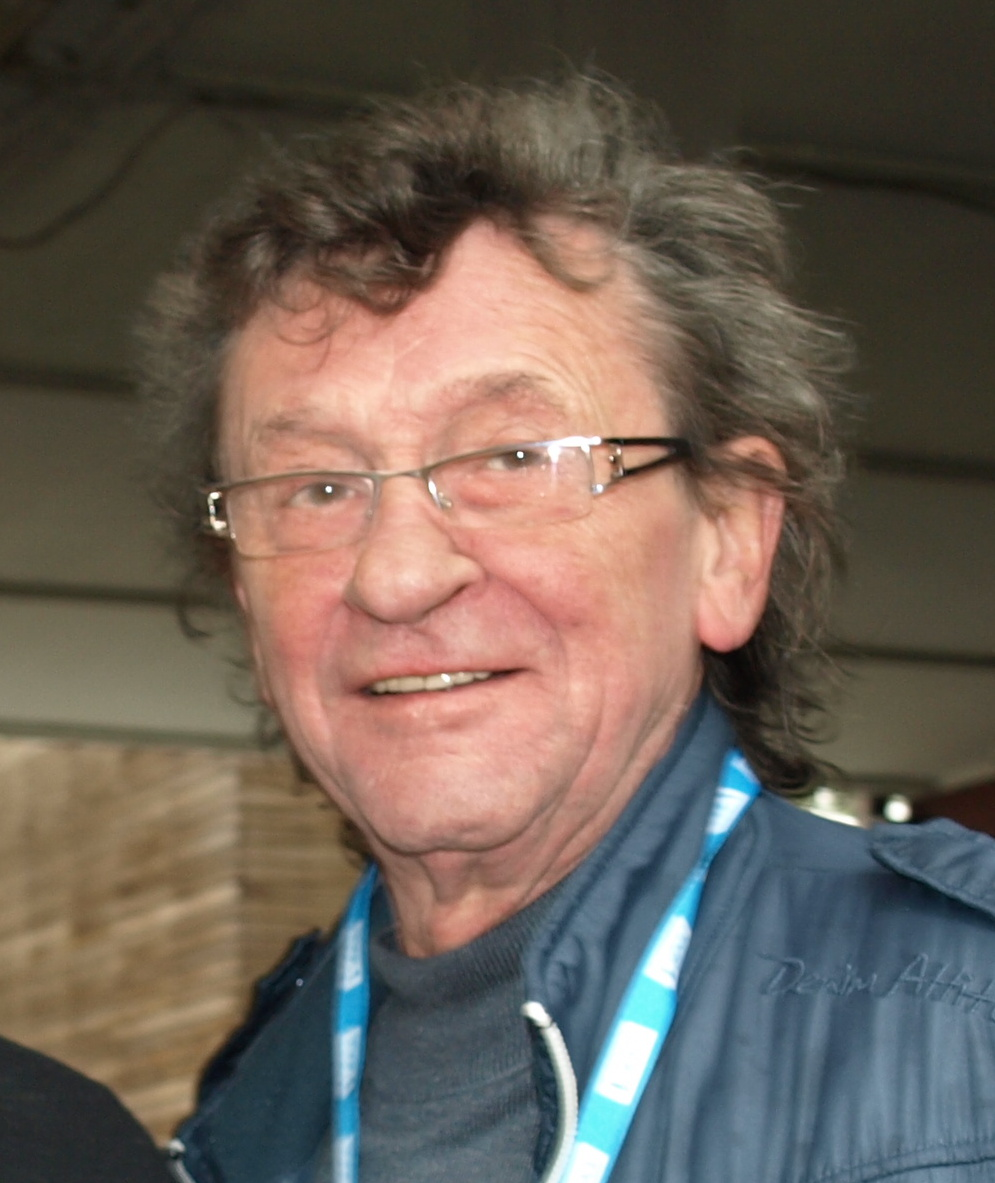
A picture of Ryszard Poznakowski taken in 2012

Ryszard Poznakowski (11 January 1946 – 30 November 2024) was a Polish musician, composer and arranger.

== Life and career ==
From 1969 to 1971 and 1973 to 2005, Poznakowski was a member of the band Trubadurzy, with whom he also performed occasionally from 2010 to 2023.

From 2012 to 2024, he was leader of the Poznakowski Band. He created songs (mainly lyrics) for artists such as Krzysztof Krawczyk, Jacek Lech, Czerwono-Czarni, Alicja Majewska, Bogdana Zagórska, Renata Danel, Zbigniew Wodecki, Krzysztof Cwynar, Andrzej Zaucha, Katarzyna Sobczyk, Andrzej Dąbrowski, Edward Hulewicz and Wojciech Gąssowski.

Poznakowski died on 30 November 2024, at the age of 78.
