= Warsaw Nights =

Studio album by 2 Plus 1
- Released: 1981
- Genre: Pop, disco
- Length: 38:38
- Label: Autobahn, Express
- Producer: Michael Holm, Rainer Pietsch

2 Plus 1 chronology
Easy Come, Easy Go (1980)	Warsaw Nights (1981)	Bez limitu (1983)

Warsaw Nights is the seventh studio album by Polish group 2 Plus 1, released in 1981. It was their second and last international album, released by Autobahn Records in Germany, and Express in Japan, where it sported a different cover. The LP was recorded with the same set of producers as on Easy Come, Easy Go. "Mama Chita" and "Lady Runaway" were released as singles. Neither Warsaw Nights nor 2 Plus 1's first international album were re-released on CD in their entirety.

== Track listing ==
Side A:

1. "Blue Lights of Pasadena" – 3:11
2. "Magic Island" – 3:29
3. "Hula Lula Nights" – 3:06
4. "Malibu" – 4:06
5. "Mama Chita" – 2:49
6. "Warsaw Nights" – 3:17

Side B:

1. "Joy for the World" – 3:18
2. "Man of Mystery" – 3:46
3. "Long Ways" – 3:06
4. "I'll See You Around" – 5:42
5. "Lady Runaway" – 3:28
