= 2 Plus 1 =

Polish band

- Also known as: Dwa Plus Jeden, 2+1, Gruppe 2+1, Two Plus One
- Origin: Warsaw, Poland
- Genres: Pop, folk, country, synth-pop, new wave, rock
- Years active: 1971–1992; 1998–1999
- Labels: Polskie Nagrania Muza, Tonpress, Wifon, Autobahn, Savitor, PolJazz, Sonic
- Past members: Classic line-up Janusz Kruk; Elżbieta Dmoch; Cezary Szlązak; Former members Andrzej Rybiński; Andrzej Krzysztofik

2 Plus 1 were a Polish band performing pop and folk music, and, in the later period of their activity, also synth-pop and rock. They were founded in 1971 by Janusz Kruk and Elżbieta Dmoch. The band recorded ten studio albums, three of which have been certified Gold in Poland, and established such evergreen hits as "Chodź, pomaluj mój świat", "Windą do nieba" and "Iść w stronę słońca". They have won a number of local and international awards, and performed in countries around the world, such as Germany, the Soviet Union, the United States, Canada and Cuba. 2 Plus 1 enjoyed their biggest popularity in the 1970s, but remained successful into the mid-1980s. In addition, the band achieved notable success in Western Europe and Japan with the songs "Easy Come, Easy Go" and "Singapore". The end of 2 Plus 1's activity was marked by the death of Janusz Kruk in 1992. A successful, but short lived reunion took place at the end of the 1990s. 2 Plus 1 remain one of the most successful bands in the history of Polish popular music, and their musical legacy still proves influential in Poland.

== History ==
=== 1971–1975: Formation and early success ===
The band was founded in Warsaw in January 1971 by guitarist Janusz Kruk and flautist Elżbieta Dmoch, who both had been part of a short lived band, Warszawskie Kuranty, in the 1960s. The two were joined by another guitarist, Andrzej Rybiński, and played their first live shows at the Hotel Bristol in Warsaw. The band worked with Polish lyricist Katarzyna Gärtner and became the first artist to perform her songs live. Initially called Smak Miodu (Polish for "Taste of Honey"), the trio would soon be renamed Dwa Plus Jeden (2 Plus 1). In the summer of 1971, the group performed their first concert to a mass audience at the National Festival of Polish Song in Opole, and received an award for the song "Nie zmogła go kula". Andrzej Rybiński very soon left the group to work on his own project, Andrzej i Eliza, and was replaced by Andrzej Krzysztofik. The band performed "Już nie będę taki głupi" at the festival in Kołobrzeg and recorded their first EP, which featured four folk-flavoured songs. The band started to perform abroad, including West Berlin and the Soviet Union.

1972 saw 2 Plus 1 achieve mainstream popularity with hits "Czerwone słoneczko" and "Chodź, pomaluj mój świat". The band performed at Sopot International Song Festival and in November recorded for RCA Italiana. In December 1972, their debut LP Nowy wspaniały świat was released by Polskie Nagrania Muza. In addition to two previously known hits, it included the songs "Wstawaj, szkoda dnia" and "Hej, dogonię lato" which also became popular. The album sold very well and was later certified Gold. 2 Plus 1 were proclaimed the band of the year by several media outlets, and their acoustic pop-folk music proved especially popular with teenagers. In March 1973, Janusz Kruk and Elżbieta Dmoch got married. The group then performed the song "Zjechaliśmy kapelą" on the German TV show Disco and were met with a warm reception. In June, 2 Plus 1 performed for the third time at the Opole Festival and received an award for the song "Codzienność". That same year, the band recorded the hit song "Gwiazda dnia" for the movie In Desert and Wilderness, based on Henryk Sienkiewicz's novel of the same name.

In the spring of 1974, 2 Plus 1 performed in the United States and Canada for the first time, followed by Scotland, France, Switzerland and West Germany. With the song "Kołysanka matki", they took 3rd place at the festival in Sopot. The group made an appearance on the all-star TV special Piosenki z autografem, performing "Na luzie", alongside such artists as Anna Jantar and Danuta Rinn. The British magazine Music Week proclaimed 2 Plus 1 the star of the year. The band continued performing frequently in 1975, with performances in East Germany, Czechoslovakia and the Soviet Union. Their second LP, Wyspa dzieci, was a concept album and turned out to be another success, including the previously known hits "Gwiazda dnia", "Kołysanka matki" and "Na luzie" as well as the popular title song.

=== 1976–1979: Artistic development ===
The group scored another hit with the song "Odpłyniesz wielkim autem", which they recorded in English and released as a single in Germany. Their next project was a suite in honor of Zbigniew Cybulski, a famous Polish actor who had died in the late 1960s. The musical spectacle, showcasing a more sophisticated sound than the group's previous efforts, premiered in Opole in 1976 and received significant praise. Andrzej Krzysztofik left the group and was replaced by Cezary Szlązak, forming what would turn out to be the band's most successful line-up. In early 1977, on the 10th anniversary of Cybulski's death, the band started to work on their third studio album, Aktor, based around the previously known musical spectacle. 2 Plus 1 toured with that repertoire not only in Poland, but also in East Germany and Czechoslovakia, where the album was released as Herec. In the same year, 2 Plus 1 released another single in West Germany, which featured the songs "Ring Me Up" and "Free Me".

In 1978, the band recorded Teatr na drodze, an album embracing their pre-Aktor accessible pop-folk style. It is this album that features one of 2 Plus 1's biggest hits, "Windą do nieba", which went on to become an evergreen. Other notable songs on the LP included "Ding-Dong", "Romanse za grosz" and "Ballada łomżyńska", the latter with a contribution from the legendary Polish musician Czesław Niemen. In the summer, 2 Plus 1 went to Cuba, where they performed "La Habana mi amor" and taped a TV special. At the Sopot Festival, the band won an award for "Windą do nieba" and "Ding-dong". That same year, they released a new single "Taksówka nr 5", which was another success. In March 1979, 2 Plus 1 visited Cuba again, where they successfully toured for two weeks. Their double A-side single, featuring the songs "Margarita" and "La Habana mi amor", was the first record by a Polish artist ever released in Cuba. Meanwhile, in Poland, 2 Plus 1 released their fifth studio album, Irlandzki tancerz. The LP was inspired by Irish folk music and contained Polish translations of thirteen old Irish ballads. The album received highly favourable reviews and was another major seller in 2 Plus 1's career. A promotional musical film of the same name was shown on television in May 1979.

=== 1979–1981: International career ===
In the summer of 1979, 2 Plus 1 recorded their third single for the German market, the disco-pop song "Easy Come, Easy Go". The band performed it on the popular West German TV show Musikladen, and the East German variety show Ein Kessel Buntes. The song was a surprise success, charting within the German Top 40. The follow-up album Easy Come, Easy Go, recorded entirely in English with German and American musicians, was released in early 1980. It was met with modest success and would eventually receive Gold certification in Poland. It spawned another hit, "Singapore", which reached number 7 in Japan. In the same year, 2 Plus 1 were headlining the Sopot Festival, where they performed their English-language material.

In 1981, the band released a non-album song "Iść w stronę słońca", which went on to become one of their biggest hits in Poland. Their second international album, Warsaw Nights, was released in the same year, promoted by the singles "Mama Chita" and "Lady Runaway". The band performed in Villach, Austria and spent several months touring in the USA. However, the growing popularity of 2 Plus 1 in Western Europe was suddenly interrupted by the imposition of martial law in Poland in December 1981. As this had complicated travelling abroad, the group decided to refocus on the Polish market. Their last international offering was the song "Rocky Doctor", released two years later.

=== 1982–1987: New musical direction ===
In 1982, 2 Plus 1 released a new wave-inspired double A-side single, with the songs "Kalkuta nocą" and "Obłędu chcę", which enjoyed considerable popularity. In 1983, the band gave a critically acclaimed avant-garde performance at the Opole Festival, where they premiered songs from their forthcoming album. Their eighth studio LP, Bez limitu, introduced the band's new image and musical style, which now explored new wave, rock and synthpop. The album spawned the hits "Nic nie boli", "Requiem dla samej siebie", "Superszczur" and "XXI wiek (Dla wszystkich nas)", and was certified Gold the following year. 2 Plus 1 were in fact one of the very few artists from the 1970s who remained commercially successful in the 1980s.

In February 1984, 2 Plus 1 performed at the Warsaw Congress Hall, which was broadcast on television. Their next single, the uptempo synthpop track "Wielki mały człowiek", became one of their biggest hits. The group teamed up with Maciej Zembaty and John Porter to work on their ninth album, Video. Released in 1985, it was largely drawing from synthpop and New Romanticism, and turned out to be another success. The LP spawned further hits "Video" and the Polish-English "Chińskie latawce", the latter a duet between Elżbieta Dmoch and John Porter. A TV special was filmed to promote the album. In 1985, Cezary Szlązak released a solo single, featuring songs "Bezpłatny kurs" and "Inne życie, inny świat".

After the release of Video, 2 Plus 1 significantly limited their live appearances and media exposure. 1986 saw the release of the retrospective Greatest Hits Live. In 1987, Janusz Kruk started to compose music for theatrical plays, including Szaleństwa pana Hilarego, based on Julian Tuwim's short story. The band recorded one new song, "Ocalić coś", later released on the various artists compilation Całuj gorąco. Janusz and Elżbieta broke up in the second half of the 1980s, after Janusz left her for another woman. The couple divorced in 1989, but remained friends.

=== 1988–2008: The break-up and aftermath ===
In 1988, 2 Plus 1 started working on a new album and performed several new songs on the TV show Premie i premiery. In 1989, their tenth and final studio album Antidotum was released. The record wasn't as successful as previous albums, but several tracks gained moderate popularity, most notably "Ocalę Cię". The band then embarked on a tour of the USA. During one of their concerts, Janusz Kruk, who had already been struggling with heart problems, fainted on stage. This prompted the group to take some time off from extensive touring, and Janusz focused on composing soundtracks for plays. In 1991, the hits collection 18 Greatest Hits became their first album released directly on CD.

In June 1992, Janusz Kruk died of a heart attack. Elżbieta, who never got over the loss, moved from Warsaw to the countryside, and subsequently gave up public and artistic life. In 1997, another compilation Greatest Hits Vol. 2 was released, which focused on rare and previously unreleased tracks. In the fall of 1998, Cezary and Elżbieta decided to reactivate 2 Plus 1, recruiting two new musicians. Their first performances were met with enthusiastic response, and the band embarked on a successful tour. They appeared on several TV shows, including Szansa na sukces. However, in early 1999, Elżbieta suddenly decided to withdraw from all future plans and 2 Plus 1 ultimately disbanded. Cezary Szlązak founded his own group, Cezary Szlązak Band.

At the end of the 1990s, and after 2000, numerous 2 Plus 1 compilations appeared on the market, released by various record companies. In 2002, Elżbieta made a guest appearance at a community centre in Łomża, where a teenage group staged a play as a tribute to 2 Plus 1 and their music. In January 2005, a Polish TV program Uwaga! reported on her apparently poor living conditions, which caused a massive sympathetic response. In August 2008, Elżbieta attended a secret 2 Plus 1 fans gathering in Warsaw.

== Band members ==
- Janusz Kruk (vocal, guitar) 1971-1992
- Elżbieta Dmoch (vocal, flute) 1971-1999
- Andrzej Rybiński (guitar, backing vocal) 1971
- Andrzej Krzysztofik (bass guitar, harmonica, backing vocal) 1971-1976
- Cezary Szlązak (saxophone, clarinet, backing vocal) 1976-1999
- Michał Król (guitar) 1998-1999
- Dariusz Sygitowicz (drum kit) 1998-1999
- Wacław Laskowski (drum kit)) 1976-1986

In the mid-1970s, two additional musicians supported the band: Adam Pilawa (piano, violin) and Andrzej Wójcik (drum kit).

== Discography ==
- 1972: Nowy wspaniały świat
- 1975: Wyspa dzieci
- 1977: Aktor
- 1978: Teatr na drodze
- 1979: Irlandzki tancerz
- 1980: Easy Come, Easy Go
- 1981: Warsaw Nights
- 1983: Bez limitu
- 1985: Video
- 1986: Greatest Hits Live
- 1989: Antidotum
- 1991: 18 Greatest Hits

== Most notable songs ==
- 1972: "Czerwone słoneczko"
- 1972: "Chodź, pomaluj mój świat"
- 1973: "Wstawaj, szkoda dnia"
- 1973: "Hej, dogonię lato"
- 1973: "Gwiazda dnia"
- 1974: "Kołysanka matki"
- 1974: "Na luzie"
- 1978: "Windą do nieba"
- 1978: "Ding-dong"
- 1979: "Easy Come, Easy Go"
- 1980: "Singapore"
- 1981: "Iść w stronę słońca"
- 1982: "Kalkuta nocą"
- 1982: "Nic nie boli"
- 1983: "Requiem dla samej siebie"
- 1983: "XXI wiek (Dla wszystkich nas)"
- 1983: "Superszczur"
- 1984: "Wielki mały człowiek"
