= Easy Come, Easy Go (2 Plus 1 song) =

Single by 2 Plus 1

from the album Easy Come, Easy Go
- Released: 1979
- Recorded: 1979
- Genre: Pop, disco
- Length: 3:18
- Label: Autobahn
- Songwriters: Wolff-Ekkehardt Stein, Wolfgang Jass
- Producers: Michael Holm, Rainer Pietsch

2 Plus 1 singles chronology
"Taksówka nr 5" (1979)	"Easy Come, Easy Go" (1979)	"Singapore" (1980)

"Easy Come, Easy Go" is a song by Polish band 2 Plus 1, released in 1979 by Autobahn Records.

== Song information ==
The song was 2 Plus 1's fourth single in Germany, and their fifth international release. It was recorded throughout the summer in 1979, and released later that year. Written, arranged and produced by German musicians, "Easy Come, Easy Go" differed significantly from the band's earlier pop-folk material. The song was performed in a number of German television shows, including Musikladen. It met with considerable success, charting within the top 40 in Germany, and has become one of 2 Plus 1's greatest hits. "Calico Girl" was released as the single B-side, and both songs were later included on the group's first international LP, Easy Come, Easy Go.

== Track listing ==
- 7" Single

A. "Easy Come, Easy Go" – 3:18
B. "Calico Girl" – 3:24

== Chart performance ==
Chart (1979)	Peak position
German Singles Charts	40
