= Mandaryna =

Polish singer, dancer and actress (born 1978)

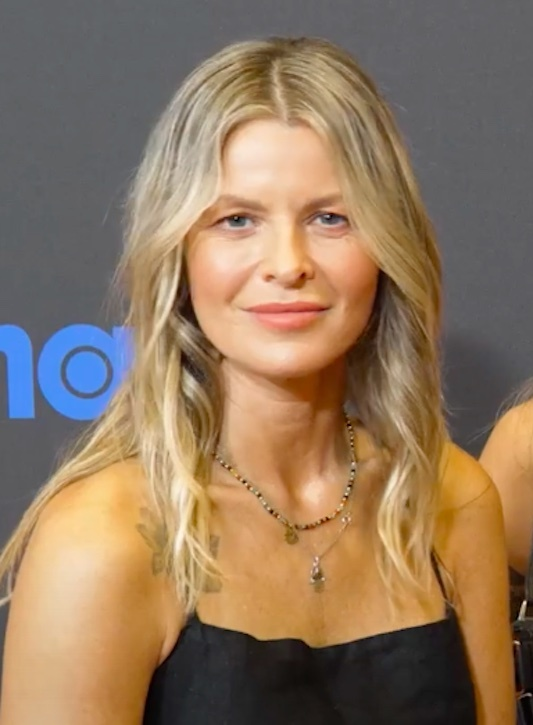
- Mandaryna in 2024
- Born: Marta Mandrykiewicz; 12 March 1978 (age 48); Łódź, Poland
- Occupations: Singer, dancer, choreographer, actress
- Spouse: Michał Wiśniewski (2002-2006 divorced)
- Children: 2 (1 daughter, 1 son)
- Musical career
- Also known as: Mandaryna
- Genres: Pop, dance
- Years active: 2003–2013, 2018–present
- Labels: Universal Music Poland, Magic, Fonografika

Marta Katarzyna Wiktoria Wiśniewska (born Marta Mandrykiewicz on 12 March 1978 in Łódź, Poland), professionally known as Mandaryna, is a Polish singer, dancer and actress. She rose to fame as the dancer of Polish pop group Ich Troje, and the partner of its leader, Michał Wiśniewski. She embarked on a singing career in 2004, covering Whitesnake's "Here I Go Again", which became a hit in Poland. Her first two albums, Mandaryna.com and Mandarynkowy sen, released in 2004 and 2005, respectively, were met with commercial success. In 2005, Mandaryna sparked a major controversy during her performance at Sopot Festival, which exposed her alleged lack of vocal talent. Nonetheless, the performed song "Ev'ry Night" became a massive hit and remains arguably her best-known song to date.

== Career ==
Throughout her teenage years, Marta Wiśniewska took extensive dancing lessons and was part of several dancing groups. In 2000, she became the dancer and choreographer of Ich Troje, then highly popular Polish pop group. She would become the partner of its lead singer, Michał Wiśniewski, and the couple took part in controversial reality show Jestem, jaki jestem, which became a television hit. During the show in 2003 she recorded two songs for Michał and began to prepare her musical career with professionals. She chose the artistic nickname "Mandaryna" deriving from her birth name.

In 2004, Mandaryna debuted as a singer and had a hit with the song "Here I Go Again", a cover version of a Whitesnake song, produced by Groove Coverage. Later in the summer, her debut album Mandaryna.com was released, going on to sell well and achieving gold certification in Poland. It was then released in Germany and Austria. In 2005, Mandaryna took part in Sopot Festival, performing live her new song "Ev'ry Night". The performance, which proved her lacking singing abilities, caused nationwide controversy and Mandaryna became the object of a backlash. Nonetheless, "Ev'ry Night" became a massive hit in Poland and the follow-up second album, Mandarynkowy sen, reached number 1 spot in the albums chart in Poland. The album also featured a cover of Bon Jovi's "You Give Love a Bad Name", which was released as the next single to considerable success.

In 2006, Mandaryna released the single "Stay Together" and started recording her third studio album. She also filmed her own short-lived, yet successful TV show Let's Dance, czyli zrobię dla was wszystko. In 2007, she recorded a new song, "Heaven", which again caused a stir, after it was proclaimed a rip-off of Madonna's "Jump". In the same year, she opened her first Mandaryna Dance Studio, which has since evolved into a chain of successful dance schools, and regularly appeared on Rozmowy w toku, a popular talk show. The release of her third studio album, Third Time: Mandaryna4You, was scheduled to January 2008, but due to a serious conflict between Mandaryna, her manager Katarzyna Kanclerz and music producer Marek Sośnicki, its release was pulled and it now remains unreleased. She founded a short-lived band, 2be3, and recorded a cover of New Kids on the Block's "Step by Step" with them. In 2009, she made a comeback with the album AOK. Although the album failed to chart, its only single "Good Dog Bad Dog", an electropop song with elements of rap, earned considerable popularity.

"Good Dog Bad Dog" was written and produced by Ali Alien and Marek Śledziewski, then remixed by Josh Harris, an American producer. The videoclip for the song was shot within six days in Poland. It premiered on 12 October 2009 on Polish division of VIVA. The song was performed on Polish breakfast TV show Dzień Dobry TVN. The song and the video met with positive response but received little airplay on Polish mainstream radio stations and television, apart from VIVA.

In 2010, she appeared as a member of the judging panel on popular TV show Hot or Not on VIVA Poland. She also announced working on her next studio album, due in early 2011 and initially called Sugar Sugar. The album was not released, but in 2012 Mandaryna came back with a new single, "Bring the Beat". In 2013, Marta Wiśniewska announced she has ended her musical career and instead was going to focus on developing her dance school business.

In 2018 she announced her musical comeback with performances in some clubs in Poland.

== Private life ==
Mandaryna was married to Michał Wiśniewski, the lead singer of the Polish pop group Ich Troje. She has two children with Wiśniewski, Xavier Michał (born 24 June 2002) and Fabienne Marta (born 21 August 2003), both born in Warsaw. She has been in a long-term relationship with Wojtek Bąkiewicz, a Polish photographer for Playboy and CKM magazines. She's a diabetic.

== Discography ==
=== Albums ===
List of studio albums, with selected chart positions, and certifications
| Title | Album details | Peak chart positions | Certifications |
| Title | Album details | PL | Certifications |
|---|---|---|---|
| Mandaryna.com | Released: August 2004; Label: Magic; Formats: CD, digital download | 8 | PL: Gold |
| Mandarynkowy sen | Released: August 2005; Label: Universal; Formats: CD, digital download | 1 | |
| AOK | Released: 8 August 2009; Label: Fonografika; Formats: CD | — | |

=== Singles ===
List of singles as lead artist, with album name
| Title | Year | Album |
|---|---|---|
| "Here I Go Again" | 2004 | Mandaryna.com |
| "L'Été indien" | 2004 | Mandaryna.com |
| "Ev'ry Night" | 2005 | Mandarynkowy sen |
| "You Give Love a Bad Name" | 2005 | Mandarynkowy sen |
| "A Spaceman Came Travelling" | 2005 | Mandarynkowy sen |
| "Stay Together" | 2006 | Non-album singles |
| "Heaven" | 2007 | Non-album singles |
| "Good Dog Bad Dog" | 2009 | AOK |
| "Bring the Beat" | 2012 | Non-album singles |
| "Not Perfect" | 2018 | Non-album singles |

== Acting ==
- 1999: Cisza – film
- 2002: Gwiazdor – film
- 2003-2004: Na Wspólnej – soap opera
- 2006-2007: Pierwsza miłość – soap opera
- 2007: Kryminalni – crime drama
