= Elżbieta Dmoch =

Polish singer and flautist

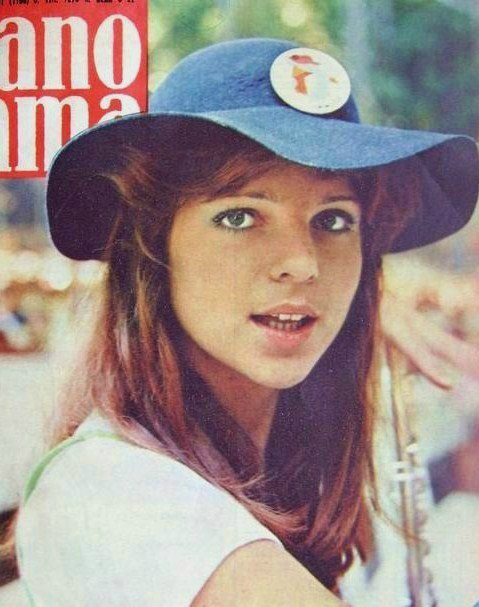
- ca. 1975

Background information
- Born: September 29, 1951 (age 75); Warsaw, Poland
- Genres: Pop, folk, country, synthpop, new wave, rock
- Occupations: singer, flautist
- Instruments: flute, piano
- Years active: 1968–1992, 1998–2002
- Formerly of: 2 Plus 1

Elżbieta Dmoch (born September 29, 1951) is a Polish singer and flautist, former member of the popular band 2 Plus 1.

== Career ==
Dmoch started to attend singing lessons in her earliest years. She went to a musical school, where she learned to play flute and piano.

At the end of the 1960s, she became a member of Warszawskie Kuranty, a band founded by Janusz Kruk. In January 1971, Janusz and Elżbieta formed a new group, 2 Plus 1, which went on to enjoy a mainstream popularity in Poland in the 1970s and the first half of the 1980s. In 1974, at the Sopot Festival, Dmoch won a trophy for the "most attractive singer". She received the same title two years later at the Opole Festival. In 1979, Polish Council of State awarded her with the Cross of Merit.

Dmoch composed the song "Naga plaża" for the 2 Plus 1 album Video, released in 1985.

== Private life ==
Dmoch was in a relationship with the 2 Plus 1 co-founder Janusz Kruk for almost twenty years. They married in February 1973 and divorced in the late 1980s, after Janusz had left her for another woman. His death in 1992 deeply affected Elżbieta, who subsequently retired from any artistic and public activity, with the exception of a brief 2 Plus 1 reunion in the late 1990s. Her very last public performance took place in Łomża, Poland in 2002. She currently lives a secluded lifestyle in Warsaw, though she attended two secret fan gatherings in 2008 and 2013.
