= Cardboard record =

Phonograph record made of paperboard

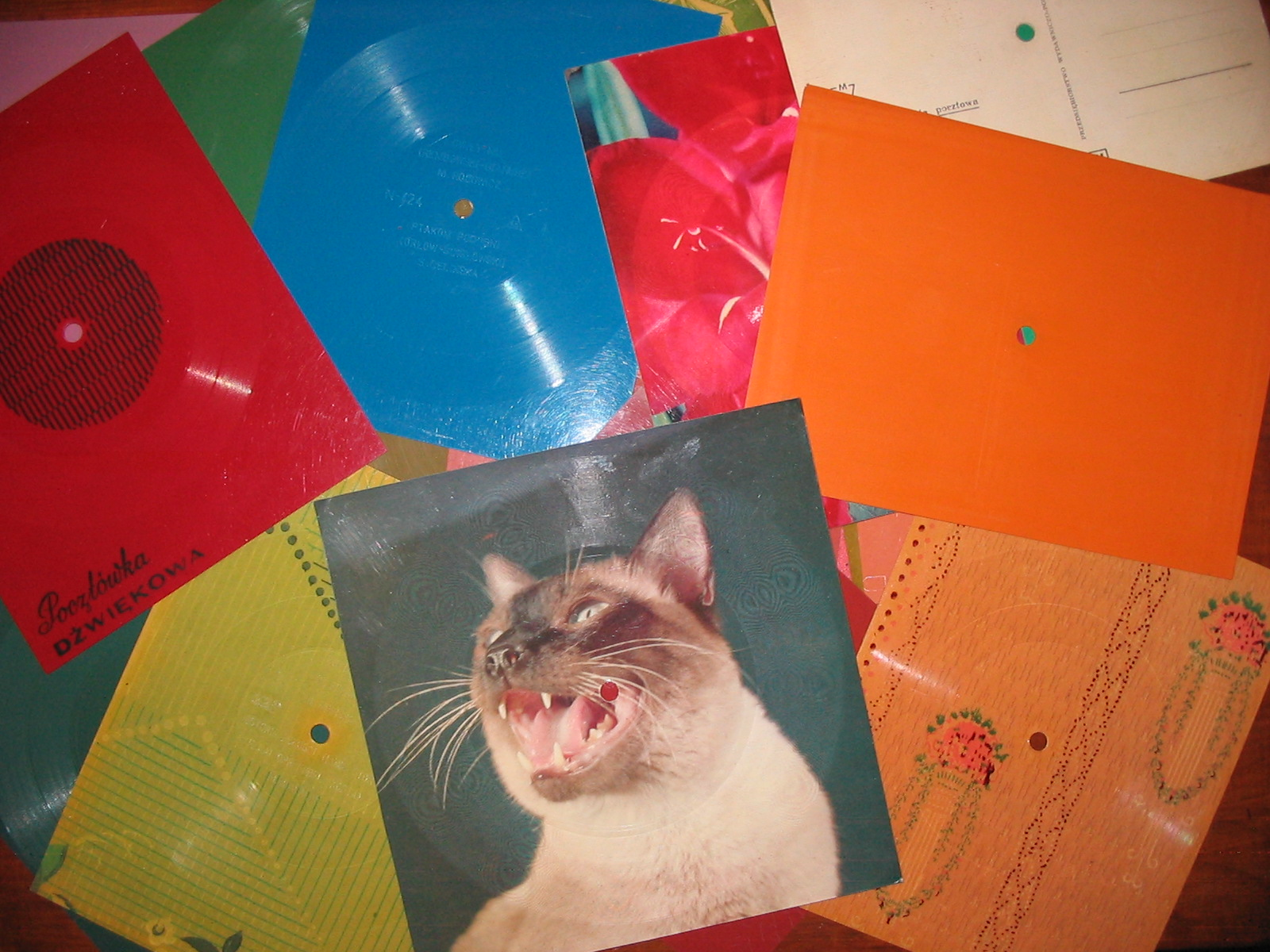
Polish cardboard records

A cardboard record, commonly referred to as a sound postcard (Polish: pocztówka dźwiękowa) in Poland, is a type of cheaply made phonograph record made of plastic-coated thin paperboard that was popular between the 1960s and 1970s, especially in Poland. These discs were usually small, had poor audio quality compared to vinyl or acetate discs, and were often only marginally playable due to their light weight, slick surface, and tendency to warp like a taco shell. Playability could be improved by placing a coin between the lock groove and the spindle hole to add weight and stability. These records are distinct from both flexi discs, which are sturdier, and from many of the old home-recording discs since cardboard discs were mass-produced for a specific purpose.

Cardboard records were often used as freebies in promotional campaigns, and as such were expected to be played once or twice and then thrown away. Two examples, both from the late 1980s, were Life Cereal's "Rock Music Mystery" and McDonald's' "Menu Song" contest, both of which were designed around audio "clues". Because of their disposable, limited-run nature, as well as their association with long-gone advertising campaigns, cardboard records can be quite collectible.

Cardboard records are also associated with phonographic recordings included with magazines of similar subject matter.

Certain songs credited to the fictional 1960s–1970s band the Archies were released as cardboard records printed directly on boxes of breakfast cereal. Other artists—usually with a generally younger fan base—such as the Monkees, the Jackson 5 and Bobby Sherman also had records released on the backs of cereal boxes during this time. Also there were some printed on cereal boxes, for instance, "All I Have to Do Is Dream" by the Everly Brothers. These records, if found in pristine condition, have significant value among collectors as well.

In the past, Mad Magazine inserted cardboard records of songs from its series of merchandised novelty albums in certain of their Mad Super Special reprint magazines. One of these, for example—the mid-60s release "It's a Gas!"—featured a rhythmic belching sound (allegedly provided by the magazine's fictional mascot, Alfred E. Neuman) with a honking saxophone break played by an uncredited King Curtis.
