= Easy Come, Easy Go (2 Plus 1 album) =

Studio album by 2 Plus 1
- Released: 1980
- Recorded: 1979–1980
- Genre: Pop, disco
- Length: 38:35
- Label: Autobahn, Wifon
- Producer: Michael Holm, Rainer Pietsch

2 Plus 1 chronology
Irlandzki tancerz (1979)	Easy Come, Easy Go (1980)	Warsaw Nights (1981)

Easy Come, Easy Go is the sixth studio album by Polish group 2 Plus 1, released in 1980. It was their first international LP, released by Autobahn Records in Germany and Wifon in Poland. Recorded with various outside musicians and producers, the album's blend of pop and disco was a departure from the band's previous folk-flavoured repertoire. The title track became 2 Plus 1's biggest hit in Germany and "Singapore" was popular in Japan. The album turned out a commercial success and was later certified Gold in Poland. Neither Easy Come, Easy Go nor 2 Plus 1's second international album were re-released on CD in their entirety.

== Track listing ==
Side A:

1. "Easy Come, Easy Go" – 3:17
2. "More" – 3:22
3. "Sad Is the Heart" – 3:40
4. "Keep Your Hands to Yourself" – 2:41
5. "You Won't See Me Crying" – 3:27
6. "Calico Girl" – 3:24

Side B:

1. "Jumbo Jumbo" – 3:18
2. "Allah Inch' Allah" – 3:47
3. "My Gipsy Lady" – 4:10
4. "Singapore" – 3:54
5. "Silver Arrows" – 3:35
