= Polskie Nagrania Muza =

Major Polish record label

Coordinates: 52.1628°N 21.0345°E

Polskie Nagrania „Muza”
- Parent company: Warner Music Group
- Founded: 1956
- Genre: jazz, rock, easy-listening, classical music
- Country of origin: Poland
- Location: Warsaw
- Official website: www.polskienagrania.com.pl

Polskie Nagrania "Muza" ("Polish Records 'Muse' ", official name since 2005: "Polskie Nagrania Sp. z o.o", i.e., Polskie Nagrania Ltd.) is a Polish record label based in Warsaw. It has produced records in many genres including pop, rock, jazz, folklore, classical, children. Until its purchase by Warner Music Poland in 2015, for €1.9 million, the label was owned by the Polish government.

The label was established in 1956 after the merger of the vinyl record factory Muza and the record house Polskie Nagrania (with the history of the latter traced to the Interbellum times). It also produced musical literature. In addition to its own vinyl record factory, it also used the factories of Pronit and Veriton.

== Roster ==
- ABBA (single release "Honey Honey"/"My Mama Said" (1974)
- Anna German
- Bajm
- Budka Suflera
- Czerwone Gitary
- Czerwono-Czarni (disbanded)
- Deuter
- Dżem
- Grzegorz Markowski
- Homo Homini
- Kombi (disbanded)
- Marek Grechuta
- Maryla Rodowicz
- Niebiesko-Czarni
- Stanisław Sojka
- SBB
- Seweryn Krajewski
- Stan Borys
- Tadeusz Nalepa
- Czesław Niemen (aka, Czesław Wydrzycki)
- Urszula Kasprzak
- Wojciech Skowroński
