= Janusz Kruk =

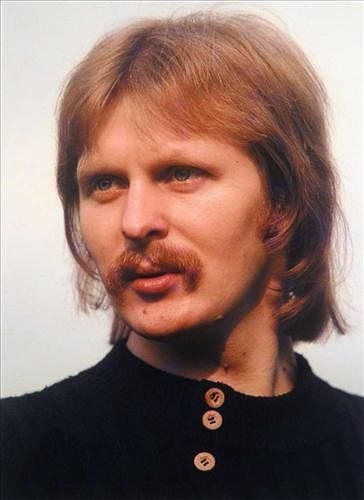

Background information
- Born: 7 August 1946; Warsaw, Poland
- Died: 18 June 1992 (aged 45) Warsaw, Poland
- Genres: Pop, folk, country, synthpop, new wave, rock
- Occupations: singer, guitarist, composer
- Instruments: Guitar, double bass
- Years active: 1968–1992

Janusz Kruk (7 August 1946 – 18 June 1992) was a Polish singer, guitarist and composer, the leader of the popular band 2 Plus 1.

== Career ==
Kruk graduated from a music secondary/high school in Warsaw, specializing in double bass. At the end of the 1960s, he founded the band Warszawskie Kuranty, a member of which was also Elżbieta Dmoch. In January 1971, Janusz and Elżbieta formed a new group, 2 Plus 1, which would become highly successful in Poland in the 1970s and the first half of the 1980s. The band also scored a number of minor hits in Western Europe and Japan, and released two albums internationally.

Kruk was the leader of 2 Plus 1 until his premature death in 1992. He composed most of the songs and holds arrangement and production credits for most of the albums, except for the two English-language LPs, Easy Come, Easy Go and Warsaw Nights. In the mid-late 1980s Kruk started composing musical scores for various theatre plays.

== Private life ==
Kruk married three times. For over fifteen years his wife was Elżbieta Dmoch, the co-founder of 2 Plus 1. The couple married in February 1973 and divorced in the late 1980s, after Janusz had left her for another woman.

Janusz Kruk died from a heart attack on 18 June 1992, aged 45, leaving behind his partner and two children. Prior to this, he had been struggling with cardiac problems. His death turned out to be a deep shock for Elżbieta, who has since become reclusive.
