= Floh de Cologne =

German krautrock band

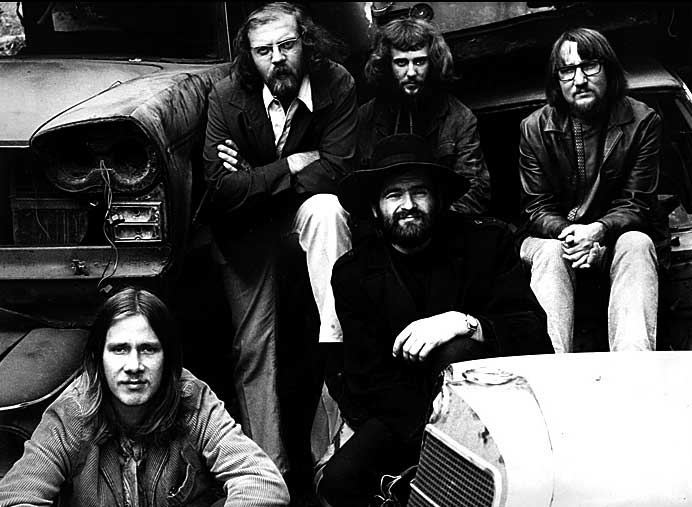
- Floh de Cologne in 1969: from left: Gerd Wollschon, Hansi Frank, Markus Schmid, Dick Städtler, Dieter Klemm

Background information
- Origin: Cologne, Germany
- Genres: Krautrock, progressive rock
- Years active: 1966–1983
- Label: Ohr
- Website: flohdecologne.de

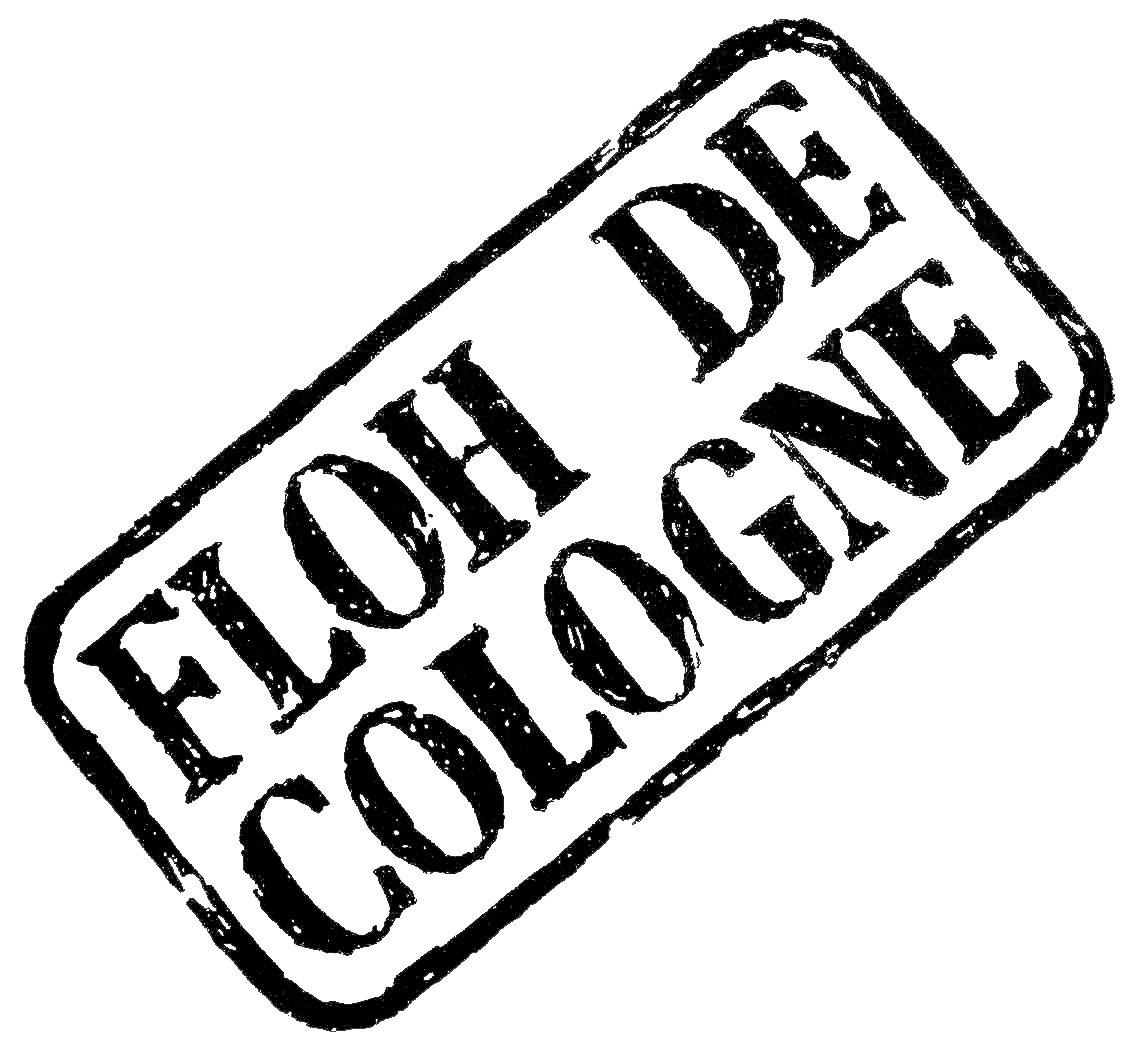
Floh de cologne signet by Wolfgang Niedecken

Floh de Cologne (a wordplay on Eau de Cologne and floh meaning 'flea') was a German band, active from 1966 to 1983, regarded as a pioneer of krautrock and musical political satire. After some success at the beginning of the 1970s, the band separated finally in 1983.

== Founding members ==
- Gerd Wollschon (lyrics, vocals, keyboards) until 1976, died September 9, 2012
- Markus Schmid (lyrics, bass guitar, guitar, vocals, keyboards, composition) until 1974
- Britta Baltruschat (vocals) until 1968
  Short-term founding members in the initial phase:

Jürgen Alef (management)
Udo Weinberger (vocals, spoken word)

== Other members ==
- Hans-Jörg "Hansi" Frank (drums, keyboards, vocals) since 1966
- Dieter Klemm (percussion, speaker, management) since 1967
- Dick Städtler (bass guitar, guitar, vocals, composition) since 1969
- Theo König (saxophone, clarinet, harmonica, vocals) since 1972, died July 20, 2017
- Vridolin Enxing (keyboards, bass guitar, guitar, cello, vocals, composition) since 1973

== History ==
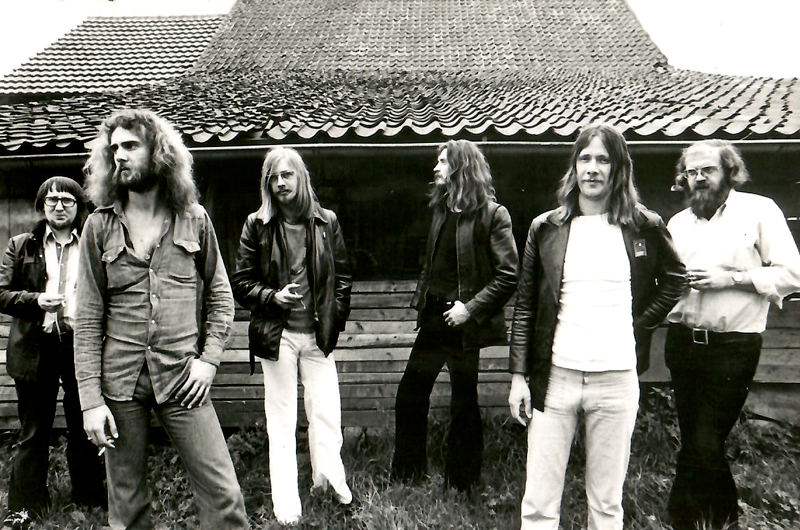
Floh de Cologne c. 1975: from left: Dieter Klemm, Dick Städtler, Vridolin Enxing, Theo König, Gerd Wollschon, Hansi Frank

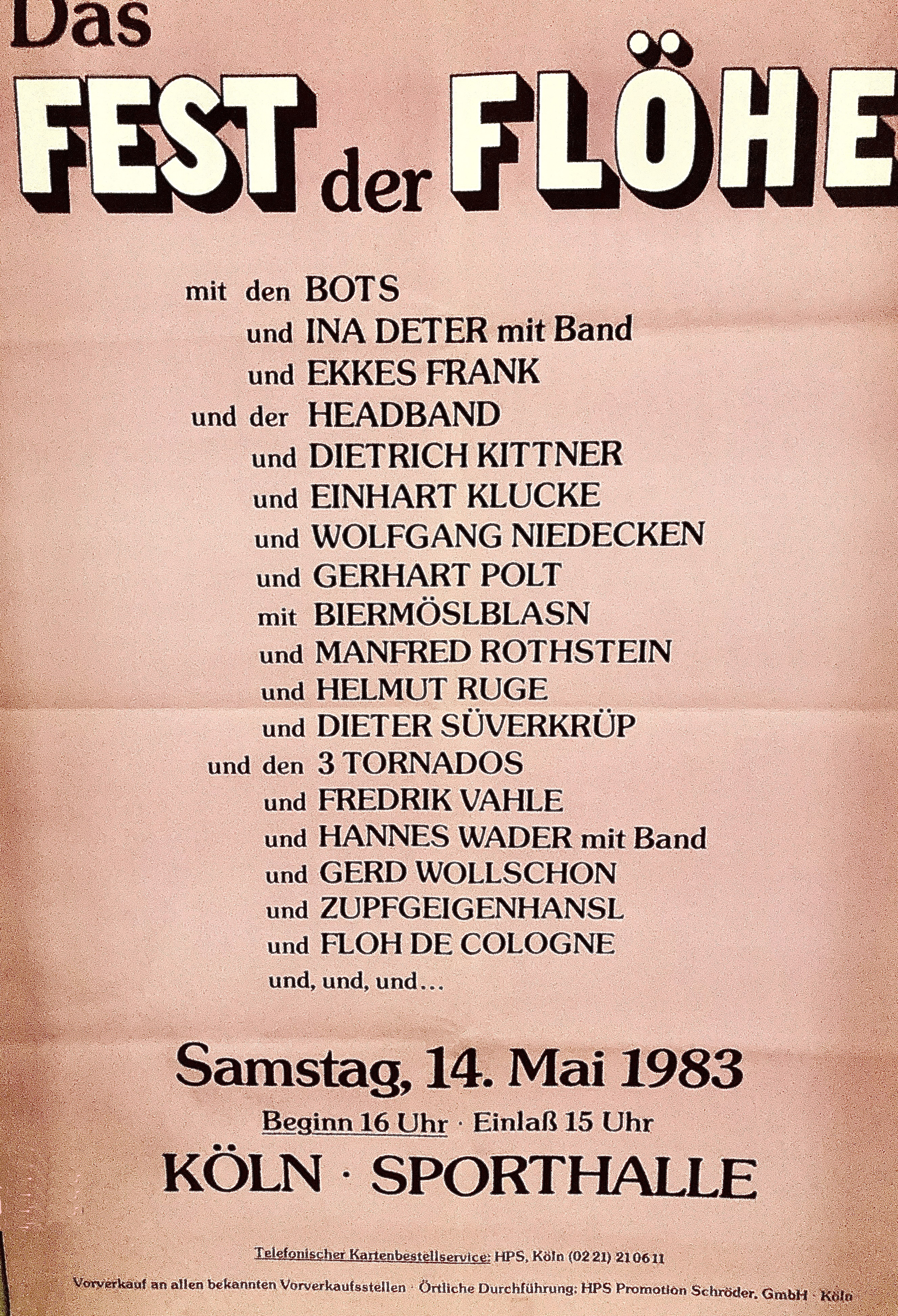
Poster for the Floh de Cologne farewell concert in 1983

The group was formed in 1966 by a group of radical theatre students from the University of Cologne. The band originated from the Cologne APO (extra-parliamentary opposition) around the SDS (Socialist German Student Union), and their political orientation shifted over the years towards a dialectical-Marxist position.

Independently of one another, the band members joined the DKP (German Communist Party) between 1970 and 1973. Their first album, Vietnam, released in 1968, is a fierce criticism of the war in Vietnam. The profits from this album were donated to a Vietnamese charity. They satirised consumer society and sought to take their message to young workers and apprentices. Impressed by their music and especially their lyrics, Rolf-Ulrich Kaiser decided to produce their next two albums: Rockoper Profitgeier (1971) and Lucky Streik (1972).

On 6 September 1970, the group performed at the Fehmarn Festival, following Jimi Hendrix. In 1973, Floh de Cologne performed as part of a West German delegation at the 10th World Festival of Youth and Students in East Berlin. After Gerd Wollschon's departure in 1976, the group increasingly collaborated with the lyricist Peter Maiwald, who contributed important songs for their stage shows and LPs. From 1980 onward, members of the band (Vridolin Enxing as chairman) were active in Rock gegen Rechts; in the same year, the group received the German Cabaret Prize with Gerhard Polt.

After more than 3,000 concerts in Germany and Europe, Floh de Cologne disbanded in May 1983 following a farewell tour. The farewell concert at the Cologne Sports Hall had 6,000 spectators and lasted 14 hours, featuring numerous musicians such as Hannes Wader, Dieter Süverkrüp, Franz-Josef Degenhardt, Hanns-Dieter Hüsch, Die 3 Tornados, Wolfgang Niedecken (BAP), and Ina Deter. In 2023, the band received the Holger Czukay Honorary Award from the City of Cologne for their lifetime artistic achievements.

Their musical style is considered to be krautrock.

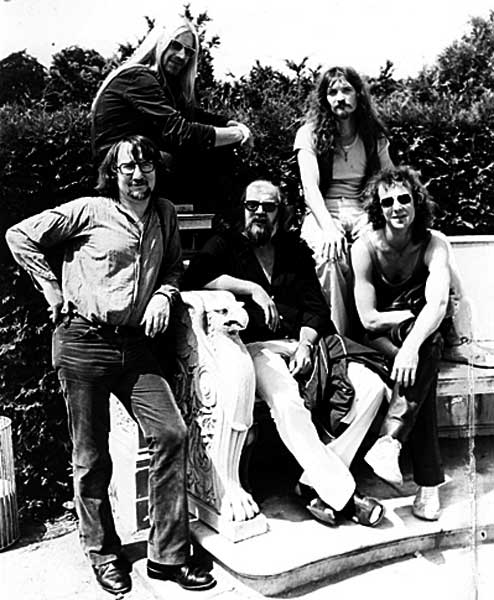
Floh de Cologne 1978: From left to right: Dieter Klemm, Vridolin Enxing, Hansi Frank, Theo König, Dick Städtler

== Cabaret, beat, rock ==
After the originally conventional cabaret group Floh de Cologne experienced underground bands like the Mothers of Invention, the Fugs, and the Edgar Broughton Band at the Essen Song Days in 1968 – where the group itself performed two special programs – they stylistically reoriented themselves with their album 7. Programm, combining agitational texts with beat music and a stage show to create so-called "agitation revues" and developing into one of the leading political rock bands.

In 1970, Floh de Cologne signed an exclusive record deal with the label Ohr/Metronome for the production Fließbandbabys-Beatshow and other releases. Metronome producer Rolf-Ulrich Kaiser was instrumental in the development of the so-called krautrock scene of those years. In 1971, Floh de Cologne created Profitgeier, the first German-language rock opera. In the three-movement Geyer Symphony of 1973, the band incorporated original excerpts from political speeches given at the funeral of the German industrialist Friedrich Flick into their music.

With the cantata for rock band Mumien ('Mummies'), the band responded to the 1973 coup in Chile, including a musical setting of the last speech by the ousted president Salvador Allende. That same year, the group collaborated with Hans Werner Henze on alternative settings of the Chilean anthem (Dieser chilenische Sommer war süß; 1974), with lyrics by Rudi Bergmann (born 1950). The premiere took place on May 31, 1974, in Essen (Grugahalle: memorial concert for Víctor Jara, also a solidarity event for the resistance in Chile).

Their collaboration with Mauricio Kagel at the "Cologne Courses for Political Music" (1975) also transcended national borders. In the rock opera Koslowsky, for which the band had researched on location for a year, Floh de Cologne traced the fate of a worker from the Ruhr area who comes to Bavaria to work at the Maxhütte steelworks in 1980.

== Theater ==
Less well-known, but essential for the band's development, were their works for the theater. These included collaborations with Roberto Ciulli at the Cologne Schauspielhaus: Ein Neuer Florentinerhut (A New Florentine Hat) after Eugène Labiche (published by Hartmann & Stauffacher, Cologne); with the Markgrafen-Theater Erlangen and the Staatstheater Wiesbaden: Rotkäppchen – ein Märchen mit viel Rock und Pop und Rumtata(Little Red Riding Hood – A Fairy Tale with Much Rock and Pop and Rumtata) after Yevgeny Schwartz (published by Hartmann & Stauffacher, Cologne). Further works followed with a smaller lineup after the band's dissolution (Dick Städtler, Theo König, Vridolin Enxing): at the Grillo-Theater Essen, together with David Esrig, a new version of Carlo Goldoni's Der Krieg (The War) (1984, Sessler-Verlag, Vienna); Babette oder peu à peu with Helmut Ruge at the Markgrafen-Theater Erlangen (Babette or Little by Little) (1986); and also there: Das Mädchen mit den Schwefelhölzern (The Little Match Girl) (1986).

== Stage programs ==
Each Floh de Cologne stage program was accompanied by a programmatic poster. The back contained the complete text of the program and, where applicable, "instructions" for action and references to literature for further "private revolutionary activity." The front was designed by friends such as HR Giger, Dieter Süverkrüp, Stefan Siegert, and Wolfgang Niedecken. These posters and the LPs were sold by the group themselves after the performances, just as they did everything else themselves; there were no professional roadies. It was part of the group's code of honor to do their own work whenever possible, thereby keeping ticket prices low so that their target audiences (apprentices, young workers, students, and schoolchildren) could access the shows as easily as possible.

A quote from a 1983 program booklet:

Floh de Cologne, that's no gold record and no easy money, no place in the charts or prime-time television, no art or cultural prize, and no subsidies. That's just bad luck.

=== Individual shows for the stage ===
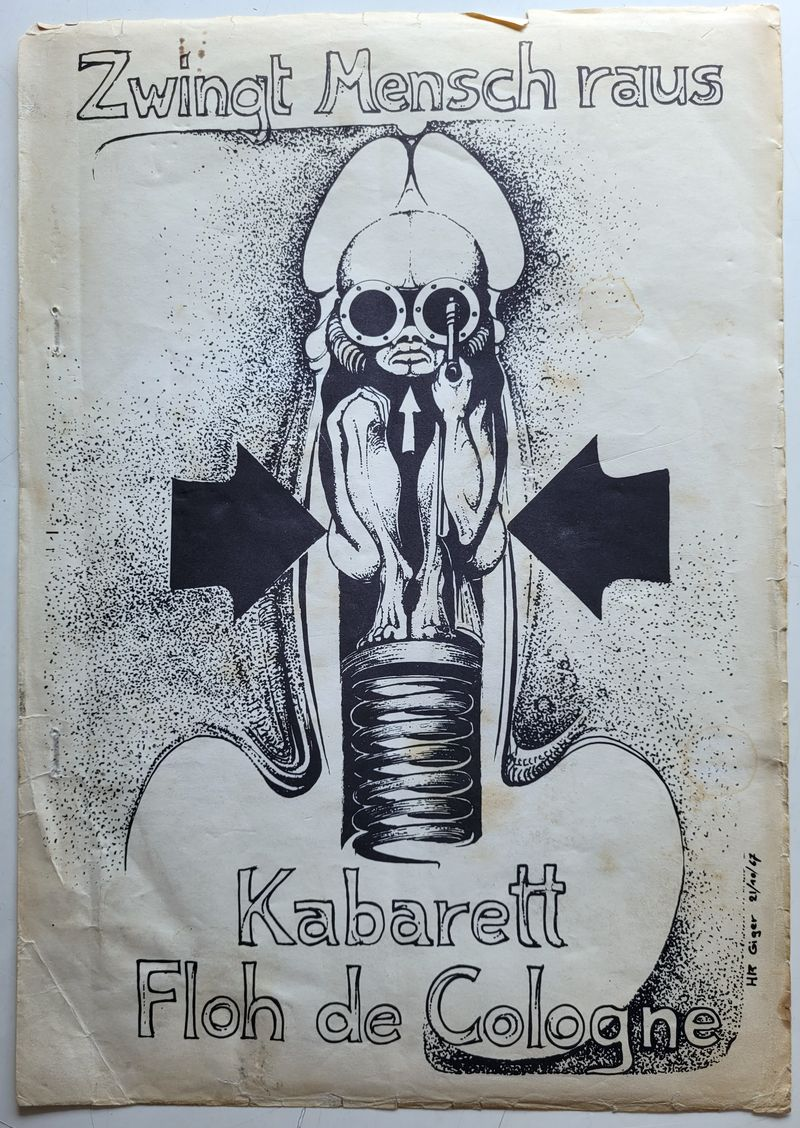
Poster Zwingt Mensch raus Floh de Cologne, 1968, by H.R. Giger

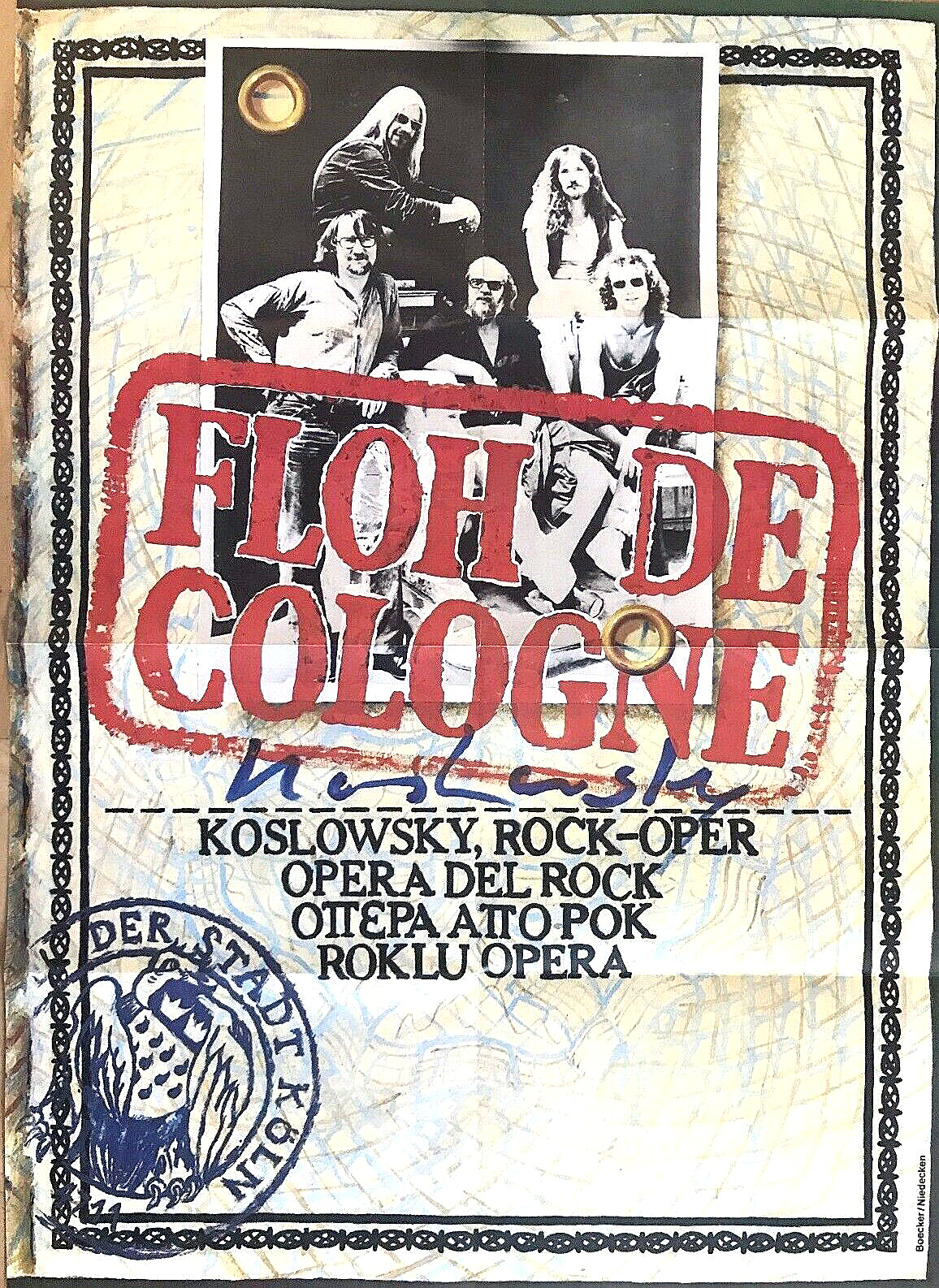
Poster for the Koslowsky rock show by Wolfgang Niedecken

- Vor Gebrauch Kopf schütteln 1966
- Tra-Ri-Tra-Ra, die Pest ist da 1966
- SimSAlabimbambambaSAladUSAladim 1967
- Zwingt Mensch Raus 1968
- 7. Programm 1969
- Fließbandbabys Beat Show 1969
- Rockoper Profitgeier 1970
- Rock-Jazz-Rakete Lucky Streik 1972
- Geier-Symphonie in Rock-Dur 1973
- Mumien, Kantate für Rockband 1974
- Rock-Show TILT 1975
- Rock-Revue Profitgeier & Co. 1976
- Prima Freiheit 1978
- Rockoper Koslowsky 1979
- Faaterland 1982

== Filmography and radio works ==
Year	Title	Media / genre	Notes
1967	The Floh de Cologne sketch "SPDeia"	Television	Cut from a broadcast about the Essen Cabaret Days.
1969	Zwingt Mensch raus	Television	Production canceled by WDR due to alleged "hardcore pornographic tendencies."
1970	Das wunderbare Geträume von Taifun-Willi	Radio play	Music for the play by Dick Higgins.
1970	Fließbandbaby	Television/Concert	Live broadcast planned by Radio Bremen; canceled two days prior.
1971	Profitgeier	Television	Production canceled by WDR directors Scholl-Latour and Höfer.
1971	(Unnamed program)	Television	Canceled by ORF; fee successfully claimed in court.
1971	Schlußwort and Schlußwort 2	Radio play	Music for the plays by Richard Hey.
1972	Ende gut, alles schlecht	Radio musical	Music for the work by Richard Hey.
1973	Das Kraftwerk	Radio play	Music and songs; written by Jens Hagen and Günter Wallraff.
1973	Das Trauerspiel	TV film	Music and lyrics; directed by Peter Voigt.
1975	Die Aufsteiger-Saga	TV film	Music and title song; directed by Rolf Schübel.
1975	Grüße aus Neckarsulm	Film	Music; directed by Hannes Karnick and Wolfgang Richter.
1975	Good bye, GI	Radio ballad	Music and lyrics; co-authored with Jens Hagen.
1975	Die Gruppe Floh de Cologne	TV film	Participation in the film by Peter Voigt.
1976	Südfrüchte aus Oberndorf	TV film	Music; directed by Wolfgang Landgraeber.
1977	Das Betriebsjubiläum	TV film	Music and title song; directed by Rolf Schübel.
1978	Panteon Militar	TV film	Music; directed by Wolfgang Landgraeber.
1978	Dreizack	TV magazine	Regular contributions to the political satire magazine on WDR.
1979	Ein Mann von Gestern	TV film	Music and participation; directed by Tom Toelle.
1980	Koslowsky	TV film	A WDR television production.
1980	Das Land der Rosen und Nachtigallen	TV film	Music; directed by Yoash Tatari.
1981	Mitbestimmung im Visier	TV film	Music; directed by Yoash Tatari.

In 1977, DEFA filmed a two-part documentary about the group (directed by Rainer Ackermann, cinematography by Thomas Plenert).

In 2019, Part 1 of the US DVD series Krautrock, titled Romantic Warrior IV, was released. The series presents extensive videos and interviews with representatives of the German Krautrock scene. Part 1 covers the Düsseldorf and Cologne groups, including CAN, Kraftwerk, and Floh de Cologne.

In 2023, OK Projekt Berlin produced a visualization of the Chilean cantata Mumien and in 2025 of Fließbandbaby's Beat-Show. That same year, Caro Gubig created a video for the ballad Ballade von Samstag auf Sonntag from the rock revue Faaterland.

The 2025 film Köln 75 uses the song Sei Ruhig Fließbandbaby from Fließbandbaby's Beat-Show in its entirety.

== Discography ==
Floh de Cologne produced their LPs during their contract with OHR/Metronome at Dieter Dierks' studio, where Wallenstein, Embryo, Tangerine Dream, Witthüser & Westrupp, Ash Ra Tempel, Hoelderlin, Jeronimo, and other later German rock greats also recorded. After moving to Pläne Records, they recorded at one of the most important recording studios for German, and later international, pop avant-garde music, run by Conny Plank, considered the "midwife" of so-called Krautrock. There they met, among others, Holger Czukay, Can, Grobschnitt, Kraan, Zupfgeigenhansel, Gianna Nannini, and others. The LP Koslowsky was produced in 1980 at Martin Hömberg's Tonstudio am Dom. Another German Krautrock luminary, Zeus B. Held (Birth Control, Guru Guru), served as the sound engineer. Since 2024, ZYX Music has been releasing the former LPs on both vinyl and CD in a carefully edited edition. Releases so far include: Mumien (2024), Koslowsky (2025), Faaterland (2025). Since spring 2026, ZYX Verlag has been publishing a complete reissue of all LPs in a CD edition (10 CD box) and 2 vinyl boxes of 6 LPs each (Vol. 1 and Vol. 2) to mark the group's sixty-year anniversary. The publisher writes:

The 10-CD box set is a retrospective of the political rock band Floh de Cologne and contains all recordings from their key albums and songs. It includes the following CDs: Mummies, Geyer Symphony, Lucky Strike, Profit Vulture, Assembly Line Babies Beat Show, Koslowsky & Faaterland, Vietnam, Prima Freedom, Little Red Riding Hood, Tilt! The box set offers a comprehensive overview of the band's entire oeuvre and is aimed at collectors and music lovers who want to experience German protest and rock history in a high-quality edition.

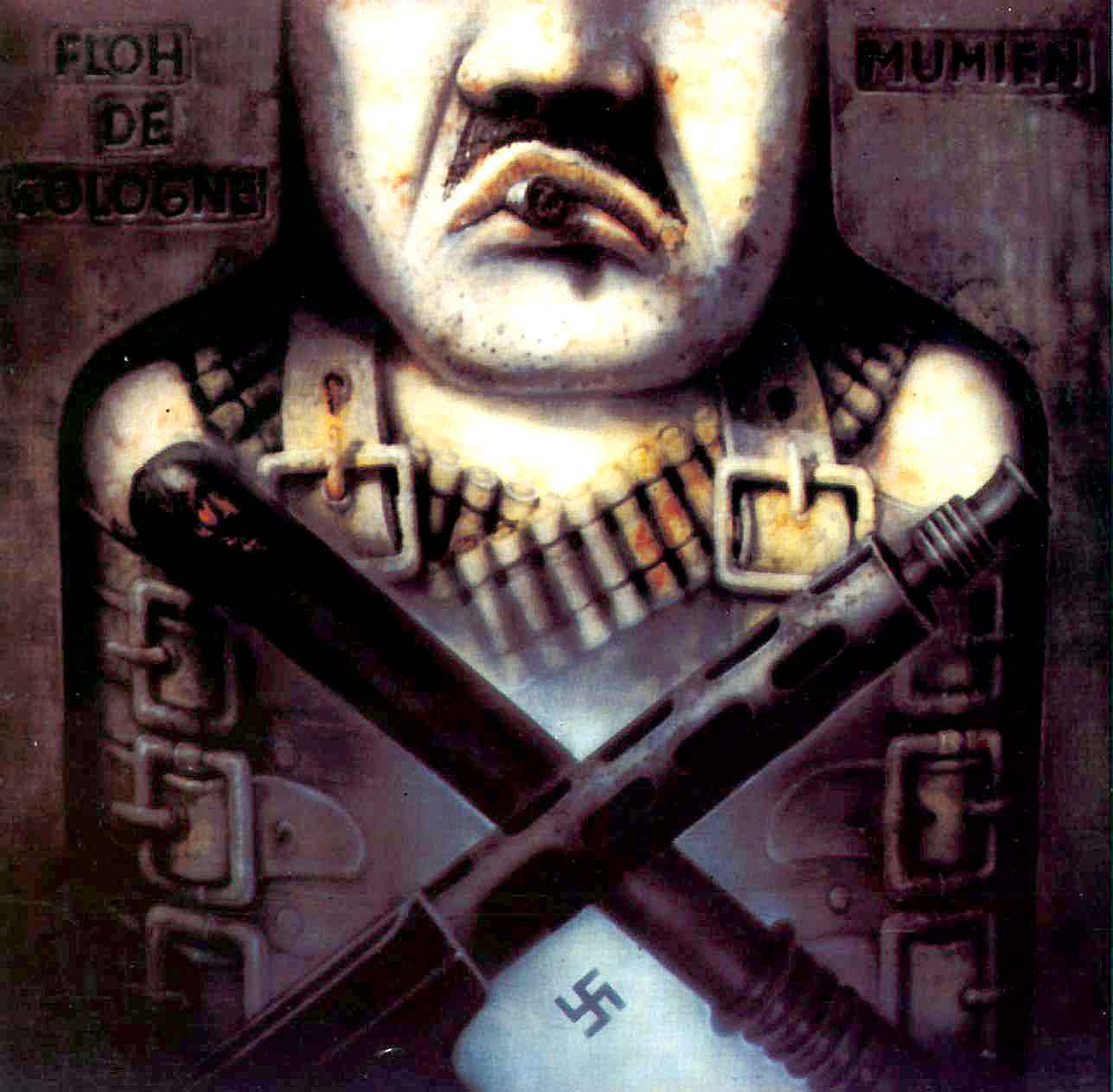
Cover of the LP Mumien by HR Giger

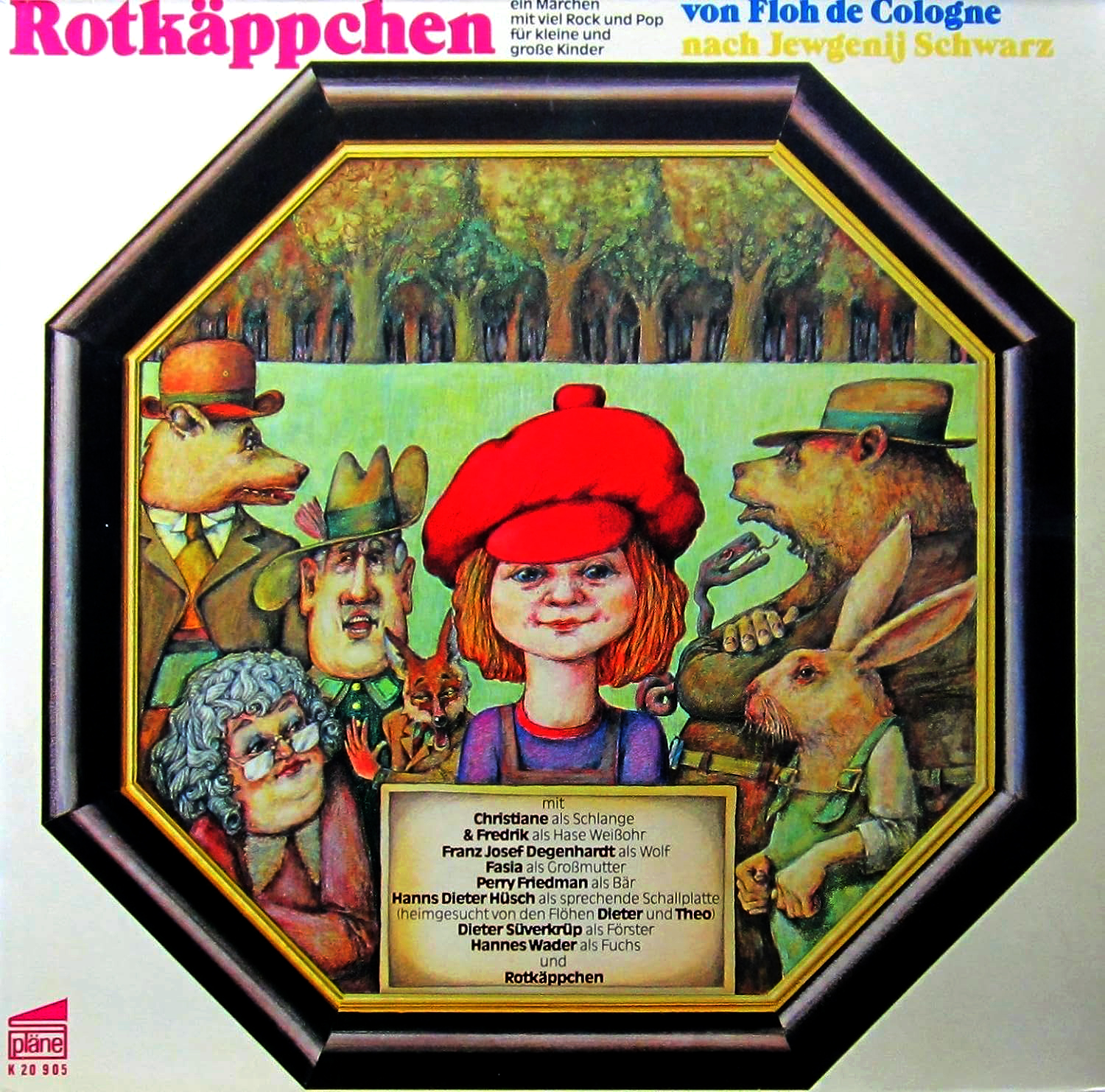
Cover of the LP Rotkäppchen

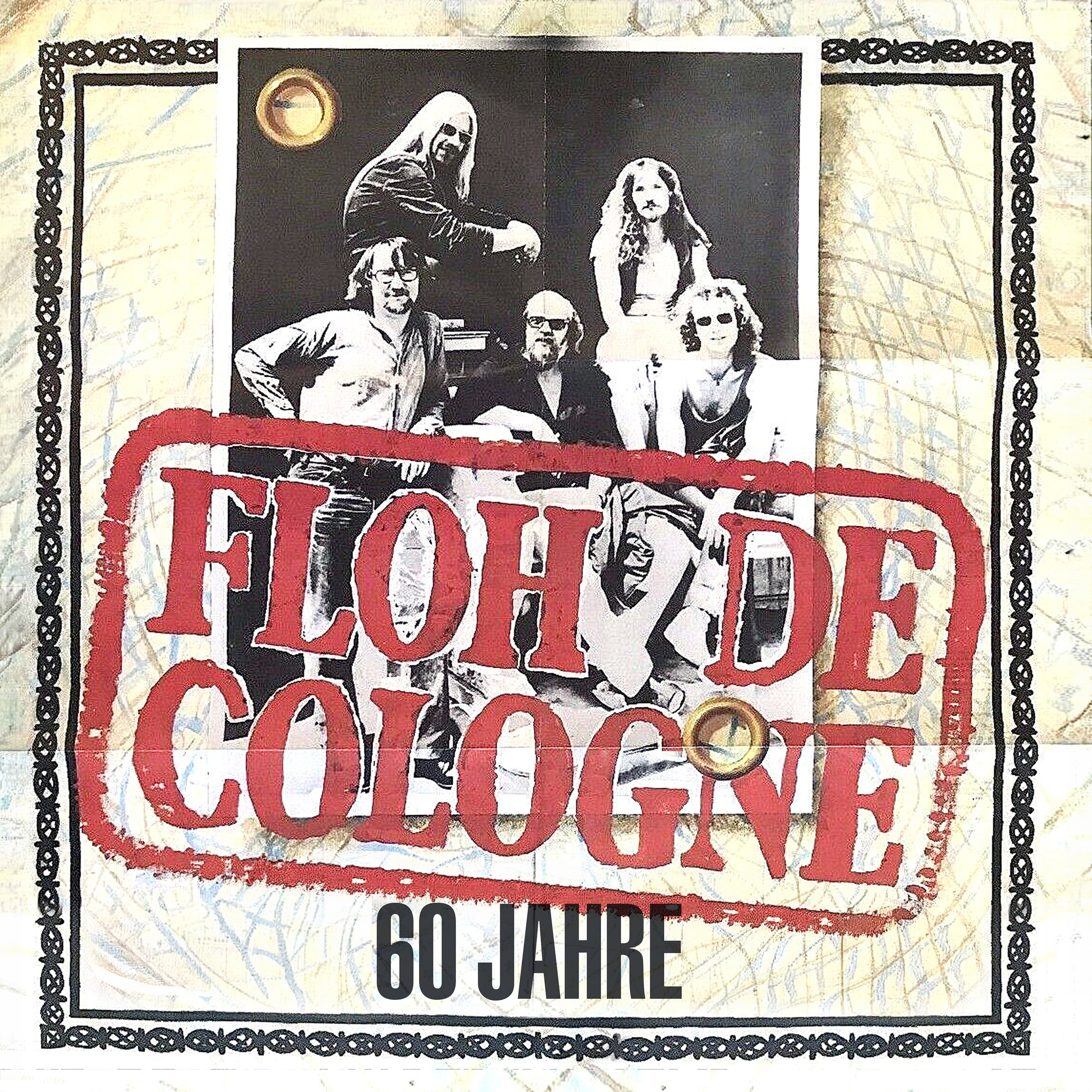
60 Years of Floh de Cologne - Cover of the anniversary edition of all records

=== Albums ===
Year	Title	Label	Notes
1968	Vietnam	Pläne	with Dieter Süverkrüp
1970	Fließbandbabys Beat-Show	Ohr	
1971	Rockoper Profitgeier	Ohr	
1973	Lucky Streik	Ohr	Double LP
1974	Geier-Symphonie	Pläne	
1974	Mumien – Kantate für Rockband	Pläne	
1975	Tilt	Pläne	
1977	Rotkäppchen	Pläne	with various artists (nach Jewgeni Schwarz)
1978	Prima Freiheit	Pläne	
1980	Koslowsky	Pläne	
1983	Faaterland	Pläne	
2026	60 Years of Floh de Cologne	ZYX Music	Complete edition (CD/Vinyl)

=== Singles and EPs ===
Year	Title	Label	Notes
1970	"St. Pauli, du mein Loch zur Welt" / "Bruno-Lied"	Ohr	
1972	"Emil in Erkenschwick" / "Zahlen musst Du"	Ohr	
1973	"Der Löwenthaler" / "Bayerisches Heimatlied"	Ohr	with Dieter Süverkrüp
1974	"Dieser chilenische Sommer war süß"	Pläne	
1983	"Hey Mama fix"	Pläne	

=== Compilations ===
Year	Title	Label	Notes
1970	Ohrenschmaus	Ohr	Double LP
1971	Lehrlinge zusammenhalten	Pläne	
1971	Warum ist die Banane krumm?	Pläne	
1971	Mitten ins Ohr	Ohr	Double LP
1974	Konzert für Chile	Pläne	Double LP

== Videography ==
- Romantic Warriors IV: Krautrock (2019)

== Literature ==
- Profitgeier und andere Vögel. Agitational Text, Songs, Reports (= Wagenbach Quarterly; 53). Klaus Wagenbach Publishing House, Berlin 1971.
- Gerd Wollschon, Floh de Cologne: Sudel-Lexikon. Satirical Dictionary for Learned Germans. 250 Bits and Keywords with Many Practical Drawings. Satire Publishing House, Cologne 1977, ISBN 3-88268-001-6.
- Rock gegen Rechts. Weltkreis Publishing House, Dortmund 1980.
- Andreas Ciesielski: Für die Zukunft sehn wir rot. Report on "Floh de Cologne." In: Ernst Günther, Heinz P. Hofmann, Walter Rösler (eds.): Kassette. An Almanac for Stage, Podium, and Circus Ring (= Kassette). No. 5. Henschelverlag Art and Society, Berlin 1981, pp. 7–15.
