= Cosmic Couriers =

German music label

Cosmic Couriers / Cosmic Music
- Founded: 1973
- Founder: Rolf-Ulrich Kaiser
- Defunct: 1975
- Status: Inactive
- Genre: Krautrock
- Country of origin: Germany

Cosmic Couriers / Cosmic Music (also known as by its German name Kosmische Kuriere / Kosmische Musik) was a West German experimental/space-rock label set up by Rolf-Ulrich Kaiser in 1973 following his association with Ohr and Pilz. A number of influential records in the krautrock genre were released on Cosmic Couriers, including Klaus Schulze's Cyborg and Ash Ra Tempel/Timothy Leary's Seven Up.

Cosmic Couriers released many important Krautrock titles by artists including Klaus Schulze, Ash Ra Tempel, Manuel Göttsching, Wallenstein, Popol Vuh, and others, including Walter Wegmüller's Tarot. However Kaiser got into trouble when he started releasing albums under the name of the Cosmic Jokers, a supergroup made up of artists who did not even realise they were participating in such a project: Kaiser had taken recordings of informal jams by various artists from the label and had released them under the Cosmic Jokers name without their knowledge. The musicians affected - and in particular Klaus Schulze - were far from impressed with Kaiser's release of this material and took legal action. As a result of this and his involvement with Timothy Leary, Kaiser's contracts with his bands were voided by the West German courts thus spelling the end for the Kosmische Musik label.

== Releases ==
The following albums were released on the Cosmic Couriers label:

- Timothy Leary & Ash Ra Tempel - Seven Up (KK 58.001)
- Sergius Golowin - Lord Krishna von Goloka (KK 58.002)
- Walter Wegmüller - Tarot (2LP) (KK 2/58.003)
- Witthüser+Westrupp - Live *68-*73 (2LP) (KM 2/58.004)
- Klaus Schulze - Cyborg (2LP) (KM 2/58.005)
- Wallenstein - Cosmic Century (KM 58.006)
- Ash Ra Tempel - Starring Rosi (KM 58.007)
- The Cosmic Jokers - The Cosmic Jokers (KM 58.008)
- Popol Vuh - Seligpreisung (KM 58.009)
- Galactic Supermarket (Cosmic Jokers) - Galactic Supermarket (KM 58.010)
- Various - Sci-Fi Party (conceptual sampler) (KM 58.011)
- The Cosmic Jokers & Sternenmädchen - Gilles Zeitschiff (KM 58.012)
- The Cosmic Jokers & Sternenmädchen - Planeten Sit-In (KM 58.013)
- Wallenstein - Stories, Songs & Symphonies (KM 58.014)
- Ash Ra Tempel/Manuel Göttsching - Inventions for Electric Guitar (KM 58.015)
- Mythos - Dreamlab (KM 58.016)
- Popol Vuh - Einsjäger und Siebenjäger (KM 58.017)
- Various - Take Your Headphones (promo sampler)

== See also ==
- Krautrock
- Psychedelic music
- List of record labels
- List of electronic music record labels
