= The Cosmic Jokers (album) =

Studio album by The Cosmic Jokers
- Released: 1974
- Recorded: February 1973-May 1973
- Studio: Dierks Studios
- Genre: Krautrock, space rock, ambient, electronic
- Length: 42:02
- Label: Kosmische Musik
- Producer: Gille Lettmann, Rolf-Ulrich Kaiser

The Cosmic Jokers chronology
The Cosmic Jokers (1974)	Galactic Supermarket (1974)

Professional ratings
Review scores
Source	Rating
Allmusic	4.5/5 stars

The Cosmic Jokers is an album by a krautrock supergroup The Cosmic Jokers. It is a compilation of jam sessions by various Cosmic Couriers musicians, specifically Klaus Schulze, Harald Grosskopf, Manuel Göttsching, Dieter Dierks and Jürgen Dollase.

== Track listing ==
No.	Title	Length
1.	"Galactic Joke"	22:38
2.	"Cosmic Joy"	19:24
