= Metropolis (band) =

- Genres: Experimental rock; Art rock; Krautrock
- Years active: 1973–1976
- Labels: PAN, Ariola, BMG

Metropolis was a German band in the mid-1970s from West Berlin, initiated by former members of other Berlin bands Tom Hildebrand (Mythos) and Manfred Opitz and Michael Westphal (Zarathustra). Michael Duwe joined them after returning from the recording of the album Seven Up with Ash Ra Tempel and Timothy Leary. Guitarist Helmut Binzer, who came from the south of Germany, and singer Ute Kannenberg, at that time better known as Tanja Berg in German hit parades ("Na Na Hey Hey Goodbye" – German version), completed the band soon after.

== History ==
For almost a year the band worked hard in their rehearsal room at the "Wrangel Kaserne", former Prussian barracks that were transformed into numerous rehearsal rooms in West-Berlin's Kreuzberg district, composing and arranging the tracks for their first and, as it turned out, only album.

They signed a contract with the German record company Ariola (BMG), and in winter 1973/74 they started recording in Munich's "Studio 70", which had been pointed out to them by their friends and colleagues Agitation Free. They were supported by a small but brilliant classical ensemble, directed by Hartmut Westphal, well known German arranger and brother of the band’s bass player Michael.

Clearly influenced by the music of bands like early Genesis, Soft Machine or Van Der Graaf Generator, they experimented with 5/4, 7/4 or 11/4 rhythms and created a music that had symphonic, as well as psychedelic parts, jazzy influences combined with total free experimental sounds, driving-aggressive rock voices or folksong style harmony vocals, a pretty unusual mixture at that time.

Their lyrics, written in English, were in general a criticism of the state of civilization and ecology, with occasional romantic influences. (The front cover of their album shows a seemingly intact landscape that gets threatened by a monster that develops out of polluted air). Shortly after album and single were released in early summer 1974 Ute Kannenberg and Helmut Binzer left the band.

But Metropolis went on, playing concerts in Berlin and West-Germany (Germany was still divided) and working on a new programme. Based on the story "Kaleidoscope" of Ray Bradbury's "Illustrated Man" they created a multi media show that had its premiere on Christmas Eve 1975 at Berlin's Kant Kino. The light show was created by Metropolis' roady and technician Alf Heuer with slides, liquid gel projections, film, stroboscope, spot lights and fog machines. A so-called "scent show" with the help of electric cooking plates was added. Along with new compositions they also played their version of Mr. Spaceman, the song already being recorded and meant to be their new single. But after a last open air concert in the summer of 1976 the band finally split. All members started different new projects.

After the re-release of their first album in 2020 by Sony Music, the band finally released their version of "Mr. Spaceman" 48 years after the song had been recorded in the summer of 1975 by producer Udo Arndt (Nena, Rio Reiser, Ton Steine Scherben or Spliff).

== Trivia ==
The album was recorded in the heavy winter 1973/74 while the first oil crisis took place. With their equipment loaded into their Mercedes 319 band bus the band went from Berlin to Munich on a nearly empty highway, because for weekends special permission was needed to be allowed to drive the German Autobahn. Also to print the records vinyl was needed, made of oil, and at some point it was questioned if the record company would get sufficient supplies to actually go on with this project. Fortunately for the band they did.

"Why this German band remains overlooked is beyond my imagination."

— Drago Museveni on "Cun Cun Na Ma"

The 1980s Canadian new wave band Strange Advance originally named themselves Metropolis in 1980 but changed their name due to the existence of this band.

== Members ==
- Helmut Binzer (guitar) – went to Munich and played and taught guitar.
- Michael Duwe (vocals & guitar) – kept on writing songs for theater, a children rock album and founded Berlin based Albatros Concerts. In 1978 he started his solo project Mickie D's Unicorn and later became composer for soundtracks.
- Thomas Hildebrand (drums & lyrics) – played with Mythos, Mother Cake and Tequila Sunrise.
- Ute Kannenberg (vocals) – sang with Os Mundi and Tequila Sunrise, formed later her own Ute K band, produced radio plays and became disc jockey for jazz music on German radio stations.
- Manfred Opitz (Hammond organ, keyboards & lyrics) founded the new wave band Lilli Berlin (together with Harald Grosskopf) and composed music for theater plays and soundtracks.
- Michael Westphal (bass) – played shortly with Ash Ra Tempel and joined Berlin cover bands like Tequila Sunrise and Group 66.
- Michael Sauber (technician) – When Metropolis was founded he played the saxophone and flutes but quit soon to become regular sound engineer at Berlin's Quasimodo venue.
- Alfred Heuer (technician/roady) – went to Bielefeld and got happy.
- Bodo Neumann (technician/roady) – worked for REVUE, a Berlin-based PA company.
- Lutz Manowsky (technician/roady) – maintained the bands 2 Mercedes 319 band busses and ended up owning one of Berlin’s best Portuguese restaurants on Kurfürstendamm, Luisiada.

== Discography ==
=== Albums ===
- Metropolis (LP – PAN/Ariola 1974; Sony Music 2021)

=== Singles ===
- "Birth / Super Plastic Club" (single – PAN/Ariola 1974)
- "Mr. Spaceman" (single – Navigator 2023)

=== Sampler ===
- Metropolis: Dreamweaver on: Various: Teil 4 – KRAUT! – Die innovativen Jahre des Krautrock 1968–1979 (Bear Family Records 2021, compiled by Burghard Rausch)

== Notes ==
=== Sources ===
- Christian Graf: "Rocklexikon Deutschland". Verlag Schwarzkopf & Schwarzkopf, 2002, ISBN 3-89602-273-3
- Steven & Alan Freeman: The crack in the cosmic egg: encyclopedia of Krautrock, Kosmische musik & other progressive, experimental & electronic musics from Germany, 1996, Audition Publ., Leicester ISBN 0-9529506-0-X
