= Seven Up (album) =

Studio album by Timothy Leary with Ash Ra Tempel
- Released: 1973
- Recorded: August 1972 at Sinus Studios, Bern, Switzerland, overdubs recorded October 1972 at Dierks Studios in Stommeln, Germany
- Genres: Krautrock, psychedelic rock, space rock
- Length: 37:18
- Label: Cosmic Couriers
- Producers: Rolf-Ulrich Kaiser, Gille Lettmann

Ash Ra Tempel chronology
Schwingungen (1972)	Seven Up (1973)	Join Inn (1973)

Seven Up is the third studio album by German krautrock band Ash Ra Tempel and their only album recorded in collaboration with American psychologist/drug advocate Timothy Leary. It was first released in 1973.

== Background and recording ==
Seven Up was mainly recorded at the Sinus Studio in Bern, Switzerland in August 1972. Some tracks, like the vocals on "Downtown" by Portia Nkomo and Michael Duwe, were recorded later at Studio Dieter Dierks near Cologne, Germany.

Timothy Leary was living in exile in Switzerland at the time of the album's creation, having escaped from prison in San Luis Obispo, California in September 1970.

The name "Seven Up" was thought up by lyricist Brian Barritt, after the group were given a bottle of the lemonade drink 7 Up that had been spiked with LSD.

== Legacy ==
Seven Up is made up of an extended improvisation that is divided into two parts – "Space" and "Time" – over two sides of the vinyl record. David Stubbs writes in his krautrock history Future Days (2014) that Seven Up is often considered to be "a bit of a mishap of an album, whose making is far more interesting than its outcome." He questioned how its musical and theoretical parts were intended to mix and whether the outcome relates to the record's intentions, and believed it does not cast LSD as a creative tool in a positive light, adding, "if Seven Up is testimony to anything, it was to Leary's ineffectiveness in using rock music as a medium by which to take the world by storm."

Mark Prendgrast wrote in The Ambient Century (1999) that Seven Up is a "highly self-indulgent" album of Ash Ra Tempel jamming with 'acid guru' Leary. Jim DeRogatis writes that the 'acid guru' Leary howls "horny improvised blues lyrics" under the album's "psychedelic cacophony", saying it was taped live in Switzerland after Leary had escaped from an American prison. In his book Gathering of the Tribe: Acid (2022), Mark Goodall notes that Ash Ra Tempel have admitted that Seven Up is "a series of individual jams stitched together afterwards with electronic washes of sound." Though Goodall notes that Leary's practical contribution is "limited", he believes Leary's overall "direction" may have been the crucial element of inspiration for the recording, adding: "As a deconstruction of rock and roll clichés filtered through the confusion and thrill of the electronic space-age, it works well." In The Rough Guide to Rock (2003), Rolf Semprebon noted the "more song-oriented first section" with Leary's vocals, followed by "several conventional rock songs melded into a single track melded by spacey electronic segues."

John Bush of AllMusic considers Seven Up to continue Schwingungen's "bizarre, bluesy psychedelia" on side one, while exploring deep space rock on side two. Bush believes Leary's fanbase would be surprised that is one of five voices peppered throughout the record and sometimes "sounds more like a poor man's Eric Burdon than an acid visionary might", adding that the space jams on side two end with a rush of air resembling a vacuum cleaner, the only part of the album "that acid and Kraut fans expected."

Regarding its specific songs, Stubbs criticised the opening number, "Downtown", for being a "surprisingly lethargic bluesy clop that feels antithetical to everything on their albums hitherto", comparing it to their early pre-Krautrock incarnation, the Steeplechase Blues Band. He speculated whether Dierks bookended the opening song with "washes of abstract, hoovering electronics" (psychedelic in style) to compensate for the lo-fi, rudimentary recordings and "general lack of sonic inspiration." Stubbs found side two of Seven Up more impressive, especially for Géttsching's dominant guitars, "stepping off the edge of planet earth's blues into uncharted, cosmic recesses without any foothold."

== Track listing ==
Music by Ash Ra Tempel, lyrics by Timothy Leary and Brian Barritt. In the liner notes, both titles are listed as "Live from 'The Bern Festival'" even though there were overdubs at Dierks Studios.

No.	Title	Length
1.	"Space: I. Downtown; II. Power Drive; III. Right Hand Lover; IV. Velvet Genes"	16:03
2.	"Time: I. Timeship; II. Neuron; III. SHe"	21:15

== Personnel ==
- Hartmut "Hawk" Enke - bass, guitar, synth/electronics
- Manuel Göttsching - guitar, synth/electronics
- Timothy Leary - voice, "direction", lyrics
- Michael Duwe - voice, flute

Additional personnel

- Brian Barritt - voice, lyrics, arrangements
- Liz Elliott - voice
- Bettina Hohls - voice
- Portia Nkomo - voice
- Steve Schroyder - organ, synth/electronics
- Dieter Burmeister - drums
- Tommie Engel - drums
- Dieter Dierks - synthesizer, radio downtown, recording
- Klaus D. Müller - performer (no role specified)
- Peter Geitner - design (cover)
- Walter Wegmüller - painting (cover paintings)
- Rolf-Ulrich Kaiser - production
- Gille Lettmann - co-production
- Kurt Zimmermann - recording (Sinus-studio)
