= Join Inn =

Studio album by Ash Ra Tempel
- Released: 1973
- Recorded: 1972
- Genre: Krautrock; psychedelic rock; ambient; drone
- Length: 43:33
- Label: Ohr
- Producer: Rolf-Ulrich Kaiser

Ash Ra Tempel chronology
Seven Up (1973)	Join Inn (1973)	Starring Rosi (1973)

Professional ratings
Review scores
Source	Rating
Allmusic	3.5/5 stars
Head Heritage	positive

Join Inn is the fourth album by Krautrock band Ash Ra Tempel. It was recorded at Studio Dierks by Dieter Dierks during breaks in the sessions for the Walter Wegmüller album Tarot. It was originally released on LP by Ohr in Berlin, catalogue number OMM 556032. Each side of the LP comprises one long track.

Join Inn marks the end of the collaboration with Klaus Schulze. However, together with Ash Ra Tempel, their eponymous first album, it is considered a highlight of the Krautrock movement.

== Track listing ==
All tracks composed by Manuel Göttsching, Hartmut Enke and Klaus Schulze.

1. "Freak 'n' Roll" – 19:15
2. "Jenseits" – 24:18

== Personnel ==
- Hartmut Enke – bass
- Manuel Göttsching – guitar
- Rosi Müller – vocals (credited as 'Rosi')
- Klaus Schulze – drums, organ, Synthi A
