= Schwingungen =

Studio album by Ash Ra Tempel
- Released: 1972
- Genres: Krautrock, psychedelic rock
- Length: 38:40
- Label: Ohr
- Producer: Rolf-Ulrich Kaiser

Ash Ra Tempel chronology
Ash Ra Tempel (1971)	Schwingungen (1972)	Seven Up (1973)

Professional ratings
Review scores
Source	Rating
Allmusic	4.5/5 stars

Schwingungen is the second album by the Krautrock band Ash Ra Tempel. It was released in 1972 on Ohr. It has been re-released four times, most recently in 2011 on MG Art Records.

The album's first song "Light" is heavily inspired by Peter Green's playing on Fleetwood Mac's "Albatross".

== Track listing ==
Side one — "Light and Darkness"
No.	Title	Length
1.	"Light: Look at Your Sun"	6:20
2.	"Darkness: Flowers Must Die"	12:20

Side two
No.	Title	Length
1.	"Schwingungen: "Suche"; "Liebe"	19:00

== Personnel ==
- Hartmut Enke – guitar, bass, electronics
- Manuel Göttsching – guitar, organ, electronics, choir
- Wolfgang Müller – drums, vibraphone

Additional personnel

- Uli Popp – bongos
- Matthias Wehler – alto saxophone
- John L. – vocals, jaw harp, percussion

=== Production ===
- Bernd Bendig – artwork
- Dieter Dierks – engineer
- Jürgen 'Panzer' Dorrmann, Reinhard Kolms – photography
- Rolf-Ulrich Kaiser – producer
