= Michael Duwe =

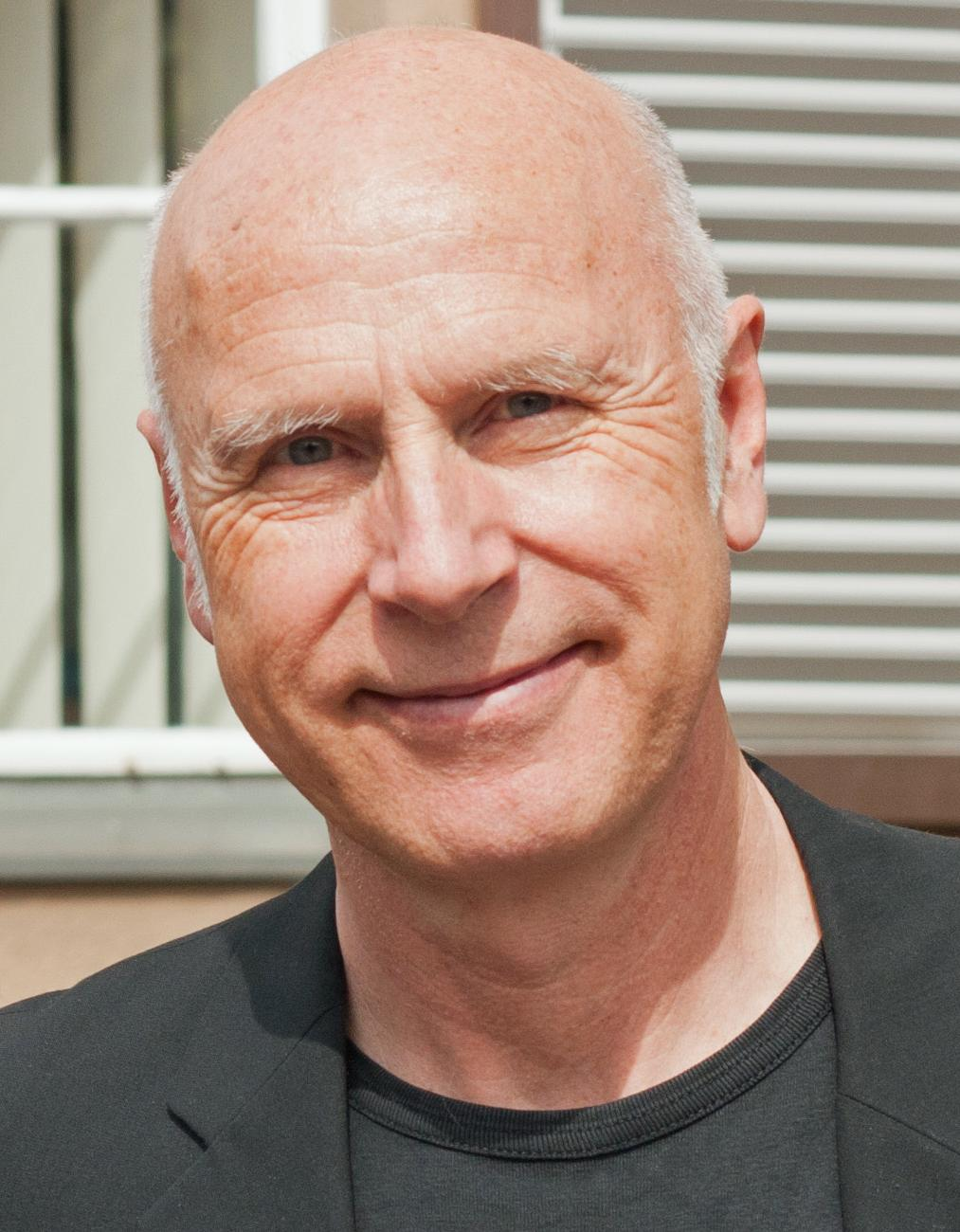
- Portrait of Michael Duwe

Background information
- Also known as: Mickie D, Mickie Duwe, Micky Duwe, Mickie D’s Unicorn
- Born: Berlin-West, Germany
- Genres: Soundtracks, Electronic Rock & Pop
- Occupations: composer, singer, songwriter, producer
- Instruments: Vocals, Guitar, Keyboards
- Years active: 1968–present
- Labels: IC-Records, Warner Bros., Edel Records, Navigator
- Website: www.MickieD.com

Michael Duwe, aka Mickie D, is a composer, producer and musician from Berlin (former West-Berlin), Germany. He is composing music for German television series, documentaries or film. Besides several solo albums, including his 1978 masterpiece‚ Mickie D’s Unicorn, he has worked with different bands, musicians and producers like Agitation Free, Ash Ra Tempel, Klaus Schulze, Michael Hoenig, Michael Shrieve, Wolfgang Loos (Alphaville) or Conny Plank.

== Early years ==
He started out as singer/ songwriter in the late 1960s, was an early founding member of Agitation Free and toured with the German cast of the musical HAIR in 1970/ 71. In 1972 Ash Ra Tempel asked him to join them as singer for their recording of the psychedelic album Seven Up, that took place in collaboration with Timothy Leary in the Sinus Studio in Bern, Switzerland. 1973 he was founding member of the Berlin band Metropolis with whom he played and toured for the next three years. After recording the album Metropolis and releasing the single "Super Plastic Club", the band produced a multi-media show based on Ray Bradbury's The Illustrated Man, before they split in 1976.

While still with Metropolis he was asked to write the music score for – and perform in – the theater play Die Hälfte des Himmels und wir (La Moitié du ciel et nous) by French author and director Armand Gatti, which was played in 1975 at the Berlin Forum Theater.

In 1977 he founded Albatros Concerts and for a short time promoted bands like Patti Smith, Bob Marley, Blondie or early Dire Straits before he again concentrated on his career as composer and musician. Michael Hoenig asked to help him with a sequence that was meant to be a part of his first solo album “Departure from the Northern Wasteland“. So Duwe composed and played harmonies and the melody that then became the instrumental "Sun & Moon“.

When Klaus Schulze founded his IC-Label in 1978, Michael Duwe was the first artist signed. Together they produced his first solo work, Mickie D’s Unicorn, an album full of dragons, witches, fairies and elves, which set a milestone in the fusion of pop and synthesizer music at the time, and with guest musicians ranging from Manuel Göttsching (Ash Ra Tempel) to Michael Shrieve (Santana). Over the following years he produced five more solo albums, but none as successful as his first one.

== Later years ==
In the mid-'80s he founded his own production company Einhorn media & entertainment GmbH, and later, in close cooperation with Edel Records, the label Navigator. For the Berlin Akademie der Künste he helped to develop and manage two labels for contemporary music, “The Listening Room“ and “Academy“, wrote and produced the musical show X-94 and planned and directed, together with Christian Kneisel, the festival for young art & culture - “Z 2000“.

In 2002 Edel Records released the CD and the book "Erotic Fairytales“, written and performed by Mickie D and guests (like George Kranz). This production was based on authentic traditional erotic fairytales from all over the world, collected, edited and retold by Mickie D, and finally transformed into a musical that hit the stage the same year.

Since the mid 1990s he writes and produces soundtracks for German TV-documentaries, docu-dramas such as Sphinx - Geheimnisse der Geschichte (also known as ZDF Expedition), Terra-X and movies such as Polizeiruf 110, often in collaboration with his long-time partner Torsten Sense. He also composes music for meditation (Brenda Davies - Welcome Prosperity), plays the Ukulele with the Berlin Ukulele Orchestra and still is an occasional guest musician. His last project was solo guitar on "Salvation", a single of KMFDM’s last album Our Time Will Come (2014).

== Works (a selection) ==
=== Solo albums ===
- ’’Mickie D’s Unicorn’’ (1979)
- ’’Mickie D’s Unicorn - No Regrets’’ (1989)
- ’’Mickie D’s Unicorn - Aladdin’’ (1993)
- ’’Mickie D’s Erotic Fairytales’’ (2002)
- ’’Trance Vania - Dracula’’ (1994)

=== with Ash Ra Tempel ===
- ’’Seven Up (album)’’ (1972)
- ’’Tropical Heat’’ (1991)

=== with Agitation Free ===
- ’’Fragments’’ (1974)
- ’’Proletariersohn’’ radio play (1974)

=== with Metropolis ===
- ’’Metropolis’’ (1974)
- ’’Super Plastic Club’’ (1974)
- "Mr. Spaceman" (2023)

=== Producer and/or musician and/or composer ===
- KMFDM – Our Time Will Come (2014)
- Brenda Davies – Soulgarden (2006)
- Brenda Davies – Just Be (2005)
- Dance Of The World – Live (2000)
- Best Of Sean Connery (Edel 1993)
- Best Of Kevin Costner (Edel 1992)
- Raducano – Gipsy In Blue (Navigator 1990)
- Lu Lafayette’s Wolfsmond – Auf Heisser Spur (Navigator 1990)
- Around The World In 80 Days (Edel 1989)
- Secret Lovers – Too Young (Teldec 1988)
- Secret Lovers – I See It In Your Eyes (Teldec 1987)

== Soundtracks ==
=== Films ===
- ’’3 Chinesen Mit Dem Kontrabass’’ 20th Century Fox/ NDF
- ’’Polizeiruf 110- Taubers Angst’’
- ’’Polizeiruf 110- Die Mass ist voll“
- ’’Polizeiruf 110- Pech & Schwefel“
- ’’Der Mann Den Frauen Wollen“

=== Television documentaries ===
- ’’Die Tempelritter’’
- ’’Gefangen im Reich des Shogun’’
- ’’Die Rache des Regengottes’’
- ’’Königin vom Nil - Hatshepsut’’
- ’’Söhne der Wüste - Durch die Sahara’’
- ’’Söhne der Wüste - Durch Gobi & Taklamakan’’
- ’’Echnaton & Nofretete’’
- ’’Auf der Suche nach dem Gral“
- ’’Zerstört Karthago’’
- ’’Teufel auf der Seidenstrasse’’
- ’’Buddha’’
- ’’Mohammed’’
- ’’Jesus’’
- ’’Höllenfahrten“
