= Ash Ra Tempel (album) =

Studio album by Ash Ra Tempel
- Released: June 1971
- Recorded: 11 March 1971
- Genres: Krautrock; space rock; ambient; electronic
- Length: 45:04
- Label: Ohr

Ash Ra Tempel chronology
Ash Ra Tempel (1971)	Schwingungen (1972)

Professional ratings
Review scores
Source	Rating
AllMusic	4/5 stars
Head Heritage	(positive)

Ash Ra Tempel is the debut studio album by German Krautrock band Ash Ra Tempel. Engineered by Conny Plank, it was recorded in March 1971 and released in June 1971 on Ohr. It features guitarist Manuel Göttsching, drummer Klaus Schulze and bassist Hartmut Enke.

== Reception ==
AllMusic called the album "both astonishingly prescient and just flat out good, a logical extension of the space-jam-freakout ethos into rarified realms."

== Track listing ==
Side one
No.	Title	Length
1.	"Amboss"	19:40

Side two
No.	Title	Length
2.	"Traummaschine"	25:24

== Personnel ==
- Manuel Göttsching – vocals, electric guitar, electronics
- Hartmut Enke – bass guitar
- Klaus Schulze – drums, percussion, electronics

== Releases ==
- CD Ash Ra Tempel Spalax Music 2001
- CD Ash Ra Tempel Import 2002
- Ash Ra Tempel Import 2002
- CD First Japanese Import 2002
- CD Ash Ra Tempel Disk Union 2004
- LP Ash Ra Tempel Phantom Import Distribution 2004
- LP Ash Ra Tempel Spalax Music 2004
- CD Ash Ra Tempel MG.ART / Music Video Distribution 2012
