= Inventions for Electric Guitar =

Studio album by Ash Ra Tempel, Manuel Göttsching
- Released: 1975
- Recorded: July – August 1974
- Genres: Krautrock; electronic; minimalism; space rock
- Length: 45:55
- Label: Kosmische Musik
- Producer: Manuel Göttsching

Ash Ra Tempel, Manuel Göttsching chronology
Starring Rosi (1973)	Inventions for Electric Guitar (1975)	E2-E4 (1984)

Professional ratings
Review scores
Source	Rating
AllMusic	4/5 stars

Inventions for Electric Guitar is the debut solo studio album by guitarist and composer Manuel Göttsching. Initially, it was released with the subtitle Ash Ra Tempel VI, technically making it the sixth and final album under the Ash Ra Tempel name. This record marked a change of direction, inspired by Göttsching's foray into minimalism and technological experiments with his new studio equipment.

Mark Richardson of Pitchfork stated: "With Inventions, Göttsching announced himself as a master architect of intricate instrumental arrangement."

== Production ==
In 1974, Göttsching started to build his recording facility, Studio Roma, in Berlin. The name was derived from his and his wife's Rosi first names. Roma's equipment, at that point, consisted of a 1961 Gibson SG Special with Vibrola, a Lap steel guitar, a Sola Sound Fuzz, a Schaller Rotosound, a Wah-wah, a 4-track TEAC A-3340 and 2 Studer-Revox A77 tape machines. Inventions for Electric Guitar was the first album recorded at the studio.

The record was entirely written and performed by Göttsching on electric guitar. He took three to four months of "hard work" to finish writing for the album.

According to MG.ART, Göttsching's label, the master tape of Inventions was encoded with the Stereo Quadraphonic, 4-channel quadraphonic sound. A copy of this tape was used for the 2011 remastered vinyl and CD versions of the record. These rereleases could still play the quad sound with the appropriate decoder.

== Music ==
Mark Richardson of Pitchfork stated that the music on Inventions "straddled two worlds, with a mix of cosmic blues-inspired guitar soloing and precise Terry Riley-style minimalism."

On the album's back cover liner notes, Göttsching stated:

The incredible career of the electric guitar since the beginning of Rock n Roll times and my personal experiences on that instrument within the last six years gave me the possibility to lead the guitar to a new way of performance - electronic music.

Göttsching's music went through a profound shift when he discovered minimalist composers Terry Riley, Steve Reich and Philip Glass. Göttsching himself called Inventions a "minimalist experiment".

AllMusic reviewer Mark Richardson remarked that Inventions for Electric Guitar was reminiscent of fellow krautrockers Tangerine Dream's music from the same period, namely the Phaedra (1974) and Rubycon (1975) albums.

== Touring and promotion ==
Göttsching played various dates on the UK, France and Germany with friend Lutz Ulbrich, a.k.a. Lüül, on keyboards. Their 1975 tour featured (then) state-of-the-art equipment, such as the EMS Synthi Hi-Fli guitar synthesizer and the EKO ComputeRhythm drum machine. The duo's improvisations became the backbone of Ashra's New Age of Earth (1976) and the soundtrack of Philippe Garrel's Le Berceau de Cristal (1976). The French director was a close friend and a fan. Göttsching gave him a one-hour tape of his music without having seen a single scene of the movie.

On two of the French gigs, the new Ash Ra Tempel played alongside Cologne-based avant-rock group Can and Nico, of The Velvet Underground fame. Manuel spoke fondly of the experience. By the year's end, Lüül quit playing with Göttsching and joined forces with Nico.

== More Inventions for Electric Guitar ==
On the 2010 edition of Japan's Metamorphose, one of the country's biggest outdoor electronic music festivals, Inventions was played for the first time live with 4 guitarists. Beside Göttsching himself, the line-up included Steve Hillage, formerly of Gong and System 7, multi-instrumentalist Elliott Sharp and Zhang Shouwang of China's most prominent rock band, White. Dubbed the "More Inventions for Electric Guitar" show, the set featured the entire 1975 album plus portions of E2-E4, considered by critics his masterpiece.

== Track listing ==
All songs composed by Manuel Göttsching.

No.	Title	Length
1.	"Echo Waves"	17:45
2.	"Quasarsphere"	6:34
3.	"Pluralis"	21:36

== Personnel ==
Manuel Göttsching: Guitars
