= Walter Wegmüller =

Swiss artist (1937–2020)

Walter Wegmüller (25 February 1937 – 26 March 2020) was a Swiss painter and recording artist. As a recording artist, he was best known for the Krautrock album Tarot, which was released on the Cosmic Couriers label in 1973.

== Biography ==
Wegmüller was born in Bern, the son of Romani travellers, and grew up in homes and farms with foster parents. He traveled around Europe and India, making paintings and jewelry. He settled in Basel in 1957 and became an expert on the tarot.

Working as a visual artist, Wegmüller designed a set of 22 tarot cards. His friend Timothy Leary introduced him to Rolf-Ulrich Kaiser of Ohr Records in Germany, and it was agreed that Wegmüller record an album on the theme of tarot, with musicians Klaus Schulze, two members of Ash Ra Tempel, Manuel Göttsching and Hartmut Enke, and other musicians collectively known as The Cosmic Jokers. The album was recorded in 1972 and released in 1973, with an elaborate package that included a set of Wegmüller's cards. Wegmüller recites stories about each of the tarot cards on the album, which also contains lengthy instrumental passages.

After returning to Switzerland, Wegmüller continued working as a visual artist. Two tarot series: Das Zigeuner-Tarot ("The Gypsy Tarot'") and Das Neuzeit-Tarot ("The Modern Tarot"), published in the 1970s and 1980s, became popular. In 1990, he took part in the Symposium für Alchemie in St Gallen.
