= Starring Rosi =

Studio album by Ash Ra Tempel
- Released: 1973
- Recorded: Studio Dierks, Stommeln, Germany, 1973
- Genre: Krautrock
- Length: 34:52
- Label: Kosmische Musik
- Producer: Manuel Göttsching

Ash Ra Tempel chronology
Join Inn (1973)	Starring Rosi (1973)	Le Berceau de Cristal (soundtrack) (1993)

Professional ratings
Review scores
Source	Rating
Allmusic	3/5 stars

Starring Rosi is the fifth and technically final album released by Ash Ra Tempel, as it is the last to feature Manuel Göttsching. It was recorded at Studio Dierks, Stommeln by Dieter Dierks. It was originally released on LP by Ohr under their 'Kosmische Musik' imprint, catalogue number KM 58.007.

Generally regarded as something of a turning point for Göttsching, this album to some extent dispenses with the lengthy jams of previous albums and adopts a tighter song-structure. The line-up is a reduced one following the departure of Hartmut Enke; Göttsching plays most of the instruments, with Wallenstein's Harald Großkopf guesting on drums.

== Track listing ==
SIDE A:

1. "Laughter Loving" (Göttsching) – 8:00
2. "Day-Dream" (Göttsching, Müller) – 5:21
3. "Schizo" (Göttsching) – 2:47
4. "Cosmic Tango" (Göttsching, Müller) – 2:06

SIDE B:

1. "Interplay of Forces" (Göttsching, Müller) – 8:58
2. "The Fairy Dance" (Göttsching) – 3:07
3. "Bring Me Up" (Göttsching, Müller) – 4:33

== Personnel ==
- Manuel Göttsching – guitar, vocals, acoustic guitars, bass, electric piano, mellotron, synthesiser, congas
- Rosemarie Müller – voice and vocals, vibes, concert harp, lyrics (credited as 'Rosi')

Additional personnel

- Harald Großkopf – drums
- Dieter Dierks – bass on "Bring Me Up", chorus arrangement on "Day-Dream", engineer
- Heiner Friesz – assistant engineer
