= Witthüser & Westrupp =

German music group

- Also known as: The magic group
- Origin: Germany
- Genres: Psychedelic folk Krautrock
- Years active: 1970–1973
- Labels: Ohr, Pilz
- Members: Bernd Witthüser; Walter Westrupp
- Website: www.westrupp.de/w+w/w+w.htm

Witthüser & Westrupp was a German singer-songwriter duo from Essen. The guitarist Bernd Witthüser (1944-2017) and the multi-instrumentalist Walter Westrupp (* 1946) had their roots in the folk and protest song movement, and their joint titles initially had macabre, later predominantly psychedelic elements. The band was formed in June 1969 as "W&W's pop cabaret", singing German texts in a special way. In 1970 the name changed to "Witthüser & Westrupp". Their music was attributed to the genre of psychedelic folk and later to krautrock. Their best-known album became the 1971 concept album Der Jesuspilz, in which an undefined substance ("der Brösel") becomes a symbol of the divine. The duo existed from 1969 to 1973. Later, Bernd Witthüser lived in Murci (Italy) until his death, while he was working as the street musician Bärnelli in Europe. Walter Westrupp is still living in Germany and is the frontman of the skiffle and jug band Walter h.c. Meier Pumpe.

== Career ==
Bernd Witthüser, who as a "protest singer of the Ruhr" set to music and sang texts by the Essen journalist Thomas Rother, and the multi-instrumentalist Walter Westrupp, both from the Essen folk scene, met in 1967 in the Essen "City Club" and then worked together in the Essen artist basement pub "Podium". In 1968 Witthüser was involved as managing director of the Internationale Essener Songtage initiated by Rolf-Ulrich Kaiser, Tom Schroeder, Hendrik M. Broder, Reinhard Hippen and others, where he also performed himself. Afterwards he founded the "1st Essen Commune" together with Westrupp, they went through the city together as the first Essen hippies, invented the tea bag lifting machine TEHOMA and attracted attention with all kinds of nonsense actions.

In 1969 they started to make music together. Initially as Bernd Witthüser Sing- und Spielgemeinschaft (SuSG), then as W & Ws Pop-Cabaret and from 1970 as Duo Witthüser & Westrupp they performed together until 1973. They composed and recorded various LPs and singles during this time, and their titles appeared on countless collections and samplers. They were frequent guests on television and radio and performed at various festivals. With their "Trips-und-Träume" music, they gave the German stoners their own songs in the national language and thus landed in the indices of the radio stations, were voted 3rd place among the German-language singing duos by the German music journalists at the German Music Poll 1971 of the Schallplatte magazine, played in artists' cellars, singer-songwriter pubs, cabaret stages and performed at numerous festivals. They completed a tour of 100 German churches with their "Jesus Opera" as well as a tour of Germany together with the German hard rock band Wallenstein. They were involved as studio musicians in Walter Wegmüller's "Tarot" project as well as in the electronic improvisation project Lord Krishna by Goloka of the Swiss author and publicist Sergius Golowin, and as such collaborated on productions of musician friends and groups from the "Kaiser" cosmos. Parallel to their studio work, Witthüser & Westrupp were regularly on tour. They played in clubs and on cabaret stages (e.g. in the Mainzer Unterhaus). In Berlin they performed with Insterburg & Co, Reinhard Mey, Ulrich Roski, Schobert & Black and Hannes Wader. They played at various pop and blues festivals, including the Fehmarn Festival on September 6, 1970, where they performed in front of Jimi Hendrix. They made various television appearances, including with Insterburg & Co. and Franz Josef Degenhardt. The musicians were also heard on productions by Hoelderlin, Jerry Berkers and Bröselmaschine. In March 1973 Witthüser & Westrupp disbanded. Bernd Witthüser traveled to India, then went to Berlin and later to Italy, where he lived for a long time as a street singer. Walter Westrupp settled back in Essen and opened his arts and crafts store "Dabbelju". At the end of 1973 a live double LP with concert recordings from Freiburg and Koblenz was released. This last LP of the duo was mixed by Dieter Dierks and produced by Rolf-Ulrich Kaiser and Gille Lettmann. It included music from all four W&W programs as well as songs that had not been released on any of the previous LPs: a cross-section of the two musicians' entire creative period together. A DVD, reworked by Walter Westrupp in 2005 and released under the title Als wäre es gestern erst gewesen, shows the career of the two musicians based on old TV recordings, documentaries and pictures from 1968 to 2003 (including Otto & Bernelli and Walter h.c. Meier Pumpe) and the story of their invention (the tea bag lifting machine - TEHOMA). In 2018, a live recording of the dress rehearsal of the Jesuspilz opera from October 1971 was released by Sireena Records. The duo's history is described in detail in Walter Westrupp's multimedia online-book "68er nach Noten".

== Work ==
=== Lieder von Vampiren, Nonnen und Toten ===
The first LP Lieder von Vampiren, Nonnen und Toten (Songs of vampires, nuns and the dead) was recorded in Hamburg in March 1970 and dealt thematically with life, death and dying. It was released on the newly founded label Ohr by Rolf-Ulrich Kaiser. In addition to his own texts, poems by Heinrich Heine, Novalis, Thomas Rother and Baltus Brösel were set to music. The music was exclusively by Witthüser & Westrupp. Incorrectly, only Bernd Witthüser was named on the front cover. The instrumentation was varied, (Witthüser played Guitar, Westrupp played Ukulele, Trumpet and Trombone, Xylophon, Basedrum, Washboard, Flute and Chromonica) all this exclusively acoustic and - in contrast to the following LPs - sparse and simple. Their stage show at that time consisted of only one red and one green light - alternating for love and coffin songs. To present their LP, the two musicians had themselves carried on stage in style in coffins.

=== Trips & Träume ===
Trips und Träume (Trips & Dreams), W & W's second LP, was recorded in March 1971 in Stommeln in Dieter Dierks' studio. It was created with the help of the musicians Bernd Roland (Bass) and Renée Zucker (Voice and Piano). Producers were Rolf-Ulrich Kaiser and Gille Lettmann. The LP was also released on the Ohr label. The title was program: the album contains travelogues (among others Laßt uns auf die Reise gehen, a text by Thomas Rother) as well as Nimm einen Joint, mein Freund, which is one of the band's best-known songs. The instruments grew: Witthüser played electric guitar and mandolin, Westrupp added psalteries, bongos and f-flutes. Their live program of the same name was peppered with nonsense lyrics, Indian fairy tales, and stories of trips and hikes together through strange wondrous landscapes, and - just like the LP - was aimed at the "positively" freaked out.

=== Der Jesuspilz - Musik vom Evangelium ===
The third LP, the concept album Der Jesuspilz - Musik vom Evangelium ( The Jesus Mushroom - Music from the Gospel), was produced in August 1971 in the shadow of the Jesus People movement, but had other roots. The basis was the book Secret Cult of the Holy Mushroom by John Marco Allegro. The basic idea for this LP was to reinterpret the Bible. Thus, the "crumb" was declared the primordial essence of life and its story was told from creation to modern times. Jesus addresses his disciples as "guys". The Bible texts Genesis 1 (Creation), Luke 3:21-22; 6:13 (Enlightenment and Calling), Luke 9:12-17 (Gathering), Mark 4:26-32 (Confession) and Mark 16:15 (The Sending) were thereby musically transposed and retold by Witthüser & Westrupp. In addition to all of the aforementioned instruments, Witthüser used the banjo, kazoo and other guitars, and Westrupp played harmonium and a large number of percussion instruments. Some of the songs from the opera, such as Der Sündenfall, Auferstehung und Himmelfahrt and Vision 1 did not make it onto the LP and were - except for Vision 1 (Bauer Plath) and Der Sündenfall (as Der Teufel in Walter Wegmüller's Tarot production) - never released. They were recorded again at Studio Dierks in Stommeln, with Dieter Dierks (mellotron) as musician and producer. Other producers were Rolf-Ulrich Kaiser and Gille Lettmann. The album was released on Ohr's subsidiary label, Pilz, also founded by Rolf-Ulrich Kaiser. The premiere of the "Jesus Opera" took place in the Apostel Church in Essen. The media response was great, so that the duo performed in over a hundred churches in the Federal Republic as well as in many television broadcasts.

=== Bauer Plath ===
After W & W had toured all over Germany with their music from the Gospel, they retired to the seclusion of the small village of Dill in Hunsrück. This is where the fourth LP Bauer Plath (Farmer Plath) came into being. It was dedicated to their landlord and bears his name. The lyrics were based on German and Indian fairy tales and the books of J. R. R. Tolkien and Carlos Castaneda, the music came exclusively from Witthüser & Westrupp. The LP was recorded in June/July 1972 at Studio Dierks in Stommeln. The LP was again produced by Rolf-Ulrich Kaiser and Gille Lettmann. Guest musicians were Jürgen Dollase, Jerry Berkers, Harald Grosskopf, Bill Baron (all from the rock group Wallenstein), Tommy Engel (bläck fööss), Gille Lettmann, Antje Dahlhaus (both singing) and Dieter Dierks. Bauer Plath also appeared on the Pilz label.

=== Live 68-73 ===
In 1973 the double LP "Live 68-73" was released with concert recordings from Freiburg and Koblenz. Without much technical support, music pieces from all four W&W programs were recorded live by Dieter Dierks with a recording mobile - quasi a cross-section through the entire joint creative period. By the time the production was released, the musicians had already parted ways: the LPs were released as an obituary, so to speak. In 2018, a live recording of the dress rehearsal of "Der Jesuspilz" was released by Sireena Records.

== Discography ==
- Lieder von Vampiren, Nonnen und Toten (1970) (listed as a Berndt Witthüser solo album, although both Witthüser and Westrupp play) LP, OHR OMM 56.002
- 1970 – Einst kommt die Nacht/Wer schwimmt dort (W&W), Single, OHR OS 57 002
- 1970 – OHRENSCHMAUS (mit W&W ), Sampler, Do-LP, OMM 2/56.006
- 1971 – Trips und Träume (W&W), LP, OHR OMM 556 016
- 1971 – Nimm einen Joint, mein Freund/Lasst uns auf die Reise gehen (W&W), Single, OHR 57004
- 1971 – Mitten ins Ohr (mit W&W), Sampler, Do-LP, OHR OMM 2/56018
- 1971 – Der Jesuspilz (W&W), LP, Pilz 2021098-7
- 1971 – Die Erleuchtung/die Aussendung (W&W), Single, PILZ 05 19041-7
- 1971 – Magical Land/Crazy Inspiration (W&W als „The Magic Group“), Single, BASF 05-15012-1
- 1972 – Bauer Plath (W&W), LP, PILZ 20 29115-4
- 1972 – Bauer Plath/Lied der Liebe (W&W), Single, PILZ 05 19 134-0
- 1972 – Unterwegs - Jerry Berkers (Mitwirkung W) LP, PILZ 20 29131-6
- 1972 - Rapunzel (Mitwirkung W&W) Sampler, LP, PILZ 2029116-2
- 1972 – Hölderlins Traum (Mitwirkung W), LP, PILZ 20 21314-5
- 1973 - Lord Krishna von Goloka - Sergius Golowin (Mitwirkung W), LP, Kosmische Kuriere KK 58002
- 1973 – TAROT von Walter Wegmüller (Mitwirkung W), Do-LP, Kosmische Kuriere KK 2/58.003
- 1973 – Live 68-73 (W&W), Do–LP, Kosmische Musik KM 2/58.004
- 1974 – Deutsche Liedermacher – Songfestival Ingelheim, Live-Mitschnitt (Mitwirkung BaierWestrupP), LP, Songbird/EMI Electrola 1 C 148-31 124/25
- 1980 – Witthüser & Westrupp – ZXY Box 1 (W&W), 3 LPs, ZYX-BOX 1
- 1995 – Die Witthüser & Westrupp CD-Collection (W&W), CD, ZYX MUSIC, ZYX CD 80.026
- 2000 – Krautrockzeit (mit W&W), Sampler, 2 CDs, ZYX 81282-2
- 2004 – Macht das Ohr nochmal auf... (mit W&W), CD, ZYX, OHR 70050-2
- 2004 - ...als wäre es gestern erst gewesen (W&W), DVD, Eigenregie u. -vertrieb, WWDVD1
- 2008 – Krautrock – music for your brain (mit W&W), div. CDs, Target Music 06024 9831762
- 2018 – Der Jesuspilz Live (W&W), LP, Sireena Records, SIR 4045
- 2020 – Innovative Jahre des Krautrock (mit W&W) 4 Do-CDs, Verlag Bear Family, BCD17622 [361141]
- 2020 – Experimental German Rock 71-83 (mit W&W), 3 LPs, Soul Jazz Records SJR LP459
- 2021 – KRAUTROCK 2 – (mit W), 2 DVD, Romantic Warriors USA, progdocs.com

== Literature ==
- Julian Scope: Krautrock Sampler (1996 Werner Piper, ISBN 3925817867) W&W S. 155 f.
- Folk & Liedermacher an Rhein und Ruhr. Robert v. Zahn (Hrsg.), Agende Verlag 2003, ISBN 3-89688-125-6, S. 129–152, mit W&W u. WhcMP
- Detlev Mahner u. Klaus Stürmer: Zappa, Zoff und Zwischentöne - Klartext Verlag, Essen, 2008,ISBN 978-3-89861-936-3.) S. 281 ff
- Christoph Wagner: Der Klang der Revolte,2013, Schott Music, ISBN 978-3-7957-0842-9, Register W&W
- Walter Wandtke: Aufgewachsen in Essen in den 60er und 70er Jahren, Wartberg Verlag 2013, ISBN 978-3-8313-1862-9) mit W&W
- German Rock e.V. : Die W&W-Story (Rock News 35/2007)
- Frank Baier, Jochen Wiegandt (Hrsg.): Glück auf – Liederbuch Ruhr. Lieder und Lexikon 2013, Klartext Verlag, ISBN 978-3-8375-0645-7, S. 429, 435, 440, 441
