= Bernd Noske =

German drummer and singer (1946–2014)

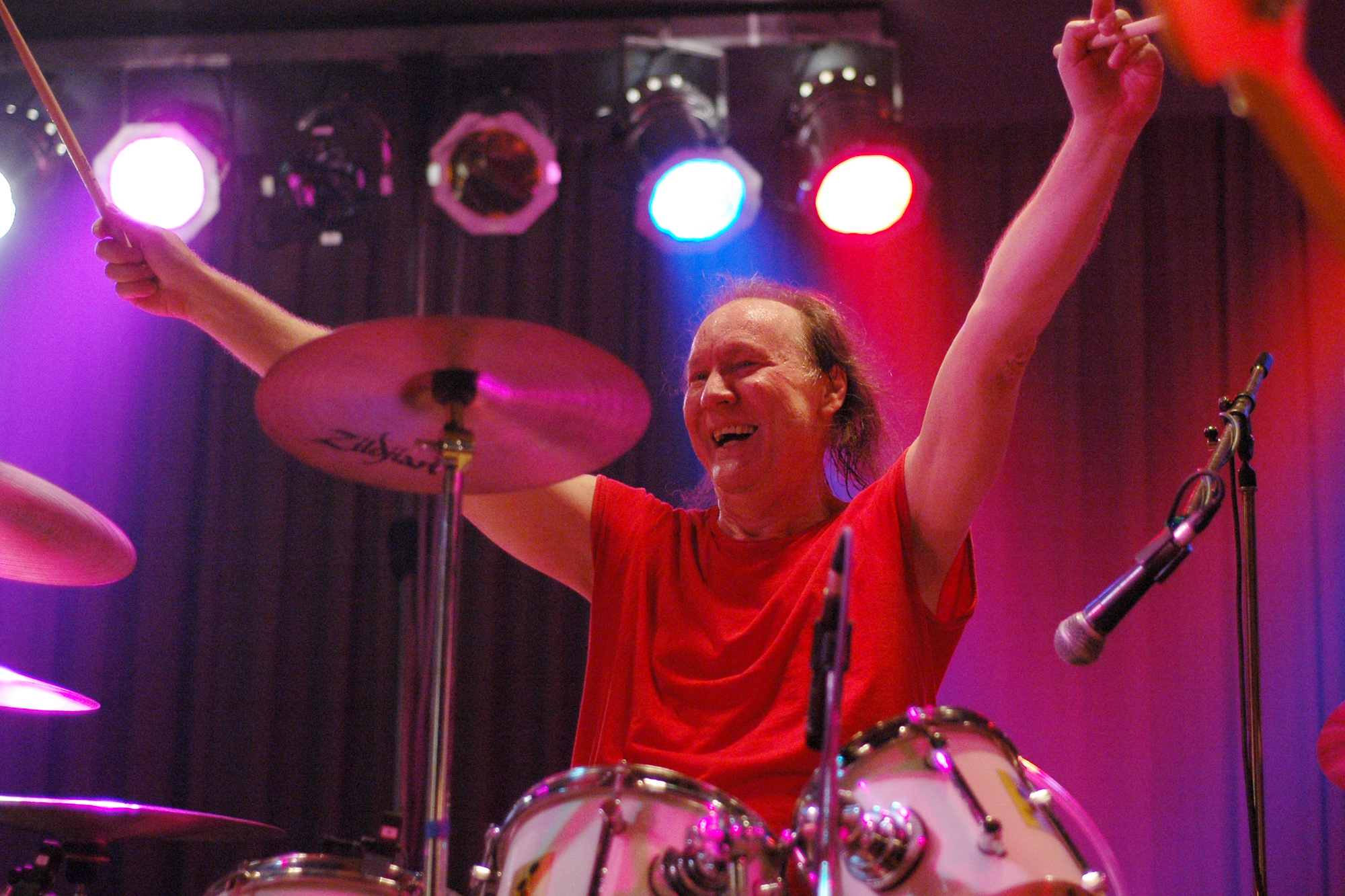
Noske in 2006

Bernd "Nossi" Noske (17 August 1946 – 18 February 2014) was a German musician. He is best known as the singer and drummer of the progressive rock band Birth Control.

In 1999, he released a solo album, Come Out at Night.

== Life ==
At the age of nine Noske sang in the school choir and played drums in the school theatre. After school he worked as a packer and truck driver until he started his career as a musician.

His first band "The Odd Persons" gave concerts in West Germany and performed at the Hamburg Starclub. In 1969, as successor of Hugo Egon Balder, he joined the band Birth Control, with whom he performed as a constant member and frontman until 2014. When songwriter and musician Bruno Frenzel died in 1983, in late effects by an electric shock he received on stage during a common gig in 1975, Noske dissolved the band and played with Hardbeats, Mr. Goodtrip and Lilly & the Rockets. In 1993 the band reformed and was active again. In 1999 Noske released the solo album Come out at Night, which he had already recorded in 1978/79.

== Instruments and playing style ==
In the early days of Birth Control Bernd Noske (nicknamed Nossi) played a Ludwig drum set consisting of bass drum, hanging tom, stand tom, snare, hi-hat and two cymbals, which he later added another hanging tom and another cymbal.

Birth Control had international success with the piece Gamma Ray. This was essentially characterised by drum passages that Noske played on timbales using maracas. With the new formation he played these passages alternately on timbales or tomtoms. The fact that he played live as a drummer and lead singer at the same time was also extraordinary.

Finally Bernd Noske played a sonor drum set consisting of bass drum, two rock toms, two hanging toms, two stand toms, snare, hi-hat and five cymbals. During his solo he stood up while playing and climbed onto the bass drum from the front to continue drumming from this position.
