= Al Berkowitz =

Spanish-English rock band

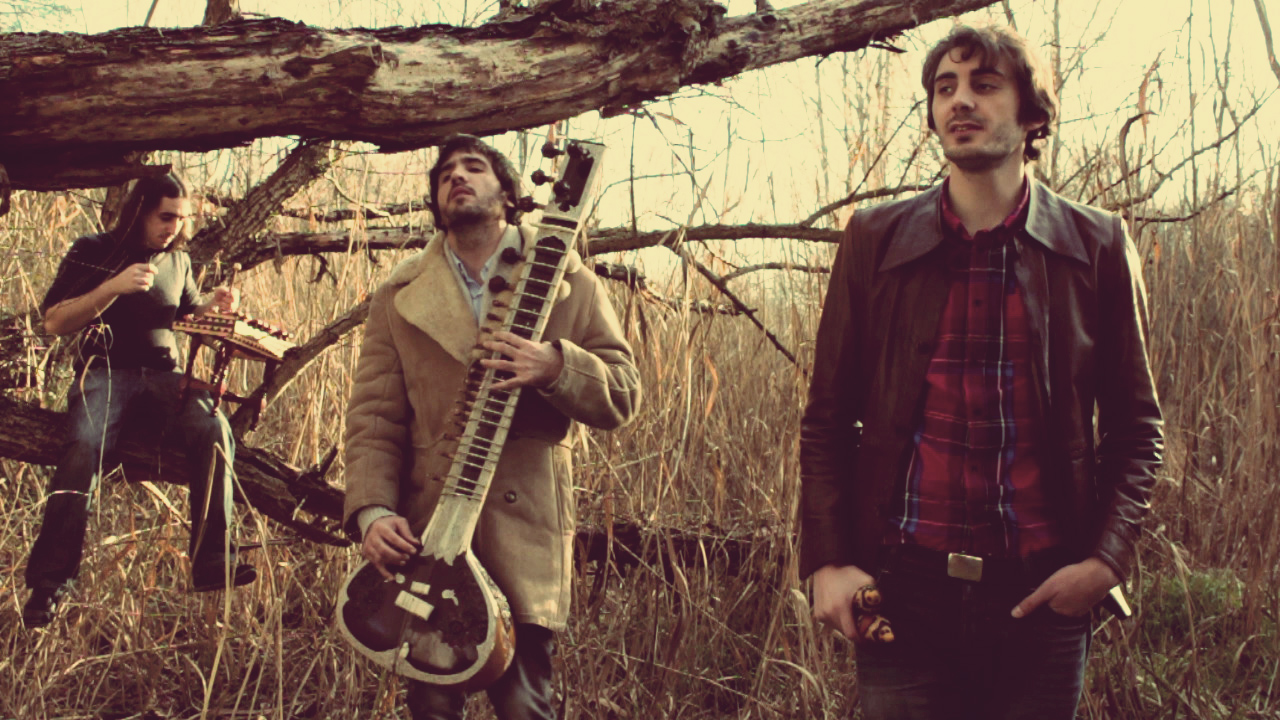

Background information
- Origin: Madrid
- Genres: Psychedelic rock, art rock, space rock, experimental rock
- Years active: 2006–present
- Labels: Tempel Arts, Green Ufos
- Spinoff of: The Inhabitants
- Members: Ignacio Simón; Lorenzo Palomares; Santiago Estrada
- Past members: Aldous Berkowitz, Daniel Garabito
- Website: http://www.alberkowitz.com

Al Berkowitz is an art rock/psychedelic rock band based in London. The band was founded in Madrid, Spain, in 2006 by Ignacio Simón, Lorenzo Palomares, Santiago Estrada and American musician and beatnick Aldous Berkowitz, with vocalist, guitarist and principal songwriter Simón being the only constant member. They have released two studio albums to date. Their last album A Long Hereafter / Nothing Beyond has received critical acclaim in Spain and has found a positive reception in other European countries as Austria and United Kingdom.

== Biography ==
=== Early career ===
Al Berkowitz was founded from blues rock/space rock band The Inhabitants. The Inhabitants consisted of Simón (guitar and lead vocals), Estrada (bass guitar), Palomares (drums) and Daniel Garabito (guitar and vocals). The band started performing steadily around Madrid in 2005 and became a scarcely known underground act in the city. In June 2006 The Inhabitants crossed their paths with American musician Aldous B. Berkowitz (born 1949) and asked him to join the band. With the addition of Aldous B. Berkowitz (vocals and harmonica), the band renamed Al Berkowitz Band and moved briefly to Berlin, where they recorded an EP, Man in the air, and worked on the songs for their first album Barely Nice.

=== Barely Nice and Apprenticeship and Attitude ===
Live performances with Aldous Berkowitz as a frontman eventually became erratic and chaotic and the rest of the band decided he would step aside from it and stay just as a mere advisor and exceptional contributor. Garabito would also leave the band shortly afterwards. However, the band retained the name Al Berkowitz Band and relocated again in Madrid in September 2007.

Barely Nice was recorded in Gandía, Spain, in November 2007 but was not released until March 2009 by independent Spanish label Producciones Psicotrónicas and the band's own label Temple Records. Barely nice had a short print of 2,000 copies and made a moderate impact in Spanish music scene.

The same year, Al Berkowitz Band released a live album, Apprenticeship and Attitude, which featured songs included in Barely Nice and in their forthcoming album A Long Hereafter / Nothing Beyond. Besides, Apprenticehip and Attitude included covers of "Light: look at your sun", by krautrock champions Ash Ra Tempel, and "Movoco Synthaca", by Belgian new wavers Nacht Und Nebel (band).

=== A Long Hereafter / Nothing Beyond ===
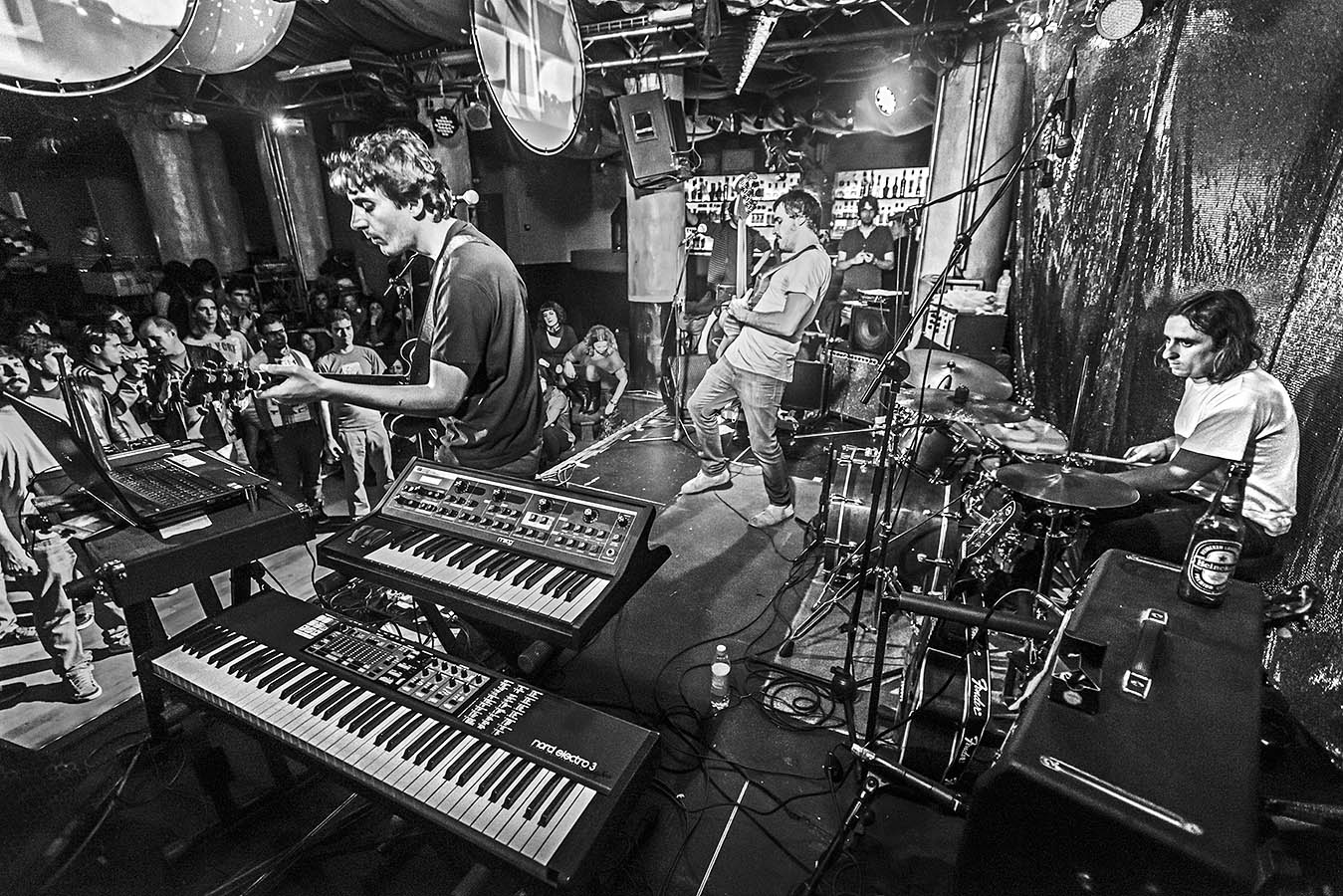
Al Berkowitz live

Al Berkowitz Band started working on their second studio effort in July 2010. Around that time, Aldous Berkowitz was not collaborating with the band anymore and they dropped the word '"Band" from their name.

A Long hereafter / Nothing beyond' was produced by Al Berkowitz's frontman Ignacio Simón and its main core was recorded at Paco Loco studio in El Puerto de Santa María, Spain in November 2011.

"The Frenchman and the Rabbitman" was the first single from the album and was released in March 2012 along with a videoclip. The band kept working on the album until September 2012 and then signed to Spanish independent label Green Ufos to release the album in 2013.

A revised version of A Long Hereafter / Nothing Beyond was reissued in 2015 on their own label Tempel Arts.

== Discography ==
=== Albums ===
- Barely Nice (as Al Berkowitz Band)
  - Recorded: November–December 2007
  - Released: March 2009
  - Label: Producciones Psicotrónicas / Temple Records
- A Long Hereafter / Nothing beyond
  - Released: January 2013
  - Reissued: April 2015
  - Label: Tempel Arts / Green Ufos

=== Live albums ===
- Apprenticeship and Attitude (as Al Berkowitz Band) - Producciones Psicotrónicas (December 2009)
- Two Delighful Evenings with Al Berkowitz - Tempel Arts (December 2014)

=== EPs ===
- Man in the Air (as Al Berkowitz Band) - Temple Records (October 2006) (limited edition 300 copies)
- Football, Women and Knives - Temple Records (April 2009)
- A Better Way - Tempel Arts (March 2013)
