= Bettina Hohls =

German artist and designer (born 1947)

Bettina Hohls (born 26 June 1947, in Celle) is a German artist and designer. She raised the attention of an international audience with her design and photographic work for the covers of two Peter Hammill albums in 1973 and 1974 as well as with her vocal contributions to releases of the German rock band Ash Ra Tempel in 1972.

Bettina Hohls lives in Berlin and works as a certified cultural manager.

== Education and career ==
Bettina Hohls attended the Hölty-Gymnasium in Celle until 1963.

In 1969 Bettina Hohls graduated as Designer at the Werkkunstschule in Hannover (today Fachhochschule Hannover) and attended Hochschule der Künste in Berlin (today Berlin University of the Arts) until 1975.

Hohls was associated with the German psychedelic rock group Ash Ra Tempel, contributing vocals to their 1972 album Seven Up (with Timothy Leary) and the single "Gedanken".

She designed the cover of The Silent Corner and the Empty Stage, a 1974 album by the British singer and songwriter Peter Hammill and took the photograph "Hamburg foliage" on the cover of Hammill's 1973 album Chameleon in the Shadow of the Night.

In the 1980s and 1990s Bettina Hohls worked as a teacher for arts and took part in various exhibitions and art symposiums in Germany as well as in Korea and Japan. She assisted Peter Gabriel in preparing the first WOMAD festival in 1982.

She is engaged in intercultural studies, works as an artist agent and, on a small scale level, as a concert manager.

== Personal life ==
Bettina Hohls has a daughter and has lived in Berlin since 1969. She is very interested in intercultural communications, especially in Asian culture. She is member of the Deutsch-Japanische Gesellschaft where she takes part in cultural events.

Bettina Hohls is a multiple synesthete.
