= E2-E4 =

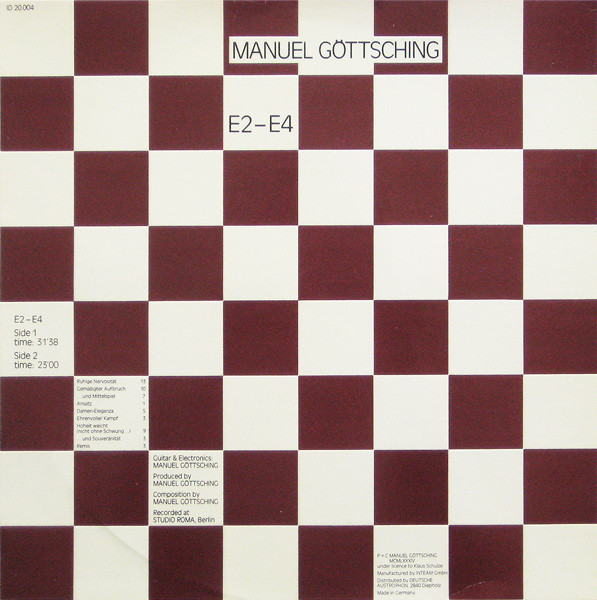

Studio album by Manuel Göttsching
- Released: 1984
- Recorded: December 12, 1981
- Genres: Electronic; kosmische musik; minimalism
- Length: 58:39
- Labels: Inteam, MG-Art (2001 reissue)
- Producer: Manuel Göttsching

Manuel Göttsching chronology
Inventions for Electric Guitar (1975)	E2-E4 (1984)	Dream and Desire (1991)

Professional ratings
Review scores
Source	Rating
AllMusic	5/5 stars
Pitchfork Media	9.2/10

E2-E4 is the second solo studio album by German musician Manuel Göttsching, recorded in 1981 and released in 1984 under Klaus Schulze's label Inteam. The album is named after the most popular opening chess move 1. e2-e4, which is expressed in long algebraic notation.

== Music ==
E2-E4 consists of one minimalistic, hour-long electronic track that Göttsching recorded in one take on December 12, 1981 using an ARP Odyssey through an ARP Sequencer, with freely improvised vamping on the keyboards, metallic electronic percussion, and guitar performances. As is common within the electronic music genre, the album's instrumentation is repetitious, with individual parts interplaying with one another.

== Reception ==
Writing for AllMusic, John Bush graded the album five stars on a five star scale, saying: "Simply put, it just sounds like the mainstream house produced during the next two decades. [...] What sets it apart from music that came before is a steadfast refusal to follow the popular notions of development in melody and harmony. Instead, E2-E4 continues working through similar territory for close to an hour with an application to trance-state electronics missing from most of the music that preceded it." He also added that the album "has earned its place as one of the most important, influential electronic records ever released."

Pitchfork and The Guardian named the album one of the best of the 1980s for its important role in the development of house and techno music of the late 1980s and early 1990s.

== Legacy ==
Göttsching expressed surprise and admiration learning in the subsequent years of the release of E2-E4 that it had been played by Latin club and house DJs and compared to minimal music composers such as Steve Reich. The piece was especially frequently rotated at New York's Paradise Garage dance club. Sueño Latino sampled E2-E4 on its 1989 song "Sueño Latino." It has been regarded as an influence on the genre of ambient techno, with the music of Carl Craig (who remixed E2-E4 as Paperclip People), Aphex Twin, the Black Dog and The Orb being invoked in music criticism in relation to the album. Dub techno duo Basic Channel also released a "Basic Reshape" remix of Paperclip People's E2-E4 "Remake", which was included on their compilation album BCD under the name "e2e4 Basic Reshape".

== Track sections ==
Original vinyl presses of the album gave the following titles and approximate times on the cover. Original presses (and various reissues) sectioned the album into two halves, giving Side 1 and 2 durations of 31:38 and 23:00 respectively. Later digital editions simply have one track with a 58:39 running time.

Side one
No.	Title	Length
1.	"Ruhige Nervosität"	13:00
2.	"Gemäßigter Aufbruch"	10:00
3.	"...Und Mittelspiel"	7:00
4.	"Ansatz"	1:00

Side two
No.	Title	Length
1.	"Damen-Eleganza"	5:00
2.	"Ehrenvoller Kampf"	3:00
3.	"Hoheit Weicht (Nicht Ohne Schwung...)"	9:00
4.	"...Und Souveränität"	3:00
5.	"Remis"	3:00

== Personnel ==
- Manuel Göttsching - ARP Odyssey, ARP Sequencer, AKG BX-5, Dynacord DRS-78, EKO Computerhythm, EMS Synthi A, Moog Minimoog, Pearl Syncussion and Sequential Circuits Prophet-10
