= Hartmut Enke =

German musician

Hartmut Enke (20 October 1952 – 27 December 2005) was a German musician who served as the bass guitarist in Ash Ra Tempel from 1971 to 1973.

Hartmut Enke formed his first band with Manuel Göttsching at his 15th birthday party in 1967. Three years later he was a member of Göttsching's Steeple Chase Bluesband which would evolve into Ash Ra Tempel. With his Ash Ra Tempel bandmates, he was also in the German band Eruption.

Enke decided to quit the music business in 1973, and was not present at Ash Ra Tempel's reunion in 2000. He died in late 2005, aged 53.

== Discography ==
- Ash Ra Tempel – Ash Ra Tempel – 1971
- Kosmische Musik – compilation including exclusive Ash Ra Tempel track "Gendanken" – 1972
- Schwingungen – Ash Ra Tempel – 1972
- Seven Up – Ash Ra Tempel with Timothy Leary – 1973
- Join Inn – Ash Ra Tempel – 1973
- Tarot – Walter Wegmüller – 1973
- Sci-Fi Party – Cosmic Jokers – 1974
