= Markgrafentheater Erlangen =

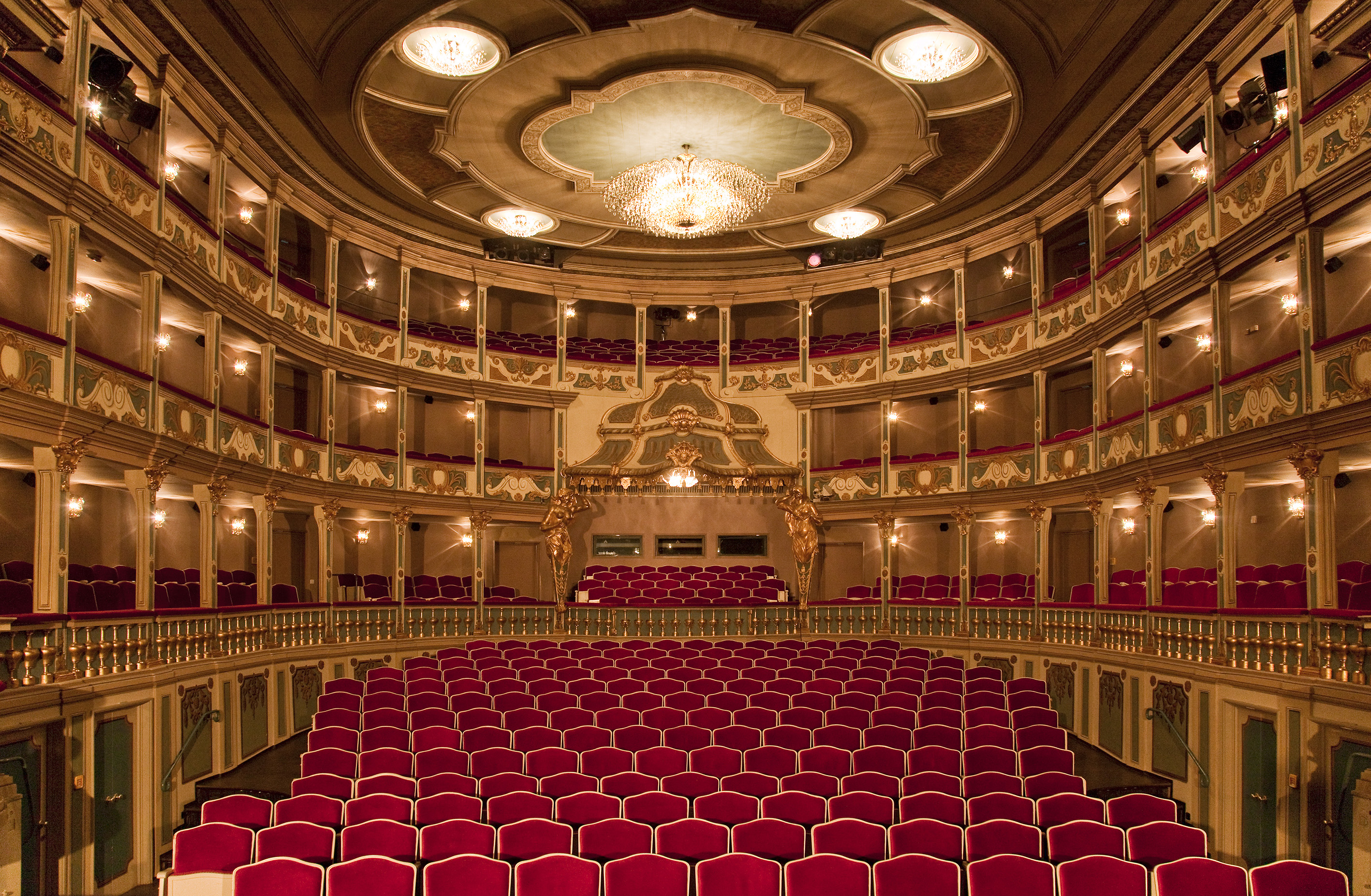
An image of Markgrafentheater Erlangen

Markgrafentheater Erlangen is a theater in Erlangen, Bavaria, Germany. It was opened in 1719, and celebrated its 300-year anniversary in 2019.
