= Rolf-Ulrich Kaiser =

German writer and record producer (born 1943)

Rolf-Ulrich Kaiser (born 18 June 1943) is a German writer and record producer. He is best known as the founder of the Ohr, Pilz, and Cosmic Couriers record labels. These labels released many of the earliest Krautrock albums in the early 1970s, and Kaiser is often cited as a pivotal figure in the development of the genre.

== Biography ==
Kaiser was born in Buckow, Brandenburg. His early interest focused on folk music, and he joined the staff of the magazine song. In 1967 he published a book on the international folk scene featuring interviews with Pete Seeger, Joan Baez and others. He was the chief organiser of the Internationale Essener Songtage in September 1968 which showcased bands and musicians such as Amon Düül, Floh de Cologne, Guru Guru, Tangerine Dream, Franz Josef Degenhardt, The Fugs, Peter Brötzmann, Julie Felix, Julie Driscoll and Brian Auger and, for the first time in Germany, Frank Zappa. Kaiser published numerous books on rock music between 1968 and 1972 for the German market.

In 1969 Kaiser founded the Ohr ('Ear') record label, dedicated to the underground German rock scene, which became one of the most important labels for Krautrock and German progressive rock. Ohr released albums by Floh de Cologne, Tangerine Dream, Ash Ra Tempel, Klaus Schulze, Guru Guru, Amon Düül, Embryo, Witthüser & Westrupp, Birth Control, Hoelderlin and others. Due to his success, in 1971 BASF offered to fund another record label by Kaiser, which was named Pilz ('Mushroom'). Pilz released more 'cosmic folk' material by Popol Vuh, Grinder, Wallenstein and Witthüser & Westrupp.

In 1972 Kaiser and his girlfriend Gerlinde "Gille" Lettmann visited Timothy Leary in his Swiss exile, and under his influence became enthusiastic proponents of LSD use. On one visit to Switzerland Leary recorded with members of Ash Ra Tempel, later released as the album Seven Up on Kaiser's third record label Kosmische Kuriere ('Cosmic Couriers') – a name inspired by Leary's view of himself as a cosmic messenger for the benefits of LSD. Partly as a result of Kaiser's increasing LSD experiments, A&R men Bruno Wendel and Günter Körber left Ohr in 1972 and founded Brain Records, soon signing many former Ohr artists.

Kaiser continued to issue albums by Walter Wegmüller and Sergius Golowin, but got into trouble when he started releasing albums under the name of The Cosmic Jokers, a supergroup made up of artists who did not even realise they were participating in such a project: Kaiser had taken recordings of informal jams by various artists from the label and had released them under the Cosmic Jokers name without their knowledge. The musicians affected – and in particular Klaus Schulze – were far from impressed with Kaiser's release of this material and took legal action. Wallenstein accused him of unpaid royalties, while Tangerine Dream and Hoelderlin were wary of his affinity for Leary. As a result of this and negative press attention, Kaiser's contracts with his bands were voided by the German courts, thus spelling the end for the Cosmic Couriers label. The last album he had released was Einsjäger und Siebenjäger by Popol Vuh in 1974.

Kaiser and Lettmann immediately retired completely from the public eye. During the 1980s the label ZYX Music reissued many of these titles on CD, using direct contracts with the artists. Kaiser made some attempts to claim a share of the royalties from these reissues but this was quickly dismissed. Because of the continuing appeal of the albums he released, Kaiser and Lettmann have regularly been the subject of journalistic investigations to trace their subsequent activities, all with very little success.
