= Harald Grosskopf =

German musician (born 1949)

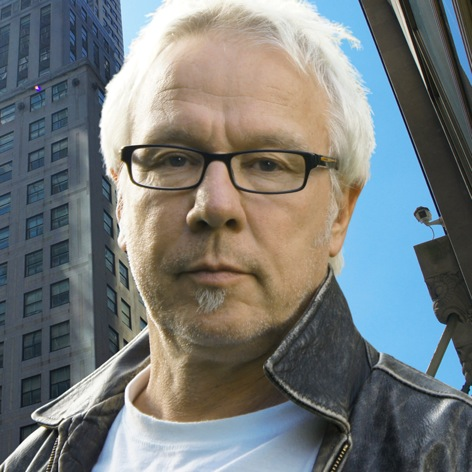

Background information
- Born: October 23, 1949 (age 76); Hildesheim, West Germany
- Genres: Krautrock; progressive rock; kosmische; electronic
- Instruments: Drums, keyboards
- Website: www.haraldgrosskopf.de

Harald Grosskopf (born Harald Großkopf) is a German electronic musician. He played with several Krautrock and progressive rock bands of the 1970s in Germany, and released solo music.

== Biography ==
Grosskopf was born in Hildesheim on October 23, 1949. He started his career in the 1960s as a drummer in the beat group The Stuntmen, and toward the end of the decade played in a then-unknown Scorpions. He later played drums in Wallenstein and Ashra, as well as for many of Klaus Schulze's solo albums. In 1980, he issued his debut LP, Synthesist, which became a cult classic of German electronic music. New York’s RVNG international label reissued the album, with remakes by James Ferraro, Oneohtrix and others in February 2011. In 1980 Grosskopf co-founded the Neue Deutsche Welle band Lilli Berlin, and he remained their drummer until 1983.

== Discography ==
=== Solo albums ===
Year	Album title	Label
1980	Synthesist	Sky Records
1986	Oceanheart	Sky Records
1992	World of Quetzal	4U Records
2002	Digital Nomad	AMP Records
2004	Yeti Society	Groove Unlimited
2010	Synthesist 2010	MellowJet Records
2011	Re-Synthesist	Rvng Intl.
2016	Naherholung	Little Marvin

=== with Ash Ra Tempel ===
- Starring Rosi (1973)

=== with Ashra ===
- Correlations (1979)
- Tropical Heat (1991)
- @shra (1998)
- Sauce Hollandaise (1998)
- @shra Vol.2 (2002)

=== with Baltes, Grosskopf, Heilhecker ===
- Viermaldrei (2001)

=== with Bernd Kistenmacher ===
- Characters (1991)
- Stadtgarten Live (1995)

=== with Cosmic Jokers ===
- Cosmic Jokers (1973)
- Galactic Supermarket (1974)

=== with Fishmoon ===
- Twomoon Music (2007)

=== with Joachim Witt ===
- Silberblick (1980)

=== with Klaus Schulze ===
- Moondawn (1976)
- Body Love (1977)
- Body Love Vol.2 (1977)
- X (1978)
- Live (1980)

=== with Kosmische Kuriere ===
- Sci Fi Party (1974)
- Planeten Sit-In (1974)

=== with Lilli Berlin ===
- Lilli Berlin (1981)
- Süß und Erbarmungslos (1982)
- Huh huh (1983)

=== with Mario Schönwälder ===
- Hypnotic Beats (1992)

=== with N-Tribe ===
- Tower of Power (1998)

=== with Steve Baltes ===
- Pictures in Rhythm (1995)
- Rhythm of Life (1998)

=== with Sunya Beat ===
- Sunya Beat (1998)
- Delhi Slide (1999)
- Comin’ Soon (2006)

=== with Wallenstein ===
- Blitzkrieg (recorded in 1971, released in 1972)
- Mother Universe (1972)
- Cosmic Century (1973)
- Storys, Songs & Symphonies (1975)

=== with Walter Wegmüller ===
- Tarot (1973)

=== with Witthüser & Westrupp ===
- Bauer Plath (1972)

=== with 17 Hippies ===
- Wer ist das? (1999)
- 17 Hippies play Guitar (2006)
- Biester (2014)
- Anatomy (2016)

== Videography ==
- Romantic Warriors IV: Krautrock (2019)
