= Birth Control (band) =

German rock band

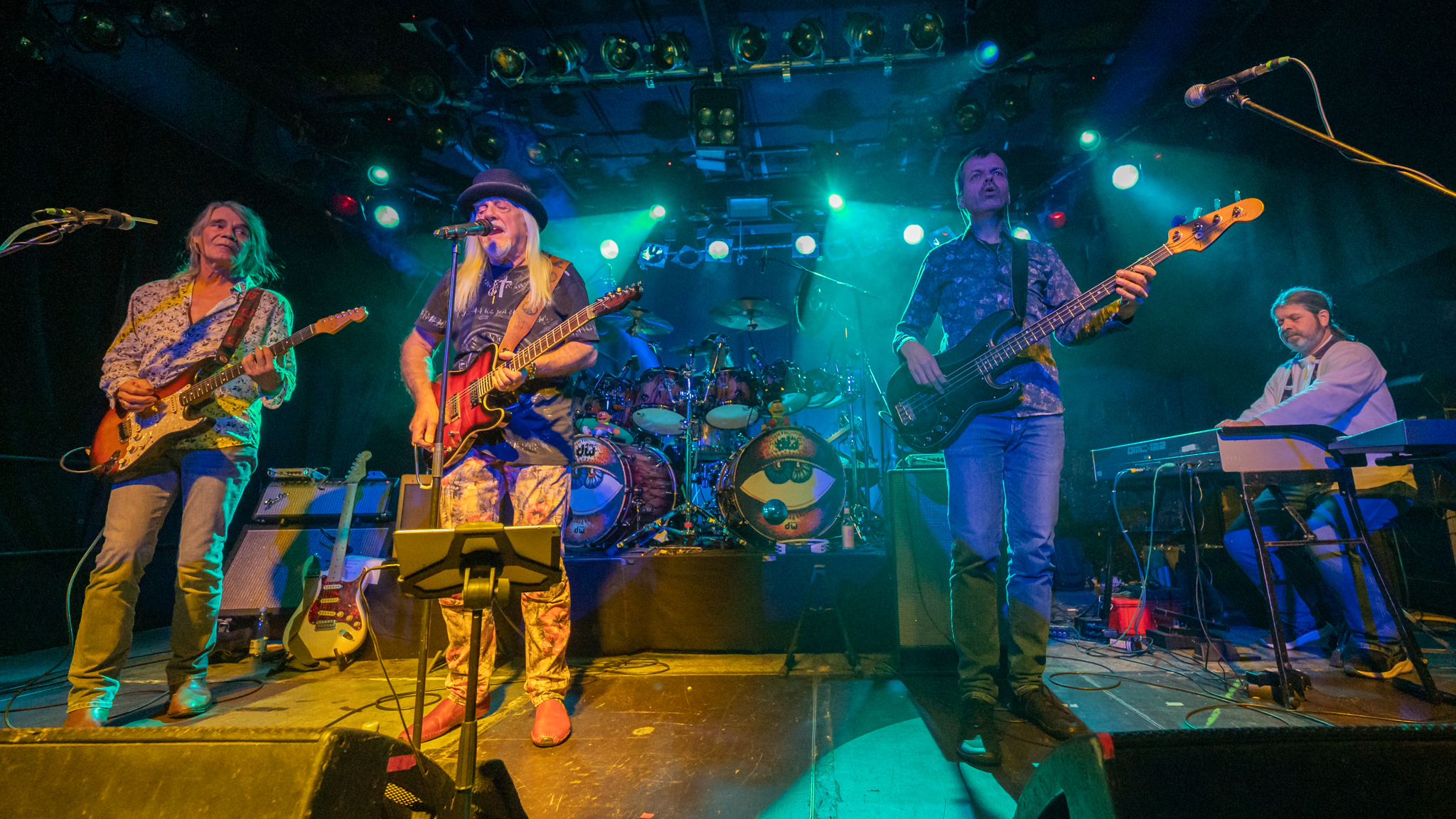
- Birth Control 2024

Background information
- Origin: West Berlin, West Germany
- Genres: Krautrock, hard rock, progressive rock
- Years active: 1966–1984, 1993–2014, 2016–present
- Labels: Ohr, Brain
- Members: Peter Föller (vocals); Martin Ettrich (guitar, talkbox); Sascha Kühn (keyboards); Hannes Vesper (bass); Manni von Bohr (drums)
- Past members: See "Members"
- Website: Official website

Birth Control is a German rock band known for their progressive hard rock sound.

== History ==
Birth Control formed in 1966 in West Berlin from two other bands, the Earls and the Gents. The band was founded with a lineup consisting of Bernd Koschmidder (bass), Reinhold Sobotta (organ), Rolf Gurra (saxophone, vocals), Fritz Gröger (vocals), Reiner Borchert (guitar), Hugo Egon Balder (drums), and Klaus Orso (guitar). Within five years of the band's formation all seven of the original members had departed, but the band continued under the leadership of long-standing members drummer (and later lead vocalist) Bernd Noske (who replaced Balder in late 1968) and guitarist Bruno Frenzel (who replaced Borchert in 1969).

Following the death of Frenzel in 1983, the group disbanded, but reunited in 1993 with only Noske remaining from the previous lineup. Other members of the reformed band included returning bassist/vocalist Horst Stachelhaus, as well as guitarist Rocco Zodiak and keyboardist Xaver Fischer.

Despite the death of mainstay Stachelhaus in 1999, the band continued under Noske's guidance, touring Germany and release new albums periodically following the turn of the century. In later years, former members Peter Föller (bass, vocals) and Zeus B. Held (keyboards) both returned to the fold as guest musicians at occasional concerts. The band came to an end on February 18, 2014 with the death of Noske. The final lineup of the band consisted of Noske, bassist Hannes Vesper, keyboardist Sascha Kuhn, and guitarist Martin Ettrich.

In 2016 the band regrouped and started performing again. The new lineup consisted of several members who at some point were part of the band's history: Peter Föller (vocals), Martin Ettrich (guitar, talkbox), Sascha Kühn (keyboards), Hannes Vesper (bass) and Manni von Bohr (drums). In the same year they released a new studio album ("Here and Now") for the first time in 13 years.

== Members ==
=== Current members ===
- Peter Föller – bass, vocals (1973–1977, 2016–present)
- Manfred von Bohr – drums (1977–1980, 2016–present)
- Hannes Vesper – bass, organ (1999–2000, 2002–present)
- Sascha Kuhn – keyboards (1999–present)
- Martin Ettrich – guitar, talk box (2011–present)

=== Past members ===
- Bernd Koschmidder – bass, vocals (1968–1973)
- Reinhold Sobotta – organ (1968–1972)
- Rolf Gurra – saxophone, vocals (1968–1969)
- Fritz Gröger – vocals (1968–1969)
- Reiner Borchert – guitar (1968–1969)
- Hugo Egon Balder – drums (1968)
- Klaus Orso – guitar (1968)
- Gerd Alsheimer – guitar (1968)
- Bernd Noske – drums, percussion, vocals (1968–1983, 1993–2014; died 2014)
- Bruno Frenzel – guitar (1969–1983; died 1983)
- Hartmut Schölgens - organ (1972)
- Wolfgang Neuser – organ (1972–1973; died 2018)
- Zeus B. Held – organ (1973–1978)
- Dirk Steffens – guitar (1973–1974)
- Horst Stachelhaus – bass, vocals (1977–1980, 1993–1999; died 1999)
- Wolfgang Horn – organ (1979–1981)
- Jurgen Goldschmidt – bass, vocals (1980–1983)
- Stefan Linke – guitar, vocals (1981–1983)
- Harald Meurer - keyboards (1981–82)
- Ulrich Klein – keyboards, vocals (1981–1983)
- Jörg Becker - keyboards (1983–84)
- Xaver Fischer – keyboards (1993–1999)
- Rocco Zodiak – guitar (1993–1995)
- Peter Engelhardt – guitar (1995–2011)
- Rainer Wind – bass (2000–2002)

== Discography ==
=== Studio albums ===
- Birth Control (1970)
- Operation (1971)
- Hoodoo Man (1972)
- Rebirth (1973)
- Plastic People (1975)
- Backdoor Possibilities (1976)
- Increase (1977)
- Titanic (1978)
- Count on Dracula (1980)
- Deal Done at Night (1981)
- Bäng (1982)
- Two Worlds (1995)
- Jungle Life (1996)
- Getting There (1999)
- Alsatian (2003)
- Here and Now (2016)
- Open Up (2022)

=== Live albums ===
- Live (1974)
- Live 79 (1979)
- Condomium (1994)
- Live Abortion (2000)
- Live in Lachendorf (2000)
- Live in Fulda (2004)
- Live at Rockpalast (35th Anniversary Tour) (2005)
- We Are Family (40th Anniversary Tour) (2009)
- Two Eggs - Two Concerts - The Ultimate Live Collection (2013)
- Live Harmonie Bonn (2018)

=== Compilations ===
- Believe in the Pill (1972)
- Best of (1977)
- Best of Vol 2 (1978)
- Rock on Brain (1980)
- The Very Best of (1990)
- Definitive Collection (1996)
