= The Cosmic Jokers =

West German krautrock band

The Cosmic Jokers were a West German krautrock supergroup, though they were never a proper ensemble per se; their music was created from sessions put together by label head Rolf-Ulrich Kaiser and Gille Lettman in early 1973, without the performers' knowledge. They were a primary example of space rock.

== History ==
The Cosmic Jokers performed at several acid parties to be held at the sound studio owned by Dieter Dierks, where musicians were offered drugs in exchange for recording tracks. Participants included Manuel Göttsching and Klaus Schulze of Ash Ra Tempel, Jürgen Dollase and Harald Grosskopf of Wallenstein, and Dierks. Prior to this, all of the musicians had been involved with Kaiser's Cosmic Couriers label.

Kaiser took the tapes from these sessions, edited and mixed them with Dierks, and released them on his label, Kosmische Musik, complete with the musicians' pictures on the LP sleeve. Göttsching did not find out about the record release until he heard it playing in a record store in Berlin and asked the counter help what was playing. Kaiser released five records under the name Cosmic Jokers in 1974, one of which was actually a label sampler and a second, Gilles Zeitschiff, consisted of Kaiser's then-girlfriend Gille Lettmann speaking over sounds taken from prior label releases. Schulze was not happy with the recordings, and was so angry after the release of Gilles Zeitschiff that he sued Kaiser.

== Discography ==
- The Cosmic Jokers (1974)
- Galactic Supermarket (1974)
- Planeten Sit-In (1974)
- Sci Fi Party (1974; Kosmische Musik label sampler)
- Gilles Zeitschiff (1974; compilation/remix album)
