= Ohr (record label) =

German record label

- Parent company: Metronome Musik GmbH
- Founded: 1970
- Founder: Rolf-Ulrich Kaiser
- Defunct: 1973
- Status: Inactive
- Distributor: PolyGram Records
- Genre: Psychedelic, progressive, folk, electronic
- Country of origin: Germany

Ohr ("Ear") was an influential German electronic/experimental record label set up by Rolf-Ulrich Kaiser in 1970.

Ohr released the debut albums of Tangerine Dream and Klaus Schulze.

== History ==
The first five Ohr releases featured sleeves by Reinhard Hippen, all with dismembered baby doll parts as a central aspect of the imagery. These were Tangerine Dream's Electronic Meditation, Bernt Witthüser's Lieder von Vampiren..., Embryo's Opal, Floh de Cologne's Fließbandbabys Beat-Show, and Limbus 4's Mandalas.

Other releases included Klaus Schulze, Ash Ra Tempel, Cosmic Jokers, Guru Guru, Popol Vuh, Sergius Golowin, Amon Düül, Birth Control, Witthüser & Westrupp, and numerous others. The Ohr office in New York City was run by Neil Kempfer-Stocker.

Kaiser also set up the label Pilz for more folkish/ethnic releases – such as Popol Vuh, Wallenstein and Hoelderlin. Further to this, he also set up the Cosmic Couriers label for more space-rock type releases – Cosmic Jokers, Ash Ra Tempel, Manuel Gottsching, et al.

Brain Records was set up when two disgruntled A&R men left Ohr to start their own label, taking Guru Guru with them.

== Discography ==
=== Albums ===
Catalog No.	Artist	Title	Year
OMM 56000	Floh de Cologne	Fließbandbabys Beat Show	March 1970
OMM 56001	Limbus 4	Mandalas	March 1970
OMM 56002	Bernd Witthüser	Lieder von Vampiren...	March 1970
OMM 56003	Embryo	Opal	April 1970
OMM 56004	Tangerine Dream	Electronic Meditation	June 1970
OMM 56005	Guru Guru	UFO	June 1970
OMM 2/56006	Various	Ohrenschmaus	September 1970
OMM 56007	Annexus Quam	Osmose	September 1970
OMM 56008	Amon Düül	Paradieswärts Düül	January 1971
OMM 56009	Roger Bunn	Peace of Mind	1971
OMM 56010	Floh de Cologne	Rockoper Profitgeier (live)	January 1971
OMM 56011	Paul und Limpe Fuchs/Anima	Stürmischer Himmel	January 1971
OMM 56012	Tangerine Dream	Alpha Centauri	January 1971
OMM 56013	Ash Ra Tempel	Ash Ra Tempel	March 1971
OMM 56014	Xhol	Hau-RUK	March 1971
OMM 56015	Birth Control	Operation	March 1971
OMM 56016	Witthüser & Westrupp	Trips und Träume	March 1971
OMM 556017	Guru Guru	Hinten	July 1971
OMM 2/56018	Various	Mittens Ins Ohr (sampler)	
OMM 556019	Mythos	Mythos	January 1972
OMM 556020	Ash Ra Tempel	Schwingungen	March 1972
OMM 2/56021	Tangerine Dream	Zeit	May 1972
OMM 556022	Klaus Schulze	Irrlicht	May 1972
OMM 556023	Walpurgis	Queen Of Saba	June 1972
OMM 556024	Xhol	Motherfuckers GmbH & Co. KG	1972
OMM 556025	Birth Control	Believe In The Pill	1972
OMM 2/56027	Various	Kosmische Musik	July 1972
OMM 556028	Annexus Quam	Beziehungen	July 1972
OMM 2/56029	Floh de Cologne	Lucky Strike Live	November 1972
OMM 556030	Arno Clauss	An Tante Gertie in Zons am Rhein	1972
OMM 556031	Tangerine Dream	Atem	January 1973
OMM 556032	Ash Ra Tempel	Join Inn	January 1973
OMM 556033	Floh de Cologne	Geyer-Symphonie	1973

=== Singles ===
Catalog No.	Artist	Title	Year
OS 57.000	Amon Düül	Eternal Flow / Paramechanical World	1970
OS 57.001	Floh de Cologne	St. Pauli, Du mein Loch zur Welt / Bruno-Lied	1970
OS 57.002	Witthüser & Westrupp	Einst kommt die Nacht / Wer schwimmt dort (Flipper)	1970
OS 57.003	Birth Control	Hope / Rollin’	1970
OS 57.004	Witthüser & Westrupp	Nimm einen Joint / Lasst uns auf die Reise gehen	1971
OS 57.005	Birth Control	The Work Is Done / Flesh And Blood	1971
OS 57.006	Tangerine Dream	Ultima Thule	1971
OS 57.007	Birth Control	What’s Your Name / Believe In The Pill	1972
OS 57.008	Golgatha	Dies Irae / Children’s Game	1972
OS 57.009	Floh de Cologne	Emil in Erkenschwick / Zahlen mußt Du	1972
OS 57.011	Arno Clauss	Karlchen oder So kann das nicht weitergeh’n / Manchen Leuten möchte ich gerne in die Fresse schlagen	
OS 57.012	Floh de Cologne	Der Löwenthaler / Bayerisches Heimatlied (with Dieter Süverkrüp)	1973

== See also ==
- List of record labels
- List of electronic music record labels
