= Manuel Göttsching =

German musician and composer (1952–2022)

Background information
- Born: 9 September 1952; West Berlin, West Germany
- Died: 4 December 2022 (aged 70) Berlin, Germany
- Genres: Krautrock; electronic; space rock; minimalism; ambient; experimental
- Occupations: Musician, composer
- Years active: 1970–2022
- Formerly of: Ash Ra Tempel; Ashra

Manuel Göttsching (9 September 1952 – 4 December 2022) was a German musician and composer.

As the leader of the groups Ash Ra Tempel and Ashra in the 1970s and 80s, as well as a solo artist, he was one of the most influential guitarists of the Krautrock (also known as Kosmische Musik) genre. He also participated in the Cosmic Jokers sessions. His style and technique influenced dozens of artists in the post-Eno ambient and Berlin School of electronic music scenes in the 1980s and 1990s.

== Early life ==
As a child, Göttsching was exposed to the music of Verdi and Puccini by his mother, who was a fan of opera. He also listened to radio stations run by American and British allied forces. Too young for early rock and roll, it was not until the 1960s that Göttsching found the music that really inspired him such as Motown music from the United States, as well the Rolling Stones and British blues bands. Originally a classical guitarist, the music he heard inspired him to switch to the electric guitar.

In school, Göttsching played with a cover band. "We played some Rolling Stones, we played some Beatles, we played some Who, some what was the popular music and that was just for fun," he recalls. However upon hearing Blue Cheer's proto-metal cover of "Summertime Blues" and learning about the free jazz movement inspired Göttsching and his bandmates to pursue a freer, more improvisatory approach to music.

== Ash Ra Tempel ==
Göttsching and his bandmates moved from song-based music to free improvisation, forming the musical group Ash Ra Tempel in 1970. "We didn't play blues," Göttsching recalls. "We used some elements of it but tried to keep the freestyle of improvisation and using some blues themes." Along with Göttsching, the group included Klaus Schulze (who had just left Tangerine Dream) and Hartmut Enke. Just after Ash Ra Tempel released its self-titled debut album in 1971, Schulze left to pursue what became a successful solo career. In the early 1970s, he joined some of his Ash Ra Tempel bandmates in the German group Eruption.

In 2000, Göttsching and Klaus Schulze released a studio album and a live album as Ash Ra Tempel. The live album was recorded as part of the Cornucopia concerts curated by Julian Cope at the Royal Festival Hall in London.

== Death ==
Göttsching died on 4 December 2022, at the age of 70.

== Legacy ==
Göttsching's 1981 album E2-E4 had a major influence on the development of electronica, especially the techno genre. Some suggest that Göttsching's playing might have had an influence on U2's The Edge echo-laden guitar style of the early to mid-eighties.

== Discography ==
=== Solo ===
- Inventions for Electric Guitar (1975)
- E2-E4 (1981, 1984)
- Dream & Desire (Recorded 1977, 1991, 2019)
- Die Mulde (1981, 1997, 2004, 2005)
- Concert for Murnau (2005)
- Live at Mt.Fuji (2007)
- Early Water (1995, 2023) (recorded 1976 with Michael Hoenig)

=== As Ash Ra Tempel ===
- Ash Ra Tempel (1971)
- Schwingungen (1972)
- Seven Up (with Timothy Leary, 1973)
- Join Inn (1973)
- Starring Rosi (1973)
- Le Berceau de Cristal (soundtrack) (1975)
- Friendship (with Klaus Schulze, 2000)

=== As Ashra ===
- 1976/1977/1976 – New Age of Earth (re-released in 2008 under Gottsching's name)
- 1978/1977 – Blackouts (re-released in 2008 under Gottsching's name)
- 1979/1978 – Correlations (5 disc expanded edition (Correlations Complete) including The Making Of released in 2008)
- 1980/1979 – Belle Alliance (2 disc expanded edition (Belle Alliance Plus) released in 2008)
- 1990/1988 – Walkin' the Desert
- 1991/1985–1986 – Tropical Heat
