= Ash Ra Tempel =

German krautrock group

- Origin: Berlin, Germany
- Genres: Krautrock; space rock; ambient; kosmische
- Years active: 1970–1976, 2000–2001
- Labels: Ohr; Virgin; Kosmische; King; Cleopatra
- Spinoffs: Ashra
- Spinoff of: Eruption
- Past members: Manuel Göttsching; Hartmut Enke; Klaus Schulze; Wolfgang Müller; Rosi Müller
- Website: Official site

Ash Ra Tempel was a German krautrock group led by guitarist Manuel Göttsching that was active from 1970 to 1976. Their debut album Ash Ra Tempel was released in 1971. Following the band's demise, Göttsching released music under the name Ashra.

== History ==
The group was founded by Göttsching, drummer Klaus Schulze, and bassist Hartmut Enke in 1971, following their participation in Conrad Schnitzler's short-lived group Eruption. Prior to Eruption, Schnitzler and Schulze had played together in Tangerine Dream.

Ash Ra Tempel released its self-titled debut album in June 1971; it is considered by critics to be a classic of the krautrock genre. Following the album's release, Schulze left for a solo career and subsequent albums utilized different drummers, frequently augmented by additional musicians. In 1972 the band collaborated with Timothy Leary, who was living in exile in Switzerland; an album, Seven Up, was released in 1973. On February 28, 1973, a reunion concert performance with the original line-up took place in Cologne. An album featuring the original three plus added vocalist Rosi Müller, Join Inn, was released later that year. After Join Inn, both Schulze and Enke departed and for the next album — Starring Rosi — the band was credited as only Göttsching and Müller, with special thanks to Harald Grosskopf on drums and engineer Dieter Dierks, who played bass.

In 1975 Göttsching released a solo album, Inventions for Electric Guitar, that was subtitled "Ash Ra Tempel VI" — dubbing it the sixth Ash Ra Tempel album. Later that year Göttsching collaborated on the soundtrack for Philippe Garrel's Le berceau de cristal with Lutz "Lüül" Ulbrich of Agitation Free. The soundtrack's first commercial release — under the Ash Ra Tempel banner — wasn't until 1993.

The next Ash Ra Tempel album, 1976's New Age of Earth — for all intents and purposes another Göttsching solo album — was re-released the following year under the band name Ashra, signaling the end of Ash Ra Tempel. Ashra continued to release music into the early 2000s.

When Julian Cope, musician and author of Krautrocksampler, invited Göttsching to perform at his April 2000 Cornucopea festival, an attempt was made to once again reunite the original trio. Unable to convince Enke to participate, Göttsching and Schulze nonetheless resurrected the Ash Ra Tempel name for the performance, releasing an album of new material — Friendship — later that year.

== Musical style and influence ==
Ash Ra Tempel exerted a relatively large influence on later space rock, krautrock, electronic and ambient music. The psychedelic bands Acid Mothers Temple and Hash Jar Tempo named themselves in reference to Ash Ra Tempel. The experimental rock ensemble Al Berkowitz covered "Light: Look At Your Sun," from Schwingungen, and featured it on their live album Apprenticeship and Attitude (2009). Hungarian psychedelic hardcore, 'shaman punk' band Galloping Coroners also said that they were influenced by Ash Ra Tempel in the late 1970s.

== Members ==
- Manuel Göttsching – guitars, synthesisers, vocals (1971–1976, 2000–2001; died 2022)
- Hartmut Enke – bass, guitars, synthesisers (1971–1973; died 2005)
- Klaus Schulze – drums, synthesisers, vocals (1971, 1972–1973, 2000–2001; died 2022)
- Wolfgang Müller – drums, percussion (1972)
- Rosi Müller – vocals (1973–1976)

== Discography ==
=== Ash Ra Tempel ===
==== Studio albums ====
- Ash Ra Tempel (1971)
- Schwingungen (1972)
- Seven Up (with Timothy Leary, 1973)
- Join Inn (1973)
- Starring Rosi (1973)
- Le Berceau de Cristal (soundtrack) (1975)
- Friendship (with Klaus Schulze, 2000)

==== Live albums ====
- Gin Rosé (2000) the Royal Festival Hall in London
- Ash Ra Tempel Experience (2017) Melbourne, M.G Art

==== Compilations ====
- The Best of the Private Tapes 2xCD (1998) (demo recordings)
- Schwingungen/Seven Up (1998) (Two original LP's on one CD)
- Join Inn/Starring Rosi (1998) (Two original LP's on one CD)

==== Other releases ====
- Inventions for Electric Guitar (1975). Credited to "Ash Ra Tempel, Manuel Göttsching", subtitled as Ash Ra Tempel VI, considered to be Manuel Göttsching's first solo album

=== Ashra ===
- See Ashra's discography

=== Ash Ra Tempel Experience ===
- Ash Ra Tempel Experience (2017, live album) M.G Art
