= Ton Steine Scherben discography =

Band discography

This following is a list of the work released by German rock band Ton Steine Scherben. It is currently missing the (few) singles issued by the band.

== Studio albums ==
- Warum geht es mir so dreckig? (1971)
- Keine Macht für Niemand (1972)
- Wenn die Nacht am tiefsten... (1974)
- IV (1980)
- Scherben (1983)

Collaborations

- Hoffmann's Comic Teater & Ton Steine Scherben – Herr Fressack und die Bremer Stadtmusikanten (1973)
- Dietmar Roberg & Ton Steine Scherben – Teufel hast du Wind (1976)
- Kollektiv Rote Rübe & Ton Steine Scherben – Paranoia (1976)
- Brühwarm & Ton Steine Scherben – Mannstoll (1977)
- Brühwarm & Ton Steine Scherben – Entartet! (1979)

== Compilations ==
- Auswahl I (1981)
  - Warum geht es mir so dreckig
  - Mein Name ist Mensch
  - Rauch Haus Song
  - Macht kaputt was euch kaputt macht
  - Wir streiken
  - Wenn die Nacht am tiefsten
  - Halt dich an deiner Liebe fest
  - Kribbel Krabbel
  - Guten Morgen
  - Keine Macht für Niemand

== Live albums ==
- In Berlin (Live) (1984)
  - Ich will nicht werden was mein Alter ist
  - Verboten
  - Feierabend
  - Heut' Nacht
  - Raus (aus dem Ghetto) (Out of the ghetto)
  - Ich will ich sein (I wanne be me)
  - Shit-Hit
  - Jenseits von Eden
  - La Reponse
  - Keine Macht für Niemand
- Live I (1985)

The following albums were issued after the band ceased recording:

- Live II (1996)
  - Wenn die Nacht am tiefsten
  - Wir müssen hier raus
  - Halt dich an deiner Liebe fest
  - Steig ein
  - Kleine Freuden
  - Bist du's
  - Kommen sie schnell
  - Der Traum ist aus
  - Land in Sicht
- Live III (2006)
  - Wo sind wir jetzt
  - Hau ab
  - S.N.A.F.T.
  - Ardistan
  - Heimweh
  - Alles verändert sich
  - Durch die Wüste
  - Warum geht es mir so dreckig
  - Ebbe und Flut
  - Mein Name ist Mensch
  - Rauch-Haus-Song
  - Allein machen sie dich ein
  - Wiedersehn
  - Der Turm stürzt ein
  - Lass uns ein Wunder sein
  - Jetzt schlägt's dreizehn (The clock strikes thirteen)

== Other ==
In 2006 the studio albums were re-issued, digitally remastered. Those parts of the last two studio albums for which the original recording session tapes remained in existence (about half of them having been destroyed in a fire) were also remixed, since the band had always been unhappy with quality of the original mixes. The packaging was made of paper instead of plastic, to resemble the original LP-wrapping. The box included 8 copies of original posters and an 80-page book with a short history of the band.

A year earlier, the CD "18 songs and 15 years" was published. The CD contained unreleased material, also digitally remastered.
