= Nurse with Wound list =

Of musicians and bands that influenced their albums

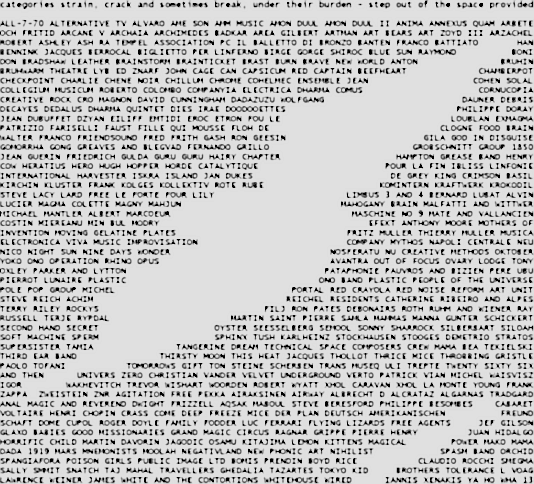
The Nurse with Wound list

The Nurse with Wound list is a list of musicians and bands that was included with Chance Meeting on a Dissecting Table of a Sewing Machine and an Umbrella (1979), the first album by Nurse with Wound. There are 291 entries on the list. (Note: There are 291 artists on the list if collaborations are counted as the same, LIMBUS 3 AND 4 are counted as the same, and XHOL CARAVAN/XHOL are counted as two.) The list was expanded with Nurse with Wound's second album, To the Quiet Men from a Tiny Girl (1980).

The list was compiled by the original Nurse with Wound trio of Steven Stapleton, John Fothergill, and Heman Pathak. It was intended as a homage to the artists who influenced the Nurse with Wound project. It has since become a type of 'shopping list' for collectors of outsider and avant-garde music.

Given their obscurity, some of the artists named on the list have been a mystery for many collectors. Stapleton has even boasted that some of the names on the list were invented, a statement denied by John Fothergill.

== A ==
- Agitation Free, German rock group.
- Pekka Airaksinen, Finnish musician and member of the group Sperm (see below).
- Airway, project of Joe Potts as part of the Los Angeles Free Music Society collective.
- Albrecht/d., German artist Dietrich Albrecht with ties to the Fluxus scene. He has worked with Joseph Beuys and Throbbing Gristle (see below).
- Alcatraz, German rock group.
- Älgarnas Trädgård, Swedish rock group.
- All 7-70, see Ritual All 770 (below).
- Alternative TV, British group led by Mark Perry of Sniffin' Glue fame. Has worked with Throbbing Gristle (see below). Also see Good Missionaries (below).
- Álvaro Peña-Rojas, Chilean singer and multi-instrumentalist. Famous for his "singing nose". Once a member of the pre-Clash band The 101ers.
- Ame Son, French rock group.
- AMM, British improv group. Currently the core members are just Eddie Prévost and John Tilbury, but has in the past included Keith Rowe, Lou Gare, Cornelius Cardew, Lawrence Sheaff, and Christopher Hobbs. Has worked with the MEV (see below).
- Amon Düül, German commune and rock group.
- Amon Düül II, German rock group.
- Anal Magic and Reverend Dwight Frizzell, American Dwight Frizzell assisted by a number of friends.
- Anima, German rock group sometimes going by the name Anima-Sound. Led by husband and wife Paul and Limpe Fuchs with assistance of Friedrich Gulda (see below) on some albums.
- Annexus Quam, German rock group.
- Aksak Maboul (Aqsak Maboul), Belgian group led by Marc Hollander. Have worked with Fred Frith (see below) and Chris Cutler of Henry Cow (see below). Part of the Rock in Opposition movement.
- Arbete och Fritid, Swedish rock group.
- Arcane V, French rock group.
- Archaïa, French zeuhl group.
- Archimedes Badkar, Swedish rock group.
- Area, Italian rock group. Members included Demetrio Stratos (see below), Paolo Tofani (see below), and Patrizio Fariselli (see below).
- Gilbert Artman, French musician and leader of the groups Lard Free (see below) and Urban Sax. Also a member of Clearlight, Delired Cameleon Family, Operation Rhino (see below), and Catalogue. Note there are no known recordings (before 1980) released under his solo name.
- Art Bears, British based trio of Fred Frith (see below), Chris Cutler, and Dagmar Krause, all of whom were members of Henry Cow (see below). Part of the Rock in Opposition movement.
- Art Zoyd (Art Zoyd III), French rock/modern-classical group. Part of the Rock in Opposition movement.
- Arzachel, British rock group sometimes going by the name Uriel. Later became the group Egg.
- Robert Ashley, American composer and experimentalist. Member of the ONCE Group and the Sonic Arts Union with David Behrman, Alvin Lucier (see below), and Gordon Mumma.
- Ash Ra Tempel, German rock group led by Manuel Göttsching. Part of the supergroup Cosmic Jokers. Released an album with Timothy Leary. Later albums credited as Ashra.
- Association P.C., jazz ensemble led by Dutchman Pierre Courbois.

== B ==
- Il Balletto di Bronzo, Italian rock group.
- Banten, Dutch group. Members include Jurre Haanstra, Ernst Reijseger, and Rob van den Broeck.
- Franco Battiato, Italian singer, composer, and songwriter.
- Han Bennink, Dutch jazz percussionist. One of the founding members of the Instant Composers Pool (with Misha Mengelberg and Willem Breuker). Has also worked with Peter Brötzmann, Fred Van Hove, Derek Bailey, Evan Parker, and Steve Beresford (see below).
- Steve Beresford, British multi-instrumentalists who has worked in a wide range of fields including jazz, film score, and pop. Some of these include Alterations, Derek Bailey, Han Bennick (see above), Flying Lizards (see below), and the Portsmouth Sinfonia.
- Jacques Berrocal, French trombonist, trumpeter, and all around multi-instrumentalist. Has worked with Nurse with Wound. Member of the groups Operation Rhino (see below) and Catalogue.
- Philippe Besombes, French musician and soundtrack/library music composer. Was a member of the group Pôle (see below).
- Biglietto per l'Inferno, Italian rock group.
- Birgé Gorgé Shiroc, French trio of Jean-Jacques Birgé, Francis Gorgé, and Shiroc. After the departure of Shiroc and the addition of Bernard Vitet they became the group Un Drame Musical Instantane. Birgé played also with Lard Free, Operation Rhino, Tamia, Luc Ferrari, Colette Magny and Raymond Boni (see below). He made light-shows for Gong (see below) and Red Noise (see below).
- Blue Effect, see Modry Efekt (below).
- Blue Sun, Danish group.
- Bomis Prendin, American group led by Bomis Prendin.
- Raymond Boni, French guitarist.
- Don Bradshaw-Leather, mysterious British musician once rumoured to be the creation of Robert John Godfrey (of the group The Enid).
- Brainstorm, German rock group.
- Brainticket, Belgian-led European rock group.
- Brast Burn, Japanese group. Labelmates of Karuna Khyal on Voice Records.
- Brave New World, German rock group.
- Anton Bruhin, Swiss sound experimentalist and maultrommel player. Has interpreted scores by Adolf Wölfli.
- Brühwarm, German group including Corny Littmann that collaborated with Ton Steine Scherben (see below).
- Franz de Byl, German guitarist.

== C ==
- Cabaret Voltaire, British group, originally a trio of Stephen Mallinder, Richard H. Kirk, and Chris Watson (also an early member of Hafler Trio). Labelmates of Throbbing Gristle (see below) on Industrial Records.
- John Cage, famous 20th-century American composer. Student of Henry Cowell and Arnold Schoenberg. Has worked with Merce Cunningham, David Tudor, Marcel Duchamp, Morton Feldman, Christian Wolff, Max Neuhaus, Lou Harrison, and Sun Ra.
- Can, German rock band. See Technical Space Composers Crew below.
- Capsicum Red, Italian rock group (but promoted as British).
- Captain Beefheart, American musician Don Van Vliet. Led the group The Magic Band which included Alexis Snouffer and Gary Lucas. Has worked with Frank Zappa (see below).
- Chamberpot, British jazz ensemble of Richard Beswick, Simon Mayo, Philipp Wachsmann, and Tony Wren.
- Checkpoint Charlie (band), German rock group.
- Chillum, British rock group. Side-project of the group Second Hand (see below).
- Henri Chopin, French sound poet. Published the audio-visual magazines Cinquième Saison and OU which featured works by members of Lettrisme, Fluxus, as well as Brion Gysin and William S. Burroughs.
- Chrome, American group consisting mainly of Damon Edge and Helios Creed.
- Cohelmec Ensemble, French jazz ensemble of François Méchali, Jean Cohen, Jean-Louis Mechali, and Joseph Dejean.
- Jean Cohen-Solal, French flute player. Has played with Cohelmec Ensemble (see above), Béatrice Tekielski (see below), and Olga Forest.
- Collegium Musicum, Slovak rock group.
- Roberto Colombo, Italian record producer who has recorded some solo rock albums.
- Come, William Bennett's pre-Whitehouse group (see below).
- Companyia Elèctrica Dharma, Catalan group.
- Comus, British folk group.
- Cornucopia, German rock group.
- Crass, British group. Members of which have worked with Nurse with Wound and Current 93.
- Creative Rock, German rock group.
- Cromagnon, American rock group.
- David Cunningham, British musician, composer, and producer. Also see Flying Lizards below.
- Cupol, duo of Graham Lewis and Bruce Gilbert, both from the British group Wire. Also see Dome (below).

== D ==
- Dadazuzu, German group that has only ever made 1 track for a compilation release.
- Wolfgang Dauner, German jazz pianist.
- Debris', American rock group.
- Decayes, American group. An offshoot of the Los Angeles Free Music Society.
- Dedalus, Italian rock group.
- The Deep Freeze Mice, British rock group.
- Deutsch Amerikanische Freundschaft (DAF), German group. Became a duo after a small number of LPs, moved to England, and made more commercial albums.
- Dharma Quintet, French jazz ensemble.
- Dies Irae, German rock group.
- Dome, another Wire side project by Graham Lewis and Bruce Gilbert. See Cupol above. Not to be confused with German group DOM.
- Doo-Dooettes, part of the Los Angeles Free Music Society.
- Philippe Doray, French musician. Has worked with Thierry Muller (see below).
- Roger Doyle, Irish musician and composer. In the group Operating Theatre which had an album released on United Dairies.
- Jean Dubuffet, French artist and creator of Art brut.
- Dzyan, German rock group.

== E ==
- Eiliff, German jazz-rock group.
- Emtidi, German space kraut-folk duo of Maik Hirschfeldt and Dolly Holmes.
- Eroc, German drummer and multi-instrumentaluist Joachim H. Ehrig. Was a member of Grobschnitt (see below).
- Etron Fou Leloublan, French rock group. Part of the Rock in Opposition movement.
- Exmagma, German rock group. They have no relation to the French band Magma.

== F ==
- Family Fodder, British rock group led by Alig Fodder.
- Patrizio Fariselli, Italian pianist and member of Area (see above).
- Faust, German rock group. Has worked with Slapp Happy and Tony Conrad. A later version of the group has worked with Nurse with Wound.
- Luc Ferrari, French composer and musique concrète practitioner.
- Fille qui mousse, French rock group.
- Floh de Cologne, German rock group.
- Flying Lizards, British group led by David Cunningham (see above). Also see Steve Beresford (above).
- Food Brain, Japanese rock group.
- Förklädd Gud (God in Disguise), Swedish avant-garde jazz group.
- Walter Franco, Brazilian singer and composer.
- Free Agents, project of Pete Shelley of Buzzcocks fame.
- Friendsound, American rock group led by Drake Levin of Paul Revere & the Raiders fame.
- Fred Frith, British guitarist and multi-instrumentalist. Was in the groups Henry Cow (see below) and Art Bears (see above).

== G ==
- Gash, German rock band.
- Ron Geesin, British composer, musician, producer. Has worked with Pink Floyd.
- Gila, German rock group.
- Jef Gilson, French musician.
- Glaxo Babies, British rock group.
- God in Disguise, see Förklädd Gud (above)
- Gomorrha, German rock group.
- Gong, British/French rock group.
- Good Missionaries, side-project of Alternative TV (see above).
- Le Grand Magic Circus, French performance group. Danny Elfman was once a member.
- John Greaves and Peter Blegvad (and Lisa Herman), collaboration between members of Henry Cow (see below) and Slapp Happy.
- Fernando Grillo, Italian contrabass player with ties to the Fluxus scene.
- Ragnar Grippe, Swedish electronic musician composer.
- Grobschnitt, German rock group. Also see Eroc (above).
- Group 1850, Dutch rock group.
- Jean Guérin, French multi-instrumentalist.
- Friedrich Gulda Austrian pianist and composer. Was a member of Anima-Sound (see above).
- Guru Guru, German rock group. Also see Uli Trepte (below).

== H ==
- Hairy Chapter, German rock group.
- Hampton Grease Band, American rock group.
- Henry Cow, British group founded by Fred Frith (see above) and Tim Hodgkinson. Part of the Rock in Opposition movement. Collaborated with the group Slapp Happy and eventually merged with them. Other members have included Chris Cutler, John Greaves, Dagmar Krause, Peter Blegvad, Anthony Moore (see below), Geoff Leigh, Lindsay Cooper, and Georgie Born. Also see Art Bears (above), Fred Frith (above), and Greaves and Blegvad (above).
- Pierre Henry, French electronic music composer. Collaborated with Pierre Schaeffer on the invention of musique concrète. Has worked with Spooky Tooth, Urban Sax, and The Violent Femmes.
- Heratius, French rock group.
- Hero, Italian rock group.
- Juan Hidalgo, Spanish musician.
- Hugh Hopper, British musician, bass player for Soft Machine.
- Horde Catalytique pour la Fin, French rock group.
- Horrific Child, French musician Jean-Pierre Massiera. Goes under the aliases Herman's Rocket, Charlie Mike Sierra, and Les Maledictus Sound.

== I ==
- Ibliss, German rock group. Includes former members of Organisation/Kraftwerk (see below).
- L'Infonie, Quebecois rock group.
- International Harvester, Swedish rock group. Have also released albums as Pärson Sound, Harvester, and Träd, Gräs & Stenar.
- Iskra, Swedish jazz group. Not to be confused with Iskra 1903.
- Island, Swiss rock group.

== J ==
- Martin Davorin-Jagodić, Croatian composer. Has worked with John Cage (see above).
- Jan Dukes de Grey, British folk group.

== K ==
- King Crimson, British group led by Robert Fripp. Violinist David Cross has released a track on a United Dairies compilation.
- Basil Kirchin, British musician and film composer.
- Osamu Kitajima, Japanese composer and musician.
- Kluster, German trio of Hans-Joachim Roedelius, Dieter Moebius, and Conrad Schnitzler. Later split into Cluster and Conrad Schnitzler solo. Related to the band Eruption.
- Frank Köllges (misspelled Kolges on the list), German musician.
- Kollektiv Rote Rübe, German rock group. Has worked with Ton Steine Scherben (see below). Not to be confused with Kollektiv.
- Komintern, French rock group.
- Kraftwerk, German electronic-rock group. Former members have gone into Ibliss (see above), Neu! (see below), and Fritz Müller Rock (see below).
- Krokodil, Swiss rock group.

== L ==
- Steve Lacy, American jazz saxophonist & composer. Member of The Jazz Composer's Orchestra. Worked with Cecil Taylor, Don Cherry, Michael Mantler (see below), Alvin Curran, Frederic Rzewski, Michel Waisvisz (see below), Han Bennink (see above), and Brion Gysin.
- Lard Free, French rock group led by Gilbert Artman (see above).
- Le Forte Four, part of the Los Angeles Free Music Society.
- Lemon Kittens, British duo of Karl Blake and Danielle Dax. Released an album on United Dairies.
- Lily, German rock group.
- Limbus 3/Limbus 4, two versions of a German rock group. The 3 and 4 refer to the number of members, not album number (thus there is no Limbus 1 or Limbus 2).
- Bernard Lubat, French jazz musician.
- Alvin Lucier, American musician and composer. Part of the Sonic Arts Union.

== M ==
- Magical Power Mako, Japanese rock group.
- Magma, French rock group led by Christian Vander (see below).
- Colette Magny, French singer, songwriter, and composer.
- Mahjun, French rock group led by Jean-Louis Mahjun.
- Mahogany Brain, French rock group.
- Malfatti-Wittwer, jazz duo of Austrian Radu Malfatti and Swiss Stephan Wittwer.
- Mama Dada 1919, American rock group.
- Michael Mantler, Austrian musician. Member of The Jazz Composer's Orchestra. Has worked with Steve Lacy (see above), Carla Bley, Terje Rypdal (see below), and Robert Wyatt (see below).
- Albert Marcoeur, French musician.
- Mars, American rock group. Members: Sumner Crane, Nancy Arlen, Mark Cunningham, and China Burg.
- Maschine Nr. 9, 1974 German audio play by Wolf Wondratschek, Georg Deuter and Bernd Brummbär
- Mate and Vallancien, French duo of Philippe Mate and Daniel Vallancien.
- Costin Miereanu, French composer and musician.
- Min Bul, Norwegian jazz-rock trio of Terje Rypdal (see below), Bjørnar Andresen, and Espen Rud.
- Mnemonists, American group. Later became the group Biota.
- Modry Efekt (Blue Effect), Czech rock group.
- Moolah, American duo of Maurice Roberson and Walter Burns.
- Anthony Moore, British musician. Was member of Slapp Happy and Henry Cow (see above).
- Mothers of Invention, American rock group featuring Frank Zappa (see below). Some other members included Jimmy Carl Black, Don Preston, Bunk Gardner, and Ray Collins.
- Moving Gelatine Plates, French group.
- Fritz Müller (Fritz Müller Rock), German musician Eberhard Kranemann. Was member of Kraftwerk (see above) and Neu! (see below).
- Thierry Müller, French musician and leader of the group Ilitch. Also in the group Ruth with Ruth Ellyeri and Philippe Doray (see above).
- Musica Elettronica Viva (MEV), American-European improv group. Members have included Alvin Curran, Frederic Rzewski, Richard Teitelbaum, Allan Bryant, Ivan Coaquette, and Ivan Vandor. Has worked with AMM (see above).
- Music Improvisation Company, British jazz ensemble led by Derek Bailey.
- Mythos, German rock group.

== N ==
- Napoli Centrale, Italian rock group.
- Negativland, American group.
- Neu!, German duo formed by ex-members of Kraftwerk (see above). La Düsseldorf is a related band. Also see Fritz Müller (above).
- New Phonic Art, French jazz ensemble led by Vinko Globokar. Also featuring Michel Portal (see below), Jean-Pierre Drouet, and Carlos Roqué Alsina.
- Nico, German singer best known for being on the first Velvet Underground (see below) album.
- Night Sun, German rock group.
- Nihilist Spasm Band, Canadian noise/free improv group.
- Nine Days Wonder, German rock group.
- Nosferatu, German rock group, not the English band of the same name or the English D2.
- Nu Creative Methods, French jazz duo of Bernard Pruvost and Pierre Bastien.

== O ==
- Oktober, German rock group.
- Yoko Ono, Japanese artist involved in the Fluxus scene. Later married John Lennon of the Beatles.
- Operation Rhino, French jazz ensemble of Gilbert Artman (see above), Pierre Bastien, Claude Bernard, Jacques Berrocal (see above), Raymond Boni (see above), Evan Chandlee, Mino Cinélu, Dominique Christian, Daniel Deshays, Harald Kenietzo, Tonia Munuera, Itaru Oki, Alain Pinsolle, Philippe Pochan, Patrice Raux, Richard Raux, François Tusques, and Mallot Vallois.
- Opus Avantra, Italian rock group led by Alfredo Tisocco and Donella Del Monaco.
- Orchid Spangiafora, American audio collage artist
- Out of Focus, German rock group.
- Ovary Lodge, British group led by Keith Tippett.
- Tony Oxley, British jazz drummer.

== P ==
- Parker and Lytton, British duo of Evan Parker and Paul Lytton.
- Pataphonie, French rock band.
- Pauvros and Bizien, French duo of Jean-François Pauvros and Gaby Bizien
- Pere Ubu, American rock group.
- Pierrot Lunaire, Italian rock group.
- Der Plan, German group originally consisting of Frank Fenstermacher, Moritz R, and Pyrolator.
- Plastic Ono Band, group led by John Lennon and Yoko Ono (see above).
- Plastic People of the Universe, Czech rock group.
- Poison Girls, British rock group on Crass Records.
- Pôle, French rock group led by Paul Putti. Members also included Jean-Louis Rizet and Philippe Besombes (see above). Not to be confused with the Besombes-Rizet album titled Pôle.
- The Pop Group, British rock group.
- Michel Portal, French clarinettist
- Public Image Ltd, British musician John Lydon's post-Sex Pistols group. Notable members included Keith Levene, Jah Wobble, and Martin Atkins

== R ==
- Red Krayola (Red Crayola), American rock group led by Mayo Thompson. Thompson was once a member of the listed group Pere Ubu.
- Red Noise, French rock group led by Patrick Vian (see below). Not to be confused with Bill Nelson's Red Noise.
- Reform Art Unit, Austrian jazz ensemble founded by Walter Malli, Sepp Mitterbauer, and Fritz and Kristin Novotny.
- Steve Reich, American composer and musician.
- Achim Reichel, German guitarist and leader of the group A.R. & Machines.
- The Residents, American group.
- Catherine Ribeiro + Alpes, French avant-rock group.
- Boyd Rice, American musician and creative force behind NON.
- Terry Riley, American composer and musician.
- Ritual ALL-7-70, American group led by Alan Sondheim.
- Claudio Rocchi, Italian musician.
- Rocky's Filj, Italian jazz-rock group.
- Ron 'Pate's Debonairs, American performance-rock group featuring Fred Lane.
- Roth, Rühm, & Wiener, see Selten Gehörte Musik (below).
- Ray Russell, British guitarist.
- Terje Rypdal, Norwegian jazz guitarist.

== S ==
- Martin Saint-Pierre, Argentinian percussionist.
- Samla Mammas Manna, Swedish rock group. Part of the Rock in Opposition movement.
- Günter Schickert, German guitarist.
- Second Hand, British rock group. also see Chillum (above).
- Secret Oyster, Danish rock group.
- Seesselberg, German electronic duo of Eckart and Wolf Seesselberg
- Selten Gehörte Musik, Austrian group featuring Dieter Roth, Gerhard Rühm, and Oswald Wiener. Part of the Viennese Actionism art movement which also included Rudolf Schwarzkogler and Hermann Nitsch.
- Semool, French rock group.
- Sonny Sharrock, American jazz guitarist.
- Silberbart, German rock group.
- Siloah, German rock group.
- Smegma, part of the Los Angeles Free Music Society.
- LaDonna Smith and Davey Williams, American musicians and founders of the Trans Museq record label.
- Sally Smmit, project of Sally Timms who is a member of the British group Mekons.
- Alan Sondheim, see Ritual All 770 (above).
- Snatch, American duo of Judy Nylon and Patti Palladin. Has worked with Brian Eno.
- Soft Machine, British rock group.
- Sperm, Finnish group led by Pekka Airaksinen (see above).
- Sphinx Tush, German group that became Tomorrow's Gift' (see below). Only recorded one song (but appears in two different versions).
- Karlheinz Stockhausen, German composer and pioneer of electronic music.
- Stooges, American rock band.
- Demetrio Stratos, Greek singer and musician. Was a member of the Italian group Area (see above).
- Supersister, Dutch rock band.

== T ==
- Taj Mahal Travellers, Japanese group led by Takehisa Kosugi.
- Tamia, French singer.
- Tangerine Dream, German group.
- Ghédalia Tazartès, French composer and musician.
- Technical Space Composers Crew, duo of Holger Czukay and Rolf Dammers. Holger later went on to join Can (see above).
- Mama Béa Tekielski, French singer.
- Theatre du Chene Noir, French performance/rock group.
- Third Ear Band, British rock group.
- Thirsty Moon, German rock group.
- This Heat, British trio of Charles Hayward, Charles Bullen, and Gareth Williams.
- Jacques Thollot, French jazz musician.
- Thrice Mice, German jazz-rock group.
- Throbbing Gristle, British group and founders of Industrial Records.
- Paolo Tofani, Italian musician. Was member of the group Area (see above).
- Tokyo Kid Brothers, Japanese performance-rock group.
- Tolerance, Japanese rock group.
- Tomorrow's Gift, German rock group. Also see Sphinx Tush (above).
- Ton Steine Scherben, German rock group.
- Trans Museq, see LaDonna Smith & Davey Williams (above).
- Uli Trepte, bass player and founding member of Guru Guru (see above).
- Twenty Sixty Six and Then, a.k.a. 2066 and Then, German rock group.

== U ==
- Univers Zero, Belgian rock group. Part of the Rock in Opposition movement.

== V ==
- Christian Vander, French musician and leader of the group Magma (see above).
- Velvet Underground, American rock group with ties to Andy Warhol's Factory. Members included Lou Reed, John Cale, Moe Tucker, Sterling Morrison, and Nico (see above).
- Vertø, French duo of Gilles Goubin and Jean-Pierre Grasset.
- Patrick Vian, French musician. Was in the group Red Noise (see above).
- L. Voag, British musician Jim Welton. Has works under a number of aliases such as Amos and The Just Measures. Was a member of the group The Homosexuals.

== W ==
- Michel Waisvisz, Dutch electronic music designer and performer.
- Igor Wakhevitch, French multi-instrumentalist and avant-garde composer.
- Lawrence Weiner, American visual and soundtext artist.
- Trevor Wishart, British musician.
- James White and the Contortions, refers to two groups led by American James White: The Contortions and James White and the Blacks.
- Whitehouse, British group led by William Bennett. Preceded by the group Come (see above). Has worked with Nurse with Wound.
- Wired, German jazz ensemble led by Michael Ranta.
- Woorden, Dutch rock group.
- Robert Wyatt, British drummer, vocalist and multi-instrumentalist. Was a member of the groups Soft Machine (see above) and Matching Mole.

== X ==
- Iannis Xenakis, Greek composer for orchestra and electronics.
- Xhol Caravan/Xhol, German rock group.

== Y ==
- Ya Ho Wha 13, American commune and rock group. Recorded under various names such as Father Yod And The Spirit Of '76 and Fire, Water, Air. Sky Saxon, from the group The Seeds, was once a member of the commune, though he did not participate in the rock band.
- La Monte Young, American composer and musician.

== Z ==
- Frank Zappa, American musician and composer. Was member of the Mothers of Invention (see above) and has worked with Captain Beefheart (see above).
- ZNR (Zazou 'n' Racaille), French rock group led by Hector Zazou and Joseph Racaille.
- Zweistein, German rock group.
