= Keine Macht für Niemand =

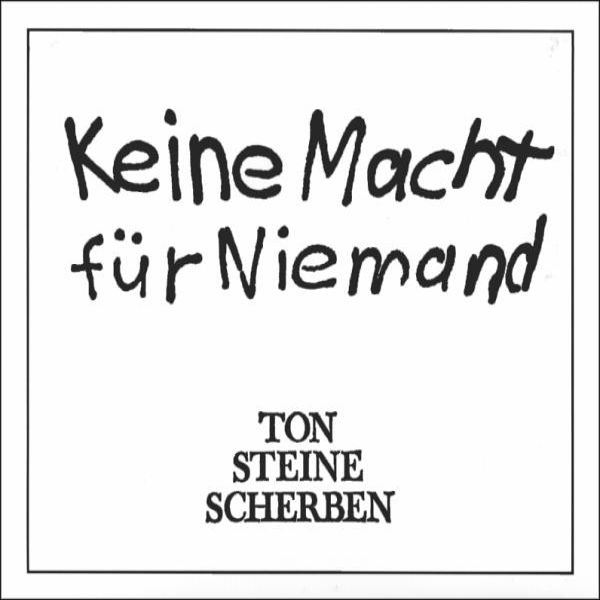

Studio album by Ton Steine Scherben
- Released: October 1972
- Recorded: Spring 1972
- Studio: Alsterstudio (Hamburg); Tonstudio Admiralstraße (Berlin)
- Genre: German rock; blues rock; protopunk; progressive rock
- Length: 62:08
- Label: David Volksmund
- Producer: Ton Steine Scherben

Ton Steine Scherben chronology
Warum geht es mir so dreckig? (1971)	Keine Macht für Niemand (1972)	Wenn die Nacht am tiefsten… (1975)

Keine Macht für Niemand (“No power for nobody”) is the name of both the second album and best-known song by the German rock band Ton Steine Scherben. The double album, released in 1972, is also sometimes called “die Weiße” (“the white one”) in reference to its simple cover with a white background and black text.

The album as a whole, as well as the song Keine Macht für Niemand heavily criticised social and political ills. The lyrics call for resistance against the extant system. In Die letzte Schlacht gewinnen wir (“We will win the final battle”), the demand for a replacement of the present capitalist system is very clear. The phrase “No power for nobody” is a sloganised interpretation of anarchy. When the album was released, Rio Reiser and R. P. S. Lanrue had still yet to adopt their stage names.

== Use as a slogan ==
According to Rio Reiser, the phrase came from an anarchist publication called Germania. Similarly, the song Macht kaputt, was euch kaputt macht also has a title in the same vein. In Germany, even 35 years after the album's release, the phrase will appear on banners and posters produced in the leftist scene, or as graffiti; the song's lyrics call to “write the slogan onto every wall.”

== Title ==
1. Wir müssen hier raus! (Ralph Möbius, Ralph Steitz) – 5:21
2. Feierabend (Möbius, Steitz) – 4:41
3. Die letzte Schlacht gewinnen wir (Möbius, Steitz) – 4:18
4. Paul Panzers Blues (Nikel Pallat, Möbius) – 6:41
5. Menschenjäger (Möbius, Steitz) – 4:18
6. Allein machen sie Dich ein (Möbius, Steitz) – 4:41
7. Schritt für Schritt ins Paradies (Möbius, Steitz) – 6:52
8. Der Traum ist aus (Möbius) – 9:24
9. Mensch Meier (Möbius, Steitz) – 3:43
10. Rauch-Haus-Song (Möbius) – 3:59
11. Keine Macht für Niemand (Möbius, Steitz) – 4:08
12. Komm schlaf bei mir (Möbius) – 4:02

== Lineup ==
- Ralph Möbius – vocals, guitar, piano, clavinet
- Ralph Steitz – guitar, drums, backup vocals
- Kai Sichtermann – bass guitar, banjo, backup vocals
- Nikel Pallat – vocals, backup vocals
- Jörg Schlotterer – flute, backup vocals
- Angie Olbrich – backup vocals
- Anna Schimany – backup vocals
- Olaf Lietzau – drums
- Jochen Petersen – saxophone
- Klaus Schulz – cowbell
- Eva Zeltner & Rauch-Haus-Chor – backup vocals
- Gaby Borowski & Rauch-Haus-Chor – backup vocals
- Klaus Freudigmann – sound engineer
- Richard Borowski – sound engineer
- Hendrick Knoch – additional sound engineer
- Gert Möbius – cover design

== Reception ==
Professional ratings
Review scores
Source	Rating
Laut.de	5/5 stars

Musikexpress ranked Keine Macht für Niemand number 3 in its list of the 100 best German albums of all time.

It was voted number 4 in the list of the 50 best German albums of all time in the German-language edition of Rolling Stone.

The German band Kraftklub named their album Keine Nacht für Niemand (“No night for nobody”) after it.

== Literature ==
- Hartmut El Kurdi: Schwarzrote Pop-Perlen. Band 2 der Reihe The Essence of Rock. Laatzen: Wehrhahn, 2001. ISBN 3-932324-82-X
