= Wenn die Nacht am tiefsten... =

Wenn die Nacht am tiefsten…

Studio album by Ton Steine Scherben
- Released: September 1975
- Recorded: Alsterstudio, Hamburg
- Genre: German rock, Protopunk
- Length: 82:31
- Label: David Volksmund
- Producer: Ton Steine Scherben

Ton Steine Scherben chronology
Keine Macht für Niemand (1972)	Wenn die Nacht am tiefsten… (1975)	IV (1981)

Wenn die Nacht am tiefsten… ("When the night is at its darkest…") is the third album by Ton Steine Scherben, released in 1975. It is the last one released before their six-year break from recording. It shows the first signs of a change in genre: moving away from Macht kaputt, was euch kaputt macht ("Destroy what destroys you") towards Halt dich an deiner Liebe fest ("Hold tight on your love").

According to former band member Nikel Pallat, the title of the album is based on a quote from Vietnamese communist leader Ho Chi Minh. The second part of the quote continues, "the day is next" ("ist der Tag am nächesten").

== History ==
From 1973 to 1974, the band's interest steadily declined in being the "political musicbox" of the leftist scene. This was compounded by the problem that one could at most request an entrance fee as "contribution of solidarity" from the audience, which was difficult to live on. As such, the band slowly distanced itself from the slogans of the leftist squatting scene, even if they remained faithful to the ideology. Financial problems led to a breakup of the band in 1973. The band soon reunited, but without the bassist Kai Sichtermann. He was replaced by Gino Götz, who had already collaborated with the band on the children's radio play Teufel hast du Wind. Aside from that, the band still lacked a steady percussionist. (On the album Keine Macht für Niemand, the percussion was primarily played by Olaf Lietzau. He would have been suitable, but was still underaged and could not go on tour with the band.) The drummer that the band decided on—Funky K. Götzner—remained with the group from that point onwards. With this lineup, the decision was made to produce a new LP.

== The songs ==
- Samstagnachmittag ("Saturday Afternoon") was used (without music) in a play by the Roten Steine. The new accompaniment contains musical appropriations from Macht kaputt, was euch kaputt macht.
- Durch die Wüste ("Through the desert") is a science fiction piece. The title is borrowed from a novel by Karl May. Every album since Keine Macht für Niemand ("Menschenjäger") has a song with a title borrowed from a Karl May novel.
- Nimm den Hammer ("Take the hammer") is an adaption of the skiffle song "Take This Hammer".
- Ich geh weg ("I'm leaving") was written in Ireland during a vacation.
- Land in Sicht ("Land in sight") originally had English lyrics. As of release, it was already three years old.
- Wenn die Nacht am tiefsten… ("When the night is at its darkest…") is also from the same period.
- Steig ein ("Get in") is the longest song by the Scherben (over 20 minutes). It consists of three portions: a long intro in which Rio tells the story of a dream, the song itself, followed by a jam to the end. The jam incorporates elements from both old (Der Kampf geht weiter and Allein machen sie dich ein) as well as new (Heut' Nacht und Nimm den Hammer) songs.

== Track listing ==
=== First LP ===
1. Heut Nacht (Ralph Möbius, R. P. S. Lanrue) – 6:15
2. Samstag Nachmittag (Möbius, Lanrue) – 5:01
3. Guten Morgen (Nikel Pallat, Möbius) – 4:16
4. Durch die Wüste (Möbius, Lanrue) – 4:59
5. Nimm den Hammer (Möbius, Lanrue) – 5:22
6. Ich geh weg (Möbius, Lanrue) – 3:23
7. Halt dich an deiner Liebe fest (Möbius, Lanrue) – 6:58
8. Wir sind im Licht (Pallat, Lanrue) – 5:31
- Length-41:59

=== Second LP ===
1. Wenn die Nacht am tiefsten… (Möbius, Lanrue) – 3:31
2. Land in Sicht (Möbius, Lanrue) – 7:11
3. Komm an Bord (Möbius, Lanrue) – 9:14
4. Steig ein (Möbius, Lanrue) – 20:50
- Length-39:55

== Lineup ==
- Ralph Möbius – Vocals, Guitar, Keyboards
- R. P. S. Lanrue – Guitar, Backup vocals
- Funky K. Götzner – Drums
- Werner "Gino" Götz – Bass, saxophone
- Nikel Pallat – Vocals
- Jörg Schlotterer – Flute
- Jako Benz – Guitar
- Vegas von Trantor – Percussion
- Angie Olbrich – Backup vocals
- Britta Neander – Backup vocals
- Marcus Zeltner – Backup vocals
- Gaby Borowski – Backup vocals
- Richard Borowski – Sound

== Miscellaneous ==
- On pseudonyms: R. P. S. Lanrue is Ralph Peter Steitz; the "K" in Funky K. Götzner stands for "Klaus". (The nickname "Funky" stems from a classified ad he posted looking for a funk band.) Vegas von Trantor (a name from a science fiction novel) was born as "Uli Hammer". Ralph Möbius used the name "Rio Reiser" from the following album onwards.
