= Sarcelles - Lochères =

Sarcelles – Lochères

Studio album by Red Noise
- Released: 1970
- Studio: Studio Europa Sonor
- Genres: Progressive rock; protopunk
- Label: Futura Records
- Producer: Gérard Terronès

Sarcelles – Lochères is the only album from the progressive rock/protopunk French band Red Noise, of whom Patrick Vian was the most notable member.

== History ==
Vian had gained some prominence as a guitar player with Red Noise (which was associated with Ame Son); the band formed at the Sorbonne in 1968, and played its first show during the occupation of the university. According to Vian, these were exciting times: he later commented that in Red Noise's early days, "their concerts wouldn't end until the cops came."

The band released its only album, Sarcelles – Lochères, in 1970. The group broke up after being arrested in the Netherlands for possession of hash. Given the revolutionary times, the band split rather appropriately into a socialist and a Trotskyist section, the latter of which continued under the name Komintern.

Sarcelles – Lochères was released on LP in 1970, and re-released on CD by Futura Records in 1996.

== Track listing ==
1. Cosmic, Toilet Ditty (0:39)
2. Caka Slow / Vertebrate Twist (4:20)
3. Obsession Sexuelle N°1 (0:28)
4. Galactic Sewe-Song (4:03)
5. Obsession Sexuelle N°2 (0:12)
6. Red Noise Live Au Café Des Sports (2:07)
7. Existential-Import of the Screw-Driver Eternity Twist (2:02)
8. 20 Mirror Mozarts Composing On Tea Bag And 1/2 Cup Bra (2:28)
9. Red Noise En Direct Du Buffet De La Gare (2:14)
10. A La Mémoire Du Rockeur Inconnu (0:39)
11. Petit Précis D'Instruction Civique (0:35)
12. Sarcelles C'Est L'Avenir (18:56)

== Personnel ==
=== Musicians ===
- Patrick Vian – guitar, vocals
- Philip Barry – guitar, drums, vocals
- Daniel Geoffroy – bass, vocals
- John Livengood – organ
- Austin Blue – percussion
- Jean-Claude Cenci – saxophone, flute, vocals

=== Production ===
- Produced by Gérard Terronès
- Recorded on 28 November 1970, at studio Europasonor, engineered by Pierre Guichon

=== Artwork ===
- Patrick Vian – collage
- Jean Buzelin – cover
- H. van der Meer – painting
