= Warum geht es mir so dreckig? =

Studio album by Ton Steine Scherben
- Released: September 1971
- Recorded: Tonstudio Admiralstraße, Berlin
- Genre: German rock, Protopunk
- Length: 42:45
- Label: David Volksmund
- Producer: Ton Steine Scherben

Ton Steine Scherben chronology
Warum geht es mir so dreckig? (1971)	Keine Macht für Niemand (1972)

Warum geht es mir so dreckig? (Why am I so miserable?) is the first album released by the German rock band Ton Steine Scherben. It includes—among other pieces—the song Macht kaputt, was euch kaputt macht ("Destroy what is destroying you"), which expressed the built-up anger and radicalization of the youth of the late 1960s and early 1970s.

== Recording ==
In 1971, after the release of the first single "Macht kaputt, was euch kaputt macht", the band went to Klaus Freudigmann's studio in Berlin to record their first album. The setup for the recordings was not ideal, and the sound quality suffered as a result. This is not surprising, as all the band's output was self-produced. As such, the recording sessions were also not entirely satisfactory. In June, Agit 883 and Rote Hilfe—anarchist and leftist political organisations respectively—organised an "informational event" about the empty buildings on the Mariannenplatz in Kreuzberg. Ton Steine Scherben were invited to play, and the teach-in turned into a party which led to one of the first spontaneous squatting actions in Berlin. The recordings of the concert were used for the album's first side; the b-side consists of highlights of the studio recordings. The album's sound has been described as raw and energetic, but the sound quality is somewhat lacking. The fifth track, "Das Einheitsfrontlied" is not listed on the back of the album or in the booklet.

== Track listing ==
=== Side 1 ===
1. Ich will nicht werden was mein Alter ist (Ralph Möbius) – 5:05
2. Warum geht es mir so dreckig (R. Möbius, Ralph Steitz) – 5:08
3. Der Kampf geht weiter (R. Möbius, R. Steitz) – 6:48
4. Macht kaputt was euch kaputt macht (R. Möbius) – 3:31
5. Das Einheitsfrontlied (Bertolt Brecht, Hanns Eisler) – 3:26

=== Side 2 ===
1. Mein Name ist Mensch (R. Möbius) – 6:52
2. Sklavenhändler (R. Möbius) – 2:37
3. Alles verändert sich (Gert Möbius, R. Möbius) – 4:17
4. Solidarität (R. Möbius, R. Steitz) – 5:01

== Lineup ==
- Ralph Möbius – Vocals, guitar, piano
- Ralph Steitz – Guitar, drums, Percussion, vocals
- Kai Sichtermann – Bass guitar, Percussion, vocals
- Wolfgang Seidel – Drums, percussion
- Nikel Pallat – vocals
- Gert Möbius – cover

Ralph Möbius began using the stage name Rio Reiser six years later. Ralph Steitz also had not yet adopted the stage name R. P. S. Lanrue.
