= Stadum =

- Municipality
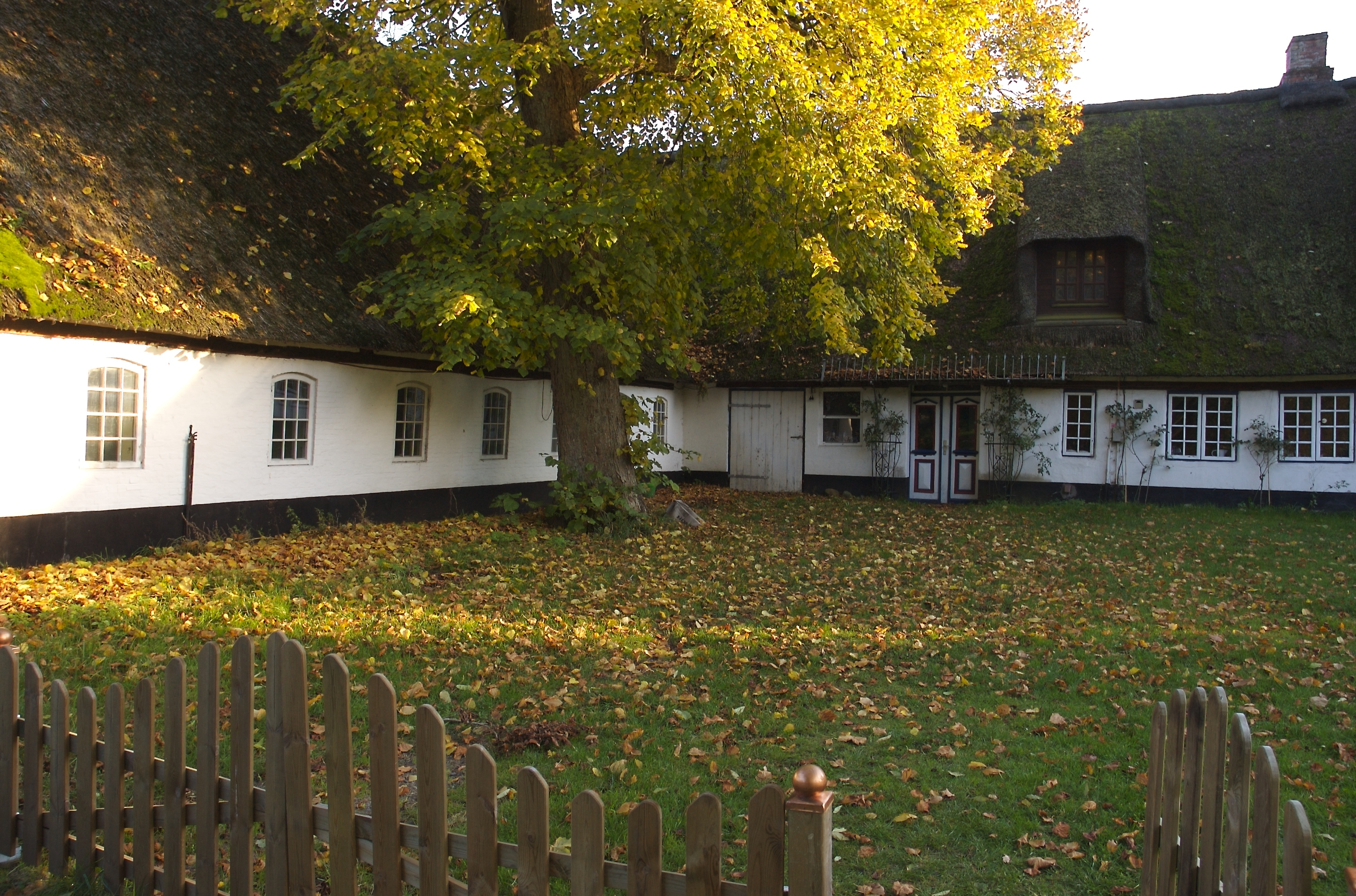
- Rio Reiser's house in Fresenhagen

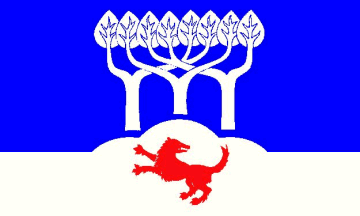
- Flag Coat of arms

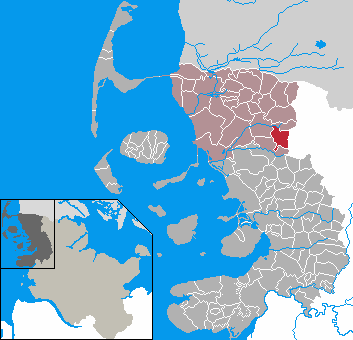
- Location of Stadum within Nordfriesland district
- Interactive map of Stadum
- Location within Germany Location within Schleswig-Holstein
- Coordinates: 54°43′N 9°3′E
- Country: Germany
- State: Schleswig-Holstein
- District: Nordfriesland
- Municipal assoc.: Südtondern

Government
  - Mayor: Werner Klingebiel

Area
  - Total: 19.74 km^{2} (7.62 sq mi)
- Elevation: 5 m (16 ft)

Population (2025-12-31)
  - Total: 919
  - Density: 46.6/km^{2} (121/sq mi)
- Time zone: UTC+01:00 (CET)
  - Summer (DST): UTC+02:00 (CEST)
- Postal codes: 25917
- Dialling codes: 04662
- Vehicle registration: NF
- Website: www.amt- karrharde.de

Stadum is a municipality in the district of Nordfriesland, in Schleswig-Holstein, Germany.

== Notable people ==
Rock musician Rio Reiser and his band Ton Steine Scherben moved to a farmstead at Fresenhagen in Stadum in 1975. Reiser lived there until his death in 1996. He was also buried on the farm under a special permit provided by Minister President Heide Simonis.

== Bundeswehr SIGINT station ==
SIGINT station north (Fernmeldeaufklärungszentrale NORD) in Stadum is one of two HF SIGINT stations of Bundeswehr. The station is opearting a Wullenweber-Antenna-array („Kastagnette“) since 1989 for the shortwave spectrum. Bundeswerh is intercepting military radio transmission via this system.
