= Ute Freudenberg =

German rock, schlager and pop music singe

Ute Freudenberg (born January 12, 1956, in Schöndorf, (a district in Weimar), Thuringia, then part of East Germany; temporary stage name Heather Jones) is a German rock, schlager and pop music singer. She achieved considerable success in East Germany in the 1970s and early 1980s. And she had a major musical breakthrough in 1980 with the rock band Elefant with the song Jugendliebe, which is one of the "classics of GDR rock and pop history".

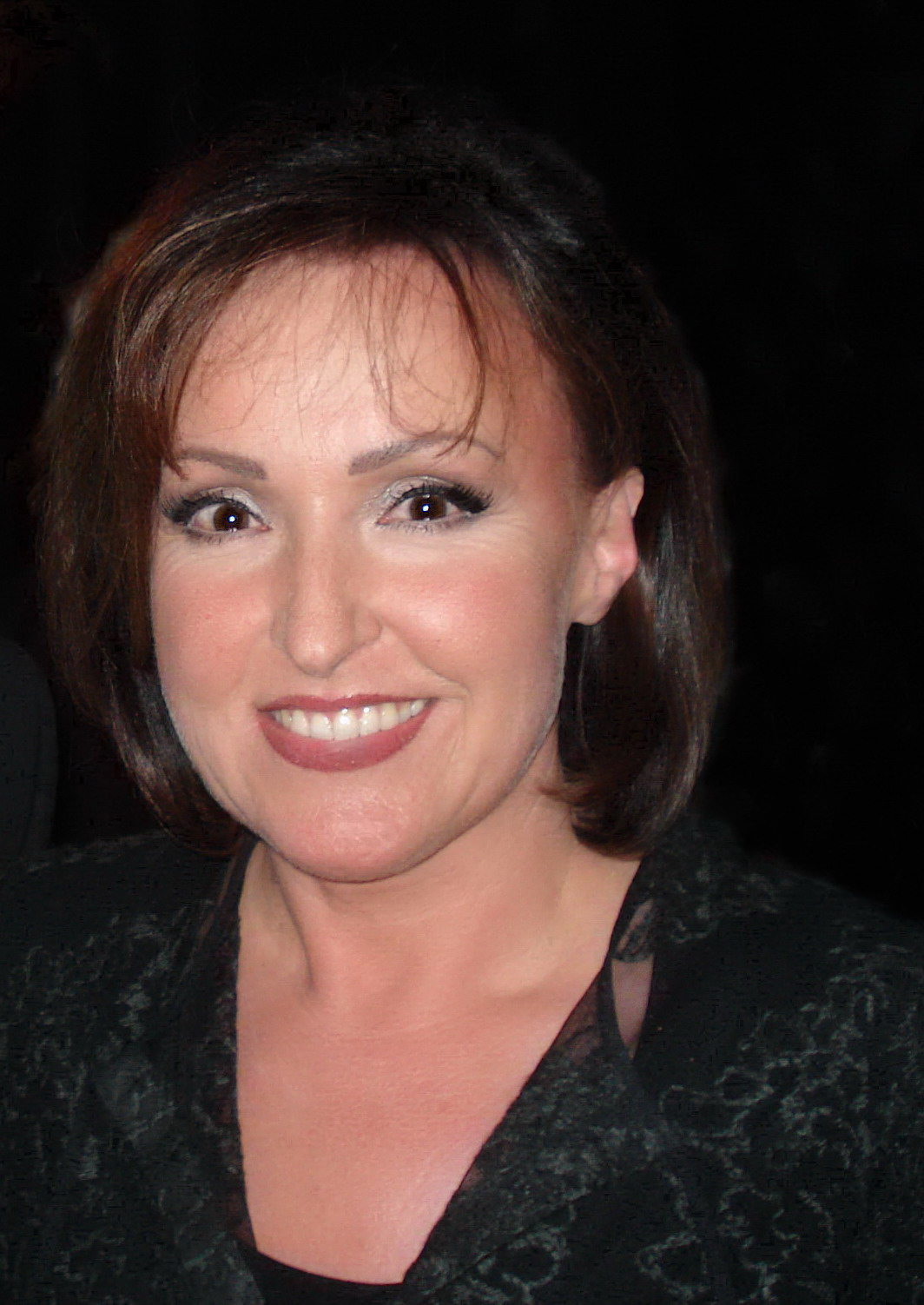
Ute Freudenberg at the Goldenen Henne Ceremony, 2009

== Life and work ==
In 1975 Freudenberg won the GDR's Best Emerging Artist Award at the Chansontagen. In the following year, she was a founding member of the rock band Elefant, which released two LPs and twelve singles. She remained active with the group until 1984. Her breakthrough came in 1980 with the joint single Jugendliebe, which later became one of the "classics of GDR rock and pop history". Other hits from the GDR era were Wie weit ist es bis ans Ende dieser Welt? [How far is it to the end of this world?], Und wieder wird ein Mensch geboren [And again a human being is born] and Es gibt für mich kein fremdes Leid [There is no other suffering for me] in a duet with Wolfgang Ziegler. From 1980 to 1984 she was voted the most popular singer in the GDR four times.

In 1984 she did not return to the GDR after a television appearance on the Aktuelle Schaubude in Hamburg. She moved to Düsseldorf, worked as a studio singer and performed in the Netherlands and on cruise ships. In 1988, under the stage name Heather Jones, she sang the theme song This was the last time for the Tatort TV series episode Bankrupt Geier. In 1990 the single Ein Tag wie heut was released, the German version of the Whitney Houston hit One Moment in Time. In 1994 her album Und da fragst Du noch. was released. From 1994 to 1996 Ute Freudenberg appeared in many television programs.

=== Since 2000 ===
Together with Christian Lais, Ute Freudenberg in 2016 released Lebenslinien [Life Lines], a socially critical album which deals with topics such as humanity ("For the peace of our time").

== Bibliography ==
- Biographical entry, Biographische Angaben aus dem Handbuch "Wer war wer in der DDR?" [Who Was Who in East Germany]. Bundesstiftung zur Aufarbeitung der SED-Diktatur. Ute Freudenberg. Retrieved October 8, 2026.
- Christine Dähn, Ute Freudenberg: Jugendliebe – Die Biografie. Verlag Neues Leben, Berlin 2012, ISBN 978-3-355-01794-7.
