= Motherfuckers GMBH & Co KG =

Studio album by Xhol
- Released: 1972
- Recorded: 1970
- Genre: Krautrock, progressive rock
- Length: 40:40
- Label: Ohr
- Producer: None credited

Xhol chronology
Electrip (1969)	Motherfuckers GMBH & Co KG (1972)

Motherfuckers GMBH & Co KG is the third and final studio album by the German band Xhol Caravan, an influential member of the krautrock music movement who were by this time known simply as Xhol. Originally recorded in 1970, the album was released roughly two years later, just as the band was dissolving due to creative differences with their label, Ohr. As is typical of krautrock, the music of Motherfuckers features elements of progressive rock, free jazz, fusion, and sound experimentation. The album has been re-released several times, most recently in 2008 by Wah-Wah Records Sound.

== Critical reception ==
Allmusic rated the album 4.5 out of 5 stars and describes it as "Spanning free jazz, psychedelic and progressive rock ... an intense work of creative, mind-warped music."

== Track listing ==
No.	Title	Length
1.	"Radio"	2:30
2.	"Leistungsprinzip"	1:30
3.	"Orgelsolo"	9:26
4.	"Side 1 First Day"	7:05
5.	"Grille"	6:58
6.	"Love Potion 25"	13:11
Total length:		40:40

== Personnel ==
- Skip van Wyck – drums
- Tim Belbe – saxophone
- Klaus Briest – bass
- Öcki Brevert – keyboards
- Hansi Fischer – flute, sax
