= Limbus =

Limbus (Lat. "edge, boundary") may refer to:

- Corneal limbus, the border of the cornea and the sclera (the white of the eye)
- Limbus of fossa ovalis, in the heart
- Limbus 3 and Limbus 4, two line-ups of a German avant-garde musical group
- Limbus, a type of garment trim added to the stola in Ancient Rome
- Limbus Company, a 2023 video game

== See also ==
- Limbo, a speculative idea about the afterlife condition of those who die in original sin without being assigned to the Hell of the Damned in Catholic theology (referring to the "edge" of Hell)
- Limbu people, an ethnic group in Nepal and India
- Limbum language, a language of Cameroon
