= IV (Ton Steine Scherben album) =

Studio album by Ton Steine Scherben
- Released: March 1981
- Recorded: David Volksmund Studio, Fresenhagen, Germany
- Genre: German rock
- Length: 90:56
- Label: David Volksmund
- Producer: Ton Steine Scherben

Ton Steine Scherben chronology
Wenn die Nacht am tiefsten… (1975)	IV (1981)	Scherben (1983)

IV is a double album released by Ton Steine Scherben. Because of the black album cover, it is also referred to as die Schwarze ("the black one"). It is a collection of various influences from folk to punk and marks a departure from the band's earlier work, even though it continues the change that began with the previous album Wenn die Nacht am tiefsten.... Anarchist slogans such as "destroy what destroys you" or "no power for nobody" are no longer prevalent, although some of the songs are political, such as "Der Turm stürzt ein" ("The tower is collapsing").

== Tarot Cards ==
All the songs on the album aside from "Morgenlicht" were composed with the aid of Tarot cards from the Major Arcana. The so-called "Tarot secret" was not revealed until years after Rio Reiser's death, as it was worried that the magic of the innovative and sometimes very different texts would be lost. Most of the text is composed of images and metaphors; very little is unambiguous. After all the living participants in the process agreed, the following list of tarot cards was offered from the year 1980:

- January 22 - The Devil: This led to the song "Heimweh" ("Homesickness"), which was also the working title of the album. Every band member contributed to the text of the song, which was then finished by Hannes Eyber and Rio Reiser. The chords were chosen at random and the rhythm follows a "magical" number series.
- February 12 - The World: "Sumpf Schlock" ("Swamp Schlock"). The text was composed by the group in a similar manner to Heimweh. "Harikafulas" comes from the first two letters of the band members' names (Hannes - Rio - Kai - Funky - Lanrue).
- The Star: This card led to the song "Vorübergehend geschlossen" ("Temporarily closed"). Hannes Eyber wrote largely incomprehensible lyrics which were then electronically distorted on the album to the point of incomprehensibility. (In a remixed version released much later the lyrics can be made out.) The music is also written to sound alien. The idea behind it was that nobody can grasp the stars.
- The Chariot: "Kleine Freuden" ("Small joys") was composed by the group.
- March 27 - The Hermit: "Wiedersehen" - A hermit seeks a way to return to the world. The lyrics are a mostly alphabetic listing of first names.
- March 31 - Temperance: The song "S'is eben so" ("That's just the way it is") was written through collaboration from the whole band.
- June 4 - The Magician: "Wie in den Tagen Midians" ("As in the days of Midian") consists of a listing of then-current sites of wars, battles, and violent acts, as well as the capitals of war-waging states, as well as a children's choir singing a bible verse (Isaiah 9:5); the title of the song originates in the previous verse (Isaiah 9:4).
- June 7 - The Empress: Inspired in part by the book Letter to a Child Never Born by Oriana Fallaci, this resulted in the song "Bleib wo du bist" ("Stay where you are").
- June 10 - The Tower: Because the card depicts a tower being struck by lightning, Rio wrote the song "Der Turm stürzt ein" ("The tower is collapsing") that humorously mentions social problems.
- June 13 - Judgement: R. P. S. Lanrue suggested his composition "Morgenlicht" ("Morning light"), whose lyrics were written by Rainer von der Marwitz, the bartender of the Berlin gay bar "Anderes Ufer", and which had been used in a previous production. Parts of this song are referenced in "Matth. XI, 15" on Rio Reiser's solo album Über Alles.
- June 17 - The High Priestess: the narcissistic song "Niemand liebt mich" ("Nobody loves me"), as a musical lament of the High Priestess.
- June 18 - The Moon: "Ebbe und Flut" ("Ebb and flood"), a reference to the moon's influence on the tides.
- June 20 - The Hanged Man (Tarot card): The card depicts a man hanged upside-down by his foot. Funky Götzner, who wrote the lyrics, allowed himself to be hanged upside down and got the idea for the song "S.N.A.F.T.". The title is a misspelling of Sanft, meaning "gentle".
- June 23 - The Hierophant: "(Auf ein) Happy-End" ("(for a) happy ending") was written as a gospel-style final song with a female chorus.
- June 26 - The Fool: "Da!" ("There!").
- June 28 - The Emperor: "Gold", a straightforward association.
- October 24 - Wheel of Fortune: "Jenseits von Eden" ("East of Eden"), one of the group's best-known songs.
- October 25 - The Lovers: "Der Fremde aus Indien" ("The stranger from India"), a song written without using the letter "e". The title is borrowed from a novel by Karl May.
- October 25 - Death: The lyrics to "Filmkuß" ("Movie kiss") make more sense when interpreted in light of the card e.g. "Wie ein Filmkuß – zeitenlos. Du bist so einfach. Ende." ("Like a movie kiss – timeless. You are so simple. End.")
- October 26 - Justice: "Ich hab nix" ("I've got nothing").
- October 26 - The Sun: "Kribbel Krabbel" ("Tingling and Crawling"). The final verse is sung in Italian.
- October 27 - Strength: "Alles ist richtig" ("Everything is right") was written while the group was pressed for time and was completed overnight.

== Four lyricists and three composers ==
The Tarot cards were also used to assign different tasks for each song, i.e. who wrote the lyrics and composed the music. This was the first time the drummer Funky Götzner wrote lyrics for the group and the first time the bassist Kai Sichtermann composed the music, who had previously been uninvolved. Hannes Eyber, a friend of the band, also contributed lyrics. The song Morgenlicht was not written in connection with a tarot card as it was written in 1978 for the theater group "Transplantis"; the text was written by Rainer von der Marwitz. Earlier albums were co-written by R. P. S. Lanrue and Rio Reiser; this album's diversity and creativity can be attributed to the much larger songwriting team.

== Musical experiments ==
An additional component of the album was the musical variety used in production. Several guest musicians were invited for the recordings: Jörg Schlotterer, a former band member, returned to play trombone and flute; Wolfgang Seidel – the group's first drummer – returned to play percussion under the pseudonym Wolf Sequenza; Klaus van Velzen played saxophone. A youth choir from Niebüll was also used for the song Wie in den Tagen Midians. Members of the band also played using less common instruments, such as the hammered dulcimer.

== Song listing ==
=== Disc 1 ===
1. Jenseits von Eden (Rio Reiser, R. P. S. Lanrue) – 6:07
2. Bleib wo du bist (Reiser) – 2:40
3. Sumpf Schlock (Hannes Eyber, Lanrue) – 5:10
4. Der Turm stürzt ein (Reiser) – 4:26
5. Wie in den Tagen Midians (Reiser, Lanrue) – 2:57
6. Vorübergehend geschlossen (Eyber, Lanrue) – 2:37
7. Ebbe und Flut (Funky K. Götzner, Reiser) – 2:22
8. Filmkuß (Eyber, Reiser) – 3:19
9. Der Fremde aus Indien (Götzner, Lanrue) – 5:05
10. Kleine Freuden (Eyber, Lanrue) – 6:43
11. Heimweh (Eyber, Lanrue) – 5:01

=== Disc 2 ===
1. Alles ist richtig (Eyber, Kai Sichtermann) – 3:16
2. S'is eben so (Reiser) – 3:16
3. S.N.A.F.T. (Götzner, Sichtermann) – 2:40
4. Kribbel Krabbel (Eyber, Sichtermann) – 3:51
5. Niemand liebt mich (Eyber, Lanrue) – 3:27
6. Da! (Eyber, Reiser) – 4:28
7. Morgenlicht (Rainer von der Marwitz, Lanrue) – 5:12
8. Ich hab nix (Eyber, Reiser) – 2:35
9. Gold (Götzner, Lanrue) – 6:42
10. Wiedersehen (Reiser, Lanrue) – 3:33
11. (Auf ein) Happy End (Reiser, Sichtermann) – 5:29

== See also ==
- Major Arcana
