= Bruits et Temps Analogues =

Bruits et Temps Analogues is an album by French musician Patrick Vian, his only solo album.

Bruits was released on the Egg label in 1976, which was owned by Barclay Records and designed to present young and innovative musicians (it had Vangelis and Tim Blake under contract). It was re-released in 1978, on the Movieplay label, and it was re-released on CD by the German Staubgold label.

== Track list ==
- Side A:
1. Sphère (6:10) (B. Lavialle)
2. Grosse Nacht Musik (5:05)
3. Oreknock (6:45)
4. Old Vienna (2:10)
- Side B:
1. R & B Degenerit! (6:10)
2. Barong Rouge (4:10)
3. Tunnel 4, Red Noise (4:30)
4. Bad Blue (1:56)
5. Tricentennial Drag (2:20)

== Musicians ==
- Patrick Vian – Moog IIc and ARP 2600 synthesizers, sequencer, piano
- Mino Cinelu – drums, percussion
- George Granier – Fender Rhodes, marimba
- Bernard Lavialle – guitar

== Production ==
- Produced by Jerome Laperrousaz
- Recorded at Studio I.P., Paris, by George Granier, assisted by Alain Marcel

== Artwork ==
- G. Lacroix – front cover (illustration)
- Millie – back cover (photograph)
