= Rauch-Haus-Song =

1972 song by Ton Steine Scherben

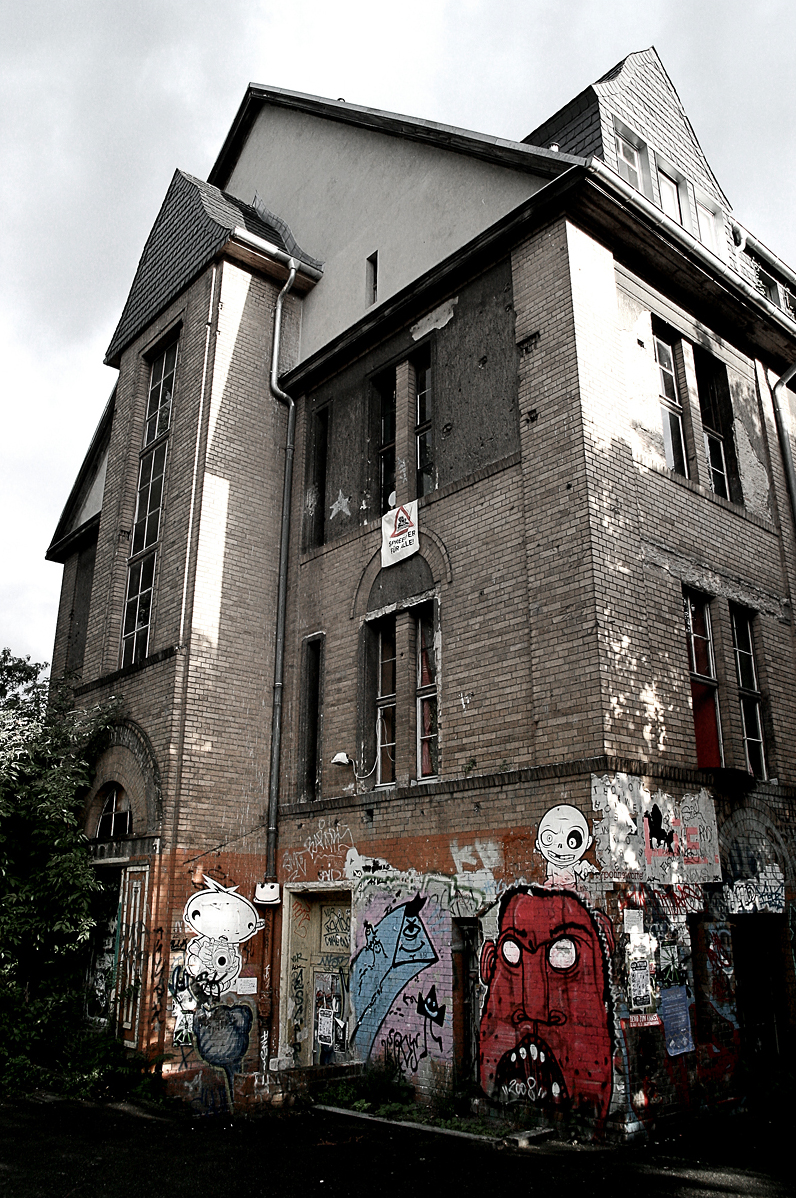
Georg-von-Rauch Haus in 2008

Occupied building hung with a banner bearing the slogan "...das ist UNSER haus" ("... this is OUR house")

The "Rauch-Haus-Song" is a track performed by West Berlin band Ton Steine Scherben on their second studio album Keine Macht für Niemand. It has become famous in leftwing circles in Germany.

== Background ==
The double album Keine Macht für Niemand ('No power for no-one') was released in 1972 by rock band Ton Steine Scherben. The track "Rauch-Haus-Song" describes the scenes when the police attempted to evict the squatted Georg-von-Rauch-Haus in December 1971. Members of the band were involved in the squat and were present when the police attacked. A derelict nurses' dormitory, part of the former Bethanien hospital, had been occupied in early 1971. It was one of the first buildings to be squatted in Berlin. The squatters had renamed the building Georg-von-Rauch-Haus after Georg von Rauch, a leftist who was shot dead by the police on 5 December 1971. The police action was unsuccessful and the Georg-von-Rauch-Haus remains in existence almost fifty years later. Within the German squatter movement, the "Rauch-Haus-Song" became an anthem, with the refrain "Das ist unser Haus" (This is our house) being shouted out as a motto.

== Excerpt ==
R:Und wir schreien's laut:
Ihr kriegt uns hier nicht raus!
Das ist unser Haus, schmeißt doch endlich
Schmidt und Press und Mosch aus Kreuzberg raus.

(Refrain:) And we shout it loud:
You won't get us out!
This is our house,
At long last kick Schmidt and Press and Mosch out of Kreuzberg.

== Covers ==
WestBam published a remix on Pop 2001 - Geschichte wird gemacht in 2001.
