= Lord Cromwell Plays Suite For Seven Vices =

Studio album by Opus Avantra
- Released: 1975
- Genres: Progressive rock, experimental music, Italian progressive rock
- Label: Artis Records

Opus Avantra chronology
Introspezione (1974)	Lord Cromwell Plays Suite For Seven Vices (1975)	Strata (1989)

Lord Cromwell Plays Suite For Seven Vices is the second studio album by the Italian progressive rock band Opus Avantra, released in 1975.

It's a concept album about the seven deadly sins (in the order they appear pride, avarice, lust, anger, gluttony, envy, sloth) with the addition of an eighth "vice" autobiographical (My deputy), the search for a solution of irreconcilable opposites (good and evil, light and dark, avant-garde and tradition).

The work was composed entirely of Alfredo Tisocco and interpreted by the artist himself, assisted by an ensemble of six elements (Luciano Tavella on flute, Renato Zanella on electric guitar, Enrico Professione and Pieregidio Spiller on violin, Riccardo Perraro on cello and Paolo Siani on percussions and drums) plus four voices (Gina Bianco, Susan Worsham, Cindy Brasher and Carl Adams, the American Chorus Setaf). What emerges is the extraordinary Tisocco's ability to explore the most remote recesses of the keyboard (as well as a piano, synth and organ), with solutions ranging avantgarde (references to futurist music and experimental music) and tradition (classical music) as well as the name of the band suggests.

== Track listing ==
1. Flowers on Pride - 5:29
2. Avarice - 5:27
3. Lust - 3:54
4. My Vice - 2:00
5. Ira - 7:53
6. Gluttony - 3:05
7. Envy - 5:45
8. Sloth - 4:32
9. Allemanda - 3:03
