= Hau-RUK =

Live album by Xhol (aka Xhol Caravan)
- Released: 1971
- Genre: Krautrock, progressive rock, free jazz, jazz fusion
- Length: 66:28 (originally 44:33)
- Label: Ohr
- Producer: Xhol

Hau-RUK is a live album by the German band Xhol Caravan, an influential member of the krautrock music movement. By the time of this release, they were known simply as Xhol. The album was recorded in 1970 and released in 1971. The original release contained only two tracks, recorded live on July 1 and 2, 1970 in Göttingen, Germany. A re-release of the album on CD in 2002 by the Garden of Delights label contains an additional track, "Süden Twi Westen," recorded in the studio at some point subsequent to the band's initial breakup in 1972. As with most of Xhol Caravan's work, particularly their live performances, the music consists of extended progressive rock, free jazz, fusion, and improvisational forays.

== Critical reception ==
On Allmusic.com, Hau-RUK rates 3.5 out of 5 stars, and the original, two-track release is described as "...two sidelong jams of loose free-form improvisation...a very good release by this excellent underground Krautrock band."

== Track listing ==
No.	Title	Length
1.	"Breit"	24:13
2.	"Schaukel"	20:20
3.	"Süden Twi Westen"	21:55
Total length:		66:28

== Personnel ==
- Bass – Klaus Briest
- Drums – Skip Van Wyck
- Keyboards – Öcki Brevern
- Saxophone – Tim Belbe
