= Get in High =

Studio album by Soul Caravan
- Released: 1967
- Recorded: Studio Walldorf, December 20, 1967
- Genre: Soul, psychedelic soul, blues
- Length: 43:08
- Label: CBS Records
- Producer: Fritz Rau, Horst Lippmann

Soul Caravan chronology
Get in High (1967)	Electrip (1969)

Get in High is the first of three studio albums by the German group Xhol Caravan (then known as Soul Caravan), an influential band in the krautrock music movement. The album was recorded and released in 1967. The band's only studio album to feature James Rhodes and Ronnie Swinson on lead vocals, Get in High represents Xhol Caravan's original intent to be a blues/jazz fusion band, and features covers of such blues and R&B standards as “Shotgun” and “Land of a Thousand Dances.” Even so, the album does feature moments of the krautrock sound that would define the band's later studio albums and their live sound after Rhodes and Swinson left the band. Originally released on CBS Records in vinyl only, the album has not yet been repackaged for digital release.

== Track listing ==
No.	Title	Writer(s)	Length
1.	"So Much Soul"	Rhodes, Henry Gaines	3:09
2.	"Hey, Hey, Hey, What’s This You’re Doin’, Baby"	Gaines	2:35
3.	"Memories"	Rhodes	3:30
4.	"Booking Up"	Rhodes, Van Wyck, Belbe	2:31
5.	"Get in High/Shotgun"	Rhodes, Swinson/Autry DeWalt	5:50
6.	"Hold On, Baby"	Gaines	2:24
7.	"African Song"	Rhodes, Swinson	4:05
8.	"Just A Fantasy"	Rhodes, Fischer	4:14
9.	"Land of 1,000 Dances"	Chris Kenner	4:10
10.	"She is My Baby"	Gaines	2:56
11.	"Psychedelic Soul"	Gaines, Belbe	5:13
Total length:			43:08

== Personnel ==
- James Rhodes - vocals
- Ronnie Swinson - vocals
- Tim Belbe - saxophone
- Hansi Fischer - saxophone
- Klaus Briest - bass
- Werner Funk - guitar
- Skip van Wyck - drums
