= Opus Avantra =

- Origin: Veneto, Italy
- Genres: Progressive rock, Italian progressive rock, Experimental music
- Years active: 1974-1995

Opus Avantra is an Italian band which combines different genres. It is sometimes classified as Italian progressive rock and avant-prog. The band is on the Nurse With Wound list, and have released a concept album.

== Biography ==
The Opus Avantra were formed in Veneto in 1973 by a group composed of soprano Donella Del Monaco, the niece of the tenor Mario Del Monaco (concept, voice and text), pianist-composer Alfredo Tisocco (direction ensemble, music, piano and keyboards ), the philosopher Giorgio Bisotto (ideologist and inspirer) and producer Renato Marengo.

With the collaboration of many guest musicians, they released their first album in 1974, Opus Avantra - Donella Del Monaco (better known as Introspezione, the title of the first track) for the Trident label and the following year Lord Cromwell Plays Suite For Seven Vices (Artis Records label).

The name is divided into three parts and is derived from their main interests: OPUS (opera) AVAN (avantgarde) and TRA (tradition). The name sums up the group's ideology that intends to become a movement of avant-garde music, however, has its roots in the study and recovery of tradition: innovation, that is, considered to be essential as a contemporary language, can not be opposed to the tradition, but rather stems from its review and reinterpretation current.

Opus Avantra in overcoming the various "genres" and "styles" music is inspired by the fields of symphonic pop and from ethnic music, the song as well as from contemporary jazz, from experimental music and from the alea and searching for a common thread, however, a sense of "rock in opposition". The Opus Avantra this sense was a precursor of movements borderline or fusion.

The Opus Avantra's albums from Introspezione to Strata are now regularly reprinted in Japan (Japanese label Strange Days) and the success that these issues have received over the years in this country has suggested the three founders (Donella Del Monaco, Alfredo Tisocco and Giorgio Bisotto) to organize a tour in the East.

The group, after a preview in Bucharest, Romania (the theater Arcub March 20) made its debut in Tokyo at the famous City Club April 12, 2008.

The new ensemble is formed by: Donella Del Monaco (vocals), Alfredo Tisocco (keyboards), George Bisotto (Magister Tenebrarum), Mauro Hammer (flutes), Valerio Galla (drums) The Opus String Ensemble (two violins, viola, cello electrified). Have made all the songs of Introspezione, and a selection of songs from the other three albums, Lord Cromwell (1975), Strata (1989) and Lyrics (1995).

== Concept album ==
Their 1975 record Lord Cromwell Plays Suite For Seven Vices is a concept album about the Seven Deadly Sins, each track being a musical representation of a particular vice. It was performed live in Japan in 2008.

== Formation ==
The band's singer, Donella Del Monaco, is the niece of Mario Del Monaco. The composer and keyboardist is Alfredo Tisocco, who has also had a solo career At some point, Paolo Siani from the band Italian progressive rock group Nuova Idea was a member.

== Discography ==
=== Studio albums ===
- 1974 - Introspezione
- 1975 - Lord Cromwell Plays Suite For Seven Vices
- 1989 - Strata
- 1995 - Lyrics
- 2003 - Venetia Et Anima

=== Live albums ===
- 2003 - Live Concert Excerpts

=== Collections ===
- 2002 - Opus Magnum (4CD collection including solo work by Alfredo Tisocco)
- 2003 - Omega (4CD collection including solo work by Alfredo Tisocco)

=== Singles ===
- 1974 - Il pavone/Ah doleur
- 1975 - Allemanda/Flowers on Pride

== See also ==
- Italian progressive rock
- List of concept albums
- Avantgarde music
- Experimental music
