= Macht kaputt, was euch kaputt macht =

1970 song by Ton Steine Scherben

"Macht kaputt, was euch kaputt macht" ("Destroy What Destroys You") is a 1970 song by German proto-punk band Ton Steine Scherben and a subsequent political slogan. Written in 1969, it first appeared as a single the next year, followed by the band's 1971 debut album Warum geht es mir so dreckig? The slogan was subsequently used in the German autonomous, squatting, and contemporary anarchist outgrowths of the 1960s West German student movement.

== Background ==
The song was originally written for the 1969 play Rita und Paul by Hoffmanns Comic Teater. It followed a scene in which the titular hero, the young worker Paul, sees conservative commentator Matthias Walden on television and throws the TV set on the floor in anger.

The lyrics were written by Norbert Krause, a member of Hoffmanns Comic Teater, inspired by lyrics by Rio Reiser: "Bombs are falling / Tanks are rolling / Soldiers dying / Men are crying / It is a good time ...". These lyrics were inspired in turn by Bob Dylan's "Subterranean Homesick Blues". The song also includes a full rendition of the Einheitsfrontlied, a well-known 1930s labour movement song. In 1970 the members of what would later become Ton Steine Scherben split off with the apprentice collective Rote Steine from Hoffmanns Comic Teater; the first piece by Rote Steine was also called Macht kaputt, was euch kaputt macht.

In mid-1970, ARD broadcast a documentary entitled Fünf Finger sind eine Faust ("Five fingers make a fist") about the aims of the APO. It was accompanied by songs by the then still nameless Rote Steine band, including "Macht kaputt, was euch kaputt macht" and "Wir streiken" ("We're on strike"), also from Rita und Paul. Viewers called the station to ask how to buy the music. R. P. S. Lanrue, Rio Reiser, Wolfgang Seidel, and Kai Sichtermann, having named themselves "Ton Steine Scherben", recorded a single with these two songs. By Christmas 1970 it had already sold over 6000 copies.

== Love and Peace Festival ==
The band's first performance was on September 6, 1970, at the Fehmarn Love and Peace Festival. By the time they took the stage (the stage on which Jimi Hendrix had just given his last concert), the organizers had already left, taking the proceeds of the box office with them. Reiser called on the audience to "smash the organizers into the ground". By the time they played "Macht kaputt, was euch kaputt macht", their third song, the office was set on fire; two songs later, the stage was burning too. Many people believed that Ton Steine Scherben had set the stage on fire, which gave them tremendous credibility in the radical scene.

== Legacy ==
In 1971, the song appeared on the album Warum geht es mir so dreckig?. It became one of the best-known of Ton Steine Scherben's songs. The title soon became a motto for the protests of the 1970s and was used on all kinds of fliers and graffiti.

The song "Repariert, was Euch kaputt macht!" ("Fix what breaks you!") (2007) from the album of the same name by Tommy Finke is a reference to "Macht kaputt, was euch kaputt macht" and Rio Reiser, whose "Stiller Raum" is also alluded to. "Destroy What Destroys You", by German thrash metal band Kreator, is also a reference to "Macht kaputt, was euch kaputt macht". The song was released on the Hordes of Chaos album in 2008.
