= Electrip =

Studio album by Xhol Caravan
- Released: 1969
- Genre: Krautrock, progressive rock
- Length: 40:34
- Label: Hansa Records

Xhol Caravan chronology
| Get in High (1967) | Electrip (1969) | Motherfuckers GmbH & Co. KG (1972) |

Electrip is the second of three studio albums by the German band Xhol Caravan, an influential member of the krautrock music movement. The album was recorded and released in 1969, and marks a significant departure from the band’s debut effort, 1967’s Get in High. While that album spotlighted the American blues origins of then-singers Ronnie Swinson and James Rhodes, by 1969 Rhodes and Swinson were gone and so were pop and blues conventions. On Electrip, these are abandoned in favor of extended forays into progressive rock, free jazz, fusion, improvisation, and experimentation. Originally released on Hansa Records, the album was repackaged and rereleased in 2000 on the Garden of Delights label.

== Critical reception ==
On Allmusic, Electrip was rated 4.5 out of 5 stars and is described as "a classic of early Krautrock, a uniquely German twist that took rock & roll into new realms, and the record was a blueprint for the many German jazz-rock groups that followed."

== Track listing ==
| No. | Title | Length |
|---|---|---|
| 1. | "Electric Fun Fair" | 6:29 |
| 2. | "Pop Games" | 6:54 |
| 3. | "All Green" | 7:41 |
| 4. | "Raise Up High" | 17:02 |
| 5. | "Walla Mashalla" | 2:28 |
| Total length: | | 40:34 |

== Personnel ==
- Skip van Wyk – drums
- Tim Belbe – saxophone
- Klaus Briest – bass
- Öcki Brevert – keyboards
- Hansi Fischer – flute, sax
- Peter Meisel – noises
