= Patrick Vian =

French musician (1942–2023)

- Born: 12 April 1942; Paris, France
- Origin: Angoulême, France
- Died: 24 February 2023 (aged 80) Apt, Vaucluse, France
- Genres: Rock, Electronic music
- Instruments: Guitar; Vocals; Piano; Synthesizer
- Years active: 1968–1976
- Label: Egg
- Formerly of: Red Noise
- Website: http://www.rednoise.fr/

Patrick Alain Vian (12 April 1942 – 24 February 2023) was a French musician. He played progressive rock music in the late 1960s with the band Red Noise, which recorded one album. In the 1970s, he composed music for a film and released one solo album, Bruits et Temps Analogues, in 1976.

== Biography ==
Patrick Vian was born on 12 April 1942 in Paris. Raised in Angoulême, he was the son of French jazz trumpeter and poet Boris Vian. His father, who died when he was 17, nicknamed him "Bisonnot", "little bison". He was born during World War II and had a turbulent childhood in various places after his parents divorced, spending a long period of time in England and going to boarding school in Switzerland.

Vian first gained notability as a guitar player with the progressive rock band Red Noise (which was associated with Ame Son); the band formed at the Sorbonne in 1968, and played its first show during the occupation of the university. According to Vian, these were exciting times: he later commented that in Red Noise's early days, "their concerts wouldn't end until the cops came." The band released one album, Sarcelles - Lochères, in 1970. The group broke up after they got arrested for possession of hash in the Netherlands. Given the revolutionary times, the band split rather appropriately into a socialist and a Trotskyist section, the latter of which continued under the name Komintern. Sarcelles - Lochères was released on LP in 1970, and re-released on CD by Futura Records in 1996.

In 1975, he composed some of the music for the film Hu-Man (starring Jeanne Moreau and Terence Stamp) by Jérôme Laperrousaz. In 1976, he recorded a solo album, Bruits et Temps Analogues, on the Egg label, which was owned by Barclay Records and designed to present young and innovative musicians (it had Vangelis and Tim Blake under contract). He is included (like Ame Son, Komintern and Red Noise) on the Nurse with Wound list.

From 1976, little was heard of Vian, though he gave an interview to L'Express in 2011, in which he talked at length about his father and his childhood. In 2013, he again appeared in public for the opening of L'Écume des jours, the 2013 movie based on his father's novel of the same name.

Vian later lived in Apt, Vaucluse, where he died on 24 February 2023, at the age of 80.
