= Xhol Caravan =

Germany Krautrock band

- Origin: Germany
- Genre: Krautrock
- Years active: 1967–1972
- Labels: CBS Records, Hansa Records, Ohr/Metronome Records
- Past members: James Rhodes; Ronnie Swinson; Tim Belbe; Gerhardt Egmont "Öcki" Von Brevern; Hansi Fischer; Werner Funk; Gilbert "Skip" van Wyck III; Klaus Briest

Xhol Caravan, known first as Soul Caravan and later as Xhol, was one of the first bands to participate in the so-called Krautrock movement in Germany in the late 1960s. Their music draws from varied influences and fuses rhythm and blues and free jazz with a psychedelic rock sensibility.

== History ==
=== Soul Caravan ===
The band was formed in Wiesbaden, Germany in early 1967 by three Germans (Tim Belbe on saxophone; Hansi Fischer on saxophone & flute; Klaus Briest on bass guitar) and three Americans (Gilbert 'Skip' van Wyck on drums and singers James Rhodes and Ronnie Swinson). Early concerts consisted mostly of cover versions of American soul artists, such as Otis Redding and James Brown, but the band soon began to rely almost entirely on its own material.

After adding Werner Funk on guitar, the band's first studio album, Get in High, appeared on the German CBS label in December 1967. It exemplified the band's early soul sound, and featured a remake of the classic American soul tune "Shotgun" along with original compositions that incorporated African-American themes and elements, including "Kerd-I-Wai (African Song)" and "So Much Soul." The live recordings Soul Caravan: Live 1969, Altena 1969, and Xhol 1970 spotlight this R&B sound, while also including improvisational pieces more indicative of the band's later period, stretching in some cases well beyond 25 minutes in length. (The "Freedom Opera," for instance, heard on the 2001 Motherfuckers Live album but recorded in 1969, clocks in at nearly 50 minutes.)

The political disturbances of 1968 were reflected in the band's move towards a more jazzy, psychedelic sound and a change of name to Xhol Caravan. Swinson left the band and returned to the United States at about this time.

=== Xhol Caravan ===
Organist Gerhardt Egmont "Öcki" Von Brevern joined at the start of 1969 as the band moved away from soul and towards a more jazzy sound. Rhodes left in August 1969, as did Funk, leaving the band without a guitarist. Skip van Wyck took over vocal duties. The band's second album, Electrip, reflected the move away from R&B, fusing free jazz and psychedelic rock with a satirical, sometimes X-rated sense of humor, as well as studio manipulation of sounds and timbres.

=== Xhol ===
After Electrip, the band released two more albums, both on the small Ohr label and both with the band name reduced to Xhol, partly to avoid confusion with the British Canterbury Scene group Caravan. Fischer left to join Embryo in 1970, because he was unhappy with what he saw as a move away from fresh compositions towards drug-fuelled improvisation. This reduced the band to a quartet of Belbe, Öcki, van Wyck, and Briest.

The 1970 album Hau-RUK contained two 20-minute-plus improvisations recorded live in a German bar earlier that year. Xhol's last LP, Motherfuckers GmbH & Co. KG, consists of several pieces recorded more or less live in the studio. Recorded in 1970, the album would not be released until 1972 due to creative differences between Xhol's members and Ohr label boss Ralf-Ulrich Kaiser. These differences even influenced the packaging of the album: although Ohr/Metronome usually lavished great care on the sleeves for its records—commissioning custom artwork with glossy lamination and gatefolds for even single LPs—the sleeve for MF consisted merely of hand-scrawled text on a box containing the master recordings of the album.

The band dissolved in April 1972. Some fresh recordings were made in 1974 by Belbe, Öcki, van Wyck, and Fischer, one of which was eventually released as a bonus track on the CD issue of Hau-RUK. Belbe, Fischer, and Briest played reunion concerts in the late 1990s and early 2000s before Belbe's death in August 2004.

== Members ==
- Tim Belbe, saxophones
- Gilbert "Skip" van Wyck III, drums and percussion
- Klaus Briest, bass guitar
- Hansi Fischer, flutes and saxophones (1967–70)
- Gerhardt Egmont "Öcki" Von Brevern, Hammond organ (1969–72)
- James Rhodes, vocals (1967–69)
- Ronnie Swinson, vocals (1967–68)
- Werner Funk, electric guitar (1967–69)

== Discography ==
=== Studio albums ===
- 1967 Get in High (as Soul Caravan), CBS Records S 63268
- 1969 Electrip, Hansa Records 80 099 AU, Garden of Delights CD-045 (2000)
- 1972 Motherfuckers GmbH & Co. KG, recorded 1970, Ohr OMM 556.024, Wah-Wah Records Sound LPS-054 (2008)

=== Live albums ===
- 1971 Hau-RUK, recordings from July 1970, Ohr 56014, Garden of Delights CD-076 (with an additional studio track "Süden Twi Westen")
- 2001 Motherfuckers Live, recordings from 1969 with bonus disc of additional radio and live material, United Durtro UDOR 5/6/7CD
- 2006 Soul Caravan: Live 1969, Garden of Delights CD-115
- 2006 Altena 1969, Garden of Delights CD-116
- 2006 Altena 1970, Garden of Delights CD-117
- 2009 Essen 1970, Garden of Delights CD-152
- 2019 Scream of Joy (2019 reunion), Garden of Delights CD-186
- 2022 Hamburg 1969, Garden of Delights CD-194

=== DVDs ===
- 2005 Xhol Caravan: Talking to My Soul, live televised performances from 1970, Garden of Delights DVD-01
- 2021 Romantic Warriors IV: Krautrock, Part 2 (Xhol is featured prominently)
