= Älgarnas Trädgård =

Swedish band

- Origin: Gothenburg, Sweden
- Genres: Progressive rock; progressive folk; psychedelic rock; space rock; experimental rock
- Years active: 1969–1976; 1998
- Label: Silence
- Past members: Andreas Brandt; Mikael Johansson; Dennis Lundh; Dan Söderqvist; Jan Ternald; Sebastian Öberg; Ulf Mårtensson; Christer Öhman; Kjell Karlgren; Sverre Götberg

Älgarnas Trädgård were a progressive rock band from Sweden which is found on the Nurse With Wound list.

In 1972, they released Framtiden är ett svävande skepp, förankrat i forntiden. More recently, in 2001, archived recordings from 1974 were released under the album title Delayed.
