= Los Angeles Free Music Society =

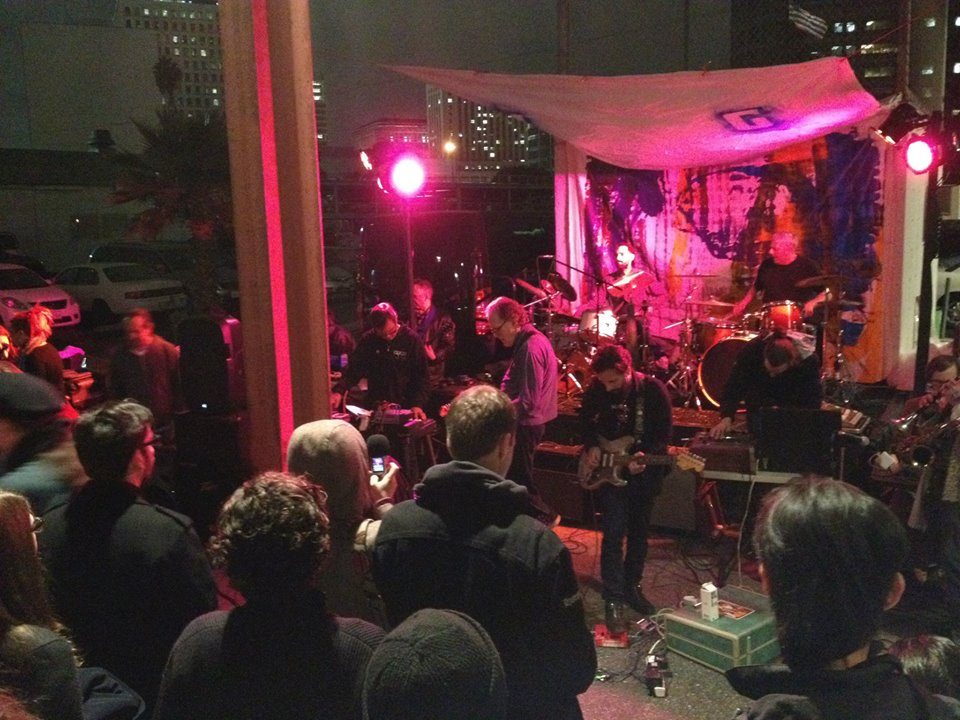
- Los Angeles Free Music Society (Airway) performance at the Museum of Contemporary Art, Los Angeles.

Background information
- Genres: Noise, avant-garde, experimental
- Years active: 1973- present
- Label: Poobah Records
- Members: Joe Potts VETZA; Tom Recchion; Fredrik Nilsen; Joseph Hammer; John Duncan; Dennis Duck; Juan Gomez; Kevin Laffey; Chip Chapman; Jerry Bishop; Ace Farren Ford; Ju Suk Reet Meate Rick Potts
- Website: lafms.com

The Los Angeles Free Music Society (LAFMS) is a loose underground collective of experimental avant-rock artist-musicians formed in 1973. Described as a "lightning rod for art-damage, weird-music lovers everywhere," LAFMS was formed by Chip Chapman, Joe Potts, Rick Potts and Tom Recchion. In addition to performing in various configurations, LAFMS produced records, organized concerts, and produced a magazine titled Light Bulb.

... as much a dada and LSD-inspired piss-take on the high seriousness of experimental music as a shaggy-dog extension of the Zappa/Beefheart/Wildman Fischer axis of dissonance that defined the fringes of "rock" music.

Members of the collective performed as Le Forte Four, Airway, Smegma, Monique Experience, Foundation Boo, Extended Organ, and The Doo-Dooettes. Their influence can be seen in the DIY culture and "isolationist" experimentalists like Caroliner Rainbow, Sun City Girls, and The Thinking Fellers Union Local 282, as well as Japanese noise projects like Hanatarash, Hijokaidan, and Incapacitants.

A ten-CD retrospective titled The Lowest Form of Music, comprising 1970s recordings made under the LAFMS banner, was released by the Cortical Foundation and RRRecords in 1996. An artist's edition of 350 copies was made that contained an 11th disc.

The LAFMS was the focus of a three-day weekend festival in Vauxhall, London at the Beaconsfield Gallery, October 22–24, 2010, that included performances, talks, workshops, films/videos, installations and artworks. LAFMS groups that performed over the weekend included Airway, Smegma, John Duncan, Extended Organ (with David Toop sitting in), Tom Recchion, Le Forte Four, The Tenses, and Dinosaurs With Horns, with special guest performances by Hijokaidan, Incapacitants, Morphogenesis, Mark Durgan with Spoils & Relics, Raionbashi & Kutzkelina, and Bill Kouligas + Joseph Hammer. David Toop and Edwin Pouncey (aka Savage Pencil) lead panel discussions and Rick Potts and Vetza lead workshops.

In 2012 The Box, a downtown Los Angeles art gallery, ran a six-week exhibition celebrating the 40th anniversary of the LAFMS. Entitled "Beneath the Valley of the Lowest Form of Music: The Los Angeles Free Music Society '1972-2012,'" the exhibit showcased nearly 40 years of LAFMS artwork, self-made musical instruments, recordings, ephemera, film/video, and installations, and included a schedule of live performances and artist's talks.

East of Borneo published an anthology of Light Bulb edited by LAFMS founding member Chip Chapman in 2013.

In August 2021, the label Vinyl On Demand released a 13 LP boxed set of material limited to 500 copies plus 99 "friends editions." The collection was produced, art directed and designed by LAMFS member Tom Recchion.
