= Wah-Wah Records Sound =

Spanish record label

- Founded: 1999
- Genre: Various
- Country of origin: Spain
- Official website: www.wah-wahsupersonic.com

Wah Wah Records Sounds is a Spanish record shop and label based in Barcelona.

Starting in 1992 as a record shop, in 1999 Wah Wah started reissuing records which had previously been issued by various companies.

There are four categories of music they issue:

1. Rock Sounds — beat, garage, R&B, psych and prog sounds
2. Black Sounds — jazz, soul, funk and Brazilian sounds
3. Mondo Bizarre — 'cool & strange music', exotica, surf, groovy beats "and other strange sounds"
4. Wah Wah's New Sounds — new productions

== Releases ==
With a few exceptions, which are also available on CD, releases from Wah Wah are only available on vinyl.

As of May 2012, Wah Wah have issued 119 titles:

Releases
Cat No	Artist	Title	Year
LPS001	Arzachel	Arzachel	1999
LPS003	Impala Syndrome	Impala Syndrome	2000
LPS004	Pan Y Regaliz	Pan & Regaliz	2000
LPS005	Evolution	Evolution	2000
LPS006	Spirit Of John Morgan	Spirit Of John Morgan	2001
LPS008	Vainica Doble	Vainica Doble	2001
LPS009	Desintegracion	Tabaco	2001
LPS011	Música Dispersa	Música Dispersa	2002
LPS012	Los Buenos	Groovy Woovy	2003
LPS013	Crow	Colors	2003
LPS014	Máquina	Why?	2004
LPS015	Máquina!	...Funciona!	2004
LPS019	Ia - Batiste	Un Gran Dia	2003
LPS020	The Storm	The Storm	2003
LPS021	Can Am Des Puig	The Book Of AM, Pts. I & II	2006
LPS022	Atila	The Beginning Of The End (El Principio Del Fin)	2005
LPS023	After Life	Cauchemar	2005
LPS025	Hell Preachers Inc.	Supreme Psychedelic Underground	
LPS026	Ugly Custard	Ugly Custard	2005
LPS027	Aguaviva	Cosmonauta	2005
LPS028	William S. Fischer	Akelarre Sorta	2005
LPS029	Ora	Ora	2006
LPS030	The Free Pop Electronic Concept	A New Exciting Experience	2008
LPS031	Nick Garrie	The Nightmare Of J. B. Stanislas	2006
LPS034	Emtidi	Emtidi	2007
LPS036	Bröselmaschine	Bröselmaschine	2007
LPS037	Emtidi	Saat	2007
LPS038	Hölderlin	Hölderlins Traum	2007
LPS039	Floh De Cologne	Fließbandbabys Beat-Show	2007
LPS040	Sergius Golowin	Lord Krishna Von Goloka	2007
LPS041	Guru Guru	UFO	2007
LPS042	Peter Bursch	Peter Bursch Und Die Broselmaschine	2007
LPS043	Franz De Byl	Und	2007
LPS045	Bülent Ortaçgil	Benimle Oynar Mısın	2008
LPS046	Steve Tilston	An Acoustic Confusion	2008
LPS047	Hunt & Turner	Magic Landscape	2008
LPS048	The Sun Also Rises	The Sun Also Rises	2008
LPS049	Annexus Quam	Osmose	2008
LPS050	Guru Guru	Hinten	2008
LPS051	Mythos	Mythos	2008
LPS052	Walpurgis	Queen Of Saba	2008
LPS053	Limbus 4	Mandalas	
LPS054	Xhol	Motherfuckers GmbH & Co KG	2008
LPS055	Annexus Quam	Beziehungen	2008
LPS057	Underground Set	Underground Set	2008
LPS058	The Four Instants	Discotheque	2008
LPS060	Amon Düül	Paradieswärts Düül	2008
LPS061LP	The Inner Space	Agilok & Blubbo	2009
LPS062	Anima-Sound	Stürmischer Himmel	2008
LPS063	Bernd Witthüser	Lieder Von Vampiren, Nonnen Und Toten	2009
LPS064	Ibliss	Supernova	2009
LPS065	Ton Vlasman	White Room With Disintegrating Walls	2009
LPS066	Orange Wedge	Wedge	2009
LPS067	Orange Wedge	No One Left But Me	2009
LPS068	Heldon / Schizo	Electronique Guerilla	2009
LPS069	Heldon	Allez Téia	2009
LPS070	Peter Michael Hamel	Hamel	2010
LPS071	Between	And The Waters Opened	2010
LPS072	OM	OM	2010
LPS073	Jarka	Ortodòxia	2010
LPS074	Jarka	Morgue O Berenice	2010
LPS075	Ia - Batiste	Chichonera's Cat	
LPS076	Embryo	Embryo's Rache	2010
LPS077	Embryo	Father Son And Holy Ghosts	2010
LPS078	Embryo	Opal	2010
LPS079	Embryo Featuring Charlie Mariano	We Keep On	2010
LPS080	Gruppe Between	Einstieg	2010
LPS081	Philippe Besombes	Libra	2010
LPS082	Günter Schickert	Samtvogel	2010
LPS083	Heldon	Third	2010
LPS084	Roger Bunn	Piece Of Mind	2010
LPS085	Anima-Sound	Musik Für Alle	2011
LPS087	Lard Free	Gilbert Artman's Lard Free	2010
LPS088	Lard Free	I'm Around About Midnight	2010
LPS089	Lard Free	III	2010
LPS090	Lard Free	Unnamed	2010
LPS091	Delired Cameleon Family	Visa De Censure N° X	2010
LPS093	The Kühn Brothers and the Mad Rockers	The Kühn Brothers & The Mad Rockers	2010
LPS094	Joachim Kühn & Rolf Kühn	Bloody Rockers	2012
LPs096	Le Système Crapoutchik	Aussi Loin Que Je Me Souvienne...	2011
LPS097	Le Système Crapoutchik	Flop	2011
LPS098	Le Système Crapoutchik	Le Système Crapoutchik	2011
LPS099	Ilous and Decuyper	Ilous & Decuyper	2011
LPS101	Elektriktus	Electronic Mind Waves	2011
LPS102	Ame Son	Catalyse	2011
LPS103	Ame Son	Primitive Expression	2011
LPS104	Heldon	Heldon IV / Agneta Nilsson	2011
LPS105	Roberto Cacciapaglia	Sonanze	2011
SG035	Mi Generación	Toma Tu Parte De Felicidad / Triste Y Solo	2007
SGS001	Vainica Doble	Navidad	2001
WBS12 001	Chakachas	Jungle Fever EP	
WBS7000PR	Astrud Gilberto and the Pinker Tones	If Not For You	2001
WBSLP001	Chakachas	The Best Of...	2002
WBSLP002	Pony Poindexter	En Barcelona	2000
WBSLP003	Various	Black Is Soul: Pama Singles Collection Volume One	2000
WBSLP004	Various	Black Is Soul: Pama Singles Collection Volume Two	2000
WBSLP005	Prince Buster	King Of Blue Beat	2001
WBSLP007	El Chicles	La La La	2001
WBSLP008	Astrud Gilberto With Turrentine	Gilberto With Turrentine	2001
WBSLP009	Bun Hunga And His Combo	Relax	2001
WBSLP010	El Gran Combo	Bugalûs Con El Gran Combo	2005
WBSLP011	Mazacote	Shukandu!	2005
WBSLP012	Various	Heavy Soulful Funky Beautiful Black Power	2005
WBSLPS006	Max B	Max B	2001
WCD 006	The Storm	The Storm	2006
WCD001	Gershon Kingsley	Music To Moog By	2000
WCD004	Pan Y Regaliz	Pan & Regaliz	2003
WCD007	Can Am Des Puig	The Book Of AM, Pts. I & II	2006
WCD010	The Inner Space	Agilok & Blubbo	2009
WDLX003	Aaron Lightman	Aaron Lightman	2009
WLP001	Attilio Mineo	Man In Space With Sound	1997
WLP002	Gershon Kingsley	Music To Moog By	1999
WLP003	The Duke Of Burlington	Flash !	2000
WLP004	Beltran Moner	Formula 1	2001
WLP005	Jim Messina & His Jesters	The Dragsters	2002
WLP006	The Bigroup,	Big Hammer	2005
WLP007	Staff Carpenborg And The Electric Corona	Fantastic Party	2007
WSBSLP013	Heinz von Moisy - Irisation	Las Plantas	2007
WSNLP001	The Pinker Tones	The Pink Connection	2002
