= Airway (band) =

American free improvisation group

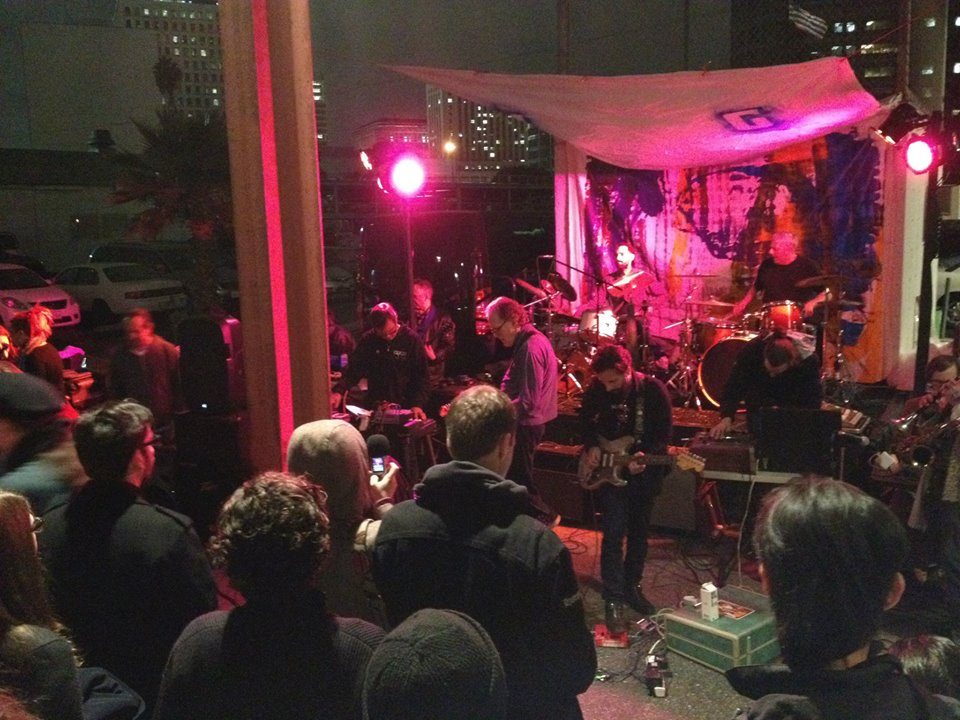
Airway performing in the Museum of Contemporary Art, Los Angeles (January 2014).

Airway is an American musical ensemble based within the Los Angeles Free Music Society.

Airway was initially a solo project of Le Forte Four member Joe Potts. The first release was the Airway 7", which featured subliminal messages to coincide with an art exhibition in Tokyo. In August 1978 Airway made their live debut at the Lace Gallery. This lineup featured Potts and Chip Chapman on electronics, Vetza on vocals, Rick Potts on mandolin, Dennis Duck on saxophone, Juan Gomez on bass, and Tom Recchion on drums. They attempted to create subliminal messages beneath a wall of noise by using tape delay. Recordings from the performance were released as Live At LACE by the Los Angeles Free Music Society. "Live at LACE" was reissued by Harbinger Sound in 2006.

Throughout 1978 the group performed more concerts with differing lineups, but always with Joe Potts' subliminal message experiments. The project disbanded in 1979. Airway reformed in 1998 for a performance at the Santa Monica Museum of Art, which featured 18 musicians. Recordings from the performance were released as Beyond the Pink Live by the Cortical Foundation.

Their sound influenced the Japanese noise band Hijokaidan.

== Discography ==
- Live at LACE (1978, reissued on CD in 2006 and on LP in 2009)
- Live at Beyond The Pink (2001)

== See also ==
- Los Angeles Free Music Society
