= Ame Son =

Ame Son was a progressive rock band from France. They are notable for being featured on the Nurse With Wound list. Members of Ame Son also were in the band Red Noise and Komintern.

== Discography ==
- Catalyse (1971)
- Primitive Expression (1976)
