= Ton Steine Scherben =

German rock band

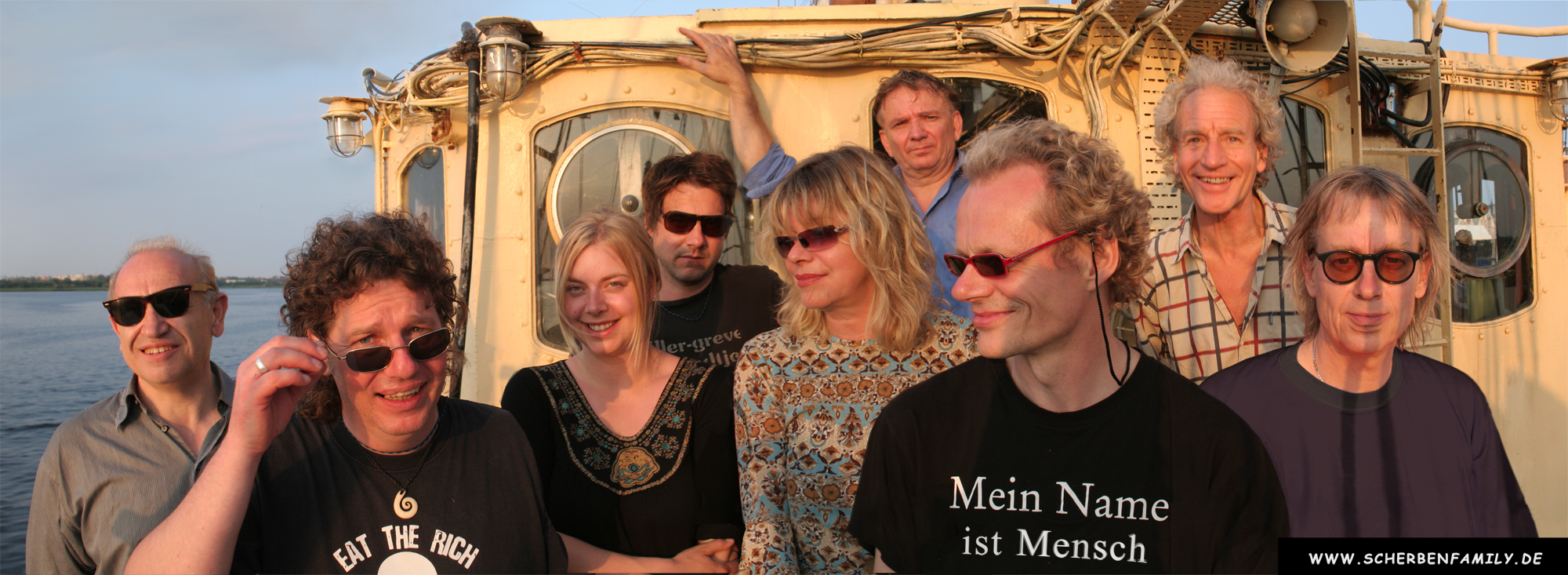

Background information
- Also known as: "die Scherben" ("the Shards") "TSS"
- Origin: West Berlin, West Germany
- Genres: Folk rock, blues, German rock, protopunk
- Years active: 1970–1985
- Label: David Volksmund Produktion (DVP)

Ton Steine Scherben (German pronunciation: [ˈtoːn ˈʃtaɪnə ˈʃɛːɐ̯bn̩]) was one of the first and most influential German language rock bands of the 1970s and early 1980s. Well known for the highly political and emotional lyrics of vocalist Rio Reiser, they became a musical mouthpiece of new left movements, such as the squatting movement, during that time in Germany and their hometown of West Berlin in particular. Today, after the band's demise in 1985, and the death of Rio Reiser in 1996, Ton Steine Scherben have retained a cult following and popularity in the related scenes. Recently, some of the remaining members have given reunion concerts.

== Etymology ==
Ton Steine Scherben's literal English translation is "Clay Stones Shards"; in German, "Ton" can mean "sound" as well, so the band's name may be considered to be an amphibology. Singer Rio Reiser usually told journalists the name was taken from a description by pioneer archeologist Heinrich Schliemann of what he saw when he first came to the site of ancient Troy. Other members of the band claim in the biography "Keine Macht für Niemand - Die Geschichte der Ton Steine Scherben" ("No power for nobody - the story of Ton Steine Scherben") that it is a play on the name of the West German labor union Bau-Steine-Erden (Construction-Stone-Earth). The band name is also a tribute to The Rolling Stones and to "Die roten Steine" (The red stones), a trainee theatre group from Berlin.

== History ==
Formed in 1970 by vocalist and guitarist Rio Reiser (his legal name was Ralph Christian Möbius), guitarist R. P. S. Lanrue (legally named Ralph Peter Steitz), Kai Sichtermann on bass guitar, and drummer Wolfgang Seidel when the members were all around 20 years of age. They are nowadays considered to have been one of the first genuine German-language rock bands; coming into being after Ihre Kinder from Nuremberg, but well before Udo Lindenberg's Panikorchester, the first widely successful, mainstream German language rock act. Their first big-stage appearance was at an Open-Air on 6 September 1970 on the Fehmarn stage where Jimi Hendrix had had his last appearance directly before. A house right next to the stage went up in flames while they were still playing; it has been alleged that it had been set on fire by the security personnel who had just received news that the event's organizers had disappeared with all the revenues. Still many people believed that Ton Steine Scherben had set the stage on fire, which gave them tremendous credibility in the radical scene.

Die Scherben released their material through their own label. The "David Volksmund Produktion" (David from "David and Goliath"; Volksmund = the people's voice) released not only the LPs of the Scherben but also of Caramboulage, an all-female rock group which consisted of Angie Olbrich, Elfie-Esther Steitz-Praeker (R. P. S.'s sister) and Britta Neander (died in 2005); also they were engaged in the German gay-movement, so they released two LPs of "Brühwarm" and a band namend "Stricher" ["hustler" or "the moneyboys"]; the last record of the David-Volksmund-Produktion is the LP "Sternschnuppen" of the singer-songwriter Misha Schoeneberg. In 2003 DVP was brought back to life.

In the middle of the 1970s the pressure on the Scherben from their anarchistic fanbase grew. The Band felt more and more like a "music-box", playing for the radical scene on cue. While the band attempted a shift toward more personal lyrics, the radical scene insisted that they remain as political as before. Under this pressure the band escaped from Berlin to Fresenhagen, a little town in Nordfriesland, where they bought an old farm, which the numerous bandmembers, about 16 in all, repaired. There they tried to make their dream of "working & living together" come true.

After a period of being managed by Claudia Roth (later to become co-chairwoman of the German Green Party), they disbanded in 1985 when the band's debt became unbearable and because they thought that everything that could be said was said.

Singer Rio Reiser then embarked on a solo career until his death in 1996. At that time the rest of "Ton Steine Scherben" reunited one more time for a farewell concert.

In 2014, 29 years after the split the band reunited and went on tour in Germany, Austria and Switzerland. R. P. S. Lanrue died of cancer on 14 July 2024 at age 74.

== Musical traits, lyrical themes and influence ==
Ton Steine Scherben were pioneers in German music culture. Their style has been described as rock with a "renegade stance, what in later years would be dubbed 'punk'."

Their lyrics were at the beginning anti-capitalist and anarchist. They did not think the socialism of the Soviet Union was anywhere near real socialism, and had connections to the squatter scene (e.g. Rauch-Haus-Song) and the German Red Army Faction during the time before the latter turned to direct guerrilla actions. Later Ton Steine Scherben toned down on political issues and explored more personal themes like freedom, love, drugs, and sadness. They also contributed to two full-length concept albums about homosexuality which were issued under the name Brühwarm (literally: boiling warm) in cooperation with a gay-revue group.

All their albums were self-published and promoted. Revenues from the albums were slim and the band was often expected by other leftists to give free "solidarity concerts" at political events, both of which contributed to the band's perpetually poor financial situation and its eventual dissolution. Only few singles were released, which rarely received commercial attention. The Scherben were also on so called "black lists" due to their perceived left extremism, and were thus not played on Germany's public radio stations of the time (private radio was only legalized in Germany in the late 1980s, after the band's dissolution).

The gay rights activist and avant-garde director Rosa von Praunheim repeatedly gave Rio Reiser artistic suggestions.

== Members ==
=== Founding members ===
- Rio Reiser -- vocals, guitar (1970–1985, † 1996)
- R. P. S. Lanrue -- lead guitar (1970–1985, † 2024)
- Kai Sichtermann -- bass guitar (1970–1985, except 1974–1975)
- Wolfgang Seidel -- drums (1970–1971)

=== Last line-up ===
- Rio Reiser -- vocals (1970–1985)
- R. P. S. Lanrue -- guitar (1970–1985)
- Kai Sichtermann -- bass guitar (1970–1985, except 1974–1975)
- Funky K. Götzner -- drums (1974–1985)
- Martin Paul -- keyboards (1981–1985, † 2026)
- Dirk Schlömer -- guitar (1983–1985)

=== Session & live members ===
- Kai Sichtermann -- bass guitar
- Funky K. Götzner -- drums, percussions
- Nicolo Rovera -- vocals, guitar
- Ella Josephine Ebsen -- vocals, guitar
- Maxime S.P. -- drums, percussions
- Lukas McNally -- keyboards, vocals
- Simon Barchewitz -- saxophone
- Elfie-Esther Steitz -- vocals, chorus

=== Former members ===
- Nikel Pallat -- vocals, saxophone, management (1970–1978)
- Jörg Schlotterer -- organising, flute (1971–1978; † 2025)
- Sven Jordan -- drums (1971)
- Olaf Lietzau -- drums (1972)
- Angela Olbrich -- chorus, percussions (1972–1981, except 1976–1977)
- Captain Hynding -- drums, guitar (1972; † 2018)
- Helmut Stöger -- drums (1973)
- Werner "Gino" Götz -- bass guitar (1974–1975)
- Britta Neander -- percussions, chorus (1974–1982; † 2004)
- Hannes Eyber -- inspiration, lyrics, producer (1981–1985)
- Martin Paul -- keyboard, (1981–1985)
- Marius del Mestre -- choir/chorus, guitar (1981–1982)
- Dirk Schlömer -- guitar (1983–1985)

== Discography ==
- 1971 - Warum geht es mir so dreckig?
- 1972 - Keine Macht für Niemand
- 1975 - Wenn die Nacht am tiefsten…
- 1980 - IV
- 1981 - Auswahl I
- 1983 - Scherben
- 1984 - In Berlin (live)
- 1985 - Live I

The following albums were issued after the band ceased recording:

- 1996 - Live II
- 2006 - Live III

== See also ==
- Trikont Musikverlag
