= Rio Reiser =

German musician (1950–1996)

Background information
- Born: Ralph Christian Möbius; 9 January 1950; Berlin, Germany
- Died: 20 August 1996 (aged 46) Fresenhagen, Germany
- Genres: Folk rock, protopunk
- Years active: 1970–1996
- Formerly of: Ton Steine Scherben

Ralph Christian Möbius (9 January 1950 – 20 August 1996), known professionally as Rio Reiser, was a German musician and from 1970 to 1985 the lead singer and main lyric-writer for the rock group Ton Steine Scherben. After that band broke up, he worked as a solo artist. Among his best known songs are Macht kaputt, was euch kaputt macht, Keine Macht für Niemand, and the Rauch-Haus-Song with the Ton Steine Scherben. As a solo artist, his best known songs are König von Deutschland, Alles Lüge, and Junimond. Reiser supported squatting in the early 1970s and later the green political party Die Grünen. After the German reunification, he joined the Party of Democratic Socialism.

== Life ==
=== Early years ===
Reiser's father was an engineer for Siemens, and the family moved several times because of his father's work; they lived in West Berlin, Upper Bavaria, Nuremberg, Mannheim, and Fellbach. Reiser was never really able to feel at home in any of these places. Many of his friends said, when they were asked in an interview broadcast on the TV channel Arte in 1998, two years after his death, that he started playing music to create a place where he felt at home.

Reiser was known by his friends as someone who had a special mind of his own. For example, he managed to persuade his mother Erika Möbius that he was allowed to stop attending school and start an apprenticeship in a studio for photography, which he then quit in order to join a music conservatory and later to follow his two older brothers to West Berlin at the early age of 17 in order to put the world's first "Rock Opera" onto stage. His mother supported his musical and artistic ambitions since she had soon realized that he was an autodidact; he never learned things when he was taught by someone else. Thus he taught himself how to play cello, guitar, piano and other instruments, wrote lyrics and poetry and later also assumed jobs as actor in some movies and TV shows or at the theatre.

He was given his nickname Rio as teenager by an eccentric artist and friend of the family who invented the name "Rio de Galaxis" for him in an "intergalactic youth ordination". He kept the nickname and later decided to change his name from Ralph Möbius to Rio Reiser when he played a leading role in the movie Johnny West and needed a catchy artist name. He took the idea for the name Reiser from his older brother Gert who had occasionally used it as artist name before. The name makes reference to the main character of the 1785-86 autobiographical novel Anton Reiser by Karl Philipp Moritz.

During his teenage years, Rio Reiser first discovered—and immediately became a big fan of—The Beatles at age 13 who represented the sound—and way of life—of the future for him and also inspired him to learn to play guitar, to compose his own songs and to form his first band. Later he preferred the rough, direct sound of The Rolling Stones. In reference to John Lennon and Paul McCartney, who were usually credited as "Lennon/McCartney" with respect of the songs they wrote, Rio and his band colleague and best friend R.P.S. Lanrue (real name Ralph Peter Steitz) as composers of most of the Ton Steine Scherben-songs were often credited as "Möbius/Steitz". Besides contemporary rock bands which became the soundtrack of the social changes beginning in the Sixties, Rio Reiser was also influenced by other music styles including orchestral film soundtracks, German "folk songs" and traditional music and German singers such as Marlene Dietrich. The avant-garde director Rosa von Praunheim repeatedly gave Reiser artistic suggestions.

Reiser was unique among German rock stars of his time in being openly gay. He came out in 1970 and lived openly as gay in his private life. At the beginning of his career, Reiser sometimes felt like a misfit among the political groups and various movements which, in the early Seventies, did not strongly approve of homosexuality. He later gained confidence while working with artists who were engaged in the newly forming gay movement of Berlin, including the gay performance group "Brühwarm" which recorded two LPs with music composed by Ton Steine Scherben. Reiser did not come out publicly until the 1980s. In 1986 he began to discuss being gay in interviews and talk-shows.

As an adult, Rio soon discovered his musical talents, which opened a way for him to express himself, thus enabling him to overcome restraints he otherwise felt due to a certain, intrinsic insecurity or shyness towards other people. The ability to reach out to others—even to the unknown masses in a concert audience—through his musical performance was later often referred to as being the core of his special talent to touch his listeners, or even to "build a relationship" with each of them for the period of a concert.

=== Musical career ===
While he still went to school, Reiser became singer in his first rock band The Beat Kings. The band had been founded by R.P.S. Lanrue (real name Ralph Peter Steitz), a boy living in the neighbourhood, who had heard of Reiser's singing talents and had asked him to join the band after letting Reiser perform a few songs to give a sample (as R.P.S. Lanrue later claimed in an interview, the Rolling Stones song "Play with fire" tipped the balance). Lanrue, who was of the same age as Reiser, soon became Reiser's closest friend and musical counterpart; he went on to support Reiser as a musician and lived with him most of the time until his death.

After leaving school, Reiser left his then hometown, as well as The Beat Kings, to follow his two older brothers' call to Berlin in order to compose the music for their common project, the first Beat-Opera, which turned out to be, in the words of Rio, an "absolute flop". Nevertheless, Reiser stayed in Berlin, where he was later joined by Lanrue.

After occasionally having toured the countryside with the theatre group "Hoffmans Comic Theater" (consisting in Reiser, his brothers and a group of friends), Reiser went on to continue theatrical projects in Berlin where he joined an improvisation theatre group which played scenes from the everyday life of pupils and trainees, thus adopting and reflecting the social problems among young people in West Berlin in the Sixties, as well as its tense and sense of imminent social change. The theatre was very successful with young people and toured through Germany until 1969. The involvement in the context of the student and youth movement—not only as musician and actor, but often in the political debates which were to follow the theatre performance as well, played an important role for Rio Reiser's development of political awareness and for his lifelong commitment—both privately and as musician—to liberation movements of various kinds, including, in particular, the left-wing political movement characteristic for the Sixties and Seventies (while he liked to put an emphasis on supporting the workers' and "simple people's" interests rather than the students' intellectual approach), the Gay liberation movement and later, the German ecological movement. His musical work to a large extent reflects these political influences and convictions and thus can hardly be detached from his political positions.

=== Ton Steine Scherben ===
In 1970, Reiser recorded his first single with the band Ton Steine Scherben. The band name was chosen in a lengthy democratic decision procedure among the members, friends and supporters of the band. The original name idea was actually "VEB Ton Steine Scherben", but the "VEB" was soon dropped. The band name can be translated both as "clay stones shards" and as "sound stones shards", thus offering different approaches to interpretation (sometimes also understood as a political program) and, last not least, making reference to Reiser's favorites The Rolling Stones. In that same year the group performed their first public concert and recorded their first full-length record.

The band soon became very popular with the squatter scene, left-wing student and workers' movement and was invited to numerous political events to provide the soundtrack to demonstrations, parties and rallies across Germany which often inspired the audience to translate the message into action afterwards. Thus, many buildings were seized after the end of a concert, and the band often ended up sitting in some commune discussing the political agenda with their hosts. Reiser later revealed in his autobiography that he sometimes would have preferred to just get away with some nice person.

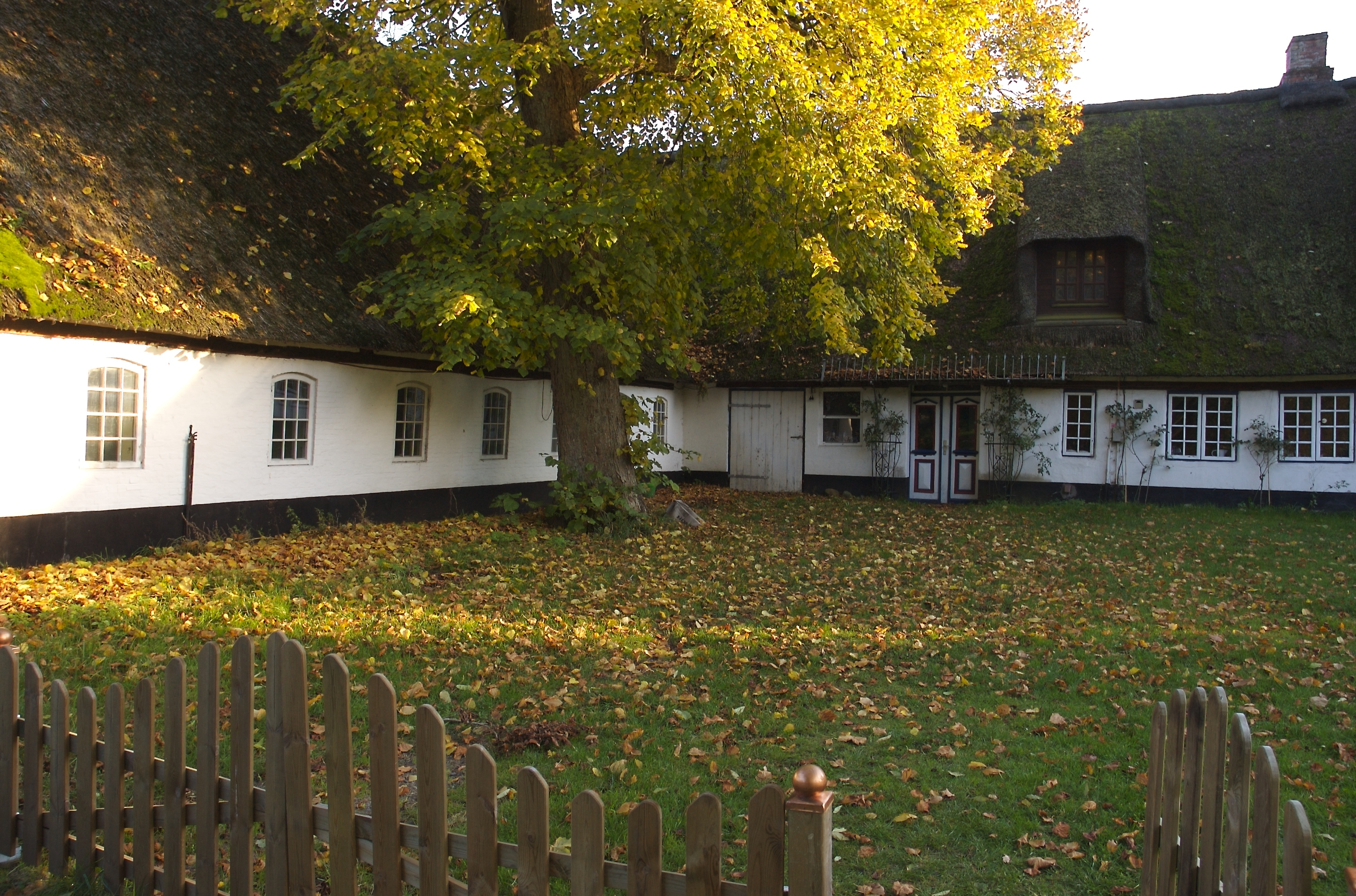
This farmhouse in Fresenhagen became Reiser's residence in 1975.

15 years of touring, four more LPs and various film projects and collaborations with other musicians followed, including the recording of two children's records. Reiser lived together with the band and a large group of friends and supporters most of that time, first sharing a commune in Berlin. In 1975—after the band was tiring of the numerous demands and expectations by all kinds of political groups—the group settled down on a farm in Fresenhagen, in North Germany which continued to be Reiser's refuge and place of inspiration even after moving back to Berlin a couple of years later. One of the band's most important and ambitious albums, the "Black Album", was recorded there.

Ton Steine Scherben were musically very successful and, being one of the first rock bands in Germany which actually wrote and performed German rock songs, opened the door for countless successful German rock and pop bands to follow. Due to their refusal to adapt to the demands of the mainstream music business, as well as to financial mismanagement, a certain "outlawish" image in the eyes of the large radio and TV stations and a fan community which often forgot that the band had to make a living out of the music and would have despised any commercial ambitions, they were not able to translate their musical success and widespread popularity into financial stability.

=== Solo career ===
In 1985, Reiser and the band finally split, partly due to a feeling that it was time to move on, but to a large extent because of a disastrous financial situation. Reiser had a large debt with the group, but his early solo career went so well that he was free from debt in a short time. His first solo record-album was called "Rio I" and included the popular song König von Deutschland ("King of Germany"). The album was produced by Annette Humpe, a renowned German music producer who had already produced Reiser's very first solo single, "Dr. Sommer", some time ago when he was in need of cash and had asked her for support. The song "König von Deutschland" became one of the few real hits of Reiser, has been covered and cited by many artists ever since and is still known among most people in Germany. Other hit singles of the first album included the love song "Für immer und dich" and the melancholic "Junimond". Reiser could not repeat the commercial success of the first album, nevertheless he released five further studio albums until his death, most of them highly praised by the critics.

Many of his fans from the Ton Steine Scherben-days thought that he was selling out to mainstream, capitalist music business, and blamed him for becoming—at least for a period of time—a commercially successful musician. However, when listening closely to the lyrics, it can be noted that Reiser never abandoned his personal approach to music, politics, life and love, although the message was delivered in a more subtle way now. Reiser sometimes admitted that the objections to his solo music, even hatred by some old-time fans was a serious problem for him. Wandering on the edge of commercial adaptability, while trying to conform with the expectations of old friends, fans and political movements which he supported meant a difficult struggle for Reiser which sometimes drove him to despair and depression. At the same time, he continued to be a very creative, productive musician and songwriter who collaborated with other musicians and friends and underwent strenuous concert tours which often brought him close to physical exhaustion. One of the highlights of his career were two concerts performed in East Berlin in 1988 where he faced a sold-out concert hall filled with young people on the verge of the revolution which one year later led to the collapse of the political system of the German Democratic Republic and the opening of the Berlin wall. Recordings of the concerts prove that the east German audience knew the lyrics of his solo songs, and in particular all of the "Ton Steine Scherben" songs which they performed by heart, even though the albums were hard to come by in East Germany.

Reiser wrote and performed most of his songs entirely by himself, although he was often accompanied by his longtime friend R.P.S. Lanrue who continued to support him as lead guitar player and also delivered many musical ideas, while a few of his song lyrics were also written by or together with his long-term partner Misha Schoeneberg. Reiser's sixth and last solo album, which was recorded in 1995, was called Himmel und Hölle (Heaven and Hell). The album was the last one which he was contractually obliged to deliver to his major music company, and both the musical approach as well as the lyrics imply that Reiser was about to return to a state of inner independence from the major business not only personally, but also in artistic terms, including a sound and concept which is often seen as more authentic than the previous studio albums. After the release of the last album, which was not strongly marketed by his company, even though praised by the critics, Reiser was preparing new songs which he would have produced independently again, the completion of which was interrupted by his sudden and unexpected death.

Some critics say that Rio Reiser created a new image of a German folk singer; he was even called a "Schlager" artist and a "Volksmusik" musician (sometimes translated as "folk music", but in a literary sense it means music of the people). To other critics, Reiser was simply a singer in a rock band. However, Reiser sometimes approved of being referred to a Volksmusik musician, because he thought that this would simply mean he sang music for the people.

=== Death ===
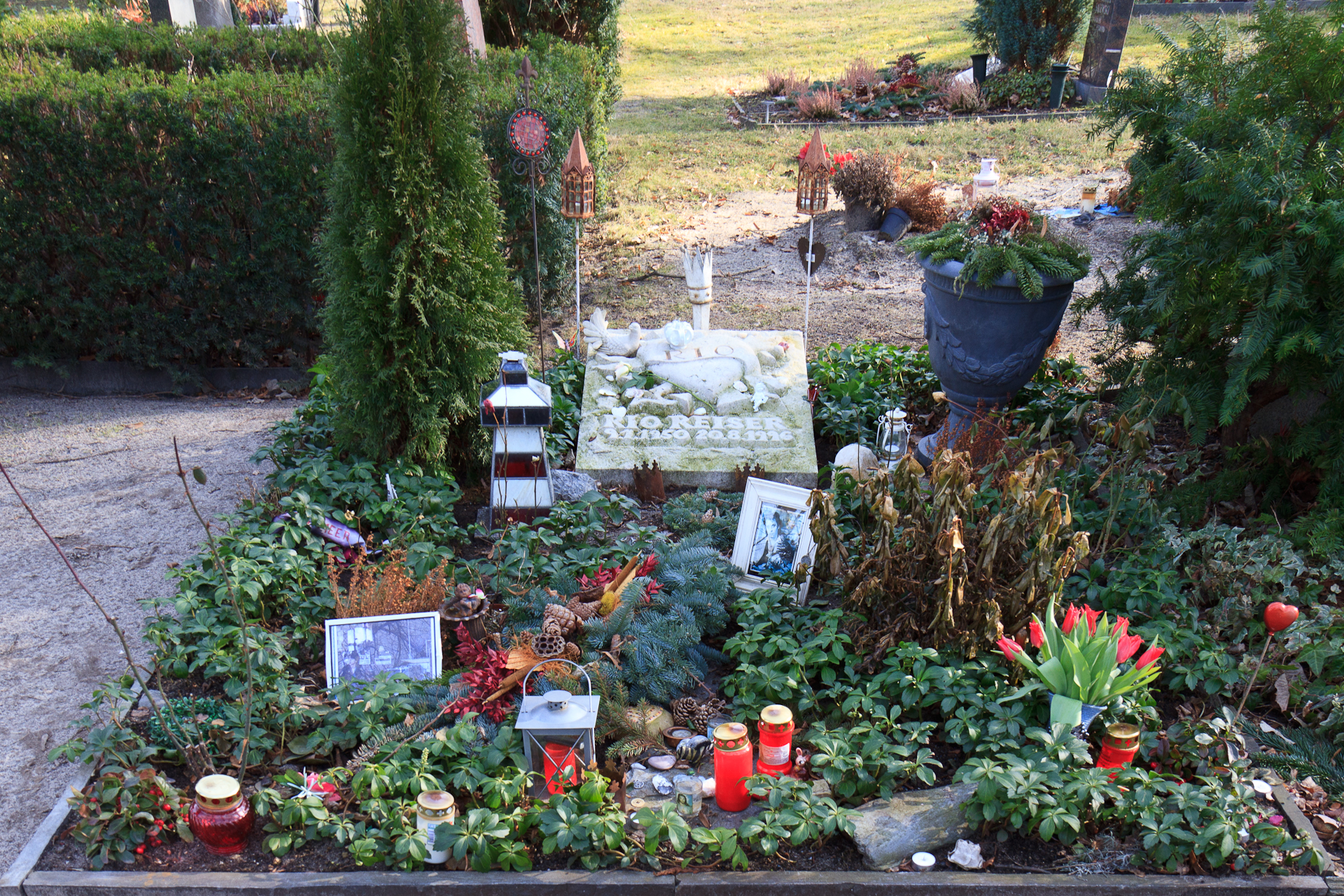
Reiser's grave in Berlin

Reiser died on 20 August 1996 from a circulatory collapse after internal bleeding caused by esophageal varices at his home in Fresenhagen, where he was buried on his own property under an apple tree.

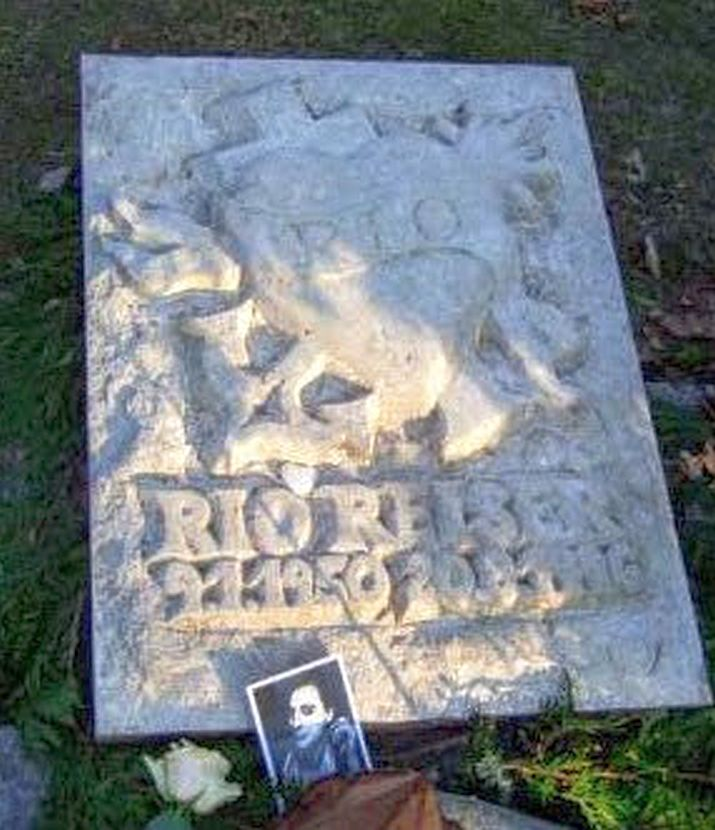
Rio Reiser gravestone (from Fresenhagen, after transfer to Berlin, February 2011)

His grave was moved to Berlin (Alter St.-Matthäus-Kirchhof) when Reiser's heirs sold the Fresenhagen property.

== Discography ==
Rio Reiser produced six studio albums as a solo artist, which were released on Columbia (CBS).

=== Studio albums ===
1. 1986: Rio I. (Columbia Records, November 1986)
2. 1987: Blinder Passagier (Columbia Records, September 1987)
3. 1990: *** (Columbia Records, April 1990)
4. 1991: Durch die Wand (Columbia Records, July 1991)
5. 1993: Über Alles (Columbia Records, August 1993)
6. 1995: Himmel und Hölle (Columbia Records, March 1995; re-released January 2002)

=== Compilations ===
- 1994: König von Deutschland – Das Beste von Rio Reiser (April 1994; König von Deutschland ’94)
- 1996: Balladen (July 1996)
- 1997: Unter Geiern (January 1997; double CD, best of with b-sides and remixes)
- 2000: Junimond – Die Balladen (June 2000)
- 2000: Alles Lüge – Best
- 2003: Zwischen Null und Zero (September 2003; double cd with b-sides and remixes)
- 2016: Alles und noch viel mehr – Das Beste (August 2016)
- 2016: Blackbox Rio Reiser (November 2016; cd box set with 16 CDs, including almost entirely songs that were not previously released)

=== Live albums ===
- 1999: Live in der Seelenbinder-Halle, Berlin/ DDR 1988 (November 1999)

=== Other albums ===
- 1974: Martha – Die letzte Wandertaube (Oktober 1974), music for the film of the same name
- 1998: Am Piano 1 (October 1998)
- 1999: Am Piano 2 (March 1999)
- 2000: Am Piano 1-3 (December 2000; 3 LPs)
- 2007: Rio Reiser singt Lieder von kleinen und großen Vorstadttigern (November 2007; previously unreleased songs from theatrical plays and audio plays)

=== Tribute albums ===
- 1996: Abschied von Rio (December 1996; live double cd with Herbert Grönemeyer, Ulla Meinecke, Ton Steine Scherben, Haindling, among others)
- 2003: Familienalbum (October 2003; including Die Sterne, Fehlfarben, Fettes Brot, Nena, Marianne Rosenberg, Söhne Mannheims, Paula and the unreleased Rio-Reiser song Herzverloren)
- 2005: Familienalbum II (October 2005; tribute cd)
- 2020: Wir müssen hier raus. Eine Hommage an Ton Steine Scherben & Rio Reiser (November 2020; double cd/lp)

=== Singles ===
- 1984: Dr. Sommer (March 1984)
- 1986: Alles Lüge (May 1986)
- 1986: Junimond (August 1986)
- 1986: König von Deutschland (October 1986)
- 1986: Für immer und dich (November 1986)
- 1987: Blinder Passagier (August 1987)
- 1988: Manager (January 1988)
- 1988: Ich denk an dich (May 1988)
- 1989: Über Nacht (1989 – Tatort-Titelsong Der Pott)
- 1990: Geld (March 1990)
- 1990: Zauberland (June 1990)
- 1991: Jetzt schlägt’s 13 (June 1991)
- 1991: Nur dich (November 1991)
- 1993: Nimmst du mich mit (August 1993)
- 1993: Inazitti (December 1993)
- 1994: König von Deutschland #94 (March 1994)
- 1995: Straße (April 1995)

=== Video albums ===
- 2003: Ton Steine Scherben – Land in Sicht (27. January 2003, Live cut from the May 30, 1983 performance at the Offenbacher Stadthalle)
- 2005: Konzert, Videos, Interviews (March 14, 2005; live cut from the Seelenbinderhalle and all videos)
- 2009: Lass uns 'n Wunder sein (double DVD with video footage from the Seelenbinderhalle in 1988, uncut interviews and 2½ hours of bonus material)

=== Choir works ===
- 2012: Reinhard Fehling: CD 'Rios Reise' – 'König von Überall' – https://reinhard-fehling.de/index.php/rios-reise-live. 'Sternchen': Chorversion mit Noten https://www.youtube.com/watch?v=A9EU8GNsWis

== Literature ==
- Rio Reiser, Hannes Eyber: König von Deutschland. Kiepenheuer & Witsch, Köln 1997, new edition from Möbius Rekords, Berlin 2001, ISBN 3-00-007733-2.
- Dirk Nishen (publisher): Ton Steine Scherben: Geschichten, Noten, Texte und Fotos aus 15 Jahren. new edition from David Volksmund Produktion, Fresenhagen 1997, ISBN 3-00-021702-9.
- Dirk Ducar (2003). "Reiser, Rio". Neue Deutsche Biographie (in German). Vol. 21. Berlin: Duncker & Humblot. pp. 389–390. (full text online).
- Hartmut El Kurdi: Schwarzrote Pop-Perlen. Wehrhahn Verlag, Hannover 2001, ISBN 3-932324-82-X.
- Hartmut El Kurdi: Unter Geiern. In: Mein Leben als Teilzeit-Flaneur. Edition Tiamat, Berlin 2001, ISBN 3-89320-047-9.
- Kai Sichtermann, Jens Johler, Christian Stahl: Keine Macht für Niemand. Schwarzkopf & Schwarzkopf, Berlin 2003, ISBN 3-89602-468-X.
- Wolfgang Seidel: Scherben. Musik, Politik und Wirkung der Ton Steine Scherben. Ventil Verlag, Mainz 2005, ISBN 3-931555-94-1.
- Hollow Skai: Das alles und noch viel mehr. Rio Reiser: die inoffizielle Biografie des Königs von Deutschland. Heyne, Munich 2006, ISBN 3-453-12038-8.
- Thomas Steensen: Ton Steine Scherben. Rio Reiser und die Freie Republik Fresenhagen. In: Nordfriesland, published by Nordfrissk Instituut, Nr. 170 (Juni 2010), S. 15–19.
- Wolfgang Haberl: Rio Reiser. Südwestbuch-Verlag, Stuttgart 2015, ISBN 978-3-944264-67-7.
- Rio Reiser. In: Persönlichkeiten in Berlin 1825–2006. Erinnerungen an Lesben, Schwule, Bisexuelle, trans- und intergeschlechtliche Menschen. Senatsverwaltung für Arbeit, Integration und Frauen, Berlin 2015, S. 56–57. urn:nbn:de:kobv:109-1-7841313 (archive)
- Gert Möbius: Halt dich an deiner Liebe fest. Rio Reiser, Biografie. Aufbau, Berlin 2016, ISBN 978-3-351-03627-0
- Rio Reiser, Hannes Eyber: König von Deutschland. Erinnerungen an Ton Steine Scherben und mehr. Mit einem Vorwort von Rocko Schamoni. Kiepenheuer & Witsch, Cologne 2016, ISBN 978-3-462-04860-5.
