= Rock music in Germany =

German rock music (Deutschrock) came into its own only by the late 1960s, but spawned many bands spanning genres such as krautrock, Neue Deutsche Welle, heavy metal, punk, and industrial.

Rock and roll itself arose in the United States in the 1940s, and spread around the world beginning in about 1956. There were few German performers at that time, even though American rock was popular in (West) Germany. Rockabilly stars like Bill Haley & His Comets were of particular popularity. The reasons for this lack of German musical innovation were the suppression of "degenerate" forms of music by the Nazis and/or the traumatic effects of the war—while Germany was a center of several forms of modern music before the Nazi era, it had difficulty developing its own music culture after the war.

== 1960s and 1970s: Krautrock ==
Mostly instrumental, the signature sound of krautrock mixed rock music and "rock band" instrumentation (guitar, bass, drums) with electronic instrumentation and textures, often with what would now be described as an ambient music sensibility.

By the end of the 1960s, the American and British counterculture and hippie movement had moved rock towards psychedelic rock, heavy metal, progressive rock and other styles (from which Scorpions rose to prominence), incorporating, for the first time in popular music, socially and politically incisive lyrics. The 1968 student riots in Germany, France and Italy had created a class of young, intellectual continental listeners, while nuclear weapons, pollution and war inspired protests and activism. Music had taken a turn towards electronic avant-garde in the mid-1950s.

These factors all laid the scene for what came to be termed krautrock, which arose at the first major German rock festival in 1968 at Essen. Among others, the political rock group Floh de Cologne from Cologne played there. Like their American and British counterparts, German rock musicians played a kind of psychedelia. That same year, 1968, saw the foundation of the Zodiak Free Arts Lab in Berlin by Hans-Joachim Roedelius and Conrad Schnitzler, which further popularized the psychedelic-rock sound in the German mainstream.

== Neue Deutsche Welle ==
Neue Deutsche Welle (New German Wave) is an outgrowth of British punk rock, post-punk and new wave which appeared in the mid-to late 1970s.

== Ostrock ==
Ostrock refers to rock music scene from the former German Democratic Republic (also known as East Germany), which began at roughly the same time as in the West.

== Punk rock ==
In the early 1980s several bands like Böhse Onkelz, Die Toten Hosen and Die Ärzte originated from the punk scene. The aforementioned groups later became three of the most commercially successful bands in Germany.

== Hamburger Schule ==
Hamburger Schule (School of Hamburg) is an underground music-movement that started at the late 1980s and was still active until around the mid-1990s.

== Neue Deutsche Härte ==
(New German Hardness)

Since the early 1990s bands like Rammstein, Eisbrecher, Wutbürger, KMFDM, Oomph!, Tanzwut, Liquido and Megaherz developed this kind of Rock music as a mixture of rock, heavy metal and electronic music.

== Medieval metal ==
Medieval metal or medieval rock is a subgenre of folk metal that blends hard rock or heavy metal music with medieval folk music.
