= Dieter Dierks =

German record producer and music publisher

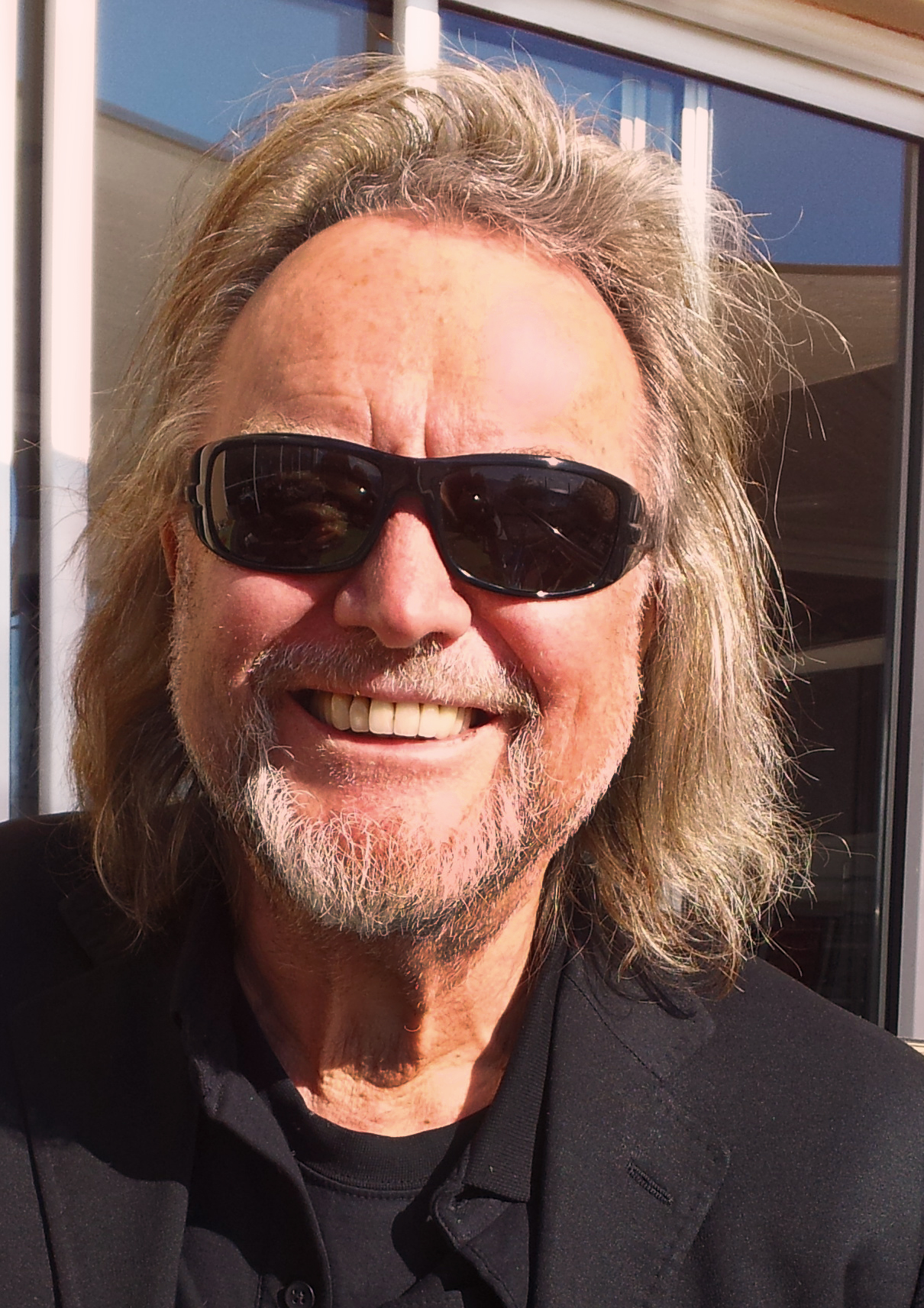
- Dierks in 2014

Background information
- Born: 9 February 1943 (age 82); Stommeln, Germany
- Genres: Krautrock, hard rock, heavy metal, pop music
- Occupation(s): Sound engineer, record producer, entrepreneur
- Website: dierksstudios.com

Dieter Dierks (born 9 February 1943) is a German record producer, sound engineer, music publisher, studio owner and musician. He became well known as producer of the rock band Scorpions who were signed to him between 1975 and 1988. Before that time, he had already successfully established Hamburg-based band Atlantis in the US. Between 1969 and 1975, numerous albums of the "Krautrock" era were produced at Dierks Studio. From 1975 onwards, more and more international artists started booking his state-of-the art sound and TV studios.

== Personal life ==
Dierks is the son of a Jewish mother and a Catholic father. The latter was an orchestra conductor, violinist, sax player and composer. His mother Ursula ran a grocery store. Dieter Dierks was married twice and has four children with four different women. His second wife, Corina Fortmann is the sister of Swiss composer Thomas Fortmann and for many years she was an instrumental part in building the "Dierks Empire". Their daughter, Dominique Schilling, works in Los Angeles as a film director and screenwriter. Dierks' oldest son, Michael Dierks, is an actor. His oldest daughter from his first marriage, Michaela Dierks, works as a TV and music promoter in Cologne. His youngest son, Julien Freundt, works as a sound engineer, composer, music producer and management assistant at his father's company. Dieter's mother Ursula, who was in charge of the studio catering, died in 1991.

== The beginning ==
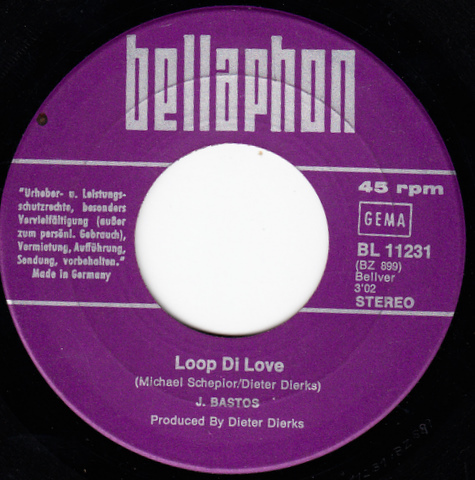
J. Bastos – Loop di Love

Initially, Dieter Dierks wanted to become a director. He studied theatre arts and afterwards went to a drama school. He worked as an assistant director to Kurt Wilhelm, Karl Fruchtmann, Jürgen Goslar and the former Burgtheater artistic director Gerhard Klingenberg. At the same period of time he also played guitar and bass in various rock bands and started setting up his own studios on his parents' premises in Stommeln. The first studio rooms were built in the attic of his parents' house. With his two re-vamped Revox amateur recording devices Dieter Dierks soon managed to attract many young, creative musicians. Again around that time Dierks formed the band "Hush" together with Tommy Engel who was then the drummer of Cologne-based band Tony Hendrik Five, and additional member Frieder Viehmann. In 1969 the band released the single "Oh! Darling/Schau mir in die Augen" (Bellaphon label #1112). The band's live appearances were known to be rather loud.

Two years later Dierks built a large studio complex in the backyard of his parents' house. Shortly afterwards, the apartment building next door was turned into a hotel for studio guests. This way he had created an "all in one" entity as far as music production was concerned: musicians were able to work and live in the same place – a concept that was unique in Germany at the time. During this phase, in 1969, Dierks produced the successful disco hit Loop Di Love with singer Jay Bastos, which was released in 1971 in the Netherlands, Belgium and Germany. The single enjoyed immense chart success and sold several million copies.

== The Krautrock and Electronica era ==
In the early seventies Studio 1 became an attraction for a new German generation of musicians of the then flourishing hippie culture. The mixture of countryside ambience and high tech studio equipment appealed to them. The name of the village near Cologne gradually started popping up in German music magazines like Musikexpress, Sounds, the trade magazine Musikmagazin as well as Pop Rocky. The editors of these magazine dedicated full pages to this "sound factory" in Stommeln and its productions.

Dierks Studios – along with the studios of Conny Plank in Wolperath – became the home of the most important Krautrock artists, first generation German rock bands, and electronic pioneers, among them Ihre Kinder, Ash Ra Tempel, Tangerine Dream, Witthüser & Westrupp, Hoelderlin, Wallenstein, Birth Control, Guru Guru, Embryo, Popol Vuh, Bröselmaschine, the politically-oriented rock bands Amon Düül and Floh de Cologne as well as Krautrock super group Cosmic Jokers founded by music visionary Rolf-Ulrich Kaiser. They were all flocking to Stommeln in order to have their interpretations of rock music recorded and produced – and to be fed by Dieter Dierks' mother, affectionately called "Mother Dierks". One of the regular clients was Klaus Doldinger with his jazz-rock formation Passport. Their albums Looking Thru (1973), Handmade (1973), Cross-Collateral (1975), and Infinity Machine (1976) were recorded in Stommeln. Their live album Jubilee 1974, a recording of the live show at Rheinhalle, Düsseldorf, was mixed at Dierks Studios.

During those years more than 40 trend-setting albums were produced which considerably elevated the reputation independent German rock and electronic music was enjoying on an international level. Many of those were released on the German labels Pilz, Ohr, and Bacillus, but they were also released in the US, France, Italy, and above all in England. The liner notes almost always featured Dierks Studios and its "sound magician and wizard of tunes" Dieter Dierks as well as a "special thanks" for the creative environment and the great catering by "Mother Dierks" who would cook for the musicians till 2 o'clock in the morning if necessary. Another benefit was that Dieter Dierks had continued fitting his studio facilities with the latest high tech equipment, thus turning them into one of the leading German production sites. Self devised reverb effects, additional experimental instruments like the mellotron, a keyboard that could replay regular tapings of orchestra sounds.

== Studio expansion and international clientele ==
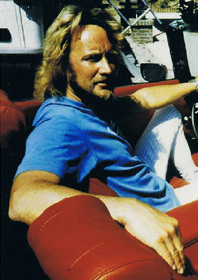
Dieter Dierks

Around 1972 Dieter Dierks expanded further. In order to enable cost-effective pre-productions, the basement of the studio hotel was turned into three small recording studios and a control room bundled as Studio 2. In late 1973 a lounge called "the canteen" planned to be used as a conference room was built in front of Studio 1 as an annex. Eventually the excellent reputation Dierks Studios enjoyed for being a first class recording location had also spread internationally. The company had become an important economic factor for the small town of Stommeln. Bands would often stay there for months, spend money in the shops and in the evenings go to local restaurants and pubs. Journalists would arrive to take photos and do interviews.

The first international band to come from England was Nektar. Between June and August 1971 this quintet recorded their debut album Journey to the Centre of the Eye in Stommeln. They came back to record the albums A Tab in the Ocean (October 1972), the studio live recording ...Sounds Like This (February 1973) and, Remember the Future which in July 1974 reached No. 19 in the US album charts. At the time this album was considered to be the most successful Dierks production so far. In December 1974 Nektar went back to Stommeln for the last time to record Down to Earth. The album went to No. 32 in the US charts and was awarded gold in February 1975.

In 1974 the first audio recording mobile was added to the company's portfolio. Consequently, live performances of renowned international artists such as Al Jarreau, Fats Domino, Oscar Peterson, Harry Belafonte, Michael Chapman, Ella Fitzgerald, The Platters, Brian Auger, Lou Reed, Nana Mouskouri, Santana or Chicago could be recorded. Thanks to his experience with major international artists, their managements and their record companies Dieter Dierks decided to extend his group of companies by launching his own production and publishing firm, Breeze Music. Dierks succeeded in signing one of Germany's leading rock bands called Atlantis featuring the bluesy-voiced singer Inga Rumpf and to produce them on an international level. He got on a plane to America and managed to convince major label Polygram to send the band on a US tour. Together with US manager Ira Blacker he put together a tour for them. The first show supporting Lynyrd Skynyrd took place in Philadelphia in front of an audience of 20 000. A few years later this network should prove very useful for him in connection with Scorpions.

== Scorpions, 1973–1988 ==
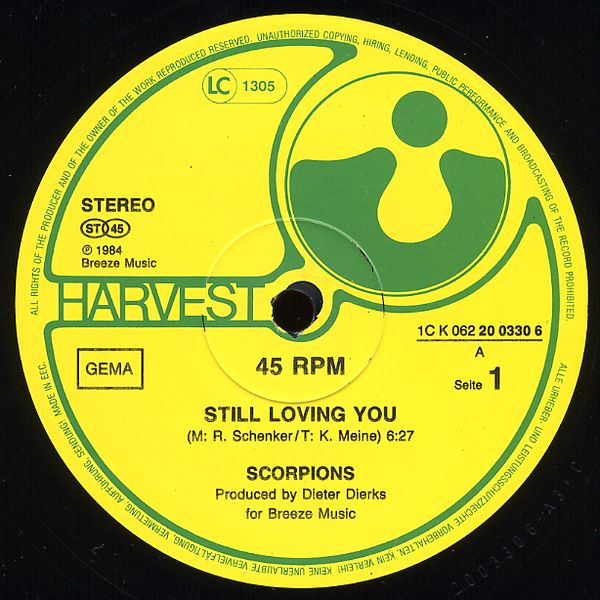
Scorpions – Still Loving You

Back in 1973 Dieter Dierks and his wife Corina Fortmann went to a gig at a local sports hall in Essen where they encountered a totally unknown newcomer rock band, Scorpions. Despite the scarce audience Dierks was impressed by the professional attitude of these musicians. After initially being hired by RCA to produce them, in 1976 he succeeded in signing them to his company, Breeze Music. In Trance, the first album Dierks had produced sold three times as much as their previous releases. Continuous work experience abroad as well as a highly successful Japanese tour, financed by Breeze Music, the recordings of which later released as Tokyo Tapes, led to the band being signed to the Mercury label (Polygram) in the US. Bob Sherwood, then president, was a rock fan and was impressed with the skills of this German producer. David Krebs, a music business "big shot" was appointed personal manager for Scorpions. With the backing of Leber Krebs Management, a company which solely looked after huge acts like AC/DC, Aerosmith or Ted Nugent, the door for Scorpions to debut live in the US was opened wide.

The first Mercury album Lovedrive – featuring an eye-catching chewing gum breast cover, still a controversial issue to date – awarded them their first gold disc (more than 500 000 units) in the US and reaching worldwide sales of 1.5 million copies. In Germany they secured a long-term contract with EMI Electrola, which also included territories like South East Asia. This deal provided the opportunity to produce the Hanover-based rock band on an international level. For Blackout Dierks rented a huge mansion in the South of France which provided a cook and featured an outdoor pool and a tennis court to give them a break from the day-to-day studio routine in Stommeln. At the same time, the Dierks' owned recording mobile was parked on the premises and ready to go. However, Klaus Meine developed a throat infection, so the album could not be recorded. It ended up being done at a later stage at Studio 2 in Stommeln after all. The albums Blackout and Animal Magnetism branded Scorpions to be the leading melodic hard rock band. With painstaking efforts Dieter Dierks had not only created a unique sound, but also established Scorpions as a solid brand among the leading hard rock bands.

Their 1984 album Love at First Sting featuring the hit single ballad "Still Loving You" catapulted Scorpions to the then zenith of their career at the time: 2.5 million copies (double platinum) sold in the US, gold and platinum status almost everywhere in Europe as well as in Japan and South East Asia, territories where the band had advanced to become the most popular rock band of all. However the production of this album had also required two attempts: In the spring of 1983 Dieter Dierks had rented ABBA's renowned Polar Studios. Just before production was due to start Herman Rarebell and Francis Buchholz had both fallen ill. Herman brought along Jimmy Bain as substitute and Rudolf got Bobby Rondinelli involved. But the results were not convincing, so the entire album was re-recorded and mixed again at Dierks Studios – this time featuring the original line-up. It was worth the effort. This album contains most of their hits and it became the best-selling Scorpions album of all times. The live album Worldwide Live, released in 1985 was a compilation of highlights of their shows during their world tour.

The eight Scorpions albums of the Dierks era can justifiably be considered to be the essence of the band's work. For Dierks, too – every now and then nicknamed "the sixth member of Scorpions" – these albums were the most successful ones in his career as a producer. While working on Savage Amusement, the last album that was produced in Stommeln, differences in opinion between the band and the producer emerged. As a consequence the production contract was not renewed and the collaboration ended in November 1988. Drummer Herman Rarebell reflected in 2011: "For Scorpions Dieter was the right man in the right place. The more his influence within the band grew the more our record sales increased. This intimacy however also caused contempt because with his growing influence discrepancies between the band members were flaring up. At the end of the day, though, he did manage to soothe all the egos and succeeded in steering the band into one direction."

== Further studio expansion and motion picture technology ==
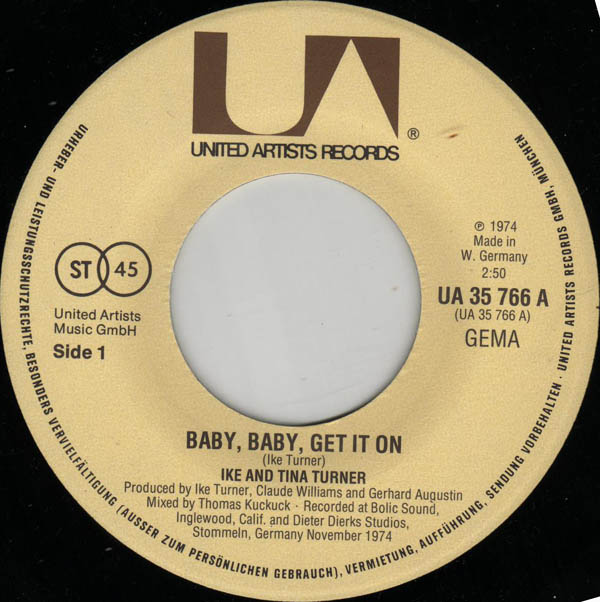
Ike & Tina Turner – Baby, Baby, Get It On

Thanks to the success with the Scorpions the company Breeze Music was able to secure long-term contracts with major American and European record labels and music publishing companies. So, the expansion plans were apt to continue. Thanks to Dierks Studios excellent reputation more international top stars were flocking to Stommeln: Ike & Tina Turner, Eric Burdon, War, The Boomtown Rats, Dokken, and Irish rock and blues musician Rory Gallagher. Most of them visited more than once. Gallagher preferred to work during the night and recorded two consecutive albums there. He even started a dart club at the pub next door.

In 1985 Studio 3, the biggest studio complex so far, was built. This facility with its vast space offered enough room for orchestras, choirs and big bands. Thanks to its mobile camera and lighting rigs as well as its highly efficient air conditioning system it was also designed for film and video recordings and conformed to the standard of American mega studios. Since all facilities were connected via a subterranean corridor it was possible to switch around and use the entire technical equipment range of all three studios. At the same time the canteen located between Studio 1 and the studio kitchen was enlarged as well. Deep Purple's keyboardist Jon Lord produced his first solo album Sarabande using the Dierks Studios mobile recording facilities. Meanwhile, major US record companies chose Dierks to produce their artists. Among them were Geffen Records' glam metal band Black 'n Blue, heavy metal rockers Twisted Sister who Dierks produced in New York and Los Angeles for Atlantic Records, and Capitol Records' New York punk avant-garde group Plasmatics. US band Mother's Finest recorded a live album with Dieter Dierks as well, using the audio and video mobile with the mixing being done afterwards at Studio 3. In 1986 the Dierks Studios Mobile 1 – put into action all around Europe to record concerts of renowned artists and having proved to be of good use for live broadcasts of the WDR channel shows Rock Palast and Rocknächte – was replaced with Mobile 2, a unit of almost twice the size. This mobile featured analogue and digital recording devices, a computerised mixing console, a state-of-the-art auditory system and, a big lounge area. In 1991 this mobile studio was used to record a Rolling Stones live album in Moscow and other European cities.

Eventually the studio hotel ended up being too small for long-term international residents. So in 1986 Dierks bought a mansion with huge gardens – suitable for long-term stays – in Bruchstraße, around two kilometres away from the studios. This was a place where musicians could stay in a relaxed atmosphere and enjoy creative breaks during long recording periods.

In 1987, after having finished the Studio 3 expansion, Dierks decided to consolidate the base of his group of companies on a long-term basis by concentrating further on the moving picture side, a division of the company, which had been growing steadily. So far only Studio 3 offered facilities for film and video recording. Therefore, a video recording mobile was needed. With the help of experts, an outside broadcasting unit was bought from Westdeutscher Rundfunk (radio and TV channel), fitted with the latest state-of-the art equipment and transformed into a giant mobile. Dierks Studios' first video unit, Mobile 1, was ready for action in 1988. In 1991 Studio 1 and Studio 2 were completely refurbished and the technical equipment was brought up to date. This enabled simultaneous production processes of equal rank in Studio 3 and Studio 1. 1992 the temporarily disbanded group Accept got back together and produced three more albums for Breeze Music.

During the mid nineties rock music gradually lost its attraction. The meanwhile domineering techno and dance music style came into being. This music no longer needed to be produced in big studios. With the help of computers and electronic devices it could be done in small "living-room-style" studios. The Dierks group of companies adapted itself to this development, and in 1995 added two new hard disc studios, namely Studio 4 and Studio 5. With this new cutting-edge computer technology, an ideal work environment for dance, house and techno music projects had been created.

In 1996 Michael Jackson recorded the song Ghosts at Studio 3, which was released on his Blood on the Dance Floor: HIStory in the Mix album in May 1997 and was later put on the Deluxe Collector Box Set – Limited Edition. At the Stommeln-based studios – on the cover incorrectly credited as "Diederdierk Studio (Cologne, Germany)" – vocals and drum programming were recorded. The collaboration with the King of Pop continued during the HIStory world tour with Dierks recording two shows at the Munich Olympiahalle using twelve analogue cameras as well as six digital ones. One of his two new digital mobile units which had been purchased in 1996 respectively 1997 was used for this job. The units in question were 18 meters long, respectively 21 meters long mobile recording units, transported on elaborate trucks, extensible in width and equipped with the latest digital equipment, picture direction monitors and mixing consoles. With up to twelve cameras on board they were able to record huge events. After the Jackson recordings the units came into action to tape the DOME shows for RTL II TV, the Bravo Supershow, the Sabine Christiansen Talkshow as well as the Pope John Paul II trip to Austria in June 1998. Several mobile units featuring HDTV technology were added to the fleet in 1997. This technology produced extremely high-resolution images by using special cameras and was particularly popular with the technology-affined customers from the US and Japan who tended to order numerous classical recordings. The Kirch Group for example booked these units for the recording of the Wagner Festival in Bayreuth.

In 1997 the former engineering lab and the lobby of Studio 3 were turned into a new video-editing studio (avid room) in order to be capable of handling the numerous mixing and cutting jobs that came in. With its in-house avid editing suite, recorded images could be edited, mixed and processed.

Today, having undergone several stages of restructuring the Dierks Studios group of companies is currently positioned as follows:

- The "Edit-Suite" is used as editing and screening room, colour grading, colour matching and colour corrections as well as the restoring of movies... all this can be done in 4K and HD.
- Studio 1 will be turned into a 4K screening room sized 100 square meters with a seating capacity for 30 people. This studio, too, provides facilities for restoration work, colour corrections and colour grading.
- Studio 3 combines analogue and digital recording technology. For sound analogue recording it is used however with a digital surface/solid state console meets D command – analogue warmth and digital speed go hand in hand.
- Studio 4 and 5 are used for dubbing, pre-production respectively song writing and composing. In these studios ideas can be garnered, notes can be outlined, and the results can subsequently get their finishing touches in Studio 3.
- Studio 6 and 7 will be made into picture editing and conversion facilities where for example 2D can be transformed into 3D.

== New activities beyond music production ==
In 1997 Dieter Dierks launched the company Breeze TV GmbH that with its so-called P.O.S. (point of sale) TV was set to promote consumer goods via TV screens installed in retail outlets. In cooperation with economist Hagen Backhaus, Dierks succeeded in securing a long-term contract with the Schlecker drugstore chain, which at the time had more than 8,000 affiliates in Germany, Austria and other countries. The deal involved the constant broadcasting of TV commercials in continuous loops on three screens installed in each outlet. This way the commercials could reach more than two million shoppers in Germany alone. For the Dierks group of companies Breeze TV's activities meant that the supply chain and the service cycle from the production of sound and image carriers to the sale of such, had turned into a full circle.

In 1999 Dierks took out a patent on DVDplus (trademark: DVD [plus]). The DVD [plus] patent is a combination of a DVD with a regular CD, which by bonding enables double-sided play back of the sound and the image carrier. While for example the golden side of the DVD plays a film or a live concert, it plays a soundtrack, a music score or previously unreleased live recordings on the silver flip side. In order to ensure the exploitation of this patent, in 1999 Dieter Dierks managed to secure a deal with the biggest CD and DVD manufacturing equipment producer Singulus Technologies. Sony USA is using the Dierks licence under the trading name of DualDisc. Meanwhile, several national and international top artists have had DVDplus respectively DualDisc products produced, among them Herbert Grönemeyer, Die Toten Hosen, Michael Jackson (a whole box set), Santana, Emerson, Lake & Palmer, Steve Harley, Nightwish, Bruce Springsteen, Destiny's Child, AC/DC (more than 500,000 copies of Back in Black sold in the US alone), Aerosmith, and many others. But also football clubs like Bayern Munich or the film company which released "The Blairwitch Project 2" are using the new format. The DVDplus of said movie sold more than 600,000 copies. So far several million sound image carriers have been produced in total. On the DVDplus website 122 different releases are listed. However, during the process of implementing the format, the fact that different companies often owned the copyright for image and sound, proved to be an impediment.

In 2001 Dierks' group of companies consisted of

- the Breeze TV GmbH being the biggest division of the group with its 50 employees covering the areas POS TV, direct marketing, e-commerce and online sales
- the video mobile division with its video mobile units 1 – 4, the "film like" and "slomo" van
- the recording division with then seven studios, whereby Studio 3 was at the time equipped for super audio (SACD) mixes in 5 channel dolby surround sound
- the Breeze Dance Division which succeeded in constantly increasing their artist roster
- the production and music publishing companies Breeze Music and
- the record label Venus Records which worked on the use of existing repertoire and the production of new compilations placed with major record labels in Germany

== Significance ==
During his career Dieter Dierks produced more than 70 albums, several of which reached gold or platinum status. Apart from his commercial success this "creative tinkerer" is also prominent thanks to his willingness to try out new things and his knack for technological innovation. In 2013 Christoph Wagner wrote: "Dieter Dierks as well as Conny Plank both made substantial contributions in establishing and consolidating an independent German rock music market. Thanks to the power of their imagination and their creativity these very new sounds were able to emerge. These sounds gave German rock music its own identity. At the same time both their studios served as an artistic medium". US music magazine Rolling Stone described Dierks as "the best heavy metal producer of the world" and as far back as 1974 for the magazine "Der Spiegel" he was already then considered to be "the leading German rock music producer."

== Productions ==
The role describes Dieter Dierks' share in the productions:

- P = Producer
- E = Engineer
- S = Studio owner
- CO = Content owner
- C = Composer
- AR = Arranger
- ME = Mixing Engineer
- RE = Remix Engineer
- A = Artist

Year	Artist	Title	Role	Recording	Release
1969	Ihre Kinder	Ihre Kinder	E	July–August 1969	Phillips
1970	Hairy Chapter	Eyes	P/E	January 1969	Second Battle
1970	Embryo	Opal	P/E	April 1970	Ohr
1970	Orange Peel	Orange Peel	E		Bellaphon
1971	Tangerine Dream	Alpha Centauri	E	January 1971	Ohr (April 1971)
1971	Hairy Chapter	Can't Get Through	P/E	November 1970 – January 1971	Bacillus
1971	Dull Knife (band)	Electric Indian	E		Phillips
1971	Embryo	Embryo's Rache	E		United Artists
1971	Epsilon	Move On	E		Bacillus
1971	Frame	Frame of Mind	E		Bacillus
1971	Gila	Gila – Free Electric Sound	E		BASF
1971	Rufus Zuphall	Phallobst	P/E		Ohr
1971	Witthüser & Westrupp	Trips und Träume	E	March 1971	Ohr
1971	Witthüser & Westrupp	Der Jesus-Pilz	E	August 1971	Pilz
1971	Krokodil	An Invisible World Revealed	E		United Artists
1971	Wallenstein	Blitzkrieg	Co-P/E	October 1971	Pilz
1971	Nektar	Journey to the Centre of the Eye	E		Bellaphon
1971	Bröselmaschine	Bröselmaschine	E	August 1971	Pilz
1971	Epsilon	Epsilon	E	1971	Bellaphon
1971	Nine Days Wonder	Nine Days Wonder	E	1971	Bacillus
1971	Marz & Eperjessy	Marz & Eperjessy	E		Bacillus
1972	Tangerine Dream	Zeit	E		Ohr (January 1972)
1972	Hoelderlin	Hoelderlins Traum	E	January 1972	Pilz
1972	Jerry Berkers	Unterwegs	P/E/A		Ohr
1972	Ash Ra Tempel	Schwingungen	E	January 1972	Ohr
1972	Massage	The Dawn Anew Is Coming	E		Bacillus
1972	Emtidi	Saat	P/E	January 1972	Pilz
1972	Ash Ra Tempel with Timothy Leary	Seven Up	E/ME/A	1972	Metronome
1972	Annexus Quam	Beziehungen	E	May 1972	Metronome
1972	Witthüser & Westrupp	Bauer Plath	Co-P/E	June–July 1972	Pilz
1972	Demon Thor	Anno 1972	Co-P/E		United Artists
1972	Jeronimo	Time Ride	E	March 1972	Bellaphon
1972	Nektar	A Tab in the Ocean	E		Bellaphon
1972	Midnight Circus	Midnight Circus	E		Bacillus
1972	Pell Mell	Marburg	P/E	1972	Bellaphon
1972	Twenty Sixty Six and Then	Reflections of the Future	E		United Artists
1972	Walpurgis	Queen of Saba	E	1972	Ohr
1972	Wind	Morning	E		CBS
1972	Electric Sandwich	Electric Sandwich	P/E		Brain
1972	Wallenstein	Mother Universe	Co-P/E	June 1972	Pilz
1972	Passport	Second Passport	E		Atlantic
1972	Floh de Cologne	Lucky Streik	P/E	November 1972	Ohr
1972	Walter Wegmüller	Tarot	P/E/A	December 1972	Cosmic Couriers
1972	Marz	The Dream Is Over	E		Bellaphon
1972	Mythos	Mythos	E	1972	Ohr
1973	Tangerine Dream	Atem	E	December 1972 – January 1973	Ohr (March 1973)
1973	Lily	V.C.U.	E/A	January 1973	Bacillus
1973	Cosmic Jokers	Galactic Joke	P/E	January – May 1973	Cosmic Couriers
1973	Omega	Omega	E	April 73	Bacillus
1973	Ash Ra Tempel and Klaus Schulze	Join Inn	E	December 72	Ohr
1973	Ash Ra Tempel	Starring Rosi	E	1973	Cosmic Couriers
1973	Embryo	Rocksession	E		Brain/Metronome
1973	Jane	Here We Are		1973	Metronome
1973	Message	From Books and Dreams			
1973	Nektar	...Sounds Like This	E	1973	Bellaphon
1973	Walter Wegmüller	Tarot	E	1973	Ohr
1973	Passport	Looking Thru	E	October 1973	WEA
1973	Passport	Handmade	E		WEA
1973	Birth Control	Rebirth	E	November 1973	CBS
1973	Tommy Fortmann	Sunshine in Deep Darkness	P	1973	United Artist
1973	Nektar	Remember the Future	RE	September 1973	Bellaphon
1973	Chris Braun Band	Foreign Lady	P/E	November 1973	Ariola
1973	Jeremy B.	This Is My Life	E	1973	Bacillus
1973	Gila	Bury My Heart at Wounded Knee	E	1973	WEA
1973	Wallenstein	Cosmic Century	Co-P	1973	Ohr
1973	Witthüser & Westrupp	Live 68–73	E	1968–1973	Ohr
1974	Demon Thor	Written in the Sky	P/E	November 1974	United Artists
1974	Jay C. Corry	Love Me Or Leave Me	P/E/AR	1974	Metronome
1974	Sergius Golowin	Lord Krishna von Goloka	E	1974	Ohr
1974	Grobschnitt	Ballermann	E	January 1974	Brain/Metronome
1974	Santiago	New Guitar	P/E/AR	1974	BASF
1974	Cosmic Jokers	Planeten Sit-In	P/E/A	1974	Cosmic Couriers
1974	Cosmic Jokers und Klaus Schulze	Galactic Supermarket	P/E/A	1974	Cosmic Couriers
1974	Cosmic Jokers	Sci-Fi Party	P/E/A		Cosmic Couriers
1974	Atlantis	Ooh, Baby	P/E/AR	1974	Polydor/Phonogram
1974	Birth Control	Live	E/M	August 1974	CBS
1974	Passport	Jubilee Concert 1974	E/R	16. October 1973	WEA
1974	Ike & Tina Turner	Baby, Baby, Get It On (Single)	E	November 1974	United Artists
1974	Popol Vuh	Seligpreisung	E	1974	Cosmic Couriers
1974	Nektar	Down to Earth	E/RE	March – June 1974	Bellaphon
1974	Tea	Tea	P/E/AR	1974	Vertigo
1974	A Meditation Mass	A Meditation Mass	E/RE		Brain
1974	Cosmic Jokers	Tarot	E/A		Cosmic Couriers
1974	Manuel Göttsching	Inventions for Electric Guitar	E/M	August 1974	Cosmic Couriers
1974	Floh de Cologne	Geyer Symphonie	E/P	December 1973	Ohr
1975	Tea	The Ship	P/E/AR	1971–1973	Phonogram
1975	Wallenstein	Stories, Songs & Symphonies	S		Pilz
1975	Eric Burdon Band	Stop	P/E	1971–1973	(July 1975)
1975	Can	Landed (Track #1–#4)	ME	1975	Virgin UK
1975	Inga Rumpf	Second-Hand Mädchen	P/E/AR	1975	Phonogram
1975	Scorpions	In Trance	P/E/AR	1975	RCA Records
1975	Passport	Cross-Collateral	E	1975	WEA
1975	Galaxy	Nature's Clear Well	P/E/AR	1975	Venus-Records
1975	Heidelinde Weis	So sing ich		1975	Intercord
1975	Klaus Doldinger	Doldinger Jubilee 75	E/M	1975	Atlantic/WEA
1975	Atlantis	Atlantis Live	P/E	1973–1975	Vertigo
1975	Atlantis	Get on Board	P/E/AR	1975	Vertigo
1975	Lammers / Gong	Out in the Garden / Woman	P/E/AR	1975	Monopol-Records
1976	Embryo	Bad Heads and Bad Cats	E	1975	April (April 1976)
1976	Schicke Führs Fröhling	Symphonic Pictures	P/E/AR	1976	Brain
1976	Passport	Infinity Machine	E	January 1976	Atlantic/WEA
1976	Scorpions	Virgin Killer	P/E/AR	1976	RCA Records
1976	Jay C. Corry	Love Me or Leave Me	Co-P	1976	Metronome
1976	Jackie Carter	Treat Me Like a Woman	P/E/AR	1976	Atlantic/WEA
1976	Lady	Lady	P/E	May 1976	Vertigo
1976	Jon Lord	Sarabande	S	3–6 September 1976	Purple
1976	Atlantis	Top of the Bill	P/E/AR	1975	Venus Records
1976	Edmundo	Let's Spend the Night Together (Single)	P/E/AR	1976	Big Mouth
1976	Midnight Special	Dance, Mama, Dance	P/E/AR	1976	Big Mouth
1977	Eric Burdon	Survivor	RE	1977	Polydor
1977	Scorpions	Taken by Force	P/E/AR	1977	RCA Records
1977	Schicke Führs Fröhling	Sunburst	P/E/AR	1977	Brain/Metronome
1977	Wallenstein	No More Love	S	1977	RCA Records
1977	Nektar	Thru The Ears	E	1977	Bellaphon
1977	Various Artists (Udo Lindenberg/Alexis Korner/Jürgen Drews et al.)	Tell! (Musical)	P/E/AR		Teldec
1977	Tommy Fortmann	Piccolo Mondo / Old Fashioned Movie	P/E	1977	Hansa Records
1978	Schicke Führs Fröhling	Ticket to Everywhere	P/E/AR	1978	Metronome
1978	Scorpions	Tokyo Tapes	P/E	1978	RCA Records
1978	Rory Gallagher	Photo-Finish	S		Polydor (1. October 1978)
1979	Scorpions	Lovedrive	P/AR	1979	EMI/Polygram
1979	Wolfgang Ambros	Live... auf ana langen finster'n Stroß'n (Live)	S	April 1979	
1979	Rory Gallagher	Top Priority	S		(16. September 1979)
1979	Skin	Hot Skin	P/E/AR	1979	EMI
1980	Scorpions	Animal Magnetism	P/AR		EMI/Polygram
1981	Hoelderlin	Fata Morgana	ME		
1981	Toy	The Split	CO		EMI
1981	Bullet	Execution	P/E/AR	1981	Polydor
1981	Vic Vergat	Down to the Bone	P/E/AR	1981	Electrola
1982	Revolver	First Shot	P/E/AR	1982	Polydor
1982	Scorpions	Blackout	P/E/AR	1982	Electrola
1982	Rory Gallagher	Jinx	S		Chrysalis (2. May 1982)
1982	The Plasmatics	Coup d' État	P/AR		
1982	Accept	Restless and Wild	CO		Metronome
1982	Warning	Warning II	P/E/AR		Polydor France
1983	Accept	Balls to the Wall	CO		RCA/CBS (June 1982)
1984	Black 'n Blue	Black 'n Blue	P/E/AR/CO	3. April 1984	Geffen
1984	Bullet	No Mercy	P/E/AR		Polydor
1984	Scorpions	Love at First Sting	P/E/AR	1984	Electrola/Polygram
1985	Accept	Metal Heart (#6)	P/AR	10. December 1982	RCA (24. May 1985)
1985	Twisted Sister	Come Out and Play	P/AR		WEA (9. November 1985)
1985	Scorpions	World Wide Live	P	1984–1985	Electrola/Polygram
1986	Accept	Russian Roulette	CO		RCA/CBS (March 1986)
1987	Die Toten Hosen	Bis zum bitteren Ende	S		Virgin
1988	Scorpions	Savage Amusement	P/AR	1988	Electrola/Polygram
1988	Joshua	Intense Defense	S	1988	RCA
1989	Accept	Eat the Heat	P/E/AR	1989	RCA/CBS
1990	Die Toten Hosen	Auf dem Kreuzzug ins Glück	S		Virgin (21. May 1990)
1990	New Legend	New Legend	P/AR		BMG
1991	Die Toten Hosen	Learning English Lesson One	S		TOT / Virgin (11. November 1991)
1992	Ina Deter	Ver-Rückte Zeiten	E/ME/S	10. December 1992	RCA
1993	Die Toten Hosen	Kauf MICH!	S		TOT, Virgin (10. May 1993)
1993	Wolf Maahn	Direkt ins Blut – (Unplugged)	S	22. June 1993	Electrola (16. December 1993)
1996	Die Toten Hosen	Opium fürs Volk	S		JKP / EastWest (26. January 1996)
1996	Scorpions	Still Loving You (#7)	P/E		from: Various Artists (OST): Bordello of Blood, Mercury Rec.
1996	Die Toten Hosen	Im Auftrag des Herrn	S		JKP / EastWest (28. October 1996)
1997	Scorpions	Bad for Good	P/AR	1997	from: Deadly Sting: The Mercury Years, Mercury Records
1997	Scorpions	Lovedrive (remastered)	P		EMI
1997	Scorpions	Animal Magnetism (remastered)	P		EMI
1997	Scorpions	Blackout (remastered)	P		EMI
1997	Scorpions	Love at First Sting (remastered)	P		EMI
1997	Scorpions	World Wide Live (remastered)	P		EMI
1997	Michael Jackson	Ghosts from Blood on the Dance Floor	S		CBS (20. May 1997)
1998	Black 'n Blue	Hold on to 18 (#2)	P/CO		from: Various Artists: Geffen Vintage 80s Presents: It Rocks!! Geffen Records
1998	Bullet	Down By The Neonlights (#9)	P	13. October 1998	from: Various Artists: Heard It on the Radio: FM Hits, Vol.1, Renaissance Rec.
1998	Die Toten Hosen	Wir warten auf's Christkind...	S		JKP / EastWest
1999	Scorpions	Rock You Like a Hurricane (#10)			from: Various Artists: Jawbreaker (OST), London Records
1999	Die Toten Hosen	Unsterblich	S	August – November 1999	JKP / EastWest (6. December 1999)
1999	Elisabeth White	Maybe God's a Woman Too	S		Wagram/BMG
2001	T. V. Smith	Useless	S		JKP (9. April 2001)
2001	Black 'n Blue	Ultimate Collection (Tracks #2/3/4/17/19/20)	CO		Universal/Geffen Records
2002	Die Toten Hosen	Auswärtsspiel	S		JKP / EastWest (21. January 2002)
2005	Nisha Kataria	If You Want to Be Mine	P/AR		tba
2007	Wolf Maahn	Direkt ins Blut 2 – (Un)plugged	S		Libero/Rough Trade (28. November 2007)
2008	Tommy Fortmann	Krieger der Nacht	P		tba
2025	Flying Circus	The Eternal Moment	E	March – April 2025	
