= Sunday Night at London Roundhouse =

Sunday Night at the London Roundhouse

Live album by Nektar
- Released: May 1974
- Recorded: 25 November 1973 (Side one); 27 March 1974 (Side two)
- Venue: London Roundhouse (Side one); Chipping Norton Studios (Side two)
- Genre: Progressive rock
- Length: 36:55
- Label: Bacillus
- Producer: Peter Hauke

Nektar chronology
Remember the Future (1973)	Sunday Night at the London Roundhouse (1974)	Down to Earth (1974)

Sunday Night at the London Roundhouse was the first live album by the English progressive rock band Nektar. It was released on vinyl in 1974 by Bacillus Records, and re-released with partially different content on CD in 2002.

The album was recorded in November 1973 at a disused railroad building that had become a gin warehouse.

== Original release ==
The 1974 vinyl release included only two songs recorded at the concert given by the band at the Roundhouse, Chalk Farm, London, on 25 November 1973: "Desolation Valley" and "A Day in the Life of a Preacher", which included rough edits.

Side 2 was recorded at a live-in-studio jam on March 27, 1974, between the hours of 2:00 am and 5:00 am, at Chipping Norton Studios in Oxfordshire, England. An expanded recording of the jam session was later released as a separate CD under the title Unidentified Flying Abstract - Live at Chipping Norton 1974.

=== Track listing ===
Side one
No.	Title	Original album	Length
1.	"Desolation Valley (Note: Although not listed, also includes "Waves")"	A Tab in the Ocean	9:50
2.	"A Day in the Life of a Preacher (featuring the birth of Oh Willie)"	...Sounds Like This	11:30

Professional ratings
Review scores
Source	Rating
Allmusic	Link

Side two
No.	Title	Length
3.	"Oop's (Unidentified Flying Abstract)"	6:37
4.	"Mundetango"	6:25
5.	"Summer Breeze"	2:40

== 2002 re-release ==
The 2002 release on CD featured the complete Roundhouse concert, recorded by Pye Records Mobile Studio and engineered by Vic Maile. All the tracks were mixed from the original 16-track master tapes by Paschal Byrne, Roye Albrighton, and Mark Powell at the Audio Archiving Company, London in March 2002. The Chipping Norton Studios 1974 material (side two) was removed, but included on Unidentified Flying Abstract, also released in 2002.

=== Track listing ===
Disc one
No.	Title	Original album	Length
1.	"Crying in the Dark/King of Twilight"	A Tab in the Ocean	12:10
2.	"Desolation Valley/Waves"	A Tab in the Ocean	8:58
3.	"A Day in the Life of a Preacher (inc. The Birth of Oh Willy)"	...Sounds Like This	19:50
4.	"Summer Breeze"		3:04
5.	"Cast Your Fate"	...Sounds Like This	5:42

Disc two
No.	Title	Original album	Length
1.	"Remember the Future, Part 1"	Remember the Future	18:47
2.	"Odyssee (Ron's On)"	...Sounds Like This	11:15
3.	"1-2-3-4"	...Sounds Like This	12:31
4.	"Remember the Future, Part 2 (Let it Grow)"	Remember the Future	5:14
5.	"What Ya Gonna Do?"	...Sounds Like This	6:09

== 2002 release Unidentified Flying Abstract ==
Includes the three songs from the original side two, but removed from the 2002 reissue, plus three addition songs recorded during the jam on March 27, 1974.

Live at Chipping Norton 1974
No.	Title	Length
1.	"Desolation Valley"	9:06
2.	"Oop's - Unidentified Flying Abstract (Note: Originally released on side two of Sunday Night at London Roundhouse)"	6:02
3.	"Mundetango"	6:38
4.	"One Mile Red / The Ticket"	9:51
5.	"We Must Have Been Smashed"	6:31
6.	"Summer Breeze"	2:48

== Personnel ==
- Roye Albrighton - guitar, vocals
- Alan "Taff" Freeman - synthesizer, keyboards, vocals
- Derek "Mo" Moore - bass, vocals
- Ron Howden - percussion, drums, vocals, Smurds
- Mick Brockett - lights
