= Remember the Future =

Remember the Future may refer to:

- Remember the Future (Nektar album), 1973
- Remember the Future (Jonna Lee album), 2019
