= Time Machine (Nektar album) =

Studio album by Nektar
- Released: July 18, 2013
- Studio: Sherwood Studios
- Length: 1:06:48
- Label: Cleopatra Records

Nektar chronology
A Spoonful of Time (2012)	Time Machine (2013)	The Other Side (2020)

Original unused cover

Time Machine is the thirteenth studio album by the progressive rock band, Nektar. It was their first album of new material in over four years following Book of Days. Their previous release A Spoonful of Time had only covers. It is final studio album to feature Roye Albrighton before his death in July 2016.

== Track listing ==
All songs written by Roye Albrighton, unless indicated otherwise.

1. "A Better Way" – 9:17
2. "Set Me Free, Amigo" – 5:01*
3. "Destiny" – 5:16*
4. "If Only I Could" – 9:55
5. "Time Machine" – 8:06
6. "Tranquility" – 5:06
7. "Mocking the Moon" (Barbel Craven, Klaus Henatsch) – 5:24
8. "Talk to Me" (Ron Howden) – 3:55*
9. "Juggernaut" – 4:37
10. "Diamond Eyes" – 10:14

Note: (*) CD/digital-only tracks; not on vinyl LP.

== Personnel ==
=== Nektar ===
- Roye Albrighton – guitars, vocals
- Ron Howden – drums, vocals
- Klaus Henatsch – keyboards
- Billy Sherwood – bass

=== Production ===
- Brian Perera – executive producer
- Billy Sherwood – engineer, mixer
- Roye Albrighton – mixer
- Maor Appelbaum – mastering
