= Recycled (album) =

Studio album by Nektar
- Released: October 1975 (Germany); January 1976 (US); January 1977 (UK)
- Recorded: July – August 1975
- Studio: Château d'Hérouville, Val-d'Oise, France and Air Studios, London
- Genre: Progressive rock
- Length: 36:49
- Label: Bacillus (Germany); Passport Records (US); Decca (UK)
- Producer: Peter Hauke, Nektar

Nektar chronology
Down to Earth (1974)	Recycled (1975)	Live in New York (1977)

Recycled is the sixth album from the English progressive rock band Nektar. It is a concept album addressing the band members' concerns about the environment. There are only two songs on the album, one for each side, titled simply "Part One" and "Part Two". "Part One" tells the tale of a nightmarish future in which only "recycled energy" remains, while "Part Two" revolves around more present-day concerns about tourism despoiling untouched wilderness.

== Reception ==
Professional ratings
Review scores
Source	Rating
Allmusic	2/5 stars

Allmusic gave the album a mixed retrospective review. They criticized the album as lacking the instrumental prowess, enthusiasm, and band cohesion that the players had shown on Nektar's previous albums. However, they acknowledged that "What does hold strong is Nektar's ability to conjure up a science-fiction atmosphere through the unorthodox application of percussion, guitar, and keyboards."

== Track listing ==
All songs written and arranged by Nektar.

Side one
No.	Title	Length
1.	"Recycled, Part One" a. "Recycle" b. "Cybernetic Consumption" c. "Recycle Countdown" d. "Automaton Horrorscope" e. "Recycling" f. "Flight to Reality" g. "Unendless Imagination?"	17:39 2:45 2:10 1:52 3:03 1:51 1:19 4:39

Side two
No.	Title	Length
1.	"Recycled, Part Two" a. "São Paulo Sunrise" b. "Costa del Sol" c. "Marvellous Moses" d. "It's All Over"	19:10 3:05 4:03 6:35 5:27

== Credits ==
- Roye Albrighton - lead vocals, guitars
- Mick Brockett - visual environment
- Alan "Taff" Freeman - keyboards, backing vocals
- Ron Howden - drums, percussion
- Derek "Mo" Moore - bass, backing vocals

Additional personnel

- Larry Fast - Moog synthesizer
- The English Chorale conducted by Robert Howes, arranged by Christian Kolonovits

== Charts ==
Chart (1976)	Peak position
US Billboard 200	89

Chart (2024)	Peak position
UK Progressive Albums (OCC)	16
