= Down to Earth (Nektar album) =

Studio album by Nektar
- Released: October 1974
- Recorded: March – June 1974
- Studios: Chipping Norton Studio, Chipping Norton, Oxfordshire, England
- Genre: Progressive rock
- Length: 37:13
- Label: Bacillus
- Producers: Peter Hauke, Nektar

Nektar chronology
Sunday Night at London Roundhouse (1974)	Down to Earth (1974)	Recycled (1975)

Professional ratings
Review scores
Source	Rating
Allmusic	link

Down to Earth is the fifth album from English progressive rock band Nektar. A snippet of the song "Show Me the Way" was featured in a first season episode of the sitcom The Jeffersons.

== Track listing ==
All tracks are written by Nektar.

Side one
No.	Title	Length
1.	"Astral Man"	3:15
2.	"Nelly the Elephant"	4:57
3.	"Early Morning Clown"	3:22
4.	"That's Life"	6:52

Side two
No.	Title	Length
5.	"Fidgety Queen"	4:05
6.	"Oh Willy"	4:02
7.	"Little Boy"	3:04
8.	"Show Me the Way"	5:55
9.	"Finale"	1:41

== Personnel ==
- Roye Albrighton - guitar, lead vocals
- Mick Brockett - lights
- Allan "Taff" Freeman - keyboards, backing vocals
- Ron Howden - drums, percussion
- Derek "Mo" Moore - bass, backing vocals

Guests:

- P. P. Arnold - backing vocals
- Phil Brown - bass tuba
- Robert Calvert - ringmaster
- Ron Carthy - 2nd trumpet
- Kenneth Cole - backing vocals
- Steve Gregory - tenor saxophone
- Butch Hudson - 1st trumpet
- Chris Mercer - baritone & tenor saxophones
- Chris Pyne - trombone
- Stephen Wick - tuba
- Dieter Dierks - special effects
- Chipping Norton Mandies - choir (2–9)

== Production ==
- Produced By Peter Hauke & Nektar
- Recorded & Engineered By Barry Hammond

== Charts ==
Chart (1974–75)	Peak position
Australian Albums (Kent Music Report)	93
Canada Top Albums/CDs (RPM)	37
US Billboard 200	32
