= Man in the Moon (Nektar album) =

1980 studio album by Nektar

Studio album by Nektar
- Released: July 1980
- Recorded: January – March 1980
- Studio: Briar Book Studies, Bernardsville, New Jersey and Essex Studios, London
- Genre: Progressive rock, hard rock
- Length: 40:19
- Label: Ariola
- Producer: Roye Albrighton, Rupert Hine

Nektar chronology
More Live Nektar in New York (1978)	Man in the Moon (1980)	The Prodigal Son (2001)

Professional ratings
Review scores
Source	Rating
AllMusic	2.5/5 stars

Man in the Moon is the eighth studio album by Nektar and was originally released in 1980 in Germany. This album continues the commercial hard rock with elements of progressive rock explored on their previous effort Magic Is a Child. Following that album Nektar broke up, and by the time of Man in the Moon they had reunited with a drastically different lineup; only keyboardist Allan "Taff" Freeman remained from the pre-breakup lineup. Founding members Ron Howden and Mo Moore were replaced by David Prater and Carmine Rojas, while Dave Nelson was replaced by founding member Roye Albrighton. The album was expanded to include previously unreleased tracks and re-issued by Voiceprint in Europe.

== Track listing ==
Side one
No.	Title	Writer(s)	Length
1.	"Too Young to Die"	Nektar, Roye Albrighton, Allan Freeman	4:20
2.	"Angel"	Nektar, Albrighton	3:31
3.	"Telephone"	Freeman, Carmine Rojas, Albrighton	3:44
4.	"Far Away"	Albrighton	3:21
5.	"Torraine"	Nektar, Albrighton, Freeman	5:28

Side two
No.	Title	Writer(s)	Length
6.	"Can't Stop You Now"	Nektar, Albrighton	4:22
7.	"We"	Nektar, Albrighton	4:41
8.	"You're Alone"	Albrighton	4:09
9.	"Man in the Moon"	Albrighton, Freeman	6:43

2002 Voiceprint bonus tracks
No.	Title	Writer(s)	Length
10.	"Impossible Years" (Too Young to Die Original Mix)	Nektar, Albrighton, Freeman	4:16
11.	"Straight Jacket"	Albrighton	3:48

== Personnel ==
- Roye Albrighton – guitars, lead vocals, background vocals
- Allan "Taff" Freeman – keyboards
- Carmine Rojas – bass, keyboards
- David Prater – drums, background vocals
