= The Other Side (Nektar album) =

Studio album by Nektar
- Released: 24 January 2020
- Genre: Progressive rock
- Length: 66:06
- Label: Esoteric Antenna

Nektar chronology
Time Machine (2013)	The Other Side (2020)	Mission to Mars (2024)

Professional ratings
Review scores
Source	Rating
AllMusic	4.3/5 stars

The Other Side is the fourteenth album by progressive rock band Nektar, released in 2020. It was the first studio album since 1977's Magic Is a Child to feature original bassist Derek "Mo" Moore. It also features the return of Mick Brockett on special effects, Randy Dembo on rhythm guitar, and Ryche Chlanda on lead guitar. Dembo had previously appeared on Evolution and Chlanda had briefly played with the band in 1978. It is also the last studio album by longtime drummer Ron Howden who died on September 29, 2023.

Several tracks such as "Skywriter" (formerly "Skypilot") and "Devil's Door" are reworked from unreleased demos. "I'm on Fire" was written as poem by Moore for his soon-to-be wife in 1978. The original "Devil's Door" can be found on the Live Anthology 1974 − 1976 boxset. Roye Albrighton's guitar playing is included as the introduction to the 2020 version. "Drifting" was recorded in one take with vocal lines and keyboards added later. It features several time signature changes, moving from 9/8 and 5/4 to 4/4.

== Track listing ==
All tracks are written by Nektar, exceptions as noted.

No.	Title	Writer(s)	Length
1.	"I'm on Fire"	Derek "Mo" Moore	8:32
2.	"Skywriter"		7:52
3.	"Love Is/The Other Side"		17:57
4.	"Drifting"		9:11
5.	"Devil's Door"	Roye Albrighton	8:11
6.	"The Light Beyond"		2:51
7.	"Look Thru Me"		5:02
8.	"Y Can't I B More Like U (2020)"		6:32

== Personnel ==
- Ryche Chlanda – lead guitar, lead vocals
- Kendall Scott – keyboards, piano, organ, Mellotron, backing vocals
- Ron Howden – drums, backing vocals
- Derek "Mo" Moore – bass guitar, backing vocals
- Randy Dembo – 12-string guitar, bass guitar
- Mick Brockett – special effects

Additional personnel

- Roye Albrighton – intro; guitar on "Devil's Door"

== Charts ==
Chart (2020)	Peak position
UK Progressive Albums (OCC)	26
