= ...Sounds Like This =

Studio album by Nektar
- Released: June 1973
- Recorded: 8, 9, 10 February 1973 (Original Album); 12 October 1972 and 19 February 1973 (Bonus Tracks)
- Studio: Dierks Studios, Pulheim-Stommeln, Germany
- Genre: Progressive rock
- Length: 74:17; 76:26 (Bonus Tracks)
- Label: Bacillus
- Producer: Nektar and Peter Hauke

Nektar chronology
A Tab in the Ocean (1972)	...Sounds Like This (1973)	Remember the Future (1973)

...Sounds Like This is the third album from English progressive rock band Nektar, released in 1973. It was the first Nektar album to be released in their home country of the United Kingdom. An attempt to recreate the band's live sound, ...Sounds Like This was largely improvised and dominated by extensive instrumental jamming, in contrast to their usual concept and composition-driven albums. The different approach to recording, combined with a number of difficulties with the mixing, resulted in it being the band's heaviest work.

== Background and recording ==
The idea behind ...Sounds Like This, conceived by the band themselves, was to create an album that recreated Nektar's live sound while avoiding the various recording and sound quality difficulties inherent to live recordings. To this end, on 12 October 1972 the band set up their gear in Dierks Studios and performed for a little over an hour to an audience of just a small group of friends. The majority of the tracks had already been written before Nektar had formed, and were commonly played during their live shows before the album's recording. Some had also been recorded in 1970 as the, "Boston Tapes," but those recordings were never released until their inclusion on the 40th Anniversary Edition of Remember the Future .

Dissatisfied with the original master, Nektar and producer Peter Hauke opted to do a series of dubs and re-recordings, which took place in February. Of the tracks recorded during the original October session, only "Wings" appeared on the album in its original form, without dubbing or additional takes. Two songs from the original session ("Sunshine Down on the City" and "It's All in Ya Mind") were cut from the album entirely, and new songs that had been written in the intervening four months were added. The original sleeve notes state the album to have been recorded entirely in February 1973, omitting the October 1972 session. Several of the recordings from the October 1972 session later appeared as bonus tracks.

== Reception ==
Professional ratings
Review scores
Source	Rating
Allmusic	4/5 stars

Allmusic's brief retrospective review dismissed ...Sounds Like This as "a step backward, with lighter, less ambitious songs that didn't work as well as their long form sound."

== Track listing ==
All tracks are written by Nektar except where noted.

Side one
No.	Title	Length
1.	"Good Day"	6:45
2.	"New Day Dawning"	5:02
3.	"What Ya Gonna Do?"	5:24

Side two
No.	Title	Length
4.	"1-2-3-4"	12:47
5.	"Do You Believe in Magic?"	7:17

Side three
No.	Title	Length
6.	"Cast Your Fate"	5:44
7.	"A Day in the Life of a Preacher" a. "Preacher" b. "Squeeze" c. "Mr. H"	13:01

Side four
No.	Title	Length
8.	"Wings"	3:46
9.	"Odyssee" a. "Ron's On" b. "Never, Never, Never" c. "Da-Da-Dum"	14:31

== 2006 reissue ==
Disc two bonus tracks
No.	Title	Length
1.	"Good Day"	7:10
2.	"New Day Dawning"	5:36
3.	"Sunshine Down In The City"	13:02
4.	"Da Da Dum"	6:30
5.	"What Ya Gonna Do?"	6:50
6.	"It's All In Your Mind"	12:48
7.	"Cast Your Fate Jam"	20:25
8.	"Wings"	3:54

== 2013 reissue ==
Double CD reissue on Purple Pyramid Records. Disc one is the original double LP. Disc two includes bonus tracks: two radio edits, plus more songs from the same "Official Bootleg" 1971 live show used for bonus tracks on the 2013 reissues of Journey to the Centre of the Eye and A Tab in the Ocean. The 2013 reissue includes none of the bonus tracks from the 2006 reissue.

Radio edits
No.	Title	Length
1.	"1-2-3-4" (radio version)	2:56
2.	"Do You Believe in Magic?" (radio version)	3:48

Official Bootleg. Recorded live November 13, 1971 at Bessunger Turnhalle, Darmstadt, Germany
No.	Title	Length
3.	"Good Day"	7:59
4.	"Odyssee (Da Da Dum)"	6:38
5.	"1-2-3-4"	13:20
6.	"Do You Believe in Magic?"	4:53
7.	"Odyssee (Ron's On)"	10:36
8.	"New Day Dawning"	7:28

== Personnel ==
- Roye Albrighton – lead vocals, guitars
- Allan "Taff" Freeman – keyboards, vocals
- Derek "Mo" Moore – bass, vocals
- Ron Howden – drums, percussion
- Mick Brockett – lights

=== Production ===
- Peter Hauke – producer
- Dieter Dierks – engineer
