= Martin Schippert =

Swiss Hells' Angel

Martin "Tino" Schippert (1 May 1946 – 1981) was a Swiss "Halbstarker" (member of a youth subculture similar to Beatniks or Yobbo), Rocker, a so-called "68er" and is considered to be founder of the Hells Angels in Switzerland. Schippert grew up in an upper-class environment, at the Zürichberg. He suffered from various illnesses. Because of his health, he had to live in the Kindererholungsheim Celerina, to recover. After finishing school, Schippert chose an apprenticeship as a Rhine sailor.

In 1965, Schippert survived a grave motorcycle accident, but he passed what is referred to as the "Biker test": He wanted to ride a motorbike again, after all the pain he suffered. Schippert founded the Rächer Basel, a Halbstarken group which did not persist for a long time. He then joined the Zürich Rächer (Revengers) and became their leader in 1966. The group was renamed to Lone-Stars. From 19 November 1966 on, he was imprisoned for four months on remand. Then he had to appear in court and was condemned to 18 months of prison. Perhaps suffering a "meaning-of-life-crisis", he relinquished his Lone-Star-leadership. But during a long car journey (one destination is, amongst others, the International Song Days in Essen, Germany), he got inspired again, thanks to someone reading out Freewheelin Frank, a type of autobiography and speech of a Hells Angels secretary.

The Lone-Stars wanted to become real Hells Angels. The group began calling itself with the double name Hells Angels-Lone-Stars — without permission. But when that came to the attention of Cisco Valderrama, a leader of the Oakland's Hells Angels, he advised the Swiss that they have to get a permission and pass prospectship. Christmas 1970, Schippert received the formal acknowledgment that his club was worthy to call itself Hells Angels. In 1981, Schippert died in Tutilimundi, Bolivia, as "Carlos Martin Schippert". The exact circumstances are not clear. He was a source of inspiration for writer Friedrich Dürrenmatt, who was acquainted with him – Sergius Golowin brought them together.

In 2014, Adrian Winkler released a documentary film about his life Tino - Frozen Angel, based on the novel by Willi Wottreng called Tino – König des Untergrunds.
