= Rufus Zuphall =

German progressive rock band

- Origin: Aachen, Germany
- Genres: Krautrock, progressive rock, psychedelic rock
- Years active: 1969 – 1973; 1999 -
- Labels: Pilz, Longhair

Rufus Zuphall is a German progressive rock band from Aachen, part of the Krautrock scene of the 1970s.

== History ==
The band was founded in 1969 by Günter Krause (guitar, vocals), Helmut Lieblang (bass guitar), Klaus Gülden (flute) and Udo Dahmen (drums). The band's style used to blend prog rock, blues rock, hard rock and some folk-ish, often instrumental tunes. A special feature of the group is the use of the flute, which sometimes led to comparisons with the English band Jethro Tull.

In 1970, the band self-released its first LP, Weiß der Teufel... with limited copies available, including an experimental title track which was over 17 minutes long. On the second album, Phallbost (1971) the band worked with Dieter Dierks and his recording studios although, before a planned third LP was completed, the musicians decided to separate in 1973 for musical and personal reasons. The half-finished LP appeared only 20 years later on CD as Avalon and On (1993), also with live recordings 1970 and 1971.

In 1999, the former members decided to reunite and, in 2000, they released a live CD entitled Colder Than Hell. In December 2007, Outside the Gates of Eden was released on the LongHair label, consisting of more live recordings.

== Personnel ==
- Klaus Gülden - flute, percussion
- Günter Krause - guitars, keyboards, vocals
- Helmut Lieblang - bass guitar
- Udo Dahmen - drums, tablas, percussion
- Thomas Kittel - guitar, clavinet
- Manfred Spangenberg - bass guitar
- Erich Engels - percussion

== Discography ==
- Weiß der Teufel... (1970)
- Phallobst (1971)
- Avalon and On (archival recordings, 1993)
- Colder Than Hell (live, 2000)
- Outside the Gates of Eden (live, 2007)
