= Journey to the Centre of the Eye =

Studio album by Nektar
- Released: November 1971
- Recorded: June – August 1971
- Studio: Dierks Studios in Köln-Stommeln, West Germany
- Genre: Progressive rock; psychedelia; space rock
- Length: 42:02
- Label: Bacillus
- Producer: Dieter Dierks, Peter Hauke, Nektar

Nektar chronology
| Journey to the Centre of the Eye (1971) | A Tab in the Ocean (1972) |

Journey to the Centre of the Eye is the debut album from English progressive rock band Nektar which came out in November 1971. Though formally divided into 13 tracks, the entire album consists of a single continuous piece of music, with some musical themes that are repeated throughout the work. Because of its narrative nature, it has been called a rock opera and/or dense concept album. The story follows an astronaut who, while on a voyage to Saturn, encounters aliens who take him to their galaxy, where he is suffused with knowledge and wisdom. It is usually interpreted as a commentary on the nuclear arms race.

== Reception ==
Professional ratings
Review scores
| Source | Rating |
|---|---|
| Allmusic | 4/5 stars |

Allmusic's retrospective review stated that "throughout Journey's 13 cuts, Nektar introduced their own sort of instrumental surrealism that radiated from both the vocals and from the intermingling of the haphazard drum and string work." They gave unqualified praise to both the compositions and the performances of each of the individual members.

== Track listing ==
All songs written and arranged by Nektar.

Side one
| No. | Title | Length |
|---|---|---|
| 1. | "Prelude" | 1:25 |
| 2. | "Astronaut's Nightmare" | 6:27 |
| 3. | "Countenance" | 3:33 |
| 4. | "The Nine Lifeless Daughters of the Sun" | 2:55 |
| 5. | "Warp Oversight" | 4:10 |
| 6. | "The Dream Nebula I" | 2:14 |

Side two
| No. | Title | Length |
|---|---|---|
| 7. | "The Dream Nebula II" | 2:26 |
| 8. | "It's All in the Mind" | 3:22 |
| 9. | "Burn Out My Eyes" | 7:50 |
| 10. | "Void of Vision" | 2:02 |
| 11. | "Pupil of the Eye" | 2:47 |
| 12. | "Look Inside Yourself" | 0:54 |
| 13. | "Death of the Mind" | 1:57 |

== 2013 reissue ==
A double CD reissue of Journey to the Centre of the Eye was released in 2013 on Purple Pyramid Records. The first CD is the original album. The second CD two includes part of a live 1971 show from Germany, where the band played the entire title song. (During later tours, exemplified by the 1973 show that appears on the 2021 live album Sounds Like Swiss, Nektar played a heavily abbreviated rendition of the song which ends with the "Dream Nebula" movement.) Additional songs from this "Official Bootleg" show are included on the 2013 reissues of A Tab in the Ocean and ...Sounds Like This.

Bonus CD: Official Bootleg, recorded live November 13, 1971 at Bessunger Turnhalle, Darmstadt, Germany
| No. | Title | Length |
|---|---|---|
| 1. | "Prelude" | 2:03 |
| 2. | "Astronaut's Nightmare" | 6:51 |
| 3. | "Countenance" | 3:36 |
| 4. | "The Nine Lifeless Daughters of the Sun" | 3:31 |
| 5. | "Warp Oversight" | 4:26 |
| 6. | "The Dream Nebula I" | 2:24 |
| 7. | "The Dream Nebula II" | 2:35 |
| 8. | "It's All in the Mind" | 3:39 |
| 9. | "Burn out My Eyes" | 7:24 |
| 10. | "Void of Vision" | 1:56 |
| 11. | "Pupil of the Eye" | 2:08 |
| 12. | "Look Inside Yourself" | 0:46 |
| 13. | "Death of the Mind" | 5:05 |

== Personnel ==
- Roye Albrighton - guitars, vocals
- Mick Brockett - liquid lights
- Allan "Taff" Freeman - Mellotron, pianos, organ, vocals
- Ron Howden - drums, percussion
- Derek "Mo" Moore - Mellotron, bass, vocals
- Keith Walters - static slides

Additional personnel

- Dieter Dierks - additional piano

Production

- Produced by Nektar, Dieter Dierks & Peter Hauke
- Engineered by Dieter Dierks
