= Evolution (Nektar album) =

Studio album by Nektar
- Released: 4 October 2004
- Genre: Progressive rock
- Length: 61:15
- Label: Dream Nebula

Nektar chronology
The Prodigal Son (2001)	Evolution (2004)	Book of Days (2008)

Professional ratings
Review scores
Source	Rating
Allmusic	4/5 stars

Evolution is the tenth album by progressive rock band Nektar, released in 2004. It was the first Nektar album since 1977's Magic Is a Child to feature original drummer Ron Howden, who rejoined other founding members Roye Albrighton and Taff Freeman.

The song "Phazed by the Storm" was included on the compilation album After the Storm which benefited the survivors of Hurricane Katrina and was released by NEARFest Records.

== Track listing ==
All tracks are written by Roye Albrighton, except as noted

No.	Title	Writer(s)	Length
1.	"Camouflage to White"		7:04
2.	"Old Mother Earth"	Albrighton, Allan "Taff" Freeman	7:41
3.	"Child of Mine"		6:43
4.	"Phazed by the Storm"		9:22
5.	"Always"		7:02
6.	"Dancin' Into the Void"		8:19
7.	"The Debate"		9:31
8.	"After the Fall"		5:36

== Personnel ==
- Roye Albrighton – Guitars, Lead Vocals
- Allan "Taff " Freeman – Keyboards, Piano, Organ, Mellotron, Backing Vocals
- Ron Howden – Drums, Backing Vocals
- Randy Dembo – Bass Guitar, Bass Pedals, Backing Vocals
