= Elisabeth White =

Australian filmmaker

- Genres: Rock; Pop
- Occupations: Film Director, Film Producer, Singer/Songwriter, Actress,
- Instruments: Vocals, guitar, piano
- Years active: 1988-present
- Labels: Wagram, BMG

Elisabeth White is an Australian film director, film producer, singer/songwriter and abstract painter.

== Biography ==
=== Musical career ===
Elisabeth White was born in Sydney, Australia, to an American/Austrian father and a Greek mother. She started performing on stage at the age of five, was performing the lead roles in several local musicals by the time she was 10, and started composing her first songs when she was 13. After studying drama at the Australian Acting and Theater School in Sydney, she moved with her father to New York City upon her parents' divorce, where she played in several bands and was cast as the role of Mary Magdalene in an Off-Broadway run of Jesus Christ Superstar.

At 17, she moved to Europe, where she at first made a living as a session musician, but soon shifted her attention to composing and performing her own music. Managed by the Steinblatt Music Group, she released her debut album Maybe God's a Woman Too on BMG's Wagram imprint. The album was produced by Dennis Ward, recorded at Dieter Dierks' studio in Cologne, and was warmly received, spawning hits like Cool Summer. During the tour for the album, she supported artists such as Simple Minds, Lenny Kravitz, Beastie Boys and Pulp.

Her second album was released three years later and was entitled Come To Me. It too was well received by critics and contained the hits Thank You My Child, which was released as a single by Ronald McDonald House Charities, and Wherever You Go.

=== Discography ===
- Maybe God's a Woman Too (Wagram/BMG)
- Come To Me (Wagram/BMG)
- Let your body cry (Wagram/BMG)
- Babylon Live unplugged tour Bluemartin records (Wagram/BMG)
- Thank you my child (Ronald Mc Donald Children's Foundation)
