= A Tab in the Ocean =

Studio album by Nektar
- Released: November 1972
- Recorded: 2–13 October 1972; August 1976 (remixed 1976 US version)
- Studios: Dierks Studios at Pulheim-Stommeln, Germany; The House of Music, West Orange, N.J. (remixed 1976 US version) & Sterling Sound, New York, N.Y (mastered 1976 US version)
- Genre: Progressive rock
- Length: 35:39; 69:53 (2004 reissue)
- Labels: Bacillus; Passport Records (remixed 1976 US version)
- Producer: Peter Hauke

Nektar chronology
Journey to the Centre of the Eye (1971)	A Tab in the Ocean (1972)	...Sounds Like This (1973)

Professional ratings
Review scores
Source	Rating
Allmusic	3.5/5 stars

A Tab in the Ocean is the second album from German-based English progressive rock band Nektar.

English heavy metal band Iron Maiden covered the song "King of Twilight", also mixing in parts of "Crying in the Dark" creating somewhat of a medley, and released as a b-side to the 1984 single "Aces High".

== Track listing ==
All songs written and arranged by Nektar.

Side one
No.	Title	Length
1.	"A Tab in the Ocean"	16:43

Side two
No.	Title	Length
2.	"Desolation Valley"	5:42
3.	"Waves"	2:30
4.	"Crying in the Dark"	6:17
5.	"King of Twilight"	4:27

== 2004 reissue ==
The original German mix 1972
No.	Title	Length
1.	"A Tab in the Ocean"	16:53
2.	"Desolation Valley / Waves"	8:13
3.	"Crying in the Dark"	6:29
4.	"King of Twilight"	4:22

1976 US Mix
No.	Title	Length
5.	"A Tab in the Ocean"	16:04
6.	"Desolation Valley / Waves"	8:33
7.	"Crying in the Dark"	5:14
8.	"King of Twilight"	4:05

== 2013 reissue ==
Double CD reissue. Disc one as 2004 reissue above, with both 1972 and 1976 album mixes. The bonus disc two includes more songs from the same "Official Bootleg" 1971 show released on the bonus disc of the 2013 reissue of Journey to the Centre of the Eye, plus a live in the studio track from 1973.

Official Bootleg, Recorded live November 13, 1971 at Bessunger Turnhalle, Darmstadt, Germany
No.	Title	Length
1.	"A Tab in the Ocean"	17:46
2.	"Porecelain Valley (later called "Desolation Valley")"	11:33
3.	"Crying in the Dark"	9:17

Live in the studio 1973
No.	Title	Length
4.	"Desolation Valley / Waves"	8:25

== Personnel ==
Nektar

- Roye Albrighton – guitars, lead vocals
- Mick Brockett – lighting, projections and visual effects
- Allan Freeman – keyboards, backing vocals, Mellotron
- Derek "Mo" Moore – bass, backing vocals
- Ron Howden – drums, percussion

Production

- Peter Hauke – production
- Dieter Dierks – engineering

== Charts ==
Chart (1976)	Peak position
US Billboard 200	141
