= Michael Dierks =

German actor from Cologne

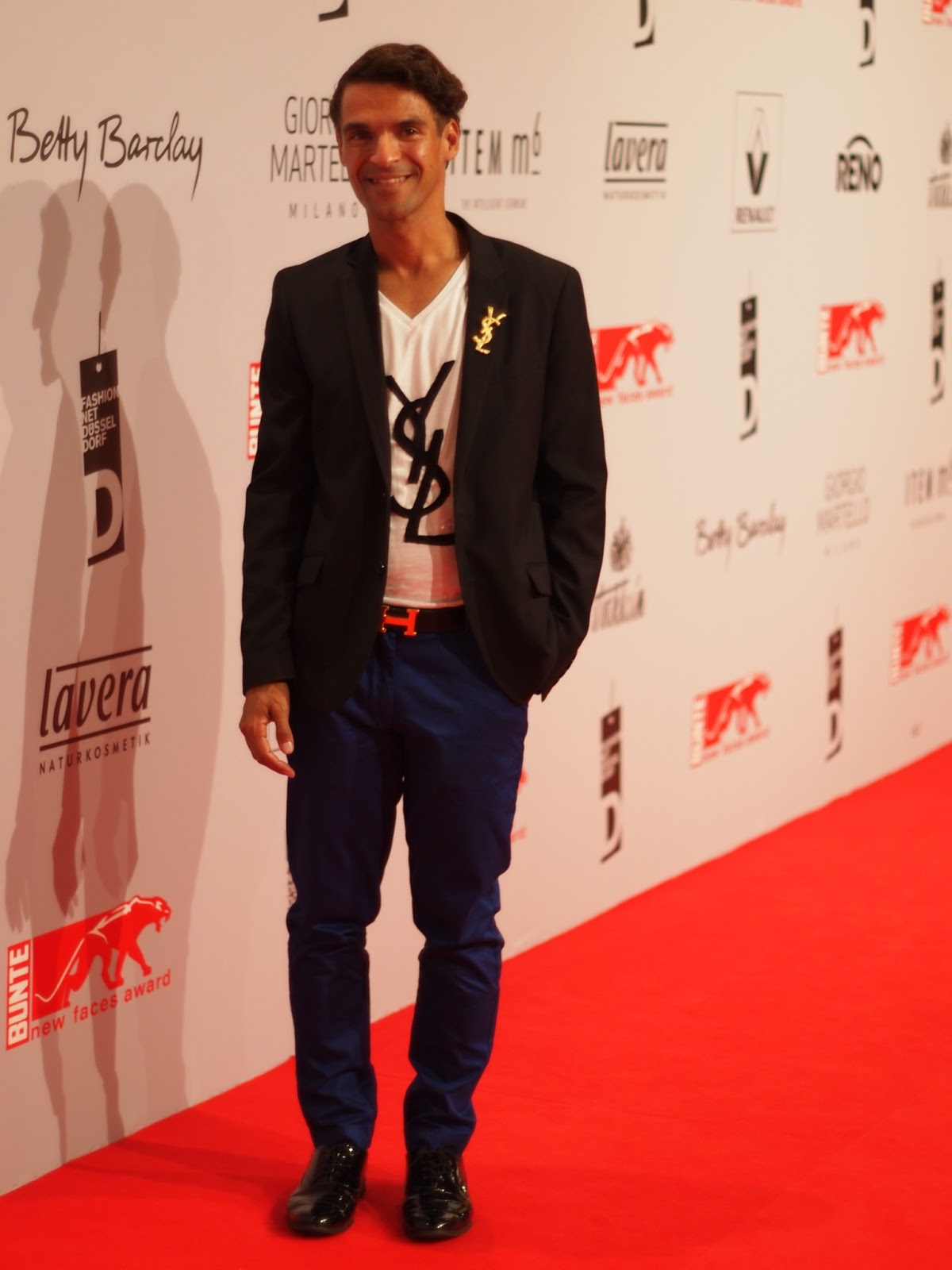
Michael Dierks on the red carpet at the BUNTE New Faces Award

Michael Dierks (born 21 July 1970) is a German actor from Cologne.

== Biography ==
His father is the record producer Dieter Dierks, who produced stars such as the Scorpions and Twisted Sister. Michael grew up at the Dierks Studios. There he entertained stars of the music and movie industry already as a child, usually when they were taking breaks from recording at the Studios. His choice to become an actor came naturally. He went to school in Stommeln and Cologne, Germany, but when he turned 18 he decided to move to America. He studied acting, directing, and entertainment business at the University of California, Los Angeles and graduated magna cum laude. His first film role came through the Warner Bros. production Mambo Kings with Antonio Banderas. However, he missed his homeland and returned to Germany to continue his career there.

== Acting career ==
He became a German cult figure through the hit TV show TV Kaiser, which ran for five years and re-runs are still shown on German RTL TV channel every day. In the show he played the character of "Marco Mommson" the clumsy assistant to a talk show host and dressed up as various stars in music and television, including women. He imitated Karl Lagerfeld, Tina Turner and many others. In 1997 he then was nominated by the German magazine Hörzu for the "Golden Camera" as "Best Comedic Actor of the Year". Appearances on the German Saturday Night Live followed and he hosted the big 24-hour BBC and RTL 2 TV marathon for New Year's Eve 2000, which started at noon and finished at noon the next day and had live cameras showing countries from the New Zealand to US at the same time. In the year 2004 he made his German movie debut with Austrian star Christoph Waltz and German star Iris Berben in Beautiful Widows are Better Kissers, directed by Carlo Rola. Last international production in London together with Hollywood Star Jeffrey Dean Morgen in / The Postcar Killings by director Danis Tanovic

== Music productions ==
Dierks owns his own record label called Reform House, featuring mostly house music. He started his music career while being in America. He got together with the power team of Bionic Beat Records and soon their collaborations were playing in Germany's biggest house clubs and were featured in TV shows. He has also released several of his own records, including self-produced remixes of Rah Band (Richard Hewson), which found a following in Europe and Japan. He often is a guest on radio shows, playing his music and comedy.

== Other information ==
Michael Dierks lives in London, England for almost 10 years and became a British Citizen in 2021. He comes from a long line of entertainers and entertainment industry professionals. His father is the record producer Dieter Dierks, his youngest sister is writer/director Dominique Schilling, his grandfather was the composer Hans Dierks. Michael Dierks is not married and does not have children, but he does a lot of charity work, mostly for children's cancer research and the SOS Children's Villages.

== Filmography ==
- 2021: Unter Uns, RTL
- 2020: The Postcard Killings
- 2017: Dedication based upon Stephen King
- 2013: Der letzte Bulle
- 2011: Als das Wasser bergauf lief (Kino)
- 2005: Bewegte Männer
- 2004: Reiche Witwen küssen besser
- 2004: VIVA Star Chat Moderation
- 2002-08: Hausmeister Krause
- 2002: Alles Pocher oder was?
- 2002: Marienhof
- 2002: Die Couchmanns
- 2001: Marienhof
- 2001: Anwalt Abel
- 2000: v.s (Kurzfilm)
- 2000: Live Countdown Neujahr
- 1995-99: TV Kaiser
- 1999: Deutschland blüht
- 1999: VIVA Stand-up TV
- 1998: RTL Samstag Spät Nacht
- 1997: Gute Zeiten, schlechte Zeiten
- 1994-95: Cult Moderation TV
- 1991: Mambo Kings
- 1990: Mothers Finest MV
