= Fahrenheit 212 =

German metal band

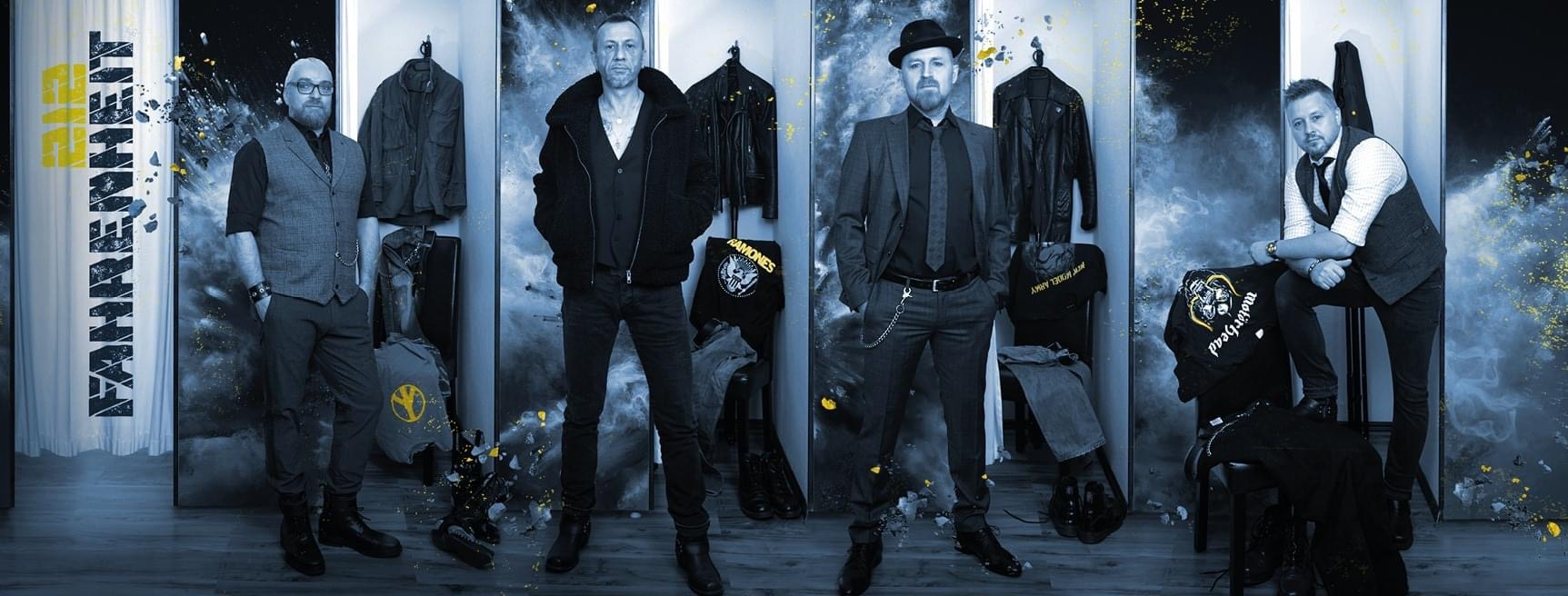
Oliver Kranz, Patrick Lyhs, Carsten Frederik Hiller, Kay Gerling-Bassmann (November 2020)

Fahrenheit 212 is a German metal band founded in 1992 by Mirko Kerber, Patrick Lyhs and Carsten F. Hiller. After about two years, Kay Gerling Bassmann and Jean-Ray Kokoschko joined them. On March 13, 1995, their debut album Der Hexer appeared on Bacillus Records, a sub-label of Bellaphon. The follow-up Crusade of Feelings appeared on September 30, 1996 .

In 2007, after a ten-year break, they released their third album, Neues vom Hexer. A double album, the second CD containing instrumental versions and two remixes. Mirko Kerber left the band in spring 2008 for personal reasons and Oliver Kranz took over as lead singer. In 2009, the band took part in the Brandenburg State Sound Choice project and the "Kreuzberger Musikalische Aktion eV" (KMA) initiative. In the 2009 German election year, the accompanying sampler set an example against disaffection with politics and right-wing extremism.

The concept album Vaka Teatea was released March 18, 2016. The idea for the album came during a collaboration with the folklore musicians HeReHaRa from Rapa Nui (Easter Island). The album was released as a digipak with an attached booklet via recordJet distributed by Soulfood and also contains a title that is sung in the language of Easter Island. The mastering was done by Harris Johnswhile guitarist Patrick Lyhs took over production. The album title is an expression in Rapanui and means "white ship".

In the same year, Fahrenheit 212 recorded at the 34th German Rock & Pop Prize in the Siegerlandhalle in Siegen. They achieved 2nd place in the "Best Hard Rock Band 2016 Live" category, 1st place in the "Best Booklet and Inlaycard 2016" category and 2nd place for "Best Hard Rock Album 2016" . Their five-minute short appearance, in which they played the title song by Vaka Teatea, took place together with the samba kids from Berlin.

A documentary about the musicians' trip to Easter Island is currently in pre-production. Production for this will take over Martin Lischke and the director of this documentary project, the working title of 100 ° on Rapa Nui bears, Christian Klandt.

== Discography ==
=== Albums ===
- 1995: Der Hexer (Bellaphon)
- 1996: Kreuzzug der Gefühle (Bellaphon)
- 2007: Neues vom Hexer (2CD, Bellaphon)
- 2016: Vaka TeaTea (Soundfire Records / Soulfood)

=== Singles ===
- 2009: Ka Hoki Mai (Single, SMM / Soundfire Records)

=== Samplers and soundtracks ===
- 2009: Was zählt on Soundwahl (Kreuzberger Musikalische Aktion e.V.)
- 2010: Du weist den Weg and Zeit der Wölfe onLieder der Straße (Blueline Production)
- 2019: RTL-Serie "Wir sind jetzt" (Staffel 1 und 2)
- 2020: "LEIF in Concert Vol. II" (Spielfilm)
