= Remember the Future (Nektar album) =

Studio album by Nektar
- Released: November 1973
- Recorded: August 1973
- Studios: Chipping Norton Studio, Chipping Norton, Oxfordshire, England
- Genres: Progressive rock; funk
- Length: 35:33
- Label: Bacillus
- Producers: Peter Hauke and Nektar

Nektar chronology
| ...Sounds Like This (1973) | Remember the Future (1973) | Sunday Night at London Roundhouse (1974) |

Professional ratings
Review scores
| Source | Rating |
|---|---|
| Allmusic | link |

Remember the Future is the fourth album from English progressive rock band Nektar. Much like their debut album Journey to the Centre of the Eye, it is a concept album which is formally divided into ten tracks but in fact consists of one continuous piece of music. It is the band's highest-charting album, peaking at #19 on the Billboard album chart.

== Release ==
Remember the Future was first released in 1973 by Bacillus (Bellaphon).

The album was re-released in 1990 on LP and CD by Germany's Bellaphon. The mix used for this release was the quadrophonic LP mix that was rejected. In 2002 Bellaphon remastered the album from the original tapes and reissued it on CD with two bonus tracks, which were Radio Promo edits. This was the first time that the correct LP mixes were released on CD.

In 2004 Remember the Future was once again re-released, but this time by the UK's Eclectic Discs/Dream Nebula Recordings. For this reissue the remastered version was used and they added a third Radio edit of the title track. This version was also released as a SACD, which includes a 5.1 surround mix (which was actually the original 1973 quadraphonic mix with derived center and LFE channels added); the 2 channel audio CD layer contains the 2002 remix. Track 3 ("Remember the Future") is an edit released on a various artists compilation album titled Made In Germany. Tracks 4 and 5 are radio promo only single edits.

In 2013, Cleopatra Records subsidiary Purple Pyramid Records issued a 40th anniversary 2-CD set of the original album, plus a bonus disc including the three radio edits from the 2004 release, plus eight songs from the 1970 Boston Tapes, recorded Jun 22, 1970 in Boston by Charlie Dreyer.

In 2014, Purple Pyramid Records issued a limited edition 3-CD set, adding a third disc to the 40th anniversary release, consisting of previously released material: newly-written songs the band recorded during a jam session on March 27, 1974 at Chipping Norton Studios in Oxfordshire, England. Three of the six songs had originally been released as side two of Sunday Night at London Roundhouse in 1974. The remaining three tracks were added to the 2002 release Unidentified Flying Abstract - Live at Chipping Norton 1974 on Bacillus/Bellaphon Records in Germany.

== Track listing ==
All songs written by Nektar (Roye Albrighton, Allan Freeman, Ron Howden, Derek Moore), except where indicated.

Side one
| No. | Title | Length |
|---|---|---|
| 1. | "Remember the Future (Part 1)" a. "Images of the Past" b. "Wheel of Time" c. "Remember the Future" d. "Confusion" | 16:38 |

Side two
| No. | Title | Length |
|---|---|---|
| 2. | "Remember the Future (Part 2)" a. "Returning Light" b. "Questions and Answers" c. "Tomorrow Never Comes" d. "Path of Light" e. "Recognition" f. "Let It Grow" | 18:55 |

== 2004 CD reissue ==
Bonus tracks
| No. | Title | Length |
|---|---|---|
| 3. | "Remember the Future" (Made in Germany edit) | 9:51 |
| 4. | "Lonely Roads" (Radio promo only single edit) | 3:50 |
| 5. | "Let It Grow" (Radio promo only single edit) | 2:19 |

== 2013 40th anniversary reissue ==
Radio edits
| No. | Title | Length |
|---|---|---|
| 1. | "Remember the Future" (Made in Germany edit) | 9:55 |
| 2. | "Let It Grow" (Radio edit) | 3:52 |
| 3. | "Lonely Roads" (Radio edit) | 2:18 |

1970 Boston Tapes
| No. | Title | Length |
|---|---|---|
| 4. | "New Day Dawning" | 5:36 |
| 5. | "Do You Believe in Magic?" | 3:40 |
| 6. | "Candlelight" | 4:00 |
| 7. | "Good Day" | 8:51 |
| 8. | "The Life I've Been Leading" | 4:35 |
| 9. | "Where Did You Go" | 5:27 |
| 10. | "Sealed with a Kiss" (Gary Geld, Peter Udell) | 3:56 |
| 11. | "Our Love Will Last Forever" | 4:54 |

== Personnel ==
=== Nektar ===
- Roye Albrighton – guitars, lead vocals
- Allan "Taff" Freeman – keyboards, backing vocals
- Derek "Mo" Moore – bass guitar, backing vocals
- Ron Howden – drums, percussion, backing vocals
- Mick Brockett – lights

=== Technical ===
- Peter Hauke – producer
- Barry Hammond – engineer

== Charts ==
| Chart (1973–75) | Peak position |
|---|---|
| Australian Albums (Kent Music Report) | 72 |
| Canada Top Albums/CDs (RPM) | 25 |
| New Zealand Albums (RMNZ) | 35 |
| US Billboard 200 | 19 |
