= Ganymed (band) =

Austrian/German band

- Origin: Vienna, Austria
- Genres: Space disco, disco, space rock, Adult contemporary (in their final album), art rock, Austropop, dance-punk, dance, Experimental rock, krautrock, new wave, neo-psychedelia, techno
- Years active: 1977–1983
- Labels: Bellaphon Records
- Past members: Gerry Edmond; Yvonne Dory; Rudolf Mille; Gerhard Messinger; Ernst Nekola; Daniele Prencipe

Ganymed was an Austrian/German space disco band founded in 1977.

== Career ==
In 1978, they released their biggest hit, “It Takes Me Higher”, which hit #5 on the Austrian charts for four weeks and also hit #23 on the German charts. That same year, they released their debut album Takes You Higher, which ranked at #16 for 12 weeks and also spawned another single, “Saturn”.

1979 saw the release of their second album, Future World. The album’s title track was released as a B-side to “Dancing in a Disco”. Afterwards, they released their final album, Dimension No. 3, plus a non-album single, “Money Is Addiction (Of This Crazy World)” in 1980. At their last concert in 1981, Falco played bass for the group. Ganymed officially broke up in 1983.

== Members ==
- Gerry Edmond (real name Edmund Gerhard Czerwenka; pseudonym in the group: "Kroonk") – lead vocals, guitar, keyboards, synth programming
- Yvonne Dory (real name Doris Ellen Czerwenka; pseudonym in the group: "Pulsaria") – vocals
- Rudolf Mille (pseudonym in the group: "Vendd") – keyboards
- Gerhard Messinger-Neuwirth (pseudonym in the group: "Schnitzel") – bass, keyboards
- Ernst Hefter (pseudonym in the group: "Cak") – drums, percussion, drum programming
- Daniele Prencipe (pseudonym in the group: "Suk"; only appeared on "Takes You Higher") – keyboards

== Discography ==
=== Albums ===
- Takes You Higher (1978)
- Future World (1979)
- Dimension No. 3 (1980)

=== Singles ===
- "It Takes Me Higher" (1978)
- "Saturn/Music Drives Me Crazy" (1978)
- "Dancing in a Disco" (1979)
- "Money Is Addiction (Of This Crazy World)" (1980)
- "Bring Your Love To Me" (1980)

== In popular culture ==
"It Takes Me Higher" was used as the theme song for the Italian version of the Japanese anime Gaiking.
