= Merger (band) =

English reggae band

Background information
- Origin: England
- Genres: Reggae
- Years active: 1977–1980
- Labels: Sun-star Muzik Co, Bellaphon, President, Makasound
- Past members: Barry Ford, Winston Bennett, Michael Dan, Tony Osei, Michael Osei, Ivor Steadman

Merger were an English reggae band of Jamaican/Ghanaian descent that formed in 1977 and lasted until 1980. Their name "Merger" comes from the fact that they blended reggae music with their other musical influences. Their debut album, Exiles Ina Babylon was released in the UK in 1977 at a time when many British reggae bands, such as Aswad and Steel Pulse, were popular. Politically, the band's songs addressed issues of racial injustice in Britain, or racism in the United Kingdom and other countries, but they rejected the Marcus Garvey idea that all black people should return to Africa.

== Reception ==
- "The Jamaican/Ghanaian line up provided for a wide spectrum of reggae sounds. Merger's debut Exile In Babylon created a stir when released in 1977, ( but ) critics deemed it too soft core, and felt it catered too much to the pop market...This is not to say their first album was not political, it most surely was, and speaks of the injustices perpetrated on Blacks in England, and other countries." (Andrew Hamilton, Allmusic)
- "They integrated blues, soul, rock, funk and experimental influences in their musical efforts" (Teacher & Mr. T, Reggae Vibes)
- "Merger's reggae performance of "Soweto"... is a serious piece of political pop, whose protesting lyrics and skilful musicianship are more impressive than many of the fashion-rock bands" (Dr Ian Inglis, Popular Music And Television In Britain)
- "Led by the ever-so-soulful vocals of Barry Ford and the unusual deep voice of Michael Dan, with heavyweight compositions like "77" and "Understanding"" (Record Collector)
- "Merger created an experimental variation on the contemporary roots reggae formula and made many friends amongst those on the London gig circuit appearing on the same bill as punk and new wave acts… Indeed, the track ‘Rebel’ is a homage to Johnny Rotten... Exiles In A Babylon is an entertaining and very musical album that addresses the usual reggae concerns but in a more outernational style…" (Dub Vendor)
- "A wave of emotion amidst an ocean of musical desolation...At a time when the Iron Lady, Margaret Thatcher, was dismantling British socialism, "Exiles in Babylon" celebrates the fusion ("merger") of influences: reggae, punk, blues, jazz… More than the lyrics and themes, which are classic (praise to Jah and nature, faith in youth, denunciation of the system), it's the compositions themselves that truly stand out, most of them quite lengthy. The meticulously crafted arrangements are striking from the opening track, "Understanding ," with its acoustic guitar riffs and soaring flute melodies. This musical richness contributes to the album's modernity, as evidenced by its many successes: the eponymous " Exiles in Babylon ," the bucolic " Waterfalls ," the very serious "77" and "Ghetto Child "..." (Reggae France)

== Appearances ==
Merger appeared at the high-profile concert "The Picnic at Blackbushe" in 1978, alongside Bob Dylan, Eric Clapton, pub rock Rhythm and blues artist Graham Parker and the Rumour, and Joan Armatrading.

== Members ==
- Barry Ford (guitar, vocals)
- Winston Bennett (guitar, vocals)
- Michael Dan (keyboards)
- Tony Osei (keyboards)
- Michael Osei (drums)
- Ivor Steadman (bass)

== Discography ==
=== Albums ===
- Exiles In A Babylon (Sun-star Muzik Co, 1977)
- Armageddon Time (Bellaphon, 1980)
- Prisoner of Your Love (President, 1996)
- Exiles In A Babylon (re-issue, Makasound, 2009)

=== Singles ===
- "Seventy Seven" (CBS, 1979)
- "Biko" (Barclay, 1980)
- "Prisoner Of Your Love" / "You Are To Me" (Emergency, 1981)
- "Every Man Has A Woman Who Loves Him" (with Tchaï) (WEA, 1982)
