= Sergius Golowin =

Swiss publicist and myth researcher (1930–2006)

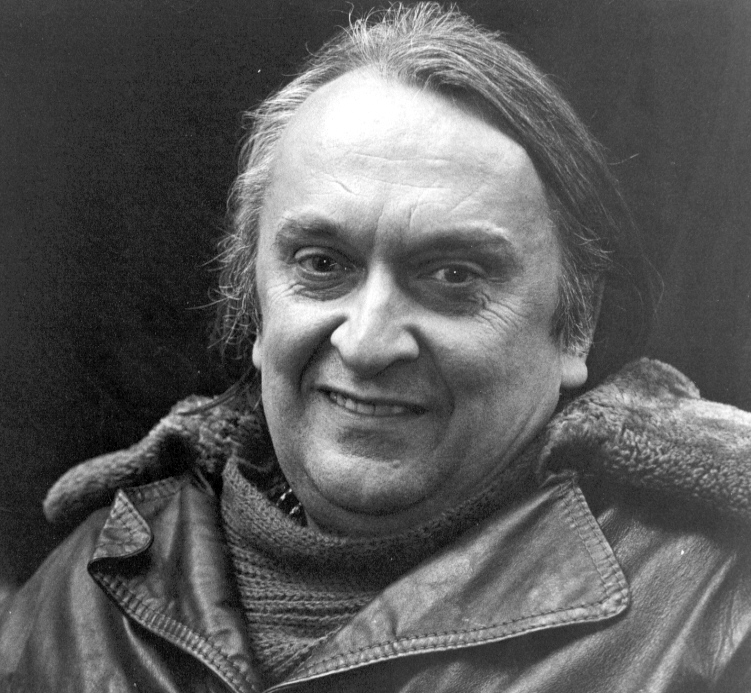
Sergius Golowin

Sergius Golowin (31 January 1930 in Prague, Czech Republic – 17 July 2006 in Bern, Switzerland) was a Bern writer, myths researcher, librarian, recording artist and publicist.

== Life ==
Sergius Golowin was born in 1930 in Prague, Czechoslovakia (now the Czech Republic). In 1933, he and his mother, poet Alla von Steiger, emigrated to Switzerland, while Golowin’s Russian father, a sculptor, lived in Paris without the family.

After finishing school, Golowin became a library assistant at the "Berner Stadt- und Universitätsbibliothek" (literally: "Bern City- and University-Library"). He took part in the "Jugendbewegung". During the 1950s he participated in "Tägel-Leist," one of Bern's subcultural discussion circles. From 1957 to 1968 Golowin worked as an archivist in Burgdorf. From 1971 to 1981 he served in a local government office in Switzerland as a member of the party Landesring der Unabhängigen ("LdU", which was established by Gottlieb Duttweiler and others). In his LdU office, Golowin was an advocate for youth culture and worked to solve numerous ecological problems. Afterward, he was a free writer living near Bern.

Sergius Golowin wrote numerous books and articles, primarily about folklore and esotericism. For his work in folklore and exploring the counterculture, he was awarded the prize of the Schweizerische Schillerstiftung in 1974.

Golowin was a contemporary of many notable people and events. He provided assistance to Timothy Leary while Leary was in Swiss exile. Golowin was a friend of Friedrich Dürrenmatt, and was portrayed by H. R. Giger. Golowin was present at the first performance of Polo Hofer's legendary Bern band "Rumpelstilz" and the band played on behalf of Golowin's election campaign. Golowin was an acquaintance of Martin "Tino" Schippert, founder of the Swiss Hells Angels.

In 1973, Golowin teamed up with Klaus Schulze, Bernd Witthüser, Walter Westrupp, Jörg Mierke, Jürgen Dollase and Jerry Berkers (the latter two of Wallenstein) to record the album "Lord Krishna von Goloka". This very experimental and highly sought-after album featured chantings by Golowin over improvised electronic instrumentation and acoustic guitar, and is considered by many to be a classic example of cosmic krautrock.
