= Nektar =

English progressive rock band

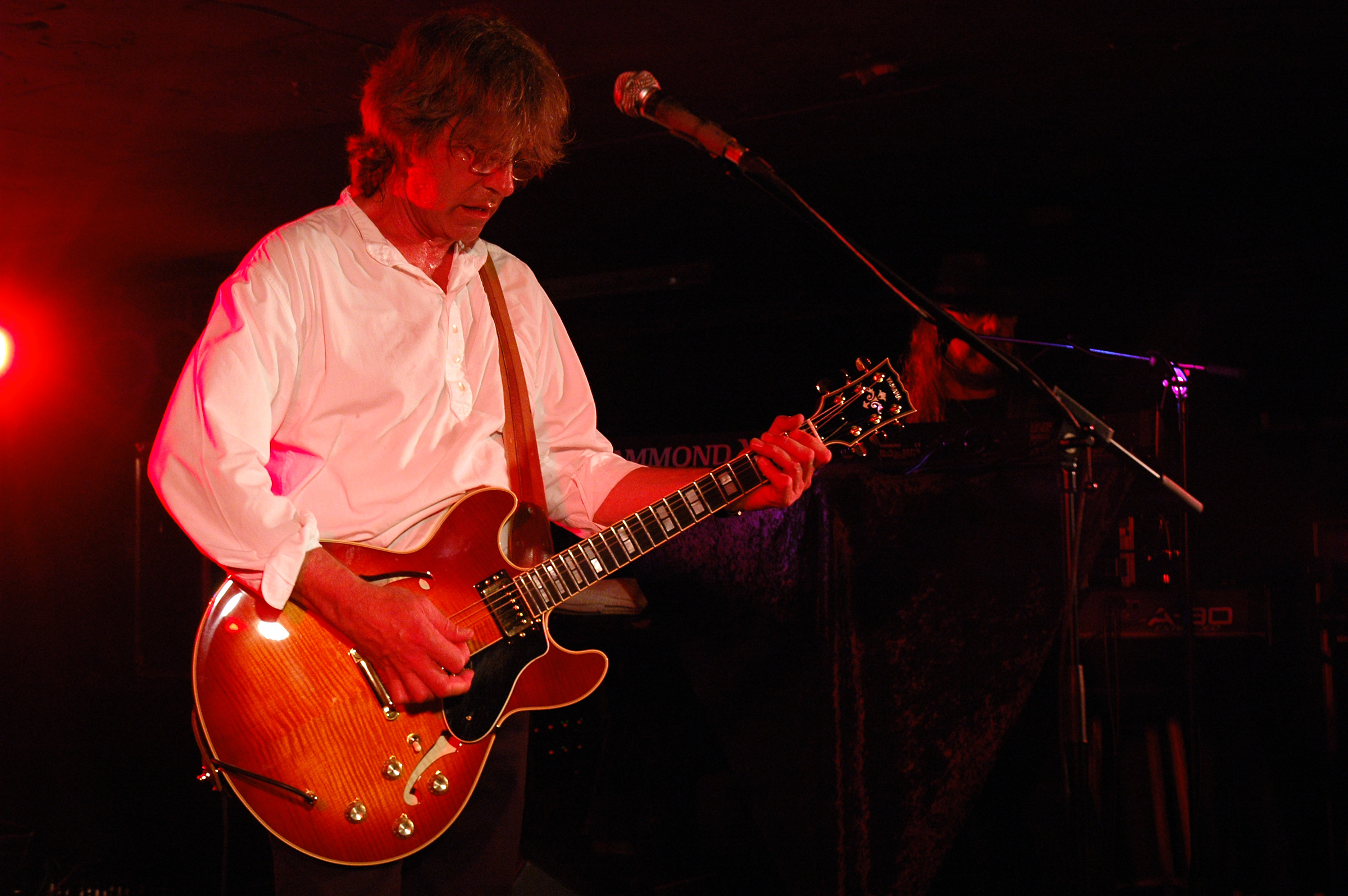
- Roye Albrighton with Nektar live in 2007

Background information
- Origin: Hamburg, West Germany
- Genres: Progressive rock; space rock; jam rock
- Years active: 1969–1978; 1979–1982; 2000–2016; 2019–present
- Labels: Current: On Stage; Purple Pyramid; Former: Bellaphon; United Artists; Passport; Decca; Polydor; Ariola; Bacillus
- Members: Nektar (US-based band); Derek "Mo" Moore; Ryche Chlanda; Kendall Scott; Mick Brockett; Randy Dembo; New Nektar (Germany-based band); Klaus Henatsch; Alexander Hoffmeister; Holger Trull; Norbert "Panza" Lehmann
- Past members: Roye Albrighton; Allan "Taff" Freeman; Ron Howden; Keith Walters; Dave Nelson; Dave Prater; Carmine Rojas; Ray Hardwick; Larry Fast; Tom Hughes; Steve Adams; Desha Dunnahoe; Steve Mattern; Peter Pichl; Billy Sherwood; Tom Fry; Lux Vibratus; Tommi Schmidt; Che Albrighton
- Website: nektarsmusic.com

Nektar (German for nectar) is an English progressive rock band formed in Hamburg, West Germany in 1969, by guitarist and lead vocalist Roye Albrighton, keyboardist Allan "Taff" Freeman, bassist Derek "Mo" Moore, and drummer Ron Howden.

== History ==
=== 1969–1973: Early years ===
The band formed in Hamburg, West Germany in 1969. The founding members were Englishmen Roye Albrighton on guitars and lead vocals, Allan "Taff" Freeman on keyboards, Derek "Mo" Moore on bass, Ron Howden on drums and artists Mick Brockett and Keith Walters on lights and "special effects". Though the concept of non-performing bandmembers was not unprecedented (e.g. lyricist Keith Reid in Procol Harum), it was unusual that a third of Nektar's lineup had no role in performing or writing their music. Throughout their early existence the band's songwriting was credited to all six members on the album sleeves, but BMI records show that the music was written by the four performing members. Brockett did however co-write the lyrics with Moore, and invented or contributed to the original album titles.

The band's debut album, Journey to the Centre of the Eye (1971), consisted of a single song running over 40 minutes, with the last 100 seconds of the first side repeated at the beginning of the second side to maintain continuity. It was a concept album, following an astronaut who is given overwhelming knowledge by extraterrestrials, with sonic textures reminiscent of psychedelic rock. The follow-up, A Tab in the Ocean (1972), drew on more conventional rock and blues influences. Walters had left by the time of their third album, the heavily improvised double album ...Sounds Like This (1973), though the band would continue to use his art in their shows and album designs for a time. A cult following grew for the band, based largely on word of mouth.

=== 1973–1982: Height of success and disbanding ===
Nektar's U.S. release, Remember the Future (1973), propelled the band briefly into mass popularity. A concept album revisiting Journey to the Centre of the Eye's theme of extraterrestrials granting a human enlightenment, but with a blind boy as the protagonist. It demonstrated a more melodic sound than previous albums and shot into the Top 20 album charts in the U.S. The follow-up, Down to Earth (1974), was another concept album (this time with a circus theme); it also sold well, breaking into the Top 40 album charts and including their only song to chart on the Billboard singles charts, "Astral Man". The next album, Recycled (1975), was stylistically close to bands like Gentle Giant and carried on the band's close connection with progressive rock.

Albrighton left the band in December 1976, just prior to the studio sessions for Nektar's first major-label release, Magic Is a Child (1977). The remaining members were joined by guitarist/vocalist Dave Nelson, and lead vocals were now divided among the four instrumentalists, often with multiple lead vocalists on a single song. Brockett was now credited only as one of Nektar's four stage and lighting designers rather than as a member of the band, and did not appear in the group photo on the back cover. The album was more eclectic, although with shorter songs and fairly straightforward rhythms. Lyrically the album covered a wide range of subjects from Norse mythology and magic to more down to earth subjects like railroads and truck drivers.

In 1978 the band dissolved; however, in 1979 Albrighton and Freeman reformed the band with bassist Carmine Rojas and drummer Dave Prater and released a new album, Man in the Moon (1980), before the band dissolved once again in 1982.

Ian Curtis of Joy Division was a fan of the band and was photographed before he joined the band in a Nektar T-shirt.

=== 2000–present: Reformation and New Nektar ===
==== 2000–2018: Reformation ====
Nektar regrouped in 2000 with a line-up consisting of Albrighton, Freeman, and drummer Ray Hardwick, and in 2001, they released The Prodigal Son (2001). The following year, the band headlined NEARfest with the full classic line-up including Moore on bass, Howden on drums, and Larry Fast guesting on synthesizers. In 2003, Moore departed the band and was replaced by Randy Dembo. Nektar cut one more album, Evolution (2004), before Freeman was replaced by Tom Hughes. Dembo and Hughes left in August 2006, citing communication problems, money issues, personality issues, and trust in the management issues. Dembo was briefly replaced by a returning Carmine Rojas, before the band settled on a line-up that consisted of Albrighton, Howden, guitarist Steve Adams, bassist Desha Dunnahoe, and keyboardist Steve Mattern. However, this line up never performed live on stage.

In early 2006, the band found new management in Roy Clay to replace The Eclectic Records staff, and performed at progressive rock-themed festivals worldwide on a part-time basis, and occasionally appearing in some of their old haunts in the New Jersey/New York area. Clay was released from management duties early 2007 after a dispute over financial matters, and the band made an official complaint which exposed further fraudulent acts. Clay was ultimately convicted for fraud, lying, and forgery, and was jailed for 2 years and 11 months.

In mid-2007, a solo tour was undertaken by Albrighton. A full band tour of Europe (primarily Germany) was scheduled by a European-based promoter, but they had to postpone as extra funds were needed to complete the new album, Book of Days, which was not released until the following year, by which time Adams, Dunnahoe, and Mattern had departed the band. Book of Days featured more of Roye Albrighton's guitar work than previous Nektar albums.

In late 2007, the band embarked on a tour for which they performed Remember the Future in its entirety, the line-up now including Klaus Henatsch on keyboards and Peter Pichl on bass. In this formation they toured extensively through Europe in 2008. These concerts resulted in the highly acclaimed live double album Fortyfied (2011), which was released in 2009 under Roye's own Treacle Music label. In 2009, the band also played their first gig in the US again, appearing as headliners at the Rites of Spring Festival and a week-long tour along the East Coast.

In mid 2011, Lux Vibratus joined the band on bass for the Cleopatra Records' Space Rock Invasion Tour in the U.S. By the time the band came to record the covers album A Spoonful of Time, bass duties were shared by session musician Jürgen Engler, Mr. Big bassist Billy Sheehan, and former Yes member Billy Sherwood, who also served as the album's producer. The Albrighton-Howden-Henatsch-Sherwood line-up recorded and released Time Machine. A special post-recording show was put together at the Coach House in South Orange County, California. Returning to Nektar in 2013, Vibratus was on bass for the Cruise to the Edge voyage, followed by The Virada Cultural Festival in São Paulo, Brazil. In June, this line-up went on the road again for a U.S. tour billed as the U.K. Legends of Classic Rock. In January 2014, bassist Tom Fry joined the band for a European tour. On this tour Che Albrighton, Roye's son, made his first appearance as a drummer because Howden had a different engagement. Che had previously worked as tour manager for Nektar on several tours.

On 26 July 2016, Roye Albrighton died after an unspecified illness, at the age of 67. Following his death, Henatsch, Howden, and Fry decided to move on with the production of a new album with On Stage Records, the label they worked with since 2015. The first release was the double live album Live in Bremen (2017), which documents the last tour with Albrighton. After an audition in 2017, Henatsch, Howden, and Fry agreed to continue Nektar with Alexander Hoffmeister as their new frontman and guitarist.

==== 2018–present: Nektar (US-based band) ====
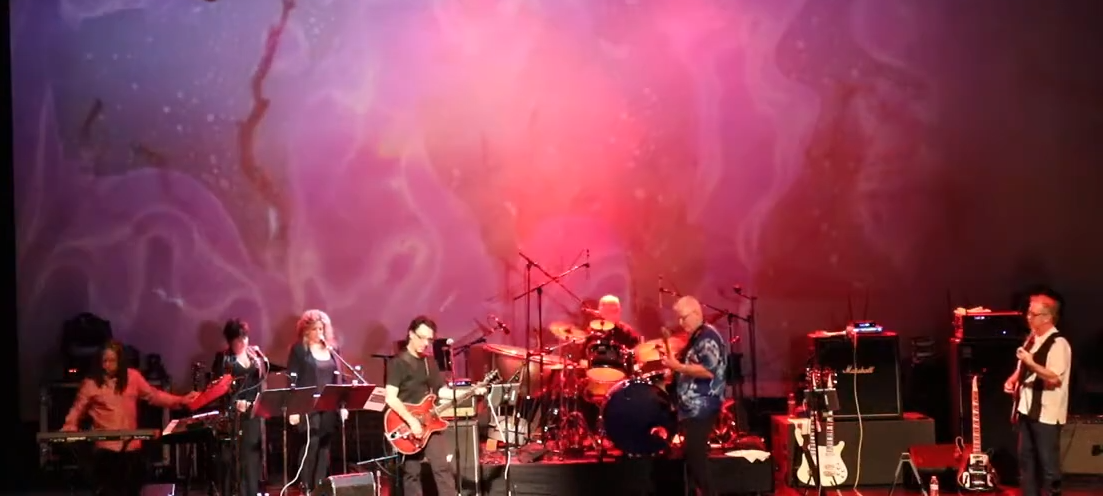
Nektar performing at Progstock in 2019

In early 2018, Howden left the band to found his own group, also named Nektar, and based in the US. He asked former bass player Moore to join, to which he agreed, which was followed by the addition of former members Randy Dembo, Mick Brockett (lights, projections and atmosphere), and Ryche Chlanda (guitar and vocals), and newcomer keyboardist Kendall Scott, a friend of Chlanda's.

The US line-up assembled a set of previously unrecorded tracks from Chlanda's time in the band, which were released on The Other Side as Nektar.

Original Nektar keyboardist Allan "Taff" Freeman died on 22 August 2021 at the age of 76.

On 29 September 2023, Ron Howden died at the age of 78 after years of numerous health issues, including cancer. This album would ultimately see a release in 2024 under the title Mission to Mars. After the passing of Ron Howden, Jay Dittamo has replaced him since 2024, featuring on Nektar's latest album Mission to Mars (2024) and touring with the band. As of 2025, bass player Randy Dembo no longer appears as a band member, neither on the band's website nor as a touring member.

==== 2018–present: New Nektar (Germany-based band) ====
The Germany-based Nektar operated under a new name, New Nektar, to create some distinction and distance from old successes. In 2018, New Nektar recorded the concept album Megalomania (2018), featuring Che Albrighton on drums, and completed the Megalomania Release Tour in December 2018. Che Albrighton was unavailable to participate, so he was replaced by Norbert "Panza" Lehmann. The US based line-up of Nektar (featuring Moore, Howden & Brockett) successfully challenged the rights of the German band to use the name Nektar and legal ownership of the band name reverted to the US based band.

== Personnel ==
=== Current members ===
==== United States-based band (since 2018) ====
- Derek "Mo" Moore – bass, keyboards, vocals and lyrics (1969–1978, 2002–2003, 2019–present)
- Mick Brockett – special effects, lyrics (1969–1977, 2002, 2019–present)
- Ryche Chlanda – guitars, lead vocals (1978, 2019–present)
- Kendall Scott – keyboards, orchestral programming, backing vocals (2019–present)
- Maryann Castello – vocals (since 2019)
- Jay Dittamo – drums (since 2024)

==== Germany-based band (also known as New Nektar since 2018) ====
- Klaus Henatsch – keyboards, backing vocals (2007–present)
- Alexander Hoffmeister – vocals, guitars (2017–present)
- Holger Trull – bass, backing vocals (2021–present)

=== Former members ===
- Allan "Taff" Freeman – keyboards, synthesisers, backing vocals (1969–1978, 1979–1980, 2000–2004; died 2021)
- Ron Howden – drums, percussion, backing vocals (1969–1978, 2003–2016, 2019–2023, his death)
- Roye Albrighton – guitars, bass, lead vocals (1969–1976, 1978, 1979–1982, 2000–2016; his death)
- Keith Walters – special effects (1969–1972)
- Larry Fast – synthesisers (1975–1978, 2002–2003)
- Dave Nelson – guitars, lead vocals (1976–1978)
- Carmine Rojas – bass, backing vocals (1979–1982, 2006)
- Dave Prater – drums, percussion, backing vocals (1979–1982)
- Tommi Schmidt – keyboards, backing vocals (1980–1982)
- Ray Hardwick – drums, percussion (2000–2003)
- Scott Krentz – percussion, vocals (2002)
- Randy Dembo – bass, 12-string guitar, bass pedals, backing vocals (2003–2006, 2019–2025)
- Tom Hughes – keyboards, backing vocals (2004–2006)
- Steve Adams – guitars, backing vocals (2006–2007)
- Desha Dunnahoe – bass, backing vocals (2006–2007)
- Steve Mattern – keyboards (2006–2007)
- Peter Pichl – bass (2007–2011)
- Lux Vibratus – bass (2011–2014)
- Billy Sherwood – bass (2013)
- Tom Fry – bass (2014–2019)
- Che Albrighton – drums (2014, 2018)
- Heike Nolden – bass (2019–2021)
- Norbert "Panza" Lehmann – drums, backing vocals (2018–2023; his death, Germany based-band)

=== Line-ups ===
Note: bold indicates a line-up change; (*) indicates returning member

==== Nektar ====
1969–1972	1972–1975	1975–1976	1976–1977
**Roye Albrighton** – guitars, lead vocals; **Allan "Taff" Freeman** – keyboards, synthesisers, backing vocals; **Derek "Mo" Moore** – bass, keyboards, backing vocals; **Ron Howden** – drums, percussion, backing vocals; **Mick Brockett** – special effects; **Keith Walters** – special effects	Roye Albrighton – guitars, lead vocals; Allan "Taff" Freeman – keyboards, synthesisers, backing vocals; Derek "Mo" Moore – bass, keyboards, backing vocals; Ron Howden – drums, percussion, backing vocals; Mick Brockett – special effects	Roye Albrighton – guitars, lead vocals; Allan "Taff" Freeman – keyboards, synthesisers, backing vocals; Derek "Mo" Moore – bass, keyboards, backing vocals; Ron Howden – drums, percussion, backing vocals; Mick Brockett – special effects; Additional personnel: **Larry Fast** – synthesisers	**Dave Nelson** – guitars, lead vocals; Allan "Taff" Freeman – keyboards, synthesisers, backing vocals; Derek "Mo" Moore – bass, keyboards, backing vocals; Ron Howden – drums, percussion, backing vocals; Mick Brockett – special effects; Additional personnel: Larry Fast – synthesisers
1977–1978	1978	1978	1978–1979
Dave Nelson – guitars, lead vocals; Allan "Taff" Freeman – keyboards, synthesisers, backing vocals; Derek "Mo" Moore – bass, keyboards, backing vocals; Ron Howden – drums, percussion, backing vocals; Additional personnel: Larry Fast – synthesisers	Dave Nelson – guitars, lead vocals; **Ryche Chlanda** – guitars, backing vocals; Allan "Taff" Freeman – keyboards, synthesisers, backing vocals; Derek "Mo" Moore – bass, keyboards, backing vocals; Ron Howden – drums, percussion, backing vocals; Mick Brockett – special effects; Additional personnel: Larry Fast – synthesisers	**Roye Albrighton*** – guitars, lead vocals; Allan "Taff" Freeman – keyboards, synthesisers, backing vocals; Derek "Mo" Moore – bass, keyboards, backing vocals; Ron Howden – drums, percussion, backing vocals	**Disbanded**
1979–1980	1980–1982	1982–2000	2000–2002
Roye Albrighton – guitars, lead vocals; Allan "Taff" Freeman – keyboards, synthesisers, backing vocals; **Carmine Rojas** – bass, backing vocals; **Dave Prater** – drums, percussion, backing vocals	Roye Albrighton – guitars, lead vocals; **Tommi Schmidt** – keyboards, synthesisers, backing vocals; Carmine Rojas – bass, backing vocals; Dave Prater – drums, percussion, backing vocals	**Disbanded**	Roye Albrighton – guitars, bass, lead vocals; **Allan "Taff" Freeman*** – keyboards, synthesisers, backing vocals; **Ray Hardwick** – drums, percussion
2002–2003	NEARfest 2002 Reunion	2003–2004	2004–2006
Roye Albrighton – guitars, lead vocals; Allan "Taff" Freeman – keyboards, synthesisers, backing vocals; **Larry Fast*** – synthesisers; **Derek "Mo" Moore*** – bass, keyboards, backing vocals; Ray Hardwick – drums, percussion	Roye Albrighton – guitars, lead vocals; Allan "Taff" Freeman – keyboards, synthesisers, backing vocals; Larry Fast – synthesisers; Derek "Mo" Moore – bass, keyboards, backing vocals; **Ron Howden*** – drums, percussion; **Mick Brockett*** – special effects; Additional personnel: **Scott Krentz** – percussion and vocals; **Michelle Eckert** – backing vocals; **Maureen McIntyre** – backing vocals	Roye Albrighton – guitars, lead vocals; Allan "Taff" Freeman (died 2021) – keyboards, synthesisers, backing vocals; **Randy Dembo** – bass, bass pedals, backing vocals; Ron Howden – drums, percussion, backing vocals	Roye Albrighton – guitars, lead vocals; **Tom Hughes** – keyboards, backing vocals; Randy Dembo – bass, bass pedals, backing vocals; Ron Howden – drums, percussion, backing vocals
2006–2007	2007–2011	2011–2014	2014–2016
Roye Albrighton – guitars, lead vocals; **Steve Adams** – guitars, backing vocals; **Steve Mattern** – keyboards; **Desha Dunnahoe** – bass, backing vocals; Ron Howden – drums, percussion, backing vocals	Roye Albrighton – guitars, lead vocals; **Klaus Henatsch** – keyboards, backing vocals; **Peter Pichl** – bass; Ron Howden – drums, percussion, backing vocals	Roye Albrighton – guitars, lead vocals; Klaus Henatsch – keyboards, backing vocals; **Lux Vibratus** – bass; **Billy Sherwood** – bass (2013); Ron Howden – drums, percussion, backing vocals	Roye Albrighton (died 2016) – guitars, lead vocals; Klaus Henatsch – keyboards, backing vocals; **Tom Fry** – bass; Ron Howden – drums, percussion, backing vocals; **Che Albrighton** – drums (2014)
2017–2018	2018–2019	2019–2021	2021–present
**Alexander Hoffmeister** – guitars, vocal; Klaus Henatsch – keyboards; Tom Fry – bass; Ron Howden – drums, percussion, backing vocals; Che Albrighton – drums (2018)	as **"New Nektar"** (Germany-based band): Alexander Hoffmeister – guitars, vocal; Klaus Henatsch – keyboards; Tom Fry – bass; **Norbert "Panza" Lehmann** – drums, backing vocals	as **"New Nektar"** (Germany-based band): Alexander Hoffmeister – guitars, vocal; Klaus Henatsch – keyboards; **Heike Nolden** – bass (2019-2021); Norbert "Panza" Lehmann – drums, backing vocals	as **"New Nektar"** (Germany-based band): Alexander Hoffmeister – guitars, vocal; Klaus Henatsch – keyboards; **Holger Trull** – bass, backing vocals (2021-present); Norbert "Panza" Lehmann – drums, backing vocals

==== Nektar (US-based band) ====
2018–2020	2020–2023	2024–2025	2025
**Ryche Chlanda*** – guitars, vocal; **Kendall Scott** – keyboards; **Derek "Mo" Moore*** – bass, keyboards, vocals; **Randy Dembo*** – bass, 12-string guitar, bass pedals, backing vocals; **Ron Howden** (died 2023) – drums, percussion, backing vocals; **Mick Brockett*** – special effects; **Maryann Castello** - vocals	**Ryche Chlanda*** – guitars, vocal; **Kendall Scott** – keyboards; **Derek "Mo" Moore*** – bass, keyboards, vocals; **Randy Dembo*** – bass, 12-string guitar, bass pedals, backing vocals; **Ron Howden** (died 2023) – drums, percussion, backing vocals; **Mick Brockett*** – special effects; **Maryann Castello** – vocals	**Ryche Chlanda*** – guitars, vocal; **Kendall Scott** – keyboards; **Derek "Mo" Moore*** – bass, keyboards, vocals; **Randy Dembo*** – bass, 12-string guitar, bass pedals, backing vocals; **Jay Dittamo** – drums, percussion; **Mick Brockett*** – special effects; **Maryann Castello** – vocals	**Ryche Chlanda*** – guitars, vocal; **Kendall Scott** – keyboards; **Derek "Mo" Moore*** – bass, keyboards, vocals; **Jay Dittamo** – drums, percussion; **Mick Brockett*** – special effects; **Maryann Castello** – vocals

== Discography ==
=== Studio albums ===
Year	Album	US	CAN	AUS
1971	Journey to the Centre of the Eye	–	–	–
1972	A Tab in the Ocean	141	–	–
1973	...Sounds Like This	–	–	–
1973	Remember the Future	19	23	72
1974	Down to Earth	32	37	93
1975	Recycled	89	–	–
1977	Magic Is a Child	172	–	–
1980	Man in the Moon	–	–	–
2001	The Prodigal Son	–	–	–
2004	Evolution	–	–	–
2008	Book of Days	–	–	–
2012	A Spoonful of Time	–	–	–
2013	Time Machine	–	–	–
2020	The Other Side (released as Nektar, the US-based band)	–	–	–
2024	Mission to Mars (released as Nektar, the US-based band)	–	–	–

=== Live albums ===
Year	Album
1974	Sunday Night at London Roundhouse (5 tracks)
1977	Live in New York
1978	More Live Nektar in New York
2002	Sunday Night at London Roundhouse Expanded version (10 tracks)
2002	Unidentified Flying Abstract - Live at Chipping Norton 1974
2004	Greatest Hits Live
2005	2004 Tour Live
2005	Door to the Future - The Lightshow Tapes Volume 1
2005	Live in Germany 2005
2008	Live in Detroit 1975
2011	Fortyfied
2011	Complete Live In New York 1974 (compiles Live in New York + More Live Nektar in New York)
2011	Greatest Hits Volume 1 (Re-release of CD 1 of Greatest Hits Live)
2011	Greatest Hits Volume 2 (Re-release of CD 2 of Greatest Hits Live)
2014	Live at the Patriots Theater (re-release of Greatest Hits Live)
2015	Up Close (Roye Albrighton)
2017	Live in Bremen
2019	Live Anthology 1974-1976
2021	Sounds Like Swiss

=== Compilation albums ===
Year	Album
1976	Nektar
1978	Thru the Ears
1978	Best of Nektar
1994	Highlights
1998	The Dream Nebula: The Best of 1971–1975
2008	The Boston Tapes
2011	Retrospektiv 1969–1980

=== Singles ===
Year	Title	Billboard Hot 100	Album
1973	"Do You Believe in Magic?"	-	...Sounds Like This
1974	"What Ya Gonna Do?"	-	...Sounds Like This
1974	"Remember the Future (Edit)"	-	Remember the Future
1974	"Fidgety Queen'"	-	Down to Earth
1974	"Astral Man"	91	Down to Earth
1975	"Flight to Reality"	-	Recycled
2005	"Always"	-	Evolution

== Videography ==
=== Video albums ===
Year	Title
2003	Live
2005	Pure: Live in Germany 2005
2015	Up Close (Roye Albrighton)
