= Hoelderlin =

- Origin: Germany
- Genres: Progressive rock, progressive folk
- Years active: 1970–1980, 2005–2009
- Labels: Pilz, Spiegelei (Intercord)

Hoelderlin were a German progressive rock band that was formed in 1970 as Hölderlin by brothers Joachim and Christian von Grumbkow with Nanny de Ruig, whom Christian was married to. They were influenced by rock, jazz, and folk music.

== History ==
The group started out as a folk group, but after the release of their first album in 1972 and the departure of Nanny in 1973, the group began to change musical direction, incorporating jazz and rock. They changed their name to Hoelderlin in 1973 and took legal action against Rolf-Ulrich Kaiser, the head and founder of the label Pilz, which eventually led to the record label going out of business. In 1975 they got a new record contract with the label Spiegelei and released their second album the same year. After the release of three more albums, almost all of the founding members left the group, leaving Joachim to be the only remaining founding member. This led to both a significant change in lineup and another significant change in musical direction. The group was introduced to Dave Hutchins, who was an engineer for the Genesis album The Lamb Lies Down on Broadway and subsequently decided to develop an anglo-american commercial sound that later resulted in two more albums before their split in 1980. The album Fata Morgana was then put together and released by Spiegelei the following year. The group reunited in 2005 with only Hans Bäär and Michael Bruchmann as former members. However, Christoph and Nanny made special guest appearances for a few of their subsequent performances. Upon the release of their eighth album, the group then split up again in 2009.

== Discography ==
- Hölderlins Traum (Pilz, 1972)
- Hoelderlin (Spiegelei, 1975)
- Clown & Clouds (1976)
- Rare Birds (1977)
- Traumstadt (Live Album, 1978)
- New Faces (1979)
- Fata Morgana (1981)
- 8 (2007)
- Hoelderlin - Live At Rockpalast 2005 (2021)

== Personnel ==
- Michael Bruchmann - drums (1971-1978, 2005-2009)
- Hans Bäär - bass, guitars, vocals (1976-1981, 2005-2009)
- Ann-Yi Eötvös - vocals (2005-2009)
- Andreas Hirschmann - keyboards, vocals (2005-2009)
- Dirk Schilling - guitar, live electronics (2005-2008)
- Joachim von Grumbkow - keyboards, vocals (1970-1981) (died 1990)
- Christian von Grumbkow - guitar (1970-1977), lyrics (1970-1978)
- Christoph Noppeney - violin (1971-1977), guitar, vocals (1975-1978)
- Tommy L'Ohr - guitar, vocals (1977-1981)
- Peter Käseberg - bass, vocals (1970-1975)
- Eduard Schicke - drums (1978-1981)
- Nanny de Ruig (1970-1972)
- Pablo Weeber - guitar, vocals (1976-1977)

== See also ==
- Friedrich Hölderlin, the German poet
