= Pilz (record label) =

German record label 1971–1972; imprint of BASF Musikproduktion

- Parent company: BASF
- Founded: 1971
- Status: Inactive
- Genre: Various/cosmic/folk
- Country of origin: Germany

Pilz (German for ‘mushroom’) was a German record label, set up in Berlin in 1971 by German music mogul Rolf-Ulrich Kaiser, who also established the label Ohr.

== History ==
Pilz was a sublabel of BASF, a major record company in Germany at that time. A number of artists who released records on Pilz, such as Witthuser & Westrupp, also put out music on Ohr and/or Cosmic Couriers, another of Kaiser’s record labels.

The label’s logo was a mushroom, found on the sleeves and on the labels of the records. In all, there were 20 albums and 7 singles released on Pilz. Most were psychedelic or cosmic rock with folk influences. Lyrics/vocals were sometimes in German, although some of the albums were purely instrumental.

Popol Vuh are probably the best known of Pilz artists, having released numerous albums during their career, including several film scores, many of them highly regarded by critics and fans. ‘In Der Garten Pharoas’ is considered a classic by many. Wallenstein had some success during the 70s and in more recent years with reissues, while Witthuser & Westrupp’s albums remain cult favourites. Popol Vuh’s ‘Hosianna Mantra’ was the final release before the label folded in 1972. ‘Hosianna Mantra’ has been covered in its entirety by Kawabata Makoto of Acid Mothers Temple.

== Discography ==
- Catalog number - Artist, Title, Year

Albums

- 15 21114-2 - Various Artists, Heavy Christmas, 1971
- 20 20114-7 - Dies Irae, First, 1971
- 20 21088-2 - Flute & Voice, Imaginations of Light, 1971
- 20 21090-1 - Joy Unlimited, Schmetterlinge, 1971
- 20 21095-2 - Ardo Dombec, Ardo Dombec , 1971
- 20 21098-7 - Witthüser & Westrupp, Der Jesuspilz - Musik vom Evangelium, 1971
- 20 21099-5 - Rufus Zuphall, Phallobst, 1971
- 20 21100-2 - Bröselmaschine, Bröselmaschine, 1971
- 20 21102-9 - Virus, Thoughts, 1971
- 20 21103-7 - McChurch Soundroom, Delusion, 1971
- 20 21276-9 - Popol Vuh, In den Gärten Pharaos, 1971
- 20 21314-5 - Hölderlin, Hölderlins Traum, 1972
- 20 29064-6 - Wallenstein, Blitzkrieg, 1972
- 20 29077-8 - Emtidi, Saat, 1972
- 20 29097-2 - Anima, Anima, 1972
- 20 29113-8 - Wallenstein, Mother Universe, 1972
- 20 29115-4 - Witthüser & Westrupp, Bauer Plath, 1972
- 20 29116-2 - Various Artists, Rapunzel - Neue Deutsche Volksmusik, 1972
- 20 29131-6 - Jerry Berkers, Unterwegs, 1972
- 20 29143-1 - Popol Vuh, Hosianna Mantra, 1972

Singles

- 05 10147-3 - Elga, Cajun Man / Streets of London, 1971
- 05 11101-0 - Virus, King Heroin / Take Your Thoughts, 1971
- 05 11106-1 - Dies Irae, Lucifer / Tired, 1971
- 05 19041-7 - Witthüser & Westrupp, Die Erleuchtung / Die Aussendung, 1971
- 05 11556-3 - Joy Unlimited, Early Morning Moanin' / Proud Angelina, 1972
- 05 19128-6 - Jerry Berkers, Na na na chu chu chu / Es wird morgen vorbei sein, 1972
- 05 19134-0 - Witthüser & Westrupp, Bauer Plath / Das Lied der Liebe, 1972

== See also ==
- List of record labels
