= Wolperath =

Coordinates: 50°50′N 7°19′E

Wolperath is the third largest urban subdivision (Ortsteil) of the Neunkirchen-Seelscheid municipality in North Rhine-Westphalia, Rhein-Sieg, Germany. It is located southeast of Neunkirchen proper.
