= Wallenstein (band) =

German rock band

- Origin: Viersen, Rhineland, Germany
- Genres: Progressive rock, symphonic rock, space rock, hard rock, krautrock
- Years active: 1971–1982
- Labels: Pilz, Ohr, ZYX, Spalax Music, Belle Antique, Think Progressive, BASF, Kosmische Musik, PDU, King, RCA, Harvest, Clear Light of Jupiter
- Past members: Jürgen Dollase; Bill Barone; Harald Grosskopf; Jerry Berkers; Wolfgang Steinicke; Joachim Reiser; Dieter Meier; Jürgen Pluta; Gerd Klöcker; Nicky Gebhard; Jakob "Jaky" Diener; Michael Dommers; Pete Brough; Charly Terstappen; Joachim "Kim" Merz; Kurt Schmidt

Wallenstein was a West German rock band, formed in Viersen in Lower Rhineland, later based in Mönchengladbach, and active from 1971 to 1982. The band was later associated with the Krautrock genre of the 1970s.

== History ==
Wallenstein was founded in the summer of 1971 under the martial name of Blitzkrieg by the ambitious student of art (at the Art Academy Düsseldorf), Jürgen Dollase, from Viersen. He had already been trained in classical music, playing the piano and the double bass, and he had played in skiffle as well as in jazz formations. In addition, the businessman and band manager, Peter Gielen (Octopus Productions) from Mönchengladbach-Hehnerholt, and Corrado Faccioni, Italian buddy and former road manager of Dollase, were involved in the foundation. Wallenstein started as a kind of "test-tube child", because Dollase and Roadie Faccioni gathered the initial lineup from other bands. The first solo-guitarist of the group was Wolfgang "Ginger" Steinicke from Erkelenz, today a renowned astronomer; but the former member of Smiddys Blues Band was soon replaced by the American William (Bill) Joseph Barone from Philadelphia because Steinicke's studies in physics or astrophysics and mathematics were his highest priority. Jürgen Dollase had already been able to win over Harald Grosskopf from Hildesheim, and Dutchman Ger (Jerry) Berkers (now deceased) from Brunssum was taken on board shortly after Bill Barone.

Because the name Blitzkrieg was already in use by an English band (but was often misspelled Blitzkreig by the British music press), and because the name was far from being politically correct for the German record labels of that time, the group named itself after the Thirty Years' War commander Albrecht von Wallenstein in early 1972. Also in early 1972, the debut album of the classical or art rockers was released. It had been recorded in the studio of Dieter Dierks in Stommeln near Cologne from September to December 1971 and it was titled after the first name of the band. In the same year, the German record label Pilz released Mother Universe, succeeding the debut album (also from the Pilz record label) as fast as lightning (Blitz). (Rem.: The album cover photo by Harald Grosskopf depicts Dollase's grandmother.)

In 1978, after some changes in the musical style, Dollase replaced all members of the band. Because of their performance in the ZDF broadcast Disco with Ilja Richter in 1979, the band reached place 17 in the German pop charts with their single Charline. But the single Don't Let It Be (from the album Blue Eyed Boys) was also rather successful later and sold very well. From March to June 1981, Wallenstein went on their last tour; the group finally disbanded in 1982.

== Discography ==
- Blitzkrieg (recorded in 1971, released in 1972)
- Mother Universe (1972)
- Cosmic Century (1973)
- Stories, Songs & Symphonies (1975)
- No More Love (1977)
- Charline (1978)
- Blue Eyed Boys (1979)
- Fräuleins (1980)
- SSSSS…TOP (1981)
