= Book of Days (Nektar album) =

Studio album by Nektar
- Released: 16 May 2008
- Genre: Progressive rock
- Length: 54:47
- Label: Bacillus

Nektar chronology
Evolution (2004)	Book of Days (2008)	A Spoonful of Time (2012)

Alternative cover

Book of Days is the eleventh studio album by the progressive rock band Nektar, released in 2008. It was preceded by the departures of keyboardist Alan "Taff" Freeman, who up until this point had been the only member of Nektar to appear on all of their albums, and bassist Randy Dembo. Two original band members, guitarist/frontman Roye Albrighton and drummer Ron Howden, were joined by keyboardist Steve Mattern, bassist Desha Dunnahoe, and guitarist Steve Adams.

For the deluxe release, Albrighton's solo album The Follies of Rupert Treacle was included.

== Track listing ==
All tracks are written by Roye Albrighton.

No.	Title	Length
1.	"Over Krakatoa"	5:07
2.	"King of the Deep"	8:51
3.	"Lamorna"	1:28
4.	"Doctor Kool"	11:10
5.	"The Iceman"	10:29
6.	"Where Are You Now"	10:44
7.	"Book of Days (Between the Lines)"	3:27
8.	"Book of Days"	3:31

== Personnel ==
- Roye Albrighton – Guitars, Lead Vocals
- Ron Howden – Drums, Backing Vocals
- Steve Adams – Guitars, Backing Vocals
- Steve Mattern – Hammond Organ, Keyboards
- Desha Dunnahoe – Bass, Backing Vocals
