= Magic Is a Child =

Magic Is A Child

Studio album by Nektar
- Released: September 1977
- Recorded: March – August 1977
- Studio: The House Of Music, West Orange, New Jersey
- Genre: Progressive rock
- Length: 41:24
- Label: Polydor
- Producer: Jeffrey Kawalek

Nektar chronology
Live in New York (1977)	Magic Is A Child (1977)	More Live Nektar in New York (1978)

Magic Is A Child is the seventh album from English progressive rock band Nektar. This album is one of only two studio albums released by Nektar without Roye Albrighton on guitar and lead vocals; the other is The Other Side (2020). In addition, founding member Mick Brockett was no longer credited as a member of Nektar, only as one of their four stage and lighting designers. Dave Nelson took Albrighton's place on guitar, while lead vocal duties were now divided among drummer Ron Howden, bassist Mo Moore, and Nelson.

Brooke Shields, 12 years old at the time, is the model on the cover.

The track "Train from Nowhere", on the 2005 remastered edition, features Robert Fripp of King Crimson on lead guitar (under the pseudonym “Walt Nektroid") that was left out of the original version.

== Reception ==
Professional ratings
Review scores
Source	Rating
Allmusic	4/5 stars

AllMusic gave the album a positive retrospective review, praising Nektar's switching to "shorter, punchier songs", "swelling" keyboards, "symphonic" guitars, and "breezy pop".

== Track listing ==
Side one
No.	Title	Writer(s)	Lead vocals	Length
1.	"Away from Asgard"	Derek Moore, Ron Howden, Taff Freeman, Dave Nelson, Steve Barth	Howden, Nelson, and Moore	5:30
2.	"Magic Is a Child"	Moore, Howden, Freeman, Nelson, Barth	Howden and Moore	4:06
3.	"Eerie Lackawanna"	Moore, Howden, Freeman, Nelson, Barth	Nelson	3:29
4.	"Midnight Lite"	Moore, Howden, Freeman, Nelson, Barth	Moore	4:27
5.	"Love to Share (Keep Your Worries Behind You)"	Moore, Howden, Freeman, Nelson	Howden and Moore	4:07

Side two
No.	Title	Writer(s)	Lead vocals	Length
6.	"Train from Nowhere"	Moore, Howden, Freeman, Nelson	Nelson	4:12
7.	"Listen"	Moore, Howden, Freeman, Nelson, Roye Albrighton	Nelson	6:02
8.	"On the Run (The Trucker)"	Moore, Howden, Freeman, Nelson	Howden	4:41
9.	"Spread Your Wings"	Moore, Howden, Freeman, Nelson	Nelson	4:40

== Personnel ==
- Dave Nelson - guitar, lead and backing vocals
- Alan "Taff" Freeman - keyboards (including synthesizer), backing vocals
- Derek "Mo" Moore - bass, lead and backing vocals
- Ron Howden - drums, percussion, lead and backing vocals, Smurds

Additional personnel

- Julien Barber, Kermit Moore, Michael Commins, Anthony Posk - string quartet
- Larry Fast - synthesizer, programming, processing
- Walt Nektroid (Robert Fripp) - guitar on "Train from Nowhere"
- Jeffrey Kawalek - production, engineering, backing vocal on "Love to Share (Keep Your Worries Behind You)"

== Charts ==
Chart (1977)	Peak position
US Billboard 200	172
