= Bellaphon Records =

German record label

- Founded: 1961
- Founder: Branislav Zivanovic
- Genre: Various
- Country of origin: Germany
- Location: Frankfurt
- Official website: bellaphon.de

Bellaphon Records is an independent German record label of Bellaphon records GmbH. The label produces its own artists and distributes those of other labels.

== Recording artists ==
- Chuck Bennett
- Johnny Cash
- The Flippers
- Ganymed
- Geordie
- Joan Jett & the Blackhearts
- Fahrenheit 212 (de)
- Franz Lambert
- Limahl
- Merger
- Nektar
- Böhse Onkelz
- Suzi Quatro
- Ringo Starr
- Orion aka Jimmy Ellis

== History ==
Bellaphon were founded in 1961 by Branislav "Branco" Zivanovic (1923–1993). The company is headquartered in Frankfurt.

=== Labels owned ===
In 1972, Bellaphon Records Riedel & Co. KG owned Bellaphon Records and Admiral Records.

=== Labels represented ===
In 1972, Bellaphon Records Riedel & Co. KG represented Musidisc (France); Orange and Reflection (both of the United Kingdom); Audio Fidelity, Bang, Brunswick, Cadet, Cadet/Concept, Casablanca, Checker, Chess, Fantasy/Galaxy, and Hot Wax (all of the United States); Janus and GRT (both of Canada).

=== Labels distributed ===
In 1982, Bellaphon Import was the distributor of 65 small German rock, pop, and jazz labels throughout West Germany. The labels included Bacillus and a popular jazz and blues label, L&R. Other notable labels distributed by Bellaphon included Concord and Enja.

== Death of its founder ==
Branco Zivanovic died on May 29, 1993, in Frankfurt, while serving as President of Bellaphon. His widow, Jutta Zivanovic-Riedel, took over as head of the company. She reportedly did not have a good hand for this business and lost the distributed labels and nearly all the artists over the years. Only a few German schlager artists (e.g. Gaby Baginsky, Michael Morgan) and a few international artists (Olivia Newton-John, Graeham Goble) were left to distribute.
