= City Raga =

Studio album by Popol Vuh
- Released: 1995
- Genre: Electronic, trance, worldbeat, new age
- Length: 46:24
- Label: Milan

Popol Vuh chronology
For You and Me (1991)	City Raga (1995)	Shepherd's Symphony – Hirtensymphonie (1997)

City Raga is the eighteenth album by Popol Vuh which was originally released in 1995 on Milan Records.

In this album, Popol Vuh plays a style of music which is similar to bands like Enigma, Deep Forest or Banco de Gaia, mixing electronic music and dance rhythms with ethnic chants and the sampled voice of singer Maya Rose rather than the krautrock, psychedelic rock and ambient music of their previous releases. Because of this, City Raga remains generally a controversial release among Popol Vuh's fanbase.

AllMusic noted the style of the album as "sounding surprisingly similar to contemporary electronic and new age."

== Track listing ==
All tracks composed by Florian Fricke, Guido Hieronymus, and Maya Rose except where noted.

No.	Title	Length
1.	"Wanted Maya"	7:00
2.	"Tears Of Concrete"	5:30
3.	"Last Village" (written by Fricke and Hieronymus)	7:10
4.	"City Raga"	8:10
5.	"Morning Raga" (written by Fricke, Daniel Fichelscher and Hieronymus)	5:40
6.	"Running Deep" (written by Fricke and Hieronymus)	6:00
7.	"City Raga (Mystic House Mix)"	6:41
Total length:		46:11

== Personnel ==
- Florian Fricke – piano
- Guido Hieronymus – keyboards, electric guitar
- Maya Rose – vocals

Guest musicians

- Daniel Fichelscher – acoustic guitar (on 5)
- Children's choir from Kathmandu

== Recording ==
- It was recorded at New African Studio, Munich between June and September 1994. It features additional contributions including product and sound consulting by Johannes Fricke and Gerhard Augustin, production by Florian Fricke and Frank Fiedler, and product management by Hubert Hass.
