= Seligpreisung =

Studio album by Popol Vuh
- Released: May 1973
- Recorded: Baumburg, Altenmarkt/Alz; Stommeln, Cologne
- Genre: Krautrock; psychedelic rock
- Length: 29:00
- Label: Kosmische Musik

Popol Vuh chronology
Hosianna Mantra (1972)	Seligpreisung (1973)	Einsjäger und Siebenjäger (1974)

Seligpreisung is the fourth album by German band Popol Vuh. It was originally released in 1973 on record label Kosmische Musik. The title is the German name for the Beatitudes, from Christ's Sermon on the Mount.

== Release ==
In 2004 SPV re-released the album with one bonus track, "Be in Love (Du sollst lieben)", originally released in 1972 on a solo single by Korean vocalist Djong Yun.

== Reception ==
Professional ratings
Review scores
Source	Rating
AllMusic	3/5 stars

Perfect Sound Forever described it as "another soaring, beautiful, essential and seminal work, sounding not only unique in the world of music, but among all other Popol Vuh albums."

== Track listing ==
All tracks composed by Florian Fricke. Original lyrics from the Gospel of Matthew, revised by Florian Fricke.

Side one
No.	Title	Length
1.	"Selig sind, die da hungern. Selig sind, die da dürsten nach Gerechtigkeit. Ja, sie sollen satt werden"	6:00
2.	"Tanz der Chassidim"	3:15
3.	"Selig sind, die da hier weinen. Ja, sie sollen später lachen"	5:08

Side two
No.	Title	Length
1.	"Selig sind, die da willig arm sind. Ja, ihrer ist das Himmelreich"	3:12
2.	"Selig sind, die da Leid klagen. Ja, sie sollen getröstet werden"	3:39
3.	"Selig sind, die Sanftmütigen. Ja, sie werden einst die Erde erben"	2:31
4.	"Selig sind, die da reinen Herzens sind. Ja, sie sollen Gott schauen"	2:33
5.	"Ja, sie sollen Gottes Kinder heißen. Agnus dei, agnus dei"	2:42

2004 bonus track

9. "Be in Love (Du sollst lieben)" – 4:59

== Personnel ==
- Florian Fricke – piano, cembalo, vocals, production
- Daniel Fichelscher – electric guitar (on 2, 3, 4, 6), drums, percussion, production
- Conny Veit – electric guitar, 12-string guitar, production
- Robert Eliscu – oboe, production
- Klaus Wiese – tamboura, production

Guest musicians

- Djong Yun – vocals (on 9)
- Fritz Sonnleitner – violin (on 9)

Technical personnel

- Dieter Dierks – engineering
- Heiner – engineering assistance
- Reinhardt Langowski – production
- Ingo Trauer – cover design
- Richard J. Rudow – cover design
- Bettina Fricke – sleeve photography
- Kranz – sleeve photography
