= Aguirre (soundtrack) =

Studio album by Popol Vuh
- Released: 1975
- Recorded: 1972–1974
- Genre: New-age; ambient; raga rock; krautrock
- Length: 43:47
- Label: Ohr
- Producer: Popol Vuh

Popol Vuh chronology
Das Hohelied Salomos (1975)	Aguirre (1975)	Letzte Tage – Letzte Nächte (1976)

Professional ratings
Review scores
Source	Rating
Allmusic	3.5/5 stars

Aguirre is the seventh album by German band Popol Vuh. It contains music used in the soundtrack to Werner Herzog's film Aguirre, the Wrath of God (1972), first released as an album in 1975 on Ohr, and reissued in 2004 by SPV with one bonus track. The soundtrack gained the band comparisons to renowned ambient musician Brian Eno. This score was the first of many filmic collaborations between the group and Herzog. Only two tracks ("Aguirre I" and "Aguirre II") are from the film; the rest were gathered from various recordings done by the group during the period 1972–74, including alternative versions of two songs ("Morgengruß II" and "Agnus Dei") originally released on the band's 1974 album, Einsjäger und Siebenjäger.

== Track listing ==
All tracks composed by Florian Fricke except track number 2 composed by Daniel Fichelscher.

Side 1
No.	Title	Length
1.	"Aguirre I": I. "L'Acrime di Rei"; II. "Flöte"	7:22
2.	"Morgengruß II"	2:55
3.	"Aguirre II"	6:15
4.	"Agnus Dei"	3:03

Side 2
No.	Title	Length
5.	"Vergegenwärtigung"	16:51

2004 CD bonus track
No.	Title	Length
6.	"Aguirre III"	7:16

== Personnel ==
- Florian Fricke – piano (on track 4), Moog synthesizer, Choir-Organ (on tracks 1, 3, 5, and (on SPV release only) 6)
- Daniel Fichelscher – electric guitar (on tracks 2, 3, and 4), acoustic guitar (on tracks 2, 3 and 4), drums (on track 4)
- Djong Yun – vocals
- Robert Eliscu – oboe (on track 4), pan pipe (on track 1, part b ["Flöte"]), (also believed to be playing) flute (on track 4)
- Holger Trülzsch (uncredited) – African and Turkish percussion ([on SPV release] on track 6)
- Conny Veit (uncredited, but believed to be there) – Electric guitar (on tracks 1 and 3)

== Cover versions ==
- Dernière Volonté – "Der Zorn Gottes" from the album Le Feu Sacré
