= Agape – Agape =

Studio album by Popol Vuh
- Released: 1983
- Recorded: June 1982–October 1982
- Genre: New-age
- Length: 37:25
- Label: Uniton (Norway)
- Producer: Florian Fricke, Popol Vuh

Popol Vuh chronology
Sei still, wisse ICH BIN (1981)	Agape – Agape (1983)	Spirit of Peace (1985)

Professional ratings
Review scores
Source	Rating
Allmusic	4/5 stars

Agape – Agape / Love – Love is the fourteenth album by Popol Vuh. It was originally released in 1983 on Uniton. In 2004 SPV re-released the album with one bonus track.

== Track listing ==
All tracks composed by Florian Fricke except where noted.

1. "Hand in Hand" – 2:52
2. "They Danced, They Laughed, As of Old" (Daniel Fichelscher) – 4:49
3. "Love, Life, Death" – 1:28
4. "The Christ Is Near" – 3:50
5. "Love – Love" – 5:20
6. "Behold, the Drover Summonds" – 5:52
7. "Agape – Agape" – 4:55
8. "Why Do I Still Sleep" – 7:58

2004 bonus track

9. "Circledance" (Fricke, Fichelscher) – 2:36

== Personnel ==
- Florian Fricke – piano, vocals, percussion
- Daniel Fichelscher – guitar, percussion, vocals
- Conny Veit – guitar
- Renate Knaup – vocals

Guest musicians

- Frank Fielder
- Jan Lorck-Schierning
- Nina

== Production ==
- Produced by Florian Fricke and Popol Vuh
- Recorded and mixed by Stefan Massimo Jauch, Peter Kramper, Angie Melitoupulos
- Recorded at Bavaria Studio, Munich, June–October 1982
- Cover design by Bengt Olson

== Liner notes ==
Behold, the drover summons:
Why do I still sleep?
Behold, the drover summons:
Agape, Agape
Hand in hand.
Behold, the drover summons:
Ha Ram Sam Sam
Ha Ram Sam Sam
Gully Gully, Gully Gully
Gully Ram Ram Sam
Agape, Agape
Love, love
Why do I still sleep?
