= Hosianna Mantra =

Studio album by Popol Vuh
- Released: 1972
- Genres: Krautrock; chamber music; new-age; world music
- Length: 37:27
- Label: Pilz

Popol Vuh chronology
| In den Gärten Pharaos (1971) | Hosianna Mantra (1972) | Seligpreisung (1973) |

Professional ratings
Review scores
| Source | Rating |
|---|---|
| AllMusic | 4/5 stars |
| Pitchfork | 9.5/10 |
| Sputnikmusic | 4.5/5 stars |

Hosianna Mantra is the third album by German band Popol Vuh. It was originally released in 1972 on the German record label Pilz. The album saw the band blend elements of Western classical music, Asian music, and space rock. For the release, bandleader Florian Fricke abandoned electronic synthesizers and instead employed acoustic instruments such as piano, oboe, and tambura. Prominently featured are Korean vocalist Djong Yun and electric guitarist Conny Veit.

== Release ==
In 2004 SPV re-released the album with one bonus track, "Maria (Ave Maria)", originally released on a 1972 solo single by Korean vocalist Djong Yun.

== Critical reception ==
Hosianna Mantra has garnered acclaim from English-language publications in recent years. Writing for The Sydney Morning Herald, Chris Johnston praised it as "bold, beautiful, and lying at the outer reaches even of krautrock, the German indie music of the 1970s." Wilson Neate of AllMusic remarked that the album has a "timeless, healing quality" that is "far removed from the everyday world and yet at one with it." Raul Stanciu of Sputnikmusic called the work "an overlooked masterpiece", and Gary Bearman of Perfect Sound Forever likewise described it as "majestic – a revelation, an epiphany, a high point in the history of music."

== Track listing ==
All tracks composed by Florian Fricke (Note: On original release Fricke is credited as Popol Vuh.). Lyrics based on original texts by Martin Buber.

1. "Ah!" – 4:40
2. "Kyrie" – 5:23
3. "Hosianna Mantra" – 10:09
4. "Abschied" – 3:14
5. "Segnung" – 6:07
6. "Andacht" – 0:47
7. "Nicht hoch im Himmel" – 6:18
8. "Andacht" – 0:46

2004 bonus track

9. "Maria (Ave Maria)" – 4:30

== Personnel ==
- Florian Fricke – piano, cembalo, production
- Conny Veit – electric guitar, 12-string guitar, production
- Robert Eliscu – oboe, production
- Djong Yun – vocals, production
- Klaus Wiese – tamboura, production

Additional personnel

- Fritz Sonnleitner – violin

Technical personnel

- Peter Kramper – mixing
- Wolfgang Loeper – engineering
- Hans Endrulat – engineering
- Toni Heudorf – engineering assistance
- Ingo Trauer – album cover design
- Richard J. Rudow – album cover design
- Bettina Fricke – sleeve photography
