= Herz aus Glas (album) =

Herz aus Glas (Cœur de verre, Heart of Glass)
- french edition titled "Coeur de verre"

Soundtrack album by Popol Vuh
- Released: 1977
- Genre: Krautrock
- Length: 33:23
- Label: Brain Records
- Producer: Florian Fricke, Renate Knaup

Popol Vuh chronology
Letzte Tage – Letzte Nächte (1976)	Herz aus Glas (Cœur de verre, Heart of Glass) (1977)	Brüder des Schattens – Söhne des Lichts (1978)

Professional ratings
Review scores
Source	Rating
AllMusic	4.5/5 stars

Herz aus Glas (subtitled "Singet, denn der Gesang vertreibt die Wölfe" [German for "Sing, for singing drives away the wolves"], French "Cœur de verre") is the ninth album by Popol Vuh. It was originally released in 1977 on Brain Records. In 2005 SPV re-released the album with two bonus tracks. This album was released as the original motion picture soundtrack of Heart of Glass (Original German title: "Herz aus Glas", French title "Coeur de verre") by German director Werner Herzog, but in fact only two tracks ("Engel der Gegenwart" and "Hüter der Schwelle") were actually featured in the film.

== Track listing ==
All tracks composed by Florian Fricke except tracks 5 and 8 composed by Daniel Fichelscher.

1. "Engel der Gegenwart" – 8:18
2. "Blätter aus dem Buch der Kühnheit" – 4:19
3. "Das Lied von den hohen Bergen" – 4:12
4. "Hüter der Schwelle" – 3:47
5. "Der Ruf" – 4:42
6. "Singet, denn der Gesang vertreibt die Wölfe" – 4:15
7. "Gemeinschaft" – 3:50

2005 bonus tracks

8. "Auf dem Weg - On The Way" (Alternative Guitar Version) – 4:42
9. "Hand in Hand in Hand" (Agape Guitar Version) – 5:44

== Personnel ==
- Florian Fricke – piano
- Daniel Fichelscher – guitar, percussion

Guest musicians

- Alois Gromer – sitar
- Mathias von Tippelskirch – flute

== Credits ==
Recorded at Bavaria Studios, Munich
Engineered by Hardy Bank, Frank Fiedler and Robert Wedel
Produced by Florian Fricke and Renate Knaup
