= Spirit of Peace =

Studio album by Popol Vuh
- Released: 1985
- Genre: New-age
- Length: 36:54
- Label: Spalax

Popol Vuh chronology
Agape – Agape (1983)	Spirit of Peace (1985)	Cobra Verde (1987)

Spirit of Peace is the 15th album by Popol Vuh. It was originally released in 1985 on Cicada. The first track was used by Werner Herzog in the soundtrack for his documentary film The Dark Glow of the Mountains (original German title Gasherbrum – Der leuchtende Berg) about Reinhold Messner.

== Track listing ==
All tracks composed by Florian Fricke except where noted.

1. "We Know About the Need" – 4:20
2. "Spirit of Peace" – 7:00
3. "Song of Earth" – 8:07
4. "Take the Tention High" (Fricke, Daniel Fichelscher) – 17:27

== Personnel ==
- Florian Fricke – piano, vocals
- Daniel Fichelscher – acoustic guitar
- Renate Knaup – vocals

Guest musicians

- Conny Veit – electric guitar
- Bernd Wippich – electric guitar

== Credits ==
Recorded at Quadrat Studio, Munich, March - June 1985
Recorded and mixed by Bernd Wippich
Produced by Florian Fricke and Popol Vuh

Cover concept by Florian Fricke
Cover design by Tormod Opedal and Erik Wollo

== Liner notes ==
Words:
Yehung
Hand in Hand
