= My Best Fiend =

- Theatrical release poster
- Directed by: Werner Herzog
- Written by: Werner Herzog
- Produced by: Lucki Stipetic
- Starring: Werner Herzog; Klaus Kinski (archive footage); Eva Mattes; Claudia Cardinale
- Narrated by: Werner Herzog
- Cinematography: Peter Zeitlinger
- Edited by: Joe Bini
- Music by: Popol Vuh
- Production companies: Werner Herzog Film Produktion; Cafe Productions; Zephir Film Produktion
- Distributed by: Zephir Film
- Release date: 7 October 1999
- Running time: 95 minutes
- Country: Germany
- Languages: German; English; Spanish

My Best Fiend (German: Mein liebster Feind - Klaus Kinski, literally My Dearest Foe - Klaus Kinski) is a 1999 German documentary film written and directed by Werner Herzog, about his tumultuous yet productive relationship with German actor Klaus Kinski. It was released on DVD in 2000 by Anchor Bay.

== Synopsis ==
The film opens with shots of Klaus Kinski performing, after his own interpretation, the role of Jesus. Kinski harangues the audience for not paying attention to him, curses wildly, has the microphone taken away from him, and, screaming, steals it back. This is the tour Kinski left to star in Herzog's film Aguirre, the Wrath of God (1972). This was the first of five films that the two would make together, the others being Nosferatu the Vampyre (1979); Woyzeck (1979); Fitzcarraldo (1982); and Cobra Verde (1987).

After this opening, Herzog tours a substantially renovated apartment that he and his family shared with Kinski and other boarders. Herzog then tours some of the countries he and Kinski filmed at. He looks at the first film clip he ever saw of Kinski and presents footage from the sets of their various movies. He recounts the heated and sometimes violent altercations between them, including the oft-repeated story of how he threatened to shoot Kinski should he leave the production of Aguirre. He also draws on footage from Burden of Dreams (1982), a documentary about the making of Fitzcarraldo, which was a particularly difficult film for their relationship.

At the same time, Herzog expresses deep respect for Kinski's acting talent. Interviews with two of the women who starred opposite him, Eva Mattes (from Woyzeck) and Claudia Cardinale (from Fitzcarraldo), suggest that the actor had a calmer side. Herzog also meets with Beat Presser, a photographer who has displayed many photos of Herzog and Kinski. One of these photos is used as the film's poster. The final sequence in the film shows Kinski playing with a butterfly in the Peruvian jungle.

Herzog describes Kinski's death as the result of having lived so strenuously and fully, describing him as "like a comet". His voice is heard over the final scene of Cobra Verde, in which Kinski collapses in the surf as he tries to pull a large boat out to sea.

== Critical reception ==
The documentary was screened out of competition at the 1999 Cannes Film Festival. It has an 80% approval rating on Rotten Tomatoes with an average rating of 7.00/10.

Janet Maslin of the New York Times called the film "[a] captivating documentary, a film that serves as an eloquent coda to their unforgettable creative partnership.". Roger Ebert gave the film three stars out of a possible four, saying:

As a meditation by a director on an actor, it is unique; most show-biz docs involve the ritual exchange of compliments. My Best Fiend is about two men who both wanted to be dominant, who both had all the answers, who were inseparably bound together in love and hate, and who created extraordinary work – while all the time each resented the other's contribution.

Jonathan Rosenbaum, writing for the Chicago Reader, was less enthusiastic, calling the film, "The art-movie equivalent to writer-director Blake Edwards's Trail of the Pink Panther:

Edwards and Peter Sellers reportedly were at each other’s throats throughout their many collaborations on Pink Panther comedies—largely, it appears, because of Sellers’s hyperbolically neurotic behavior. Herzog and Kinski had a similarly volatile relationship, which ended only after Kinski died, in 1991. Herzog got his revenge by releasing outtakes of his difficult star, much as Edwards continued to fiddle around with unreleased footage of Sellers as Inspector Clouseau in Trail of the Pink Panther. Herzog offers a personal documentary about Kinski and himself—recollecting particular tantrums and outrages while speculating on their significance, revisiting the Peruvian locations of some of their joint efforts, interviewing former crew members, showing Kinski behaving vilely to everyone around him.

== In popular culture ==
- "My Friend Falcon", a fake "behind the scenes" episode of American TV show Childrens Hospital depicts director David Wain's (as himself) contentious relationship with fictional cast member Just Falcon (played by Ken Marino), parodying several scenes of My Best Fiend. Over the course of the episode, it gets more and more obvious that Wain is responsible for many negative events in Falcon's life, is obsessed with him and is insane.
