= Nosferatu (disambiguation) =

Nosferatu is a 1922 German expressionist film.

Nosferatu may also refer to:

Nosferatu (word), a synonym for "vampire" first mentioned in English by Emily Gerard, largely popularized by Bram Stoker — whose gothic novel Dracula (1897) uses it twice.

== Film and television ==
- Nosferatu, a 1922 silent German expressionist film by F. W. Murnau.
  - Count Orlok, a vampire erroneously referred to as Nosferatu
- Nosferatu the Vampyre (original German title: Nosferatu: Phantom der Nacht), a 1979 horror film by Werner Herzog
- Nosferatu (2023 film), an independent shot-for-shot remake of the 1922 film
- Nosferatu (2024 film), a horror film by Robert Eggers
- NOS4A2 (TV series), an American television series

== Gaming ==
- Nosferatu the Vampyre (video game), a 1986 video game developed by Design Design
- Nosferatu: The Wrath of Malachi, a 2003 horror PC game
- Nosferatu (video game), a 1994 Super Nintendo Entertainment System game by Seta Corporation
- Nosferatu, a monster included in the 2000 video game Resident Evil – Code: Veronica
- CFA-44 Nosferatu, a fictional fighter in Ace Combat 6: Fires of Liberation
- Nosferatu, a vampire-type monster for the Ravenloft setting of Advanced Dungeons & Dragon 2nd Edition

== Music ==
- Nosferatu The Vampire (musical), a 1994 rock opera by Bernard J. Taylor
- Nosferatu (band), an English gothic rock band
- Nosferatu D2, an English indie rock band
- Nosferatu (Helstar album), 1989
- Nosferatu (Hugh Cornwell and Robert Williams album), 1979
- Nosferatu the Vampire, alternative title of Brüder des Schattens – Söhne des Lichts by Popol Vuh, 1978
- Nosferatu (Popol Vuh album), 1978
- Nosferatu (John Zorn album), 2012
- Nosferatu (Art Zoyd album), 1989
- Nosferatu, a 2005 album by Bloodbound
- "Nosferatu", a song by Blue Öyster Cult from Spectres
- Nosferatu (soundtrack), 2024
- "Brosferatu", a song from the soundtrack to Scary Movie.

== In print ==
- Batman: Nosferatu, a 1999 Elseworlds publication by DC Comics
- Nosferatu (graphic novel), 2010
- Nosferatu: Plague of Terror, a 1991–1992 comic series
- NOS4A2 (pronounced Nosferatu), a 2013 novel by Joe Hill
- Nosferatu Zodd, a character from the anime and manga Berserk

== Other uses ==
- Dracula: The Series, a character in the 1990-1991 multinational TV series
- Nosferatu (fish), a genus of cichlid fishes
- Nosferatu (wrestler) (born 1979), Mexican luchador enmascarado, or masked professional wrestler
- Nosferatu, a seasonal beer from the Great Lakes Brewing Company

== See also ==
- NOS-4-A2, a robotic vampire from the Buzz Lightyear of Star Command animated series
