= Nosferatu (Popol Vuh album) =

Soundtrack album by Popol Vuh
- Released: 1978
- Recorded: 1978
- Genre: Krautrock; new age
- Length: 45:06
- Label: Egg
- Producer: Gerhard Augustin

Popol Vuh chronology
Brüder des Schattens – Söhne des Lichts (1978)	Nosferatu (1978)	Die Nacht der Seele (1979)

Professional ratings
Review scores
Source	Rating
AllMusic	4/5 stars

Nosferatu is the eleventh album by Popol Vuh and was released by Egg in France as the original motion picture soundtrack of Nosferatu: Phantom der Nacht by director Werner Herzog. It was originally released in 1978 as On the Way to a Little Way. In 2004 SPV re-released the album with a slightly different track list and adding four tracks originally released on the Popol Vuh album Brüder des Schattens – Söhne des Lichts.

== Track listing ==
1. "Mantra" – 6:14
2. "Morning Sun Rays" – 3:20
3. "Venus Principle" – 4:39
4. "Mantra II" – 5:22
5. "Auf dem Weg - On the Way" - 3:20 (bonus track - only on vinyl reissue)
6. "On the Way" – 4:02
7. "Through Pain To Heaven" – 3:46
8. "To a Little Way" – 2:34
9. "Zwiesprache der Rohrflöte mit der Sängerin" – 3:20
10. "Die Nacht der Himmel" – 4:50
11. "Der Ruf der Rohrflöte" – 3:39

CD and vinyl reissues altered this track listing slightly.

== Personnel ==
- Florian Fricke – piano, Moog synthesizer
- Daniel Fichelscher – E-guitar, acoustic guitar, percussion

Guest musicians

- Robert Eliscu – oboe
- Alois Gromer – sitar
- Ted de Jong – tamboura
- A chorus from Munich

== Credits ==
Recorded at Bavaria Studio, Munich, August 1978
Produced by Gerhard Augustin

== Notes ==
Swedish progressive death metal band Opeth has been known to use "Through Pain to Heaven" as their entrance music for live concerts.
