= In den Gärten Pharaos =

Studio album by Popol Vuh
- Released: 1971
- Recorded: Trixi Studio, Munich, Germany; St. Margareta church, Baumburg (Altenmarkt), Southern Germany
- Genre: Electronic; new-age
- Length: 37:25
- Label: Pilz
- Producer: Popol Vuh; Bettina Fricke

Popol Vuh chronology
Affenstunde (1970)	In den Gärten Pharaos (1971)	Hosianna Mantra (1972)

In den Gärten Pharaos ("In Pharaoh's Gardens") is the second album by German band Popol Vuh, released in 1971 by record label Pilz.

== Content ==
On In den Gärten Pharaos, Florian Fricke made more extensive use of the Moog synthesizer and experimental electronic sounds.

On side A is the title track "In den Gärten Pharaos", an ancient, contemplative meditation with the sound of rippling water, Moog synthesizer, Fender Rhodes, and African percussion. The Moog creates an exotic and alien sound while the African percussion and the water effects are interwoven throughout bringing the listener back to earth. The track was recorded at Trixi Studio in Munich.

The second song "Vuh" is dominated by one massive organ chord creating an epic wall of sound. "Vuh" uses the wide range of the organ, both the low drones and the high crescendos. Turkish percussion and layers of cymbals increase the intensity of the music. The song was then played and recorded on a medieval cathedral organ in the St. Margareta church, Baumburg (Altenmarkt) in Southern Germany.

== Reception ==
Professional ratings
Review scores
Source	Rating
AllMusic	4/5 stars
Head Heritage	very favorable

Perfect Sound Forever described it as "an altogether more mature and unified work" than Affenstunde. Mark Lager described it as "the most mind-blowing mystical experience" and "awe-inspiring".

== Legacy ==
The album was ranked the 3rd greatest of the 1970s by FACT magazine.

== Track listing ==
All tracks are written by Popol Vuh.

Side A
No.	Title	Length
1.	"In den Gärten Pharaos"	17:38

Side B
No.	Title	Length
1.	"Vuh"	19:51

2004 CD Reissue Bonus Tracks:

Kha-White Structures 1 10:14

Kha-White Structures 2 10:09

== Personnel ==
- Florian Fricke – Moog synthesizer, Fender Rhodes, medieval cathedral organ
- Holger Trülzsch – African and Turkish percussion
- Frank Fiedler – Moog-Synthesizer-mixdown

Additional personnel

- Helmut Fritz – album cover
- Steffen Metzner – sleeve photography
