= Das Hohelied Salomos =

Studio album by Popol Vuh
- Released: 1975
- Recorded: February 1975
- Studio: Bavaria Tonstudio
- Genre: New-age
- Length: 33:12
- Label: United Artists
- Producer: Florian Fricke, Reinhard Langowski

Popol Vuh chronology
Einsjäger und Siebenjäger (1974)	Das Hohelied Salomos (1975)	Aguirre (1975)

Professional ratings
Review scores
Source	Rating
AllMusic	3.5/5 stars

Das Hohelied Salomos is the sixth album by Popol Vuh. The title refers to the biblical poem Song of Songs also known as Song of Solomon. The album was originally released in 1975, on United Artists Records. In 2005, SPV re-released the album with three bonus tracks.

== Track listing ==
All tracks composed by Florian Fricke except 2, 9 composed by Florian Fricke and Daniel Fichelscher, and 7 composed by Daniel Fichelscher. Lyrics by King Salomo (Solomon) arranged by Florian Fricke.

1. "Steh auf, zieh mich Dir nach" – 4:44
2. "Du schönste der Weiber" – 4:28
3. "In den Nächten auf den Gassen I" – 1:33
4. "Du Sohn Davids I" – 2:59
5. "In den Nächten auf den Gassen II" – 3:26
6. "Der Winter ist vorbei" – 3:42
7. "Ja, Deine Liebe ist süßer als Wein" – 3:36
8. "Du Sohn Davids II" – 3:47
9. "Du tränke mich mit Deinen Küssen" – 4:57

2005 bonus tracks

10. "In den Nächten auf den Gassen III" – 2:10
11. "Schön bist Du vor Menschensöhnen" (Alternative Session) – 2:45
12. "Mitten im Garten" (Alternative Piano Version) – 4:50

== Personnel ==
- Florian Fricke – piano
- Daniel Fichelscher – electric guitar, acoustic guitar, percussion
- Djong Yun – vocals

Guest musicians

- Alois Gromer – sitar
- Shana Kumar – tabla

== Credits ==
- Recorded at Bavaria Studio, Munich, February 1975
- Engineered by Klaus Meier and Wolfgang Loper, assisted by Libuse Tomas and Hardy Bank
- Electronics by Florian Fricke, Frank Fiedler, and Robert Wedel
- Mixed and produced by Florian Fricke and Reinhard Langowski
- Art direction and design by Ulli Eichberger
