= Shepherd's Symphony – Hirtensymphonie =

Shepherd's Symphony - Hirtensymphonie

Studio album by Popol Vuh
- Released: 1997

Popol Vuh chronology
City Raga (1995)	Shepherd's Symphony - Hirtensymphonie (1997)	Messa di Orfeo (1999)

2004 reissue cover

Shepherd's Symphony – Hirtensymphonie is the nineteenth album by Popol Vuh. It was originally released in 1997 on Mystic Records. In 2004 SPV re-released the album with a different cover (designed by Frank Fiedler). The 1995 semi-documentary Kailash – Pilgerfahrt zum Thron der Götter, directed by Popol Vuh member Frank Fiedler, includes several edited version of the tracks that would later be released on the album.

== Track listing ==
All tracks composed by Florian Fricke and Guido Hieronymus except where noted.

1. "Shepherds of the Future - Die Hirten der Zukunft" – 6:08
2. "Short Visit to the Great Sorcerer - Kurzer Besuch beim Großen Zauberer" – 6:02
3. "Wild Vine" – 8:29
4. "Shepherd's Dream - Der Traum des Schäfers" – 4:17
5. "Eternal Love" – 8:18
6. "Dance of the Menads - Tanz der Menaden" – 6:24
7. "YES" (Hieronymus) – 5:02

== Personnel ==
- Florian Fricke – piano
- Guido Hieronymus – keyboards, electric guitar
- Frank Fiedler – synthesizer

== Credits ==
Recorded at Afro Sounds Studio, Munich, September 1995 - March 1996
Engineered by Guido Hieronymus
Sound consultant: Johannes Fricke
Produced by Popol Vuh
Executive producer: Gerhard Augustin

Project co-ordination: Don McKay and Robert Barrs-James
