= Affenstunde =

Studio album by Popol Vuh
- Released: 1970
- Recorded: Bavaria Music Studio, Munich, West Germany
- Genres: Ambient; electronic
- Length: 40:02
- Label: Liberty
- Producers: Bettina Fricke, Gerhard Augustin

Popol Vuh chronology
Affenstunde (1970)	In den Gärten Pharaos (1971)

Affenstunde ("The Dawn of Man," or literally, "Hour of the Monkeys") is the first album by German band Popol Vuh. Originally released in 1970 in Germany by Liberty Records, it has been reissued several times by various international labels. The 2004 German SPV edition features one previously unreleased bonus track. It is a notable early example of the Moog synthesizer being used for the production and composition of original music.

== Reception ==
Professional ratings
Review scores
Source	Rating
AllMusic	3/5 stars

AllMusic called it "an auspicious debut, which holds up wonderfully in the 21st century." Perfect Sound Forever described Affenstunde as "a landmark electronic album" that "also doesn't have the timeless quality of many of their later works". Julian Cope described it as "a debut album of incredible sounds and sensations that were unlike anything prior to its existence". David Stubbs described the album as sounding "otherworldly, beguiling, perhaps precisely because of its 'datedness', its raw technological naïveté".

== Track listing ==
All tracks by Popol Vuh except track number 5 by Florian Fricke.

1. "Ich mache einen Spiegel – Dream Part 4" – 8:44
2. "Ich mache einen Spiegel – Dream Part 5" – 4:41
3. "Ich mache einen Spiegel – Dream Part 49" – 7:43
4. "Affenstunde" – 18:30

2004 bonus track

5. "Train Through Time" – 10:30

== Personnel ==
- Florian Fricke – Moog synthesizer
- Holger Trülzsch – percussion
- Frank Fiedler – Synthesizer mixdown
- Bettina Fricke – cover design, production, tablas (un-credited)
