= Sei still, wisse ich bin =

Sei still, wisse ICH BIN

Studio album by Popol Vuh
- Released: 1981
- Recorded: 1980–1981
- Genre: New-age
- Length: 34:15
- Label: Innovative Communication
- Producer: Klaus Schulze and Florian Fricke

Popol Vuh chronology
Die Nacht der Seele (1979)	Sei still, wisse ICH BIN (1981)	Agape – Agape (1983)

Professional ratings
Review scores
Source	Rating
AllMusic	4.5/5 stars
Sounds	5/5 stars

Sei still, wisse ICH BIN (subtitled "Szenische Gesänge") is the thirteenth album by Popol Vuh. It was originally released in 1981 on Klaus Schulze's record label Innovative Communication. In 2006 SPV re-released the album with one bonus track. "Wehe Khorazin", "Garten der Gemeinschaft", an extract of "Laß los" and "... als lebten die Engel auf Erden" were used in 1982 for the soundtrack of Werner Herzog's film Fitzcarraldo.

== Track listing ==
All tracks composed by Florian Fricke.

1. "Wehe Khorazin" – 6:22
2. "Und als ER sah es geht dem Ende zu" – 7:04
3. "Garten der Gemeinschaft" – 4:41
4. "Gemeinsam aßen sie das Brot" – 2:51
5. "Laß los" – 6:46
6. "Gemeinsam tranken sie den Wein" – 3:50
7. "...als lebten die Engel auf Erden" – 2:10

2006 bonus track

8. "King Minos III" (Studio Version) – 5:02

== Personnel ==
- Florian Fricke – piano, vocals
- Daniel Fichelscher – guitar, drums
- Renate Knaup – vocals

Guest musicians

- Chris Karrer – soprano saxophone
- Choir ensemble of the Bavarian State Opera

== Credits ==
Recorded at Bavaria Studio, Munich, 1981
Produced by Florian Fricke and IC – Klaus Schulze Productions
Track number 8 produced by Florian Fricke

Cover photography by Thomas Lindner
