= Nextera =

Czech record label

- Founded: 1989
- Founder: Kristian Kotarac
- Genre: Electronic ambient
- Country of origin: Czech Republic
- Location: Prague
- Official website: http://www.nextera.cz/

Nextera is an independent Czech record label, founded in Prague in 1989, specializing in dance, ambient and electronic music. It was founded by Kristian Kotarac. Kotarac died suddenly in 2013.

== Artists ==
- Clock DVA
- The Hafler Trio
- Colin Potter
- Lustmord
- Ohm Square
- Oöphoi
- Peter Namlok
- Steve Roach
- Klaus Wiese
- Sylvain Chauveau

== See also ==
- List of record labels
