= AFTS =

AFTS may refer to:

- Australian Fairy Tale Society, a society for exploring fairy tales through an Australian perspective
- Australian Film Television School, former name of Australian Film, Television and Radio School
- Autonomous flight termination system, a system in which flight termination can be commanded on a rocket without the involvement of ground personnel

== See also ==
- No. 1 AFTS (No. 1 Applied Flying Training School), former name of No. 1 Flying Training School RAAF
