= Louisa John-Krol =

Australian folk musician

Louis John-Krol
- Origin: Melbourne, Australia
- Genres: Folk\Pop
- Years active: 1996-2008
- Label: Hyperium Records

Louisa John-Krol is a Melbourne-based Australian artist of the romantic folk/pop genre - described as 'romantic pop-ethereal faerie' music by the artist herself and others. She has released six albums to date, originally on the German label, Hyperium Records, but in more recent years with the French label Prikosnovénie a.k.a. The Fairy World Label. She has also been involved in a number of collaborative projects with other artists, including two film soundtracks. Louisa is often compared to Loreena McKennitt and Kate Bush.

== Discography ==
Until 2008 her solo albums had all started with A:

- Argo (1996)
- Alexandria (2000)
- Ariel (2002)
- Alabaster (2003)
- Apple Pentacle (2005)
- Alexandria (re-release 2007)
- Djinn (2008)

Her collaborative work has included:

- Love Sessions (2002) with Daemonia Nymphe, Gor, & Lys
- Artemis Asphodel (2004) with Saaroth
- Spyros Giasafakis with Christian Wolz (of Daemonia Nymphe) (2004)
- Ghost Fish (2005) with Daemonia Nymphe and Nikodemos Triaridis
- Stella Maris (2005) with Alquimia & Kerstin Blodig
- Wintersilence with Mathias Grassow (2004)
- I Hear the Water Dreaming (2005) with Oöphoi & Mark Krol
- Destroying the World to Save It (2005) with Ikon

John-Krol's work has also been included in over a dozen compilations. All of her lyrics stem from fairy tales and literature generally. She is known to have worked as a story teller for many years, and is believed to currently also teach music and literature.

Louisa performed in Mons (Belgium) at the Trolls and Legendes concert.

In 2021 Louisa won the Australian Fairy Tale Society Award for her significant contribution to the field of fairy tales in Australia, including being AFTS President for many years.
