= Einsjäger und Siebenjäger =

Studio album by Popol Vuh
- Released: 1974
- Recorded: May 1974 Bavaria Studios, Munich
- Genre: Krautrock; progressive rock; psychedelic rock; space rock
- Length: 36:13
- Label: Kosmische Musik

Popol Vuh chronology
Seligpreisung (1973)	Einsjäger und Siebenjäger (1974)	Das Hohelied Salomos (1975)

Professional ratings
Review scores
Source	Rating
Allmusic	4.5/5 stars

Einsjäger und Siebenjäger is the fifth album by Popol Vuh. It was originally released in 1974 on Kosmische Musik. In 2004 SPV re-released the album with two bonus tracks. "Wo bist Du?" was originally released on Popol Vuh's album Die Nacht der Seele as "Wo bist Du, der Du überwunden hast?".

The album's title is a German translation of the names of two characters in the Popol Vuh, Hun-Hunahpu and Vucub-Hunahpu ("One-Hunter" and "Seven-Hunter").

== Track listing ==
All tracks composed by Florian Fricke except 1, 3 composed by Daniel Fichelscher. Lyrics by Salomo, revised by Florian Fricke.

1. "Kleiner Krieger" – 1:04
2. "King Minos" – 4:24
3. "Morgengruß" – 2:59
4. "Würfelspiel" – 3:08
5. "Gutes Land" – 5:13
6. "Einsjäger und Siebenjäger" – 19:23

2004 bonus tracks

7. "King Minos II" – 1:55
8. "Wo bist Du?" – 5:42

== Personnel ==
- Florian Fricke – piano, spinett
- Daniel Fichelscher – electric guitar, 12-string guitar, percussion
- Djong Yun – vocals

Guest musicians

- Olaf Kübler – flute (on 4)

== Credits ==
Recorded at Bavaria Studios, Munich, May 1974
Engineered by H. Meier
Mixed & produced by Popol Vuh for Cosmic Couriers

Cover design by Peter Geitner
Photography by Bettina Fricke
