= Cobra Verde (soundtrack) =

Soundtrack album by Popol Vuh
- Released: 1987
- Genre: New-age
- Length: 39:30
- Label: SPV U.S.

Popol Vuh chronology
Spirit of Peace (1985)	Cobra Verde (1987)	For You and Me (1991)

Professional ratings
Review scores
Source	Rating
Allmusic	2.5/5 stars

Cobra Verde is the sixteenth album by Popol Vuh. It was originally released in 1987 on Milan Records as the original motion picture soundtrack of Werner Herzog's Cobra Verde with Klaus Kinski. In 2006 SPV re-released the album with one bonus track (recorded during the sessions for the 1991 Popol Vuh album For You and Me).

== Track listing ==
All tracks composed by Florian Fricke except where noted.

1. "Der Tod des Cobra Verde" – 4:35
2. "Nachts: Schnee" – 1:51
3. "Der Marktplatz" – 2:30
4. "Eine andere Welt" – 5:07
5. "Grab der Mutter" – 4:30
6. "Die singenden Mädchen von Ho, Ziavi" (Zigi Cultural Troupe Ho, Ziavi) – 6:52
7. "Sieh nicht überm Meer ist's" – 1:26
8. "Hab Mut, bis daß die Nacht mit Ruh' und Stille kommt" – 9:32

2006 bonus track

9. "OM Mani Padme Hum 4" (Piano Version) – 5:28

== Personnel ==
- Florian Fricke – piano, synclavier, vocals
- Daniel Fichelscher – guitar, percussion, vocals
- Renate Knaup – vocals

Guest musicians

- Kristen Ritter – vocals (on 1)
- Irmgard Hecker – vocals (on 7)
- Choir of the Bavarian State Opera

Synclavier programming, recording and digital mastering by Ralph Graf
Track number 6 performed with the singing girls of the Zigi Cultural Troupe Ho, Ziavi

== Credits ==
Recorded at Union Studios, Munich, September 1987
Track number 9 recorded at New African Studio, Munich and Sound Fabrik, Munich, January - April 1991
Produced by Florian Fricke
Track number 9 produced by Florian Fricke and Frank Fiedler
