= For You and Me =

Studio album by Popol Vuh
- Released: 1991
- Recorded: January–April 1991
- Studio: New African Studio; Sound Fabrik (both Munich)
- Genre: Krautrock
- Label: Milan
- Producer: Popol Vuh

Popol Vuh chronology
Cobra Verde (1987)	For You and Me (1991)	City Raga (1995)

Professional ratings
Review scores
Source	Rating
Allmusic	3/5 stars

For You and Me is the seventeenth album by Popol Vuh. It was originally released in 1991 on Milan Records. In 2006 SPV re-released the album with one bonus track.

== Track listing ==
- All tracks composed by Florian Fricke except where noted.
1. "For You and Me" – 5:24
2. "Wind of the Stars in Their Eyes" (Anne-Marie O'Farell) – 3:03
3. "Little Bazaari" – 7:48
4. "Compassion" – 5:57
5. "When Love Is Calling You" (Fricke, Daniel Fichelscher) – 4:11
6. "In Your Eyes" (Guido Hieronymus) – 0:55
7. "OM Mani Padme Hum 1" (Fricke, Hieronymus) – 1:09
8. "OM Mani Padme Hum 2" – 2:45
9. "OM Mani Padme Hum 3" – 4:30
10. "OM Mani Padme Hum 4" – 5:17
11. "For You" – 2:02

2006 bonus track

12. "OM Mani Padme Hum 3" (Piano Version) – 4:31

"When Love Is Calling You" is a new version of "Letzte Tage - Letzte Nächte" from the album Letzte Tage – Letzte Nächte (1976)

== Personnel ==
=== Popol Vuh ===
- Florian Fricke: piano
- Daniel Fichelscher: guitar
- Renate Knaup: vocals

=== Additional Personnel ===
- Guido Hieronymus: keyboards, guitar
- Anne-Marie O'Farell: Irish harp (on 2)

== Credits ==
Recorded at New African Studio, Munich & Sound Fabrik, Munich, January - April 1991
Arranged by Guido Hieronymus and Popol Vuh
Produced by Popol Vuh for Milan Records
Executive producers: Florian Fricke and Frank Fiedler

Executive direction by Emmanuel Chamboredon and Toby Pieniek
Art direction by Judy Kaganowich
Package supervision by Dana Renert
