= Messa di Orfeo =

Messa de Orfeo

Live album by Popol Vuh
- Released: 1999
- Recorded: 1998
- Label: Spalax Music
- Producer: Popol Vuh and Time Zones

Popol Vuh chronology
| Shepherd's Symphony – Hirtensymphonie (1997) | Messa de Orfeo (1999) |

Messa di Orfeo is the twentieth and last album by Popol Vuh. It was originally released in 1999 on Spalax and features music played during an audio-video-light installation as performed in the Labyrinth of Molfetta, Bari, during the Time Zones Festival in 1998.

== Track listing ==
All tracks composed by Florian Fricke.

1. "Deep in the Ocean of Love" – 2:50
2. "Strofa 1" – 3:37
3. "Nascita dell' ape" – 7:18
4. "Strofa 2" – 3:45
5. "Dall' origine al divenire" – 2:15
6. "Strofa 3" – 4:05
7. "Strofa 4" – 3:49
8. "Primo movimento" – 13:41
9. "Strofa 5" – 3:48

== Personnel ==
- Florian Fricke – keyboards
- Frank Fiedler – video
- Guillermina De Gennaro – recitation
- Maya Rose – vocals
- Johannes Fricke – artist assistance

== Credits ==
Live recording by Popol Vuh
Studio recording at Tom Tom-Studio, Bari, Italy
Produced by Popol Vuh and Time Zones

== Liner notes ==
The liner notes of the album are in Italian.

Original text in Italian

Orfeo, il bardo, fa parte degli argonauti
Oiagros, dio del fiume, suo padre
Calliope, la musa, sua madre
I suoi emblemi sono l'ape e la cicala, animali divini, amici delle muse

Translation in English

Orpheus, the bard, part of the Argonauts
Oeagrus, god of the river, his father
Calliope, the Muse, his mother
His emblems are the bee and the grasshopper, divine animals, friends of the Muses

== Lyrics ==
Original in Italian

La terra ed io siamo uno
i suoi occhi ed i miei occhi sono uno
le sue orecchie e le mie orecchie sono uno

La terra ed io siamo uno
le sue ossa e le mie ossa sono uno

La terra ed io siamo uno
la sua carne e la mia carne sono uno

La terra ed io siamo uno
il suo sangue ed il mio sangue sono uno

La terra ed io siamo uno
il suo respiro ed il mio respiro sono uno
La terra mi tiene e mi ama da sempre

Translation in English

The Earth and I are one
His eyes and my eyes are one
His ears and my ears are one

The Earth and I are one
His bones and my bones are one

The Earth and I are one
His flesh and my flesh are one

The Earth and I are one
His blood and my blood are one

The Earth and I are one
His breath and my breath are one
The Earth always holds me and loves me
