= Fitzcarraldo =

1982 film by Werner Herzog

- German release poster
- Directed by: Werner Herzog
- Written by: Werner Herzog
- Produced by: Werner Herzog; Willi Segler; Lucki Stipetić
- Starring: Klaus Kinski; Claudia Cardinale; José Lewgoy; Miguel Ángel Fuentes; Paul Hittscher; Huerequeque Enrique Bohórquez; Grande Otelo; Peter Berling
- Cinematography: Thomas Mauch
- Edited by: Beate Mainka-Jellinghaus
- Music by: Popol Vuh
- Production companies: Werner Herzog Filmproduktion; Pro-ject Filmproduktion; Filmverlag der Autoren; ZDF; Wildlife Films Peru S.A.
- Distributed by: Filmverlag der Autoren (West Germany)
- Release date: 5 March 1982 (West Germany)
- Running time: 157 minutes
- Countries: West Germany; Peru
- Languages: English; German (Note: Filmed in English, later dubbed into German.)
- Budget: DM 14 million

Fitzcarraldo (/fɪtskəˈrældoʊ/) is a 1982 epic adventure-drama film written, produced, and directed by Werner Herzog. The film stars Klaus Kinski as Brian Sweeney Fitzgerald, an Irish would-be rubber baron known in Peru as "Fitzcarraldo", who is determined to transport a steamship over a mountain in the Amazon rainforest and thereby access a rich rubber territory, with the ultimate goal of using the wealth to build an opera house in the area. The character was inspired by Peruvian rubber baron Carlos Fitzcarrald, who once had a disassembled steamboat transported over the Isthmus of Fitzcarrald by natives.

The film had a troubled production, chronicled in the documentary by Les Blank Burden of Dreams (1982). Herzog had his crew attempt to manually haul the 320-ton steamship up a steep hill, made difficult by mud and faulty mechanical parts. Native extras clashed with the filming environment and distrusted Herzog, while also suffering three injuries during tribal tensions. The film's original star Jason Robards became sick halfway through filming, so Herzog hired Kinski, with whom he had previously clashed violently during production of Aguirre, the Wrath of God (1972), Nosferatu the Vampyre (1979), and Woyzeck (1979). Their fourth collaboration fared no better. When shooting was nearly complete, the chief of the Machiguenga tribe, whose members were used extensively as extras, asked Herzog if they should kill Kinski for him, though Herzog declined.

At the 1982 Cannes Film Festival, Herzog won the Best Director Award and the film was nominated for the Palme d'Or. Fitzcarraldo received widespread positive reviews from critics, with Roger Ebert describing it as "imperfect, but transcendent".

== Plot ==
In the early part of the 20th century, Iquitos, Peru, a small city on the Upper Amazon, is experiencing rapid growth due to a rubber boom. One incomer, an Irishman named Brian Sweeney Fitzgerald (known locally as "Fitzcarraldo"), is a lover of opera and a great fan of the internationally renowned Italian tenor Enrico Caruso. He dreams of building an opera house in Iquitos, but, although he has an indomitable spirit, he has little capital. The Peruvian government has parceled up the areas in the Amazon basin known to contain rubber trees. However, the best parcels having already been leased to private companies for exploitation, Fitzcarraldo has been trying and failing to make the money to bring opera to Iquitos by various other means, including an ambitious attempt to construct a Trans-Andean Railway.

A rubber baron shows Fitzcarraldo a map and explains that, while the only remaining unclaimed parcel in the area is on the Ucayali River, a major tributary of the Amazon, it is cut off from the Amazon (and access to Atlantic ports) by a lengthy section of rapids. Fitzcarraldo notices that the Pachitea River, another Amazon tributary, comes within several hundred meters of the Ucayali upstream of the parcel. (Note: This is fictional. The Pachitea is a tributary of the Ucayali, not a third river, and their confluence is nearly 500 kilometers south of Iquitos. The true map looks nothing like the one Fitzcarraldo draws.) He leases the inaccessible parcel from the government, and his paramour, Molly, a successful brothel owner, funds his purchase of an old steamship, which he christens the SS Molly Aida, from the rubber baron. After fixing up the boat, Fitzcarraldo recruits a crew and takes off up the Pachitea, which is largely unexplored because of the hostile Indians who live on its banks.

Fitzcarraldo intends to go to the closest point between the Pachitea and the Ucayali, pull his three-deck, 320-ton steamship up the muddy 40° hillside, and portage it from one river to the next. He plans to use the ship to collect rubber harvested along the Ucayali and then transport the rubber over to the Pachitea and, on different ships, down to market at Atlantic ports.

Soon after they enter Indian territory, the majority of Fitzcarraldo's crew, who are unaware of his full plan, abandon the expedition, leaving only the captain, engineer, and cook. The natives are impressed by the steamship and, once they make contact, agree to help Fitzcarraldo without asking many questions. After months of work and great struggles, they successfully pull the ship over the mountain using a complex system of pulleys aided by the ship's anchor windlass. The crew falls asleep after a drunken celebration, and the chief of the natives severs the rope securing the ship to the shore. Fitzcarraldo awakens as the boat is entering the rapids, and is unable to stop it. The ship does not sustain any major damage, but Fitzcarraldo is forced to abandon his quest. Before returning to Iquitos, he learns that the natives helped him move the ship in the belief that sending it over the Ucayali rapids would appease the spirits dwelling there.

Despondent, Fitzcarraldo sells the steamship back to the rubber baron, but there is time before the title changes hands for him to send for a European opera company that he is told is in Manaus. Lacking an opera house, they construct their sets on the deck of the ship, and the entire city of Iquitos comes down to the riverbank to watch as Fitzcarraldo floats it by, managing to bring opera to the city after all.

== Cast ==
- Klaus Kinski as Brian Sweeney "Fitzcarraldo" Fitzgerald
- Claudia Cardinale as Molly
- José Lewgoy as Don Aquilino
- Miguel Ángel Fuentes as Cholo
- Paul Hittscher as Captain "Orinoco" Paul Resenbrink
- Huerequeque Enrique Bohórquez as Huerequeque
- Grande Othelo as the stationmaster
- Peter Berling as the opera manager in Manaus
- David Pérez Espinosa as the Campa chief
- Milton Nascimento as the doorman at the opera house in Manaus
- Ruy Polanah as a rubber baron
- Salvador Godínez as the old missionary
- Dieter Milz as the young missionary
- Bill Rose as the notary
- Leôncio Bueno as the jailer
- Costante Moret as Enrico Caruso
- Jean-Claude Dreyfus as an opera singer

== Production ==
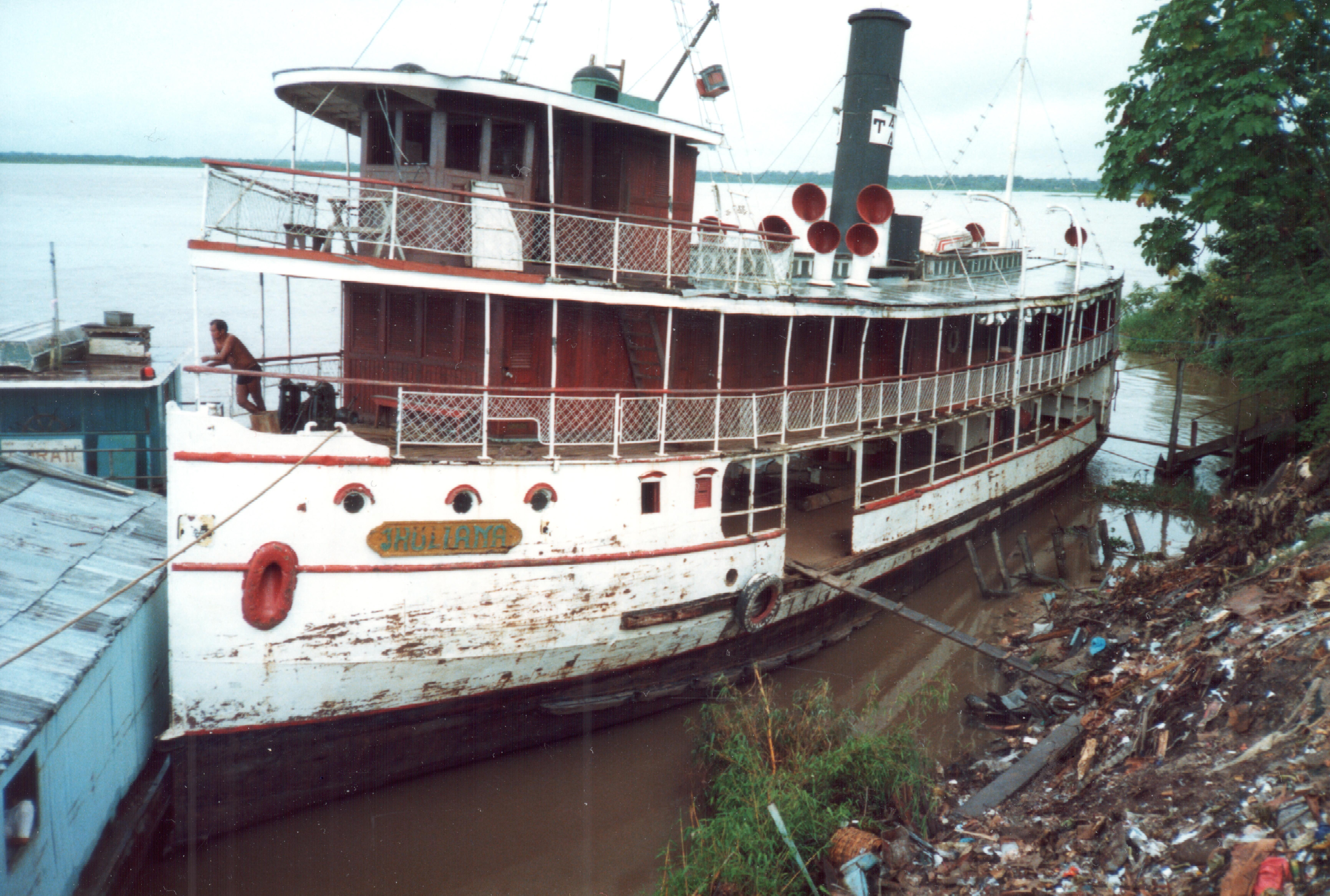
One of the river boats used in the shooting of Fitzcarraldo, in Iquitos in 1987

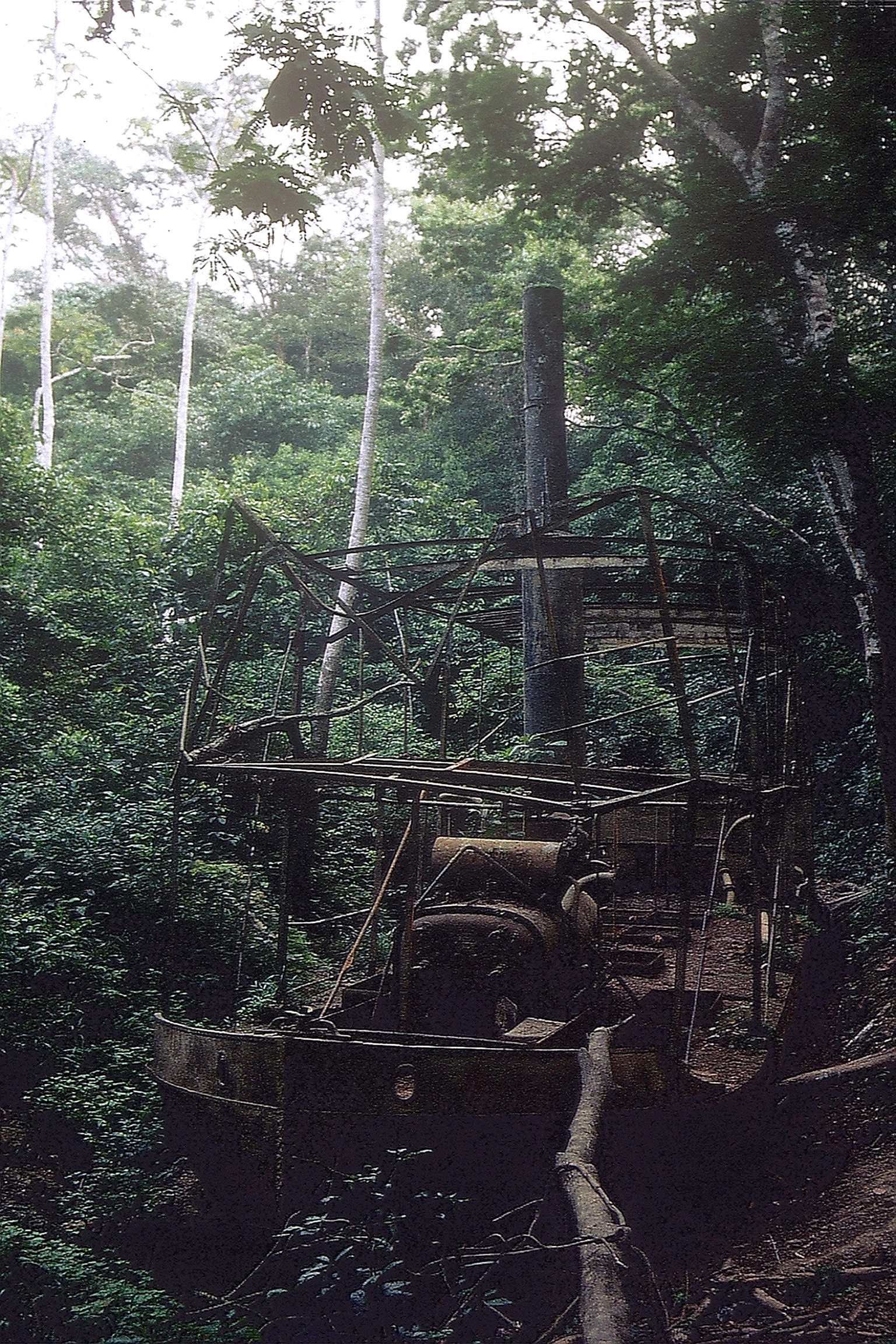
The remains of the prop boat left over from the film, in Madre de Dios Region. Photo: Dr. Eugen Lehle

Fitzcarraldo is considered one of the most difficult productions in the history of cinema.

The story was inspired by the historical figure of Peruvian rubber baron Carlos Fermín Fitzcarrald. In the 1890s, Fitzcarrald arranged for the transport of a steamship across an isthmus from one river into another, but it weighed only 30 tons (rather than over 300), and was carried over in pieces to be reassembled at its destination.

In his autobiographical film Portrait Werner Herzog (1986), Herzog said that he concentrated in Fitzcarraldo on the physical effort of transporting the ship, partly inspired by the engineering feats of ancient standing stones. The film production was an incredible ordeal, and famously involved moving a 320-ton steamship over a hill. This was filmed without the use of special effects. Herzog believed that no one had ever performed a similar feat in history, and likely never will again, calling himself "Conquistador of the Useless". Two similar-looking ships were bought for the production and used in different scenes and locations, including scenes that were shot aboard the ship while it crashed through rapids. The most violent scenes in the rapids were shot with a model of the ship.

Jason Robards was originally cast in the title role, but he became ill with dysentery after completing forty percent of the film and was subsequently forbidden by his doctors to return to Peru to finish. Herzog considered replacing Robards with Jack Nicholson, or playing Fitzcarraldo himself, before Klaus Kinski, with whom Herzog had worked on three previous films, accepted the role. Due to the delay in production, Mario Adorf was no longer available to play the role of the ship's captain, which was recast, and Mick Jagger had to leave to tour with the Rolling Stones, so Herzog wrote the character of Fitzcarraldo's assistant Wilbur out of the script.

Kinski displayed erratic behavior throughout the production and fought virulently with Herzog and other members of the crew. A scene from Herzog's documentary about the actor, My Best Fiend (1999), shows Kinski raging at production manager Walter Saxer over such matters as the quality of the food. Herzog has noted that the native extras were greatly upset by the actor's behavior, while Kinski claimed to feel close to them. In My Best Fiend, Herzog says that one of the native chiefs offered, in all seriousness, to kill Kinski for him, but that he declined because he needed the actor to complete filming. According to Herzog, he exploited these tensions. For example, in a scene in which the ship's crew is eating dinner while surrounded by the natives, the clamor the chief incites over Fitzcarraldo was inspired by actual hatred of Kinski.

Locations used in the film include: Manaus, Brazil; Iquitos, Peru; Pongo de Mainique, Peru; and an isthmus between the Urubamba and Camisea rivers in Peru (at 11° 44′ 18″ S, 72° 56′ 12″ W, 36 miles west of the actual Isthmus of Fitzcarrald).

Herzog's first version of the story was published as Fitzcarraldo: The Original Story (1982) by Fjord Press (ISBN 0-940242-04-4). He made alterations while writing the screenplay.

=== Injuries and accusations of exploitation ===
There were numerous accusations against the production, especially regarding Indigenous people being injured and killed. While there were some injuries during the shooting, none of them were directly related to the production, according to Herzog in the book Werner Herzog – A Guide for the Perplexed: Conversations with Paul Cronin. In the movie, one can see Indigenous workers seemingly getting trapped under the ship while hauling it over the hillside, apparently with fatal consequences. However, in the documentary about the film's production, one can see these persons jumping up laughing after shooting the scene. Two small plane crashes occurred during the film's production, which resulted in a number of injuries, including one case of paralysis. Another incident involved a local Peruvian logger who, after being bitten by a venomous snake, amputated his own foot with a chainsaw so as to prevent the spread of the venom, thus saving his own life.

Herzog has been accused of exploiting Indigenous people during the making of the film, and comparisons have been made between Herzog and Fitzcarraldo himself. In 1982, Michael F. Brown, now a professor of anthropology at Williams College, claimed in the magazine The Progressive that, while Herzog originally got along with the Aguaruna people, some of whom were hired as extras and laborers, relations deteriorated when Herzog began the construction of a village on Aguaruna land. He allegedly failed to consult the tribal council and attempted to obtain protection from the local militia when the tribe turned violent. Aguaruna men burned down the film set in December 1979, reportedly careful to avoid casualties, and it took Herzog many months to find another suitable location. The rumors and accusations eventually made Herzog so exhausted that he contacted Amnesty International to invite them to examine the conditions for the Indigenous people during the production. According to the conversations with Paul Cronin, the Amnesty report found no evidence of exploitation or bad conditions for the Indigenous workers.

== Music ==
The soundtrack album (released in 1982) contains music by Popol Vuh, taken from the albums Die Nacht der Seele (1979) and Sei still, wisse ich bin (1981), as well as performances by Enrico Caruso and others. The film uses excerpts from Verdi's Ernani, Leoncavallo's Pagliacci ("Ridi, Pagliaccio"), Puccini's La bohème, Bellini's I puritani, and Strauss' Death and Transfiguration.

== Reception ==
Film critic Roger Ebert gave the film four (out of four) stars in his original 1982 review, and he added it to his Great Movies collection in 2005. Ebert compared Fitzcarraldo to films like Apocalypse Now (1979) and 2001: A Space Odyssey (1968), noting that "we are always aware both of the film, and of the making of the film", and concluding that "[t]he movie is imperfect, but transcendent".

Writing for The New Yorker, Pauline Kael was critical of the film saying: "After a visually promising beginning, Herzog seems to lose interest in the external world. The shots are repetitive and are held too long, and though they're lovely, they don't have the ghostly, kinky expressiveness of the great images that sustain one through the dragginess."

Vincent Canby of The New York Times called it "a fine, quirky, fascinating movie" and a "stunning spectacle".

Japanese filmmaker Akira Kurosawa cited Fitzcarraldo as one of his favorite films.

On the review aggregator website Rotten Tomatoes, 78% of 32 critics' reviews are positive, with an average rating of 7.9/10. The website's consensus reads: "With a production as audacious as the feat it's depicting, Fitzcarraldo comes by its awe-inspiring spectacle honestly, even when it declines to examine the darker implications of its hero's dream."

=== Awards and honors ===
Fitzcarraldo won the 1982 German Film Prize in Silver for Best Feature Film. It was nominated for the BAFTA Award for Best Foreign Film, the Palme d'Or award of the Cannes Film Festival, and the Golden Globe Award for Best Foreign Language Film. Herzog won the award for Best Director at the 1982 Cannes Film Festival. The film was selected as the West German entry for Best Foreign Language Film at the 55th Academy Awards, but did not make the final shortlist of five nominees.

== Related works ==
Les Blank's documentary Burden of Dreams (1982), filmed during the production of Fitzcarraldo, documents its many hardships. Blank's work contains some of the only surviving footage of Robards' and Jagger's performances in the early filming of Fitzcarraldo. Herzog later used portions of this work in his documentaries: Portrait Werner Herzog (1986) and My Best Fiend (1999). Burden of Dreams has many scenes documenting the arduous transport of the ship over the mountain.

Herzog's personal diaries from the production were published in 2004 as the book Conquest of the Useless. The book includes an epilogue with Herzog's views on the Peruvian jungle 20 years later.

== In popular culture ==
In her 1983 parody "From the Diary of Werner Herzog" in The Boston Phoenix, Cathleen Schine describes the history of a fictitious film, Fritz: Commuter, as "a nightmarish tale of a German businessman obsessed with bringing professional hockey to Westport, Connecticut".

Glen Hansard wrote a song entitled "Fitzcarraldo", which appears on The Frames' 1995 album of the same name. On their live album Set List, Hansard says that Herzog's film inspired this song.

The film is referred to in The Simpsons episode "On a Clear Day I Can't See My Sister" (2005), in which the students are forced to pull their bus up a mountain. Üter complains, "I feel like I'm Fitzcarraldo!", and Nelson replies, "That movie was flawed!", punching Üter in the stomach. The title of a later episode of the series, "Fatzcarraldo" (2017), references the title of the film and also parodies aspects of its plot.

The Season 2 episode of Metalocalypse "Dethcarraldo" references the film. In this episode, the band Dethklok, after seeing a documentary on television about a South American tribe known as the Yaneemango (which happens to make up a quarter of frontman Nathan Explosion’s heritage), become interested in the tribe’s culture and plan an excursion to the Amazon jungle. During their journey through the jungle, they realise that the river has become too narrow for their Dethboat, so Nathan orders the Klokateers to pull the boat over a mountain.

In 2009, psychedelic rock band Hopewell released their album Good Good Desperation with the final track "Over The Mountain", which summarizes the plot of Fitzcaraldo.

== See also ==
- List of submissions to the 55th Academy Awards for Best Foreign Language Film
- List of German submissions for the Academy Award for Best Foreign Language Film
- List of cult films
- Carlos Fitzcarrald
- Isthmus of Fitzcarrald
