= Letzte Tage – Letzte Nächte =

Letzte Tage - Letzte Nächte

Studio album by Popol Vuh
- Released: 1976
- Genre: Krautrock; psychedelic rock
- Length: 30:19
- Label: United Artists

Popol Vuh chronology
Aguirre (1975)	Letzte Tage - Letzte Nächte (1976)	Herz aus Glas (1977)

Professional ratings
Review scores
Source	Rating
AllMusic	3.5/5 stars

Letzte Tage – Letzte Nächte (Last Days – Last Nights in German language) is the eighth album by Popol Vuh. It was originally released in 1976 on United Artists Records. In 2005 SPV re-released the album with three bonus tracks.

== Track listing ==
All tracks composed by Florian Fricke except track number 1 composed by Daniel Fichelscher, and tracks 7, 8, and 9 composed by Florian Fricke and Daniel Fichelscher.

1. "Der Große Krieger" – 3:10
2. "Oh, wie nah ist der Weg hinab" – 4:34
3. "Oh, wie weit ist der Weg hinauf" – 4:33
4. "In Deine Hände" – 3:01
5. "Kyrie" – 4:34
6. "Haram Dei Raram Dei Haram Dei Ra" – 1:27
7. "Dort ist der Weg" – 4:29
8. "Letzte Tage – Letzte Nächte" – 4:20

2005 bonus tracks

9. "Wanderschaft – Wanderings" – 5:56
10. "Gib hin" (Session Version) – 2:30
11. "Haram Dei Ra" (Alternative Version) – 6:32

"Letzte Tage – Letzte Nächte" was later updated as "When Love Is Calling You" on the 1991 album For You and Me.

== Personnel ==
- Florian Fricke – piano
- Daniel Fichelscher – guitar, percussion
- Djong Yun – vocals
- Renate Knaup – vocals

Guest musicians

- Alois Gromer – sitar
- Ted de Jong – tamboura

== Credits ==
Produced by Popol Vuh
