= Portrait Werner Herzog =

- Herzog with Lotte Eisner in Portrait Werner Herzog
- Directed by: Werner Herzog
- Written by: Werner Herzog
- Produced by: Lucki Stipetic
- Starring: Werner Herzog; Reinhold Messner; Lotte Eisner
- Narrated by: Werner Herzog
- Cinematography: Jörg Schmidt-Reitwein
- Edited by: Maximiliane Mainka
- Release date: 1986
- Running time: 28 minutes
- Country: West Germany
- Languages: German; English

Portrait Werner Herzog (German: Werner Herzog - Filmemacher) is an autobiographical short film by Werner Herzog made in 1986. Herzog tells stories about his life and career.

The film contains excerpts and commentary on several Herzog films, including Signs of Life, Heart of Glass, Fata Morgana, Aguirre, the Wrath of God, The Great Ecstasy of Woodcarver Steiner, Fitzcarraldo, La Soufrière, and the Les Blank documentary Burden of Dreams.

The film is notable for footage of a conversation between Herzog and Lotte Eisner, a film historian whom Herzog admired. In another section, he talks with mountaineer Reinhold Messner, during which they discuss a potential film project in the Himalayas to star Klaus Kinski.
