= Oöphoi =

Italian ambient musician

- Born: Gianluigi Gasparetti; March 26, 1958
- Origin: Rome, Italy
- Died: April 12, 2013 (aged 55) Terni, Italy
- Genres: Dark ambient, drone, experimental, minimal
- Occupation: Musician
- Instruments: synthesizers and samplers
- Years active: 1995–2013
- Labels: Due Acque, Hypnos, Nextera, Umbra, Penumbra, Arya/Amplexus

Gianluigi Gasparetti (26 March 1958 – 12 April 2013), known by the pseudonym Oöphoi, was an Italian ambient musician. He is perhaps best known for his role as the editor of Deep Listenings, an Italian magazine dedicated to ambient and deep atmospheric music, where he has featured interviews with many famous ambient artists including Steve Roach and Michael Stearns. Oöphoi's music can be characterized as being static, organic and minimalistic. It has an overall solid and monolithic feel to it, often integrated in a meditative and spiritual context. Created by using synths, singing bowls, flutes, and processed voices, his recordings have relatively slight harmonic variations. Gianluigi Gasparetti died in 2013 after a long illness.

== Discography ==
=== Solo works ===
- 1996 Static Soundscapes: Three Lights at the End of the World (Hic Sunt Leones)
- 1998 Behind The Wall of Sleep (Due Acque)
- 1998 Night Currents (Due Acque)
- 1998 The Spirals of Time (Aurora)
- 2000 Mare Vaporum (Due Acque)
- 2001 Mare Tranquillitatis (Due Acque)
- 2002 Athlit (Hypnos Recordings)
- 2002 Bardo (Electroshock Records)
- 2003 Mare Imbrium (Nextera)
- 2003 The Dreams of Shells (Mystery Sea)
- 2003 The Rustling of Leaves (Due Acque)
- 2004 Dreams (Umbra)
- 2005 As We Slip Away to Dream (Penumbra)
- 2005 Awakening The Nagas (Penumbra)
- 2005 Hymns to a Silent Sky (Nextera)
- 2005 Khumba Mela 2005, (Penumbra)
- 2005 Signals from the Great Beyond (Gears Of Sand)
- 2005 The Sun is Falling in a Sea Of Blood (Penumbra)
- 2005 Vertigo (Penumbra)
- 2006 Amnios (Umbra)
- 2006 Aquos—the Complete Drones (Umbra)
- 2006 Dreams Part One (Faria Records)
- 2006 Dreams Part Two (Faria Records)
- 2006 Dreams Part Three (Faria Records)
- 2007 Arpe Di Sabbia (Nextera)
- 2008 An Aerial View (Glacial Movements Records)
- 2008 Potala (Substantia Innominata)

=== Collaborations ===
with Mathias Grassow and Amir Baghiri

- 1999 Upuaut (Due Acque)

with Klaus Wiese

- 1999 Wouivre (Aurora)
- 2005 A Call, An Echo (Penumbra)
- 2005 The Light Sweeps All The Mist Away (Penumbra)
- 2006 Cherua (Umbra)
- 2006 Deva Mela (Penumbra)

with Tau Ceti

- 2001 Celestial Geometries (Arya)
- 2003 Subterranea (Nextera)
- 2004 Archaic Oceans (Umbra)
- 2005 Le Torri Del Silenzio (Penumbra)
- 2005 Lifting The Veil (Penumbra)
- 2006 Algol (Penumbra)
- 2006 Australis (Penumbra)
- 2006 Borealis (Penumbra)

with Louisa John-Krol

- 2005 I Hear The Water Dreaming (Prikosnovénie)

with L.E.M.

- 2005 Leteph (Penumbra)
- 2005 The Sacred Orbit (Umbra)
- 2006 Aludra (Penumbra)
- 2006 Substrata (Penumbra)
- 2006 The Gates Of Aldebaran (Penumbra)
- 2006 Trifida (Penumbra)

with Netherworld

- 2005 Postcards From The Void (Penumbra)

with Perceptual Defence

- 2005 Where The Green Ants Dream (Penumbra)

with Paul Vnuk Jr.

- 2006 Distance To Zero (Hypnos)

with Paradin

- 2006 Nocturnes (Umbra)

with Faryus

- 2007 Forgotten Rituals (Faria Records)

with Enrico Coniglio as AQUA DORSA

- 2009 Cloudlands (Glacial Movements)
- 2013 The November Earth (gterma)

with Seren Ffordd

- 2011 The Martian Chronicles (Hypnos)

=== Compilations ===
- 2001 Time Fragments Vol. 1 - The Archives 1995/1997 (Due Acque)
- 2001 Time Fragments Vol. 2 - The Archives 1998/1999 (Due Acque)
- 2001 Time Fragments Vol. 3 - The Archives 1999/2000 (Due Acque)
- 2004 Dust In The Wind - The Works, 1995 - 2003 (Umbra)
- 2005 Time Fragments Vol. 4 - Garden Of Earthly Delights (Umbra)
- 2005 Time Fragments Vol. 5 - Wastelands (Umbra)
- 2005 Time Fragments Vol. 6 - Between Nothingness And Eternity (Umbra)
- 2006 EP Collection Vol. 1 (Penumbra)
- 2006 EP Collection Vol. 2 (Penumbra)
- 2006 EP Collection Vol. 3 (Penumbra)
- 2006 EP Collection Vol. 4 (Penumbra)
- 2006 EP Collection Vol. 5 (Penumbra)
- 2006 EP Collection Vol. 6 (Penumbra)
- 2006 EP Collection Vol. 7 (Penumbra)
- 2006 EP Collection Vol. 8 (Penumbra)
- 2006 EP Collection Vol. 9 (Penumbra)
- 2007 Whispers From The Noisy Void (Umbra)
