= Lotte H. Eisner =

German historian

- Born: Lotte Henriette Regina Eisner; 5 March 1896; Berlin, German Empire (present-day Berlin, Germany)
- Died: 25 November 1983 (aged 87); Paris, France
- Education: University of Rostock (PhD)
- Occupations: Writer, film critic
- Awards: Ordre des Arts et des Lettres (1982)

Lotte Henriette Regina Eisner (5 March 1896, Berlin – 25 November 1983, Paris) was a German-French writer, film critic, archivist and curator. Eisner worked initially as a film critic in Berlin, then in Paris where in 1936 she met Henri Langlois with whom she founded the Cinémathèque Française.

== Early life and education ==
She was born Lotte Henriette Regina Eisner in Berlin, the daughter of textile manufacturer Hugo Eisner and his wife Margarethe Feodora Aron. Eisner grew up in a prosperous Jewish middle-class milieu and in 1924 obtained a Ph.D. from the University of Rostock. Her dissertation was on the development of Greek vases.

== Career ==
In 1924, she began working as a freelance theatre critic until in 1927, Hans Feld, a friend of her brother, suggested she worked for him at Film Kurier, one of many film trade papers in Berlin. She joined the Film Kurier as a staff journalist, writing a mixture of articles and interviews and the occasional film review including the premiere of Mädchen in Uniform. Most of the premieres and major commercial feature films were reviewed by the men on the staff but occasionally she was allowed to assess them. In 1932, with the rise of National Socialism she became proof editor and reviewer-in-chief as members of staff began to leave Germany.

In March 1933, just three months after Adolf Hitler became Chancellor, Eisner fled Berlin to Paris where a sister lived. Here she lived precariously taking any job she could find (such as translating or babysitting) and working whenever possible as a freelance film critic for international journals and newspapers. In 1940, she was rounded up in the first Rafle du billet vert and taken to the Vel d'Hiv with hundreds of other single Jewish women. From there, they were transported to Gurs internment camp in the Pyrenees, a concentration camp run by the French for the Germans. After a few months, she managed to escape and travelled to Montpellier, where she enrolled briefly as a student before finding her way to Rodez and to Pastor Exbrayat, who helped her to obtain false papers; she consequently became Louise Escoffier from the Alsace region. She remained in touch with Henri Langlois, who was in Paris, and was placing cans of film in secret locations around the country to prevent them from falling into the hands of the Nazis. One of those places was near Figeac in central France, in the cellars of Château de Béduer. Langlois instructed Eisner to go there to preserve the films (including The Great Dictator). Eisner accomplished this in freezing cold conditions for a month before running out of money. In need of help, she managed to gain a job in a girls school in Figeac. Badly treated, she began to teach German to some Spanish girls living with the local school teacher Madame Guitard, who took her in; she stayed there until the liberation of Paris in late August 1944.

After the liberation of Paris, Eisner rejoined Langlois and became Chief Curator at the Cinémathèque Française, where over a period of forty years she was responsible for collecting, saving and curating films, costumes, set designs, art work, cameras and scripts for the Cinémathèque. At the same time, Eisner began to work in private on her book L'Écran démoniaque later translated as The Haunted Screen which she described in a letter to Fritz Lang as "a book on German silent film". She also published essays, articles and film reviews in journals including Revue du cinéma, which later became Cahiers du cinéma. In 1952, Eisner published her most highly acclaimed book, L'Écran démoniaque, her study of the influence of the spirit of German Expressionism on cinema, translated into English as The Haunted Screen in 1969. Eisner subsequently published studies of F.W. Murnau (1964) and of Fritz Lang (1976), with Lang's collaboration. Murnau was awarded the Prix Armand Tallier in 1965

In the late 1950s, she became a friend of and mentor of Werner Herzog and other leading young German film makers, including Wim Wenders, Volker Schlöndorff and Herbert Achternbusch. When Eisner fell gravely ill in 1974, Herzog walked from Munich to Paris in winter. Herzog commented: "It was clear to me that if I did it, Eisner wouldn't die." Eisner appears in Herzog's autobiographical documentary Portrait Werner Herzog (1986). In his 2 February 2016 interview at Stanford University, Herzog claims that 8 years later she complained to him of her infirmities and asked: "I am saturated with life. There is still this spell upon me that I must not die - can you lift it?" He says that he did, and she died 8 days later. Wenders' film Paris, Texas (1984) is dedicated to her memory.

== Death and legacy ==
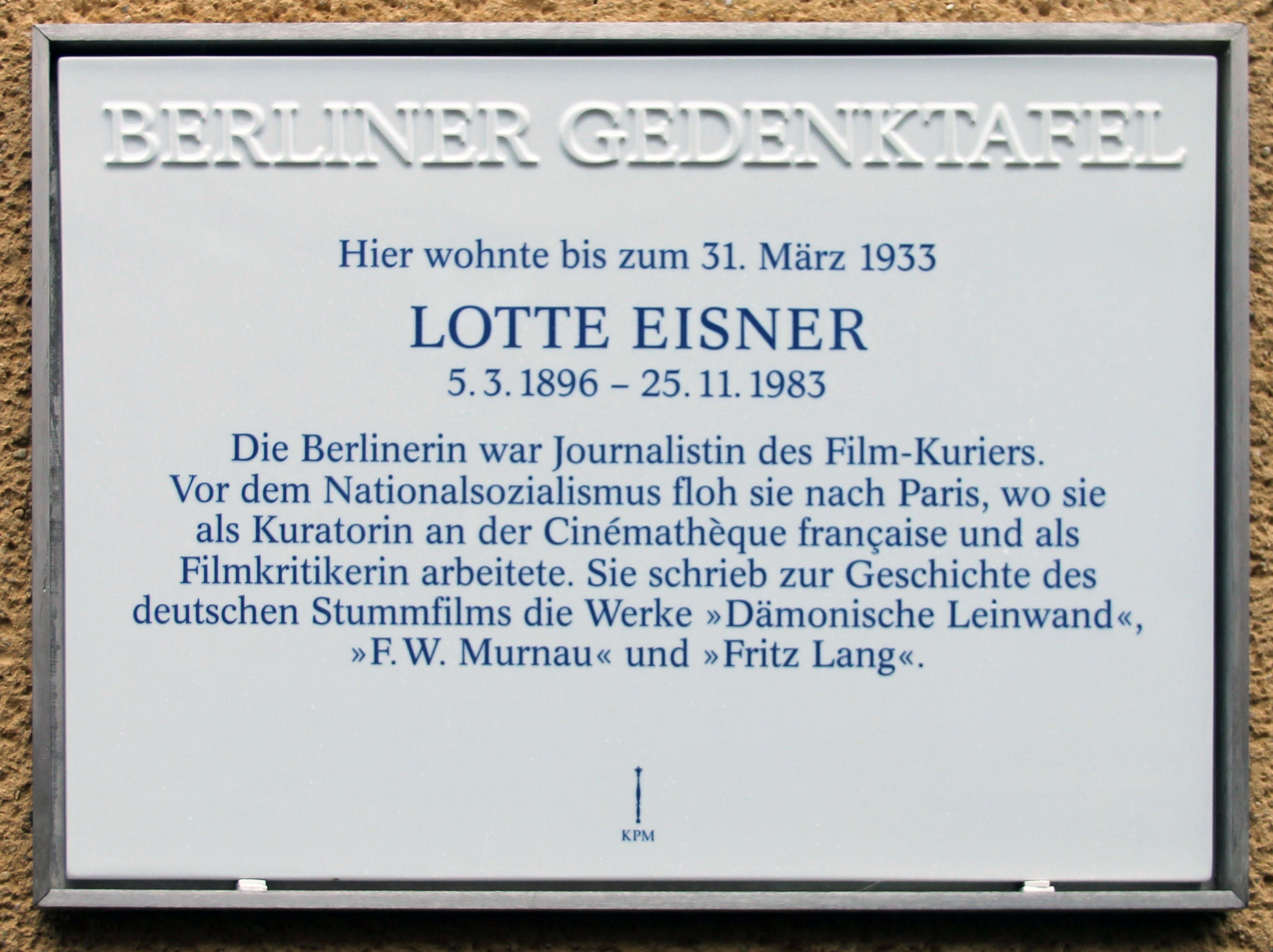
Lotte Eisner plaque

Werner Herzog dedicated his 1974 film The Enigma of Kaspar Hauser to her.

On her death in 1983, French minister of culture Jack Lang declared that the loss of Eisner would be "a great loss for the French cinema" which would be "felt with profound sadness by her numerous friends in the film world."

Posthumously in 1984, Eisner's memoir Ich hatte einst ein schönes Vaterland (Once I Had a Beautiful Fatherland) was published. The title is a quotation from the poem In der Fremde (Abroad) by Heinrich Heine.

Wim Wenders dedicated his film Paris, Texas to Eisner in the movie's closing credits.

== Honours ==
Eisner became a French citizen in 1955 and as a result was particularly honoured to be awarded Chevalier de l'Ordre National de la Légion d'honneur and the Chevalier des Arts et des Lettres, in 1982.

== Writings ==
- Murnau France 1964, US and UK 1972
- Fritz Lang, Da Capo Press, New Edition 1986, ISBN 0-306-80271-6
- Die dämonische Leinwand, engl. The Haunted Screen: Expressionism in the German Cinema and the Influence of Max Reinhardt, University of California Press, Second Edition 2008, ISBN 0-520-25790-1
- Ich hatte einst ein schönes Vaterland. Memoiren, Munich: dtv, 1988 dictated to Martje Grohmann at the end of her life this book is a memoir of her life in Berlin, her escape to Paris, her war time experiences and finally her work at the Cinémathèque Française. She talks in detail about the many amazing filmmakers, designers and actors she knew during her long life.
