= Die Nacht der Seele =

Studio album by Popol Vuh
- Released: 1979
- Recorded: March 15–August 1, 1979
- Studios: Bavaria Muskistudios, Panna-Paulsen Studios
- Label: Brain Records
- Producer: Florian Fricke

Popol Vuh chronology
Nosferatu (1978)	Die Nacht der Seele (1979)	Sei still, wisse ICH BIN (1981)

Die Nacht der Seele (subtitled "Tantric Songs") is the twelfth album by Popol Vuh. It was originally released in 1979 on Brain Records. In 2005 SPV re-released the album with four bonus tracks. "Engel der Luft" and "Im Reich der Schatten" (slowed down) were used in 1982 for the soundtrack of Werner Herzog's film Fitzcarraldo.

== Track listing ==
All tracks composed by Florian Fricke except where noted.

1. "Mantram der Erdberührung I" – 2:13
2. "Engel der Luft" – 2:38
3. "Mit Händen, mit Füßen" – 2:42
4. "Wo bist Du, der Du überwunden hast?" / "Gesegnet Du, Bei Deiner Ankunft" – 5:41
5. "Mantram der Erdberührung II" – 2:12
6. "Im Reich der Schatten" (Fricke, Daniel Fichelscher) – 2:10
7. "Wanderer durch die Nacht" – 4:07
8. "Mantram der Herzberührung I" – 1:48
9. "Auf dem Weg" – 2:53
10. "Mantram der Herzberührung II" – 1:40
11. "In der Halle des Lernens" – 4:02

2005 bonus tracks

All bonus tracks composed by Florian Fricke and Daniel Fichelscher.

12. "Mantram der Stirnberührung I" – 2:16
13. "Zusammenkunft" – 0:47
14. "Mantram der Stirnberührung II" – 2:03
15. "Im Garten der Ruhe (Piano Session Version)" – 10:19

== Personnel ==
- Florian Fricke – piano, vocals
- Daniel Fichelscher – guitar, percussion
- Djong Yun – vocals
- Renate Knaup – vocals

Guest musicians

- Susan Goetting – oboe
- Alois Gromer – sitar

== Credits ==
- Recorded in 1979 at Bavaria Ton Studios, München and Panne/Paulsen Studio, Frankfurt/Main
- Engineered by Hans Keller, Rudolf Wohlschläger, Eberhard Panne & Robert Wedel
- Produced by Florian Fricke for Gammarock Music
- Executive producer: Gerhard Augustin
