= Daniel Fichelscher =

German musician

- Born: Daniel Secundus Fichelscher; 3 July 1953 (age 72)
- Instruments: Guitars; drums; percussions
- Labels: Liberty; Pilz; Kosmische Musik; UA; PDU; Milan; Spalax; OHR; Brain Records
- Formerly of: Popol Vuh; Amon Düül II; Gila

Daniel "Danny" Secundus Fichelscher (born 3 July 1953 in Berlin) is a German guitarist and drummer who played a pivotal role in Krautrock band Popol Vuh, was a member of the German group Gila and is currently Amon Düül II's drummer. Fichelscher is the son of jazz pianist and singer Toby Fichelscher.

== Career ==
Daniel Fichelscher was, for most of their history, Florian Fricke's only stable partner in Popol Vuh. He wasn't a founding member, having joined in 1973 (three years after the group's foundation) for the recording of the album Seligpreisung and replaced guitarist Conny Veit the following year in 1974. While playing with Popol Vuh, he also occasionally played drums and congas with the Krautrock band Amon Düül II, appearing for example on the albums Carnival in Babylon (1972), Wolf City (1972; on which he also sang and played guitar), and Vortex (1981). Together with Fricke, he also played in Conny Veit's group Gila on their second album, Bury My Heart at Wounded Knee.

Fichelscher's importance within Popol Vuh began to diminish around 1991 when he was flanked by Guido Hieronymus, who also played guitar and who greatly influenced the group's music. But Fichelscher still maintained a significant role in the group. Since 2006, after Florian Fricke's death and Popol Vuh's dissolution, Fichelscher has played drums again with Amon Düül II, replacing the group's original drummer, the late Peter Leopold.

== Discography with Popol Vuh ==
- Seligpreisung (1973)
- Einsjäger und Siebenjäger (1974)
- Das Hohelied Salomos (1975)
- Aguirre (1975)
- Letzte Tage - Letzte Nächte (1976)
- Herz aus Glas (1977)
- Nosferatu (On the Way to a Little Way) (1978)
- Brüder des Schattens – Söhne des Lichts (1978)
- Die Nacht der Seele (1979)
- Sei still, wisse ich bin (1981)
- Agape - Agape (1983)
- Spirit of Peace (1985)
- Cobra Verde (1987)
- For You and Me (1991)

== Discography with Amon Düül II ==
- Carnival in Babylon (1972)
- Wolf City (1972)
- Live in London (live) (1973)

== Discography with Utopia ==
- Utopia (reissued as by Amon Düül II) (1973)
