= Klaus Wiese =

German musician (1942–2009)

Klaus Wiese (January 18, 1942 – January 27, 2009 in Ulm) was a veteran e-musician, minimalist, and multi-instrumentalist. A master of the Tibetan singing bowl, he created an extensive series of album releases using them. Wiese also used the human voice, the zither, Persian stringed instruments, chimes, and other exotic instruments in his music.

Wiese is considered by some as one of the great ambient or space music artists alongside Robert Rich, Steve Roach, Michael Stearns, Constance Demby, and Jonn Serrie. His musical style is much more appropriately compared to the organic soundscapes of drone and dark ambient music, such as Oöphoi, Alio Die, Mathias Grassow, and Tau Ceti.

He was briefly a member of the krautrock band Popol Vuh in the early 1970s where he played tanpura on the albums Hosianna Mantra and Seligpreisung. Eventually Wiese would move away from krautrock to his own version of long tone ambient music by the 1980s. In the 1990s he founded the Nono Orchestra to play the giant sheetmetal instruments of Robert Rutman.

His music has regularly been featured on nationally syndicated radio programs such as Hearts of Space and Star's End.

Wiese is known also for his collaborations with Al Gromer Khan, Mathias Grassow, Oöphoi, Tau Ceti, Saam Schlamminger, and Ted de Jong. He collaborated with Deuter on his Silence is the Answer album in 1980 and East of the Full Moon in 2005. Twenty-four albums of material were released in 2004 alone.

He traveled the East for many years studying Sufism and Mysticism which clearly influenced his spiritual, ambient music.

== Death ==
Klaus Wiese died on 27 January 2009 at the age of 67. "It wasn't obvious he was sick and he was not suffering from any known illness. He died unexpectedly during the night."
