= Gila (band) =

German band

- Origin: Stuttgart, Germany
- Genres: Krautrock, psychedelic rock, psychedelic folk, progressive rock
- Years active: 1969–1974
- Labels: BASF, Warner Bros.
- Past members: Daniel Alluno, Fritz Scheyhing, Conny Veit, Walter Wiederkehr, Florian Fricke, Daniel Fichelscher, Sabine Merbach

Gila was a psychedelic rock band from Stuttgart, Germany.

== Biography ==
The band formed in early 1969 and, with their new/experimental sound, they secured a considerable German fan base. Gila's original lineup was Daniel Alluno (drums, bongos, tabla, percussion), Fritz Scheyhing (organ, mellotron, percussion, keyboards), Conny Veit (guitars, vocals, tabla, additional keyboards) and Walter Wiederkehr (bass). In 1971, they recorded their début album Gila – Free Electric Sound and disbanded in 1972.

In 1973, Veit reformed the band with a new lineup, and the same year recorded their second studio album, the krautrock/psychedelic folk Bury My Heart at Wounded Knee. In 1974, they disbanded again.

In 1999, a live album was released, Night Works, which was recorded in 1972 and was originally intended for radio broadcast.

== Discography ==
- Gila (BASF; 1971)
- Bury My Heart at Wounded Knee (Warner Bros.; 1973)
- Night Works (Garden of Delights; 1999, reissued as Free Electric Rock Sessions)

== Lineup ==
- Conny Veit – guitars, vocals, percussion, keyboards (1969–1972, 1973–1974); flute, bass (1973–1974)
- Daniel Alluno – drums, percussion (1969–1972)
- Fritz Scheyhing – keyboards, percussion (1969–1972)
- Walter Wiederkehr – bass (1969–1972)
- Sabine Merbach – vocals (1973–1974)
- Florian Fricke – keyboards (1973–1974)
- Daniel Fichelscher – drums, percussion, bass (1973–1974)
