= Athlit (album) =

Studio album by Oöphoi
- Released: June 15, 2002
- Genre: Ambient
- Length: 73:44
- Label: Hypnos Recordings
- Producer: Oöphoi

Oöphoi chronology
Mare Tranquillitatis (2001)	Athlit (2002)	Bardo (2002)

Professional ratings
Review scores
Source	Rating
Allmusic	4/5 stars

Athlit is an album by ambient musician Oöphoi. It was released in 2002 on Hypnos Recordings.

== Track listing ==
1. "Drifting into Black Space" - 16:40
2. "An Ever-Changing Horizon" - 10:30
3. "On Wings Of Light" - 18:05
4. "Lord Of The Starfields" - 28:31
