= Gerhard Augustin =

German music producer (1941–2021)

- Born: 7 September 1941; Hagen, Germany
- Died: 17 March 2021 (aged 79); Bremen, Germany
- Occupations: Producer, manager, A&R, disc jockey
- Known for: Co-founder of Beat-Club
- Television: Beat-Club

Gerhard Augustin (7 September 1941 – 17 March 2021) was a German music producer. He was the first professional disc jockey in Germany and co-founder of the music program Beat-Club. Augustin helped generate a shift in German culture by introducing various genres of music at a time when schlager was the standard by giving exposure to krautrock bands such as Amon Düül II and Popol Vuh. He later became the head of A&R for United Artists Records in Munich, and then the producer and manager for American R&B duo Ike & Tina Turner.

== Life and career ==
Augustin was born in Hagen, Germany on 7 September 1941. Augustin's love for music began at 15 years old when he heard Elvis Presley's song "Don't be Cruel" on the AFN Bremerhaven in 1956.

In the early 1960s, he received a green card to live in New York City for two years. He adapted easily to the new country due to his knowledge of popular American music. When he arrived in New York City, he first lived in the Bronx, then Greenwich Village. There he met Richie Havens and Bob Dylan in 1962. He shared an apartment with the musicians Charlie Chin of Cat Mother & the All Night Newsboys, Steve Turnage and Charles Kimbrough. He worked at Stechert-Hafner bookstore, attended concerts of Nina Simone and Thelonious Monk, who created his music in front of the audience on stage by involving the audience in the composition process. Augustin often visited the Village Gate and Village Vanguard clubs, where he met Miriam Makeba, Harry Belafonte, Miles Davis, and Bill Cosby.

In 1963, Augustin became first German disc jockey in Bremen. He created a discothèque named the Twen Club in the basement of a restaurant, The Gypsy Cellar. He became well-known in Bremen and northern Germany.

In 1965, Augustin met Michael Leckebusch at his Twen Club. Leckebusch, a former trumpet player in a theatre band in Hamburg, came to work for Radio Bremen TV. Augustin became friends with Leckebusch and they created the television show Beat-Club, which is considered Germany's first rock music program. The series was inspired by Augustin's travels where he had seen the American music program Shindig! and the British music program Top of the Pops. The Beat-Club premiered in September 1965, broadcast from Bremen and was produced by the regional TV network Radio Bremen. Augustin was a co-host of the first seven shows. The show became an immediate sensation. "People from the older generation (old Nazis) hated it, young kids loved it and said things like 'keep it going' and so on. It caused a real reaction between the generations," Augustin said. Eventually, his relationship with Leckebusch deteriorated because Leckebusch was taking credit for the success of the show, and Augustin got phased out of the show. In December 1972, the Beat-Club was replaced by another music program, Musikladen, which was on air until 1984.

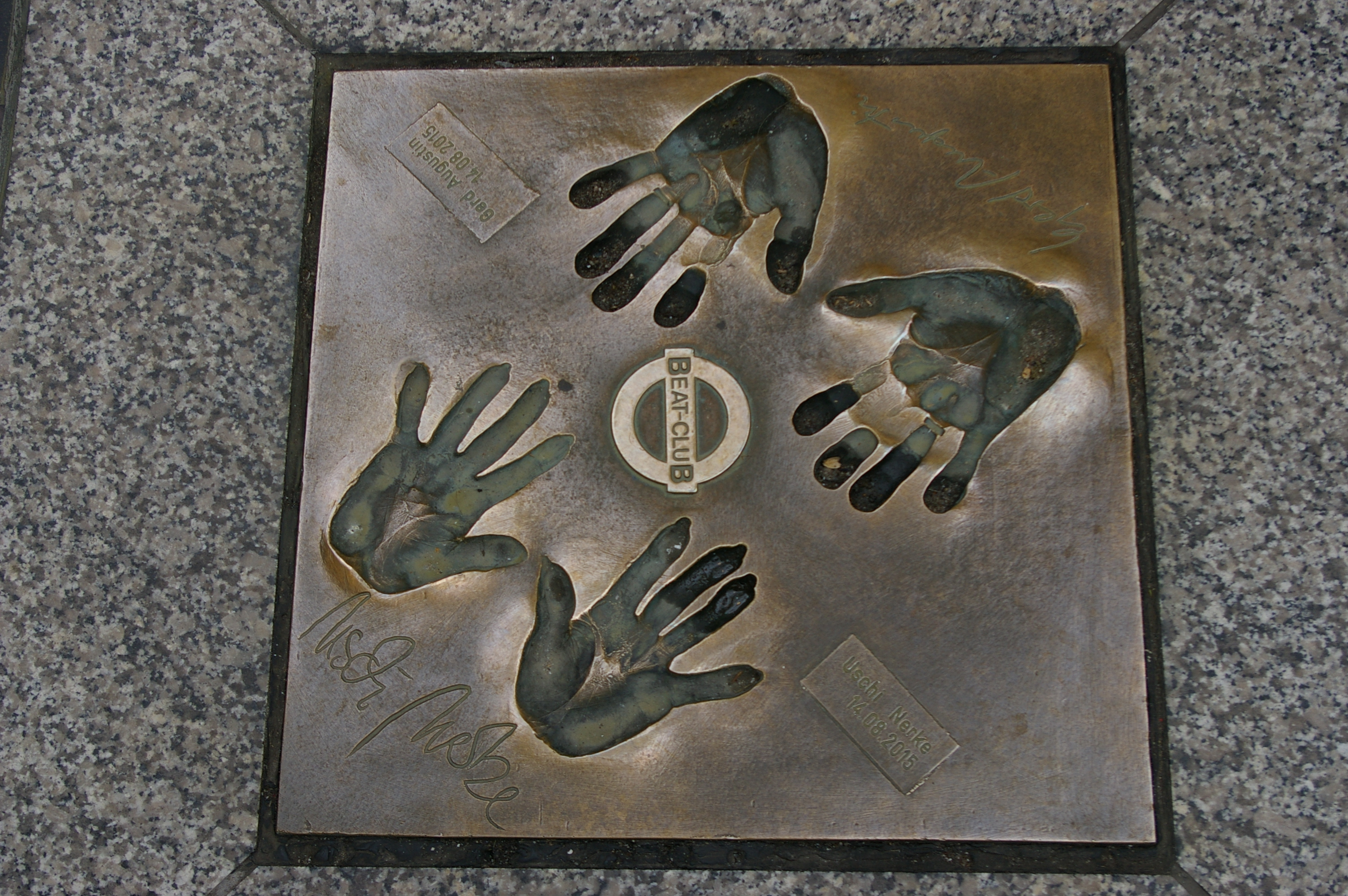
Handprints by Uschi Nerke and Gerd Augustin at Lloyd-Passage (Mall of Fame) in Bremen, Germany.

After Augustin left the Beat-Club in 1967, he moved to San Francisco in 1968. There he met and befriended promoter Bill Graham who introduced him to bands such as the Grateful Dead, Quicksilver, Sly & the Family Stone, and Ike & Tina Turner. While in San Francisco, he worked at KQED TV. He was awarded a scholarship to attend Stanford University where he received a diploma in Mass Communications. After graduation, he worked in Los Angeles with United Artists Records. In 1969, United Artists sent Augustin to work for the company in Germany. Siegfried Loch, head of Star-Club record label, started a German flagship label for United Artists/Liberty Records, to aim both at the domestic market and abroad. After two years as assistant managing director of United Artists' German office, Augustin joined the A&R department in 1971. He signed the bands Amon Düül II, Popol Vuh, and Can to the label.

Augustin produced various Ike & Tina Turner songs and albums, including Feel Good (1972), Blues Roots (1972), and Sweet Rhode Island Red (1974) which were made at the Turners' Bolic Sound studio. In 1975, he left his position as head of A&R for United Artists Records in Munich to become their manager until their split in 1976.

In 1976, Augustin formed the company Gammarock Musik in Los Angeles with Patrick Gammon. In 1979, United Artists took over the administration of Gammarock Musik. He later hosted a public radio show in Bremen.

In 2015, Augustin's handprints were added to the Mall of Fame in Bremen with Uschi Nerke who hosted Beat-Club and Musikladen.

== Health and Death ==
On 17 March 2021 Augustin died at the age of 79 in Bremen, where he had lived for about 15 years. A year and a half prior, Augustin had suffered a stroke from which he never fully recovered.

== Production credits ==
=== Singles ===
- 1972: Ike & Tina Turner – "Up In Heah" / "Doo Wah Ditty (Got To Get Ta)"
- 1972: Ike & Tina Turner – "Chopper"
- 1972: Ike Turner – "Think" / "Lawdy Miss Clawdy"
- 1972: Ike Turner – "Right On" / "Tacks In My Shoes"
- 1972: Demon Thor – "East And West" / "Ant Hill"
- 1973: Missing Link – "Friday On My Mind" / "Kid's Hunting"
- 1973: Demon Thor – "For One Little Moment" / "Good Morning"
- 1973: Demon Thor – "Pink Mary" / "The Army (Part II)"
- 1974: Ike & Tina Turner – "Sexy Ida (Part I)" / "Sexy Ida (Part II)"
- 1976: Patrick Gammon – "Party Hardy"
- 1978: Days – "Love Only Hurts" / "(Roll Up To The) Mystery Tour"

=== Albums ===
- 1970: Popol Vuh – Affenstunde
- 1972: Missing Link – Nevergreen!
- 1972: Tommy Fortman – Demon Thor (Anno 1972)
- 1972: Ike Turner – Blues Roots
- 1972: Ike & Tina – Feel Good
- 1972: Delf Jacobs – Meine Lieder
- 1974: Demon Thor – Written In The Sky
- 1974: Tommy Fortmann – Sunshine In Deep Darkness
- 1974: Ike & Tina Turner – Sweet Rhode Island Red
- 1978: Patrick Gammon – Rawness
- 1978: Popol Vuh – Nosferatu
- 1978: Popol Vuh – Brüder des Schattens – Söhne des Lichts
- 1982: Gammarock – Spread The News*
- 1990: Popol Vuh – Florian Fricke
- 1993: Patrick Gammon – Outch Baby*
- 1994: Popol Vuh – Movie Music*
- 1996: Ike Turner – My Bluescountry*
- 1997: Amon Düül II – Flawless
- 1997: Popol Vuh – Shepherd's Symphony – Hirtensymphonie*
- 2000: Amon Düül II – Phallus Dei (reissue)*
- 2000: Amon Düül II – Utopia (reissue)
- 2000: Amon Düül II – Lemmingmania*
- 2000: Amon Düül II – Tanz Der Lemminge (reissue)*

*indicates albums credited as Executive Producer

== Books ==
- 1986: Tina Turner (ISBN 9783404611003)
- 1989: Die Beat-Jahre: Musik in Deutschland - d. sechziger Jahre [The Beat Years. Music in Germany in the sixties] (ISBN 9783442210176)
