= Gila (album) =

Studio album by Gila
- Released: 1971
- Recorded: 7–15 June 1971
- Studio: Dierks Studios (Cologne)
- Genre: Krautrock, progressive rock, psychedelic rock
- Length: 37:36
- Label: BASF Records (20.21109-6)
- Producer: Gila

Gila chronology
Gila (1971)	Bury My Heart at Wounded Knee (1973)

Professional ratings
Review scores
Source	Rating
Allmusic	4.5/5 stars

Gila is the debut studio album by German krautrock band Gila. The album has the subtitle Free Electric Sound, and often the album title is written as Gila – Free Electric Sound.

== Track listing ==
1. "Aggression" – (4:33)
2. "Kommunikation" – (12:47)
3. "Kollaps" – (5:30)
4. "Kontakt" – (4:30)
5. "Kollektivität" – (6:40)
6. "Individualität" – (3:36)

== Personnel ==
- Daniel Alluno – drums, bongos, tabla
- Fritz Scheyhing – organ, Mellotron, percussion, electronic effects
- Conny Veit – electric and acoustic guitars, vocals, tabla, electronic effects
- Walter Wiederkehr – bass
