= Brüder des Schattens – Söhne des Lichts =

Brüder des Schattens - Söhne des Lichts

Studio album by Popol Vuh
- Released: 1978
- Recorded: Aug 1978
- Genre: New-age
- Length: 36:10
- Label: Brain Records

Popol Vuh chronology
Herz aus Glas (1977)	Brüder des Schattens - Söhne des Lichts (1978)	Nosferatu (1978)

Italian issue cover

Brüder des Schattens – Söhne des Lichts (English: "Brothers of the Shadow – Sons of Light") is the tenth album by Popol Vuh. It was originally released in 1978 on Brain Records. In 2006 SPV re-released the album with one bonus track that was originally released on the remix compilation Sing, for Song Drives Away the Wolves in 1993. The first two tracks from this album were used for the soundtrack of Werner Herzog's film Nosferatu the Vampyre.

In Italy the album was released with an entirely different artwork and under the title Nosferatu the Vampyre (Original Soundtrack) (PDU A 7005).

AllMusic stated in its review of the album, "Released today, BRUDER might be classified as a new-age album; in the 1970s, however, this was groundbreaking music."

== Track listing ==
All tracks composed by Florian Fricke, except tracks 3 and 4 composed by Florian Fricke and Daniel Fichelscher.

1. "Brüder des Schattens – Söhne des Lichts" – 18:47
2. "Höre, der du wagst" – 5:52
3. "Das Schloß des Irrtums" – 5:35
4. "Die Umkehr" – 5:57

2006 bonus track

5. "Sing, for Song Drives Away the Wolves" – 4:15

== Personnel ==
- Florian Fricke – piano
- Daniel Fichelscher – electric guitar, acoustic guitar, percussion

Guest musicians

- Robert Eliscu – oboe
- Alois Gromer – sitar
- Ted de Jong – tamboura
- A church choir ensemble from Munich
- Guido Hieronymus – digital instruments (on track number 5, 2006 bonus track)

== Credits ==
Recorded at Bavaria Studio, Munich, in August 1978
Engineered by Rudolf Wohlschager, assisted by Peter Eichenseher
Produced by Gerhard Augustin for Gammarock Music

2006 edition bonus track, "Sing, for Song Drives Away the Wolves", recorded by Guido Hieronymus at New African Studio in Munich on December 5, 1992, and produced by Florian Fricke and Frank Fiedler.
