= Australian Fairy Tale Society =

The Australian Fairy Tale Society (AFTS) is a society of academics, artists, storytellers, musicians, writers, and fairy tale lovers that has been operating since 2013, for the purpose of exploring fairy tales through an Australian perspective.

== History ==
The AFTS began with a Facebook conversation between co-founders Reilly McCarron and Jo Henwood in July 2013. A Pozible crowd funding campaign,and initial enthusiasm expressed through a Founding Membership including fairy tale scholars Jack Zipes and Maria Tatar, led to an inaugural conference in Sydney in June 2014. The first committee was elected at the conference on Monday 9 June 2014, with Reilly McCarron as president, Julie Mundy-Taylor as vice president, Pam Blamey as Secretary, Danuta Raine as Treasurer, and Jo Henwood (co-founder), Belinda Calderone, and Thang D. Luong as committee members.

== Structure ==
The Society is an unincorporated entity, and registered charity with the Australian Charities and Not-for-profits Commission, having voluntarily revoked its legal status as an incorporation in 2019 when it was not possible to fill the officebearer positions, at which time the present constitution was adapted. There are no paid positions within the Society.

== Objectives ==
The goals of the organisation are to collect, organise and catalogue original Australian fairy tales, adaptations and interpretations, and criticism and to discuss, analyse and encourage the creation of Australian fairy tale works.

== Activities ==
The Australian Fairy Tale Society Award is given each year to someone who has contributed significantly to the field of fairy tales in Australia judged according to a body of work that has enduring significance. The nominee does not have to be a member of the AFTS but both the nominations and voting are only available to members. Notable winners have been Kate Forsyth in 2018, Lorena Carrington in 2020, and Louisa John-Krol in 2021.

Fairy Tale Rings, meeting in online or local groups around Australia, discuss five featured tales a year, according to the story's history and variants, meanings, and Australian perspective, and can feature storytelling, displays, and a chance to find out what is happening in the Fairy Tale world today.

The Society hosts annual conferences, a YouTube channel, including a podcast series, and a webseries about the French Salonnieres, and a Redbubble merchandise shop of member artists' work.

== Publications ==
- South of the Sun: Australian Fairy Tales for the 21st Century is an anthology of contemporary, original Australian fairy tales and art, produced by the Australian Fairy Tale Society in partnership with Serenity Press in 2021.
- The Australian Fairy Tale Society Ezine has been produced irregularly since 2016 for members, composed of contributions (stories, art, reviews etc.) by AFTS members.
