= Mathias Grassow =

German ambient musician (1963–2025)

- Born: 9 May 1963
- Origin: Wiesbaden, Hesse, West Germany
- Died: 13 August 2025 (aged 62)
- Genres: Ambient; Drone ambient Dark ambient
- Instrument: Steel Cello
- Years active: 1980–2025
- Website: www.mathias-grassow.de

Mathias Grassow (9 May 1963 – 13 August 2025) was a German ambient musician whose recordings can also be classified in the genres of dark ambient and drone ambient. His music often has a meditative and emotional and spiritual context, which induces deep feelings of introspection in listeners. Over his long career, he collaborated extensively with other notable ambient composers such as Klaus Wiese, Oöphoi, Alio Die, and Tomas Weiss.

== Life and career ==
Grassow was born on 9 May 1963. He played drums and guitar in the 1970s and moved on to keyboards in the early 1980s. Later, he became interested in keyboards and electronic synths. He had an interest in Alan Watts books and spirituality. His interests progressed from Buddhism to Sufism and to the mystical side of Christianity. He became interested in overtone and subharmonic chants, long deep synthesizer drones, and in Indian classical music. Later he was influenced by the singing bowl sound recordings of Klaus Wiese. Grassow died on 13 August 2025, at the age of 62.

== Discography ==
Notable albums include the following:

- 1991, Prophecy
- 1993, In Search Of Sanity
- 1997, Namakar
- 1998, Elixir
- 1998, Himavat
- 1999, Dissolution
- 1999, Himalaya
- 2000, Cosmic Chasm
- 2000, The Fragrance Of Eternal Roses
- 2006, Dronament
- 2006, Opus Posthumum
- 2007, Deeper Purity
- 2009, Calibration
