= Al Gromer Khan =

German-born sitar player and composer

Al Gromer Khan (born April 8, 1946) is a German sitar player and composer whose music spans the multiple genres of ambient, new age, world and electronica. He is author of four novels and author of National-Radio documentaries and features about music for more than 25 years and works as a visual artist.

Al Gromer Khan was awarded the Rabindranath Tagore Cultural Prize 2015 for his lifetime achievement as musician/performer on sitar and surbahar of the highest order, composer, writer and visual artist by the Indo-German Society.

== Early influences ==
Al Gromer Khan was born Alois Gromer on April 8, 1946, at Frauenzell in the alpine foothills of Bavaria between Lake Constance and Munich.

During his college time he founded a skiffle group, became a jazz guitarist and left his home to become a jazz musician and beat poet, spending time in London, Tangier and India.

Gromer Khan claims that he was drawn to the "mysteries of sound", from early childhood, be it the sound of the bells worn by the Bavarian cows grazing in the alpine meadows near his birthplace, or the "singing" telephone wires on the wind in the freezing Bavarian winters, and later American blues and country music, Indian stringed instruments, the drums of North Africa. Gromer Khan claims to have rejected the academic or diplomatic careers his parents expected him to take up.

The 1960s found a twenty-something Al Gromer in London where he took part in a number of creative experiments which were to have a lasting influence on him. According to Gromer Khan, the Prince Tiane na Champassak of Laos introduced him to tantric art and pop star Marc Bolan invited him to join in the all-night jam sessions he hosted. He explored psycho-acoustic phenomena with film director Mike Figgis, and saxophonist Ronnie Scott of Ronnie Scott's Jazzclub, who introduced Al to Ben Webster, Max Roach and Miles Davis, while Cat Stevens (now known as Yusuf Islam), gave him a taste for English poetry. At times he attended a London art school.

== Development as a sitarist ==
Gromer Khan's creative encounters during the 1960s deeply formed his musical taste and style; however, Gromer’s ultimate musical awakening came at a recital by sitarist Ustad Vilayat Khan in Westminster Abbey 1968. Gromer Khan professes to have been so moved by the performance that he instantly decided to devote his life to the study of the sitar. He went to India, where he was to find a powerful teacher in Vilayat Khan's brother, Ustad Imrat Khan. Gromer Khan remained in India for the next three years, speed-learning his instrument at the feet of his guru. He returned to Bavaria in 1973, already an accomplished sitarist.

Gromer Khan spent the next 7 years studying with Imrat Khan in Europe and India. In 1975, his teacher performed the Ghanda Ceremony, thus initiating Al Gromer into the Khan-I-Gharana lineage of sitarists. He was the first outsider to be accepted into this particular Gharana, which like most Hindustani musical traditions, passes knowledge down the generations from father to son. After his initiation, Al Gromer added "Khan" to his name.

== Creative works ==
Concurrently, Khan is engaged in a number of experimental projects, pioneering the proto-electronic music amongst others together with Popol Vuh. He was involved in contemplative and world music for radio, television, film and sound recordings projects. With his extensive compositional work he was the initiator and key figure of musical genres that are now known as Ambient and World Music, New Age.

Travel and concerts of classical Indian music in India and Europe followed. In addition, texts and documentaries on music for various ARD radio stations. Since 1974, Khan has released more than 50 albums.

He currently resides in Munich, Germany.

In 2006 the novel Der Lehrer sein Schüler und der weiße Mogul audiobook was released. 2007 the short novel Jazzweihnacht audiobook followed. 2011 the English version e-book Jazzchristmas. 2009 the novels Jimi of Silence and Der weiße Mogul were released. 2013 the English version The White Mogul and e-book 2015. Kurt und Bongo und die Hippies novel released in German 2017 as well as the English version Kurt and Bongo and the Hippies book and e-book.

== Discography ==
- Perfect Day, 2024 Rasa Music
- Tariqa, 2023 Rasa Music
- TRANCE, 2022 Rasa Music
- Ambient Religion, 2022 Rasa Music
- A Gentle Aspect, 2021 Rasa Music
- SINGING BACK TO ZIRYAB, 2021 Rasa Music
- Silent Gold Keeps My Forehead Hidden, Single 2021 Rasa Music
- ONCE AGAIN THE NIGHT, 2020 Rasa Music
- SILENCE in a BLUE ROOM, 2019 Rasa Music
- IN HIGH PLACES, 2019 Rasa Music
- DURGA AVENUE, 2018 Rasa Music
- SKY WORSHIP, 2018 Rasa Music
- THE GOD PERFUME, 2017 Rasa Music
- After the Crash, Single 2017 Rasa Music
- CHAKRA NOIR, 2016 Rasa Music
- Day of the Beloved, 2016 Rasa Music
- LALITA-The Eternal Feminine, 2015 Rasa Music
- Tibet Shakti, 2015 Rasa Music
- Inner Witness, 2014 Rasa Music
- FAR GO, 2013 Rasa Music
- KULA JAZZ ‘Tantric Miniatures’, 2012 Zustand
- Foret Diplomatique, 2011 Zustand
- Future Song, 2010 Zustand, Rasa Music AGK with Thomas Kagermann
- Sitar Secrets 2009 Rasa Music
- Lanoiah, 2008 Zustand, Rasa Music
- Negus, 2008 RASA Music
- Indian Music II, 2008 RASA Music, NER 2009
- Another Kind Of Silence, 2007 RASA Music
- Radio Yoga 2007 RASA Music
- Turya 2006 RASA Music
- The Alchemy of Happiness 2005 RASA Music AGK with Klaus Wiese
- Chai & Roses 2004 RASA Music Al Gromer Khan
- Savoy Tea Time 2004 RASA Music with Sébastien Illiano, Raed Khoshaba, Kai Taschner
- Tantra Electronica 2004 Rasa Music with Emin Corrado
- Indian Music 2002 RASA Music
- Future Lounge 2002 Rasa Music
- Lexus 2001 Intuition Wergo
- Sufi 2000 – New Age Voice Music Award 2001 - Rasa Music
- Almond Blossom Day 1999 Rasa Music
- Kamasutra Experience 1999 New Earth Records – Crossroads Music Awards/Gold Star
- Tantra Drums 1998 New Earth Records
- Marco Polo/ Tan Dun 1997 Sony/ Opera Al Gromer Khan/Soloist
- Space Hotel 1997 New Earth Records – New Age Voice Music Award 1999 - Rasa Music
- Black Marble and Sweet Fire 1996 Hearts of Space Records with Kai Taschner
- Monsoon Point 1995 New Earth Records with Amelia Cuni
- Konya 1994 Bluestar Music
- Attar – Musik als Parfüm 1994 Wergo
- Beautiful Marva 1993 Aquarius
- Utopia 1992 Rasa Music
- The God Perfume II 1992 Rasa Music
- Tabris 1991 Musicolor/ Araba
- Mahogany Nights 1990 Hearts of Space Records
- Kama Sutra II 1989 Musicolor/ Araba
- Music from an Eastern Rosegarden 1989 Rasa Music
- The God Perfume 1987 Rasa Music
- Chai and Roses 1987 Rasa Music
- Kama Sutra 1986 Eversongs with Jörg Evers
- The Neuschwanstein Tapes 1986 Rasa Music with Kai Taschner
- In High Places 1985 Rasa Music with Klaus Wiese
- Hymns of Secret Glory 1984 Rasa Music with Klaus Wiese
- Divan I Khas 1984 Isis with Mario Strack
- Zuban 1981 Major Music/Isis with Mario Strack
- Uranus Venus 1980 Warner Bros. with Mario Strack, Ute Lenz, Jörg Evers
- Yoga Popol Vuh 1976 High Tide 1993 with Florian Fricke
- Hesse Between Music 1974 Wergo CD with P.M. Hamel, J.E. Berendt
- Cat Stevens 1970 Studioalbum Mona Bone Jakon Olympic Studio in Barnes - Fill My Eyes - Chorus: Al Gromer & Paul Simon Napier-Bell

=== Audio books ===
- Idries Shah - Die Weisheit der Narren, Zustand Verlag, Musik Al Gromer Khan - Surbahar
- Jazzweihnacht Rasa Music 2007
- Der Lehrer, sein Schüler und der weiße Mogul, Rasa Music 2006
- Der Tigerbericht 1990 Sheema Medien Dietrich Wild/Al Gromer Khan Neuauflage 2004

=== Books ===
- Jimi of Silence, Zustand Verlag 2009 - language German
- Der weiße Mogul, Zustand Verlag 2009
- Jazz Christmas“, Zustand Verlag, 2011 e-book
- The White Mogul“ English, Zustand Verlag 2015, ebook, Goodreads *****Readers‘ Favorite
- Kurt and Bongo and the Hippies, English, Zustand Verlag 2017, book and e-book

=== Soundtracks on ===
- Coer de Vere Herz aus Glas 1977 Werner Herzog Popol Vuh/Al Gromer Khan
- Nosferatu 1979 Werner Herzog Popol Vuh/Al Gromer Khan (participation)
- Un Divan A New York 1996 Chantal Akerman
- Sublime 2006 Tony Krantz
- Highway World 2008 Martin Hans Schmitt (Al Gromer Khan Soundtrack)

=== Collaboration with Popol Vuh ===
- Das Hohelied Salomos 1975
- Letzte Tage – Letzte Nächte 1976
- Brüder des Schattens – Söhne des Lichts 1978
- Die Nacht der Seele 1979

=== Exhibitions ===
- Kunstpavillon München ‚The Malakosha Ambience’ 1993
- Gasteig München ‚Friedensprozess’ 2001
- khan art Galerie ‚Tantric Miniatures’ 2011 München
- khan art ambient ‚Tantric Miniatures’ 2012 Berlin
- khanart Munich since 2012 yearly exhibitions with works/music by AGK & Ute Gromer
