= Conny Veit =

German musician and painter (born 1949)

- Also known as: Conny Veit, Coney Fight
- Born: Wolf Conrad Veit; 6 May 1949; Stuttgart, Germany
- Died: 10 October 2001 Hamburg, Germany
- Genres: Krautrock, progressive rock
- Occupations: Musician, songwriter, painter
- Instrument: Guitar
- Years active: 1969–1986
- Labels: BASF, Second Battle

Wolf Conrad "Conny" Veit (born 6 May 1949) was a German musician, singer, composer and painter, best known for his appearances in Gila and Popol Vuh. His main instrument was the guitar. His name was misspelled "Conny Veidt" in Gila's first album.

== Biography and career ==
Little is known about Conny's life. In 1969 he founded Gila which, in 1971, recorded their first album, Free Electric Sound. In 1972 he joined Popol Vuh for a short period.

According to Conny: as for myself, in 1972, aged 21, I decided to move to Munich, because Popol Vuh’s Florian Fricke had invited me to collaborate on his new LP Hosianna Mantra. I had accepted the offer, yet I didn't want to leave Gila because Popol Vuh was a pure studio project. Anyway for me, it was not until I took that step that my life as a professional musician began.

In 1973 he released the second Gila album, Bury my heart at wounded knee, with a new line-up featuring Daniel Fichelscher, Florian Fricke, Conny and his girlfriend Sabine Merbach. The second Gila iteration didn't have much of a lifespan either. Seemingly uninterested in touring, the band's focus splinted with Fichelscher and Fricke returning to Popol Vuh. For his part, Veit began working with Amon Düül II, before briefly hooking up with Guru Guru. He later turned his attention to painting. Suffering from alcoholism, Merbach died from liver failure.

Daniel Fichelscher once stated that Conny was my best friend, I will never forget how we played 8 days a week.

After the intensive work for Hosianna Mantra Conny Veit toured in France with Amon Düül II during the winter of 1973-1974 with Chis Karrer, John Weinzierl, Peter Leopold, Nick Woodland, Andy Vix and Jutta Weinhold.

During 1985 and 1986 he was member of a band called Coney Island, under the name of Coney Fight.

In August 1999, Conny wrote to Wolf-Reinhart Kotzsch (owner of Second Battle recording company), stating that he had found suitable musicians for a new line-up of Gila, with whom he wanted to overdub some tracks recorded in their rehearsal studio in the eighties, which had not been released at that point in time. In Conny's view, the tapes were very interesting, because they offered a view about the possible development of the group at that period, if that should ever have materialized. In Hamburg I found some motivated musicians with close contacts to Berlin to bring Gila back to life again. There are some valuable tapes, although the material is not known to the public.

Unfortunately, Second Battle couldn't get the project off the ground, because the label had to endure a lot of problems, like the insolvencies of business partners and the bootleg pirates, who have flooded the market of Progressive Rock for years and also destroyed more than one fellow company. Walter Nowicki released Gila's second album officially, so Conny had the chance to beat the bloodsucking "rip-off-managers" for once, just before his sad and untimely death.

In 2008, Second Battle reissued the 1999 album Night Works under the title Free Electric Rock Sessions – live in Köln 1972.
