= Lucki Stipetić =

German film producer

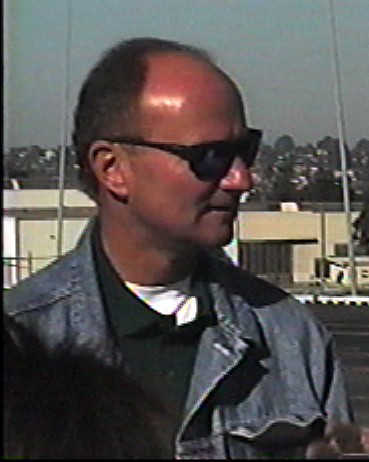
- Stipetić in San Diego, California, US 1996
- Born: Hartwolf Herzog-Stipetić
- Occupation: Film producer
- Website: wernerherzog.com

Hartwolf "Lucki" Stipetić (also Lucki Herzog) is a German film producer, and the younger half-brother of filmmaker Werner Herzog. Stipetić is the official head of Werner Herzog Filmproduktion, the production company which has produced almost all of his brother's films.

== Awards ==
- 1987 Bavarian Film Awards, Best Producer
