= Popol Vuh (band) =

German musical collective (1969–2001)

- Origin: Munich, West Germany
- Genres: Krautrock; ambient; world; psychedelia; new-age; electronic
- Years active: 1969–2001
- Labels: Liberty; Pilz; United Artists; Kosmische Kuriere; Brain; Innovative Communications
- Past members: Florian Fricke; Frank Fiedler; Holger Trülzsch; Djong Yun; Conny Veit; Daniel Fichelscher; Klaus Wiese; Bob Eliscu; Renate Knaup; Bettina Fricke; Alois Gromer; Ted De Jong; Guido Hieronymus; Maya Rose

Popol Vuh (German: [pɔpl̩ vuː]) were a German musical collective founded by keyboardist Florian Fricke in 1969 together with Frank Fiedler (sound design), Holger Trülzsch (percussion), and Bettina Fricke (tablas and production). The band took its name from the Mayan manuscript containing the mythology of highland Guatemala's K'iche' people. During the next two decades the membership often alternated, most notably including Djong Yun, Renate Knaup, Conny Veit, Daniel Fichelscher, Klaus Wiese, and Robert Eliscu.

Popol Vuh began as an electronic music project, but under Fricke's leadership they soon abandoned synthesizers for organic instrumentation and world music influences. They developed a productive working partnership with director Werner Herzog, contributing scores to films such as Aguirre, The Wrath of God (1972), Heart of Glass (1976), Nosferatu the Vampyre (1979), and Fitzcarraldo (1982). The group are associated with West Germany's 1970s krautrock movement and are considered progenitors of new-age and ambient music. Pitchfork magazine called Hosianna Mantra (1972) Popol Vuh's classic release.

== History ==
The band's name, taken from the Mayan manuscript, has been translated roughly as "meeting place" or "book of the community". Their first album, Affenstunde, released in 1970, can be regarded as one of the earliest space music works, featuring the then new sounds of the Moog synthesizer (rare sight in Germany of early 70s) together with ethnic percussion. This continued for only one more album, In den Gärten Pharaos, and material later to be released on the soundtrack to Aguirre, the Wrath of God, before Fricke largely abandoned electronic instruments in favour of piano-led compositions from 1972's album Hosianna Mantra going forward. Additionally, Hosianna Mantra marked the growing exploration of "spiritual matters", inspired by both western and eastern religions, picking up a wider range of wind and string instruments, which were combined to convey a mystical aura that made their music spiritual and introspective. The European influence is "particularly evident on the album's later tracks such as 'Not High in Heaven', 'Kyrie', and 'Blessing'."

Fricke met Werner Herzog in 1967 and the following year played a cameo role in Herzog's movie Signs of Life. The band contributed soundtracks to several of Herzog's films, including Aguirre, the Wrath of God, as well as Nosferatu: Phantom der Nacht, Fitzcarraldo, Cobra Verde, Heart of Glass and The Enigma of Kaspar Hauser. Fricke made an episodic appearance in The Enigma of Kaspar Hauser.

Florian Fricke, the band's creative powerhouse, died in Munich on 29 December 2001, and the group essentially disbanded.

== Style and legacy ==
In 1973, Conny Veit elaborated on the spiritual component of the group's music:

"I refrain from the classification 'church music', although I think it is entirely possible and appropriate that Hosianna Mantra be used as music for church. I realized this record was actually about something else for me. With the means at my disposal I wanted to grasp the original Christian being and feeling in order to convey the correctness of elementary truths in the Christian word. Not as a preacher, but as someone for whom archaic ways of life seem more valuable and right than our own contemporary culture."

Popol Vuh influenced many other European bands with their uniquely soft but elaborate instrumentation, which took inspiration from the music of Tibet, Africa, and pre-Columbian America. With music sometimes described as "ethereal", they created soundscapes through psychedelic walls of sound, and are regarded as precursors of contemporary world music, as well as of new age and ambient.

In October 2003 German composer Klaus Schulze wrote:

"Florian was and remains an important forerunner of contemporary ethnic and religious music. He chose electronic music and his big Moog to free himself from the restraints of traditional music, but soon discovered that he didn't get a lot out of it and opted for the acoustic path instead. Here, he went on to create a new world, which Werner Herzog loves so much, transforming the thought patterns of electronic music into the language of acoustic ethno music."

== Discography ==
1. Affenstunde (1970)
2. In den Gärten Pharaos (1971)
3. Hosianna Mantra (1972)
4. Seligpreisung (1973)
5. Einsjäger und Siebenjäger (1974)
6. Das Hohelied Salomos (1975)
7. Aguirre (1975)
8. Letzte Tage – Letzte Nächte (1976)
9. Herz aus Glas (1977)
10. Brüder des Schattens – Söhne des Lichts (1978)
11. Nosferatu (1978)
12. Die Nacht der Seele (1979)
13. Sei still, wisse ICH BIN (1981)
14. Agape – Agape (1983)
15. Spirit of Peace (1985)
16. Cobra Verde (1987)
17. For You and Me (1991)
18. City Raga (1995)
19. Shepherd's Symphony – Hirtensymphonie (1997)
20. Messa di Orfeo (1999)

=== Florian Fricke solo albums ===
- Die Erde und ich sind Eins (1983) – limited private pressing
- Florian Fricke Plays Mozart (1992) – featuring Fricke on piano playing Mozart compositions

=== Compilations ===
Note: there are two distinct issues of the compilation Best of Popol Vuh – Werner Herzog. These are distinct from The Best Soundtracks from Werner Herzog Films, though the selections of tracks overlap.

- Perlenklänge: The Best of Popol Vuh (1976) – Ohr / Pilz / Kosmische Musik compilation
- Tantric Songs (1981) – featuring tracks from Die Nacht der Seele and Brüder des Schattens – Söhne des Lichts
- Fitzcarraldo (1982) – soundtrack featuring four previously released Popol Vuh compositions besides opera and traditional music
- In the Gardens of Pharao / Aguirre (1983)
- Gesang der Gesänge (1988)
- Best of Popol Vuh – Werner Herzog (1989 with 14 tracks; reissued 1993 with only 10 tracks)
- Florian Fricke (1991) – featuring tracks from Herz aus Glas (retitled) and Brüder des Schattens – Söhne des Lichts
- The Best Soundtracks from Werner Herzog Films (1991, 8 tracks)
- Best of Popol Vuh from the Films of Werner Herzog (1992, 10 tracks), contains one track (titled "We Are Aware of the Misery") from the Herzog film The Dark Glow of the Mountains, which was previously unreleased
- Sing, for Song Drives Away the Wolves (1993) – remix album
- Movie Music (1994) – 3-CD set: Aguirre, Herz aus Glas, Nosferatu
- Nicht Hoch Im Himmel (1998)
- Future Sound Experience (2002) – remix album recorded in 1993 (according to its booklet) and released after Florian Fricke's death
- 70's Progressive (2006) – SPV compilation
- On the Way to Himalaya (2006) – 3-CD set: Brüder des Schattens – Söhne des Lichts, Spirit of Peace, Die Nacht der Seele
- The Werner Herzog Soundtracks Box set (2011)
- Revisited & Remixed (1970–1999) (2011)

=== Unauthorized album ===
- Yoga (1976) – recorded by Florian Fricke with Indian musicians
