= Perfect Sound Forever (magazine) =

Online music magazine

Perfect Sound Forever (established 1995) is one of the longest-running online-only music magazines. Along with Michael Goldberg's Addicted to Noise (est. 1994), it is one of the first publications to post recurring, feature-length music journalism online.

== History ==
Perfect Sound Forever's origins trace back to New York freelance writer Jason Gross, who began a now-defunct website called Furious Green Thoughts (from the noted Noam Chomsky quote). The site was first hosted by the pre-Earthlink internet service provider Pipeline, and included articles covering politics, music and fiction. The name Perfect Sound Forever (PSF) originated in an early 1980s ad campaign about the first generation of CDs, promising the highest fidelity possible, and that the discs would outlive their owners. The same term was used as the title of an EP by the American band Pavement, released in 1991.

In 1995, Furious Green Thoughts was splintered into three sections, with the main title covering political (usually far-left) stories, "Assorted Realities" covering fiction and "Perfect Sound Forever" covering music. Laboring as a staff of one, Gross eventually folded Furious Green Thoughts and Assorted Realities, simplifying the zine's name to Perfect Sound Forever by the mid-1990s. PSF also moved from monthly to bi-monthly publication, with approximately 14 articles in each issue.

Apart from occasional review columns, the 'zine concentrates on in-depth op-ed pieces, think pieces and interviews, usually of obscure, often reclusive artists. Its design is a dark background with white lettering, which some readers have complained is difficult to wade through. However, a 2004 redesign prompted many calls for reversion to the original code.

PSF's longest running column is Marc Phillips' "The Vinyl Anachronist" (which began in 1998). The site's most popular article remains "Bad Songs of the Seventies", which was written in 1995 and still generates hate-mail. A 1997 interview with Tuli Kupferberg was also cited in his obituary in The New York Times.

Former Pitchfork editor Chris Ott briefly worked as co-editor, and put together a redesign of Perfect Sound Forever that ran in late 2004 and early 2005. Current editors include founder Jason Gross, Robin Cook (who is also a production editor at Kensington Books), Al Spicer (former editor at Time Out London) and Kurt Wildermuth (an editor at W. W. Norton & Company). Ken Cox, who also worked as a reverend and professor, was also an editor; he died in March 2010. Gross also contributes an annual report on the state of music criticism to RockCritics.com and PopMatters.

PSF has also published work by several noted writers including Robert Christgau (who also edited the June 2008 issue), Jim DeRogatis, Vivien Goldman, Barney Hoskyns, Dave Marsh, Richard Meltzer, Simon Reynolds, David Toop and Richie Unterberger. There have also been articles, stories and literature from several musicians including Colin Newman (Wire), Peter Stampfel (the Holy Modal Rounders), Lydia Lunch, Chris Cutler, Alan Bishop (Sun City Girls), Holger Czukay (Can), DJ Spooky, Richard Hell, Moondog and Tuli Kupferberg (the Fugs).

== Reissues ==
Several of PSF's articles have led to reissues of the artists involved, including:

- Delta 5
- Essential Logic
- DNA
- Kleenex
- Oh-OK
