= Florian Fricke =

German musician (1944–2001)

- Fricke (centre) in the studio with Popol Vuh, ca. early 1970s

Background information
- Born: 23 February 1944; Lindau am Bodensee, Germany
- Died: 29 December 2001 (aged 57) Munich, Germany
- Genres: Krautrock; electronic; progressive rock; psychedelic rock; art rock; ambient; neo-classical; world music; new-age
- Occupation: Musician
- Instruments: Piano; synthesizer; keyboards
- Labels: Liberty; Pilz; Kosmische Musik; United Artists; PDU; Milan Records; Spalax; Ohr; Brain

Florian Fricke (23 February 1944 – 29 December 2001) was a German musician who started his professional career with electronic music, using the Moog synthesizer, and was a founding member of the Krautrock band Popol Vuh.

== Early life ==
Born on 23 February 1944, to an affluent Bavarian family, on the Lindau island of Lake Constance, Germany, situated where Germany, Switzerland, and Austria meet, Fricke started playing the piano as a child. He studied piano, composition, and conducting at Conservatories in Freiburg and Munich.

While in Munich, at 18, he began exploring avant-garde music such as free jazz. At around that age, he also shot a few short films.

== Career ==
=== Werner Herzog films and soundtracks ===
In the early 1960s, Fricke befriended future film director Werner Herzog. In the 5th issue of David Elliott's fanzine Neumusik, in 1981, Garry Scott related that the two young men "shared similar ideas and beliefs" and "dreamed of changing the world."

Fricke appeared in the small part of an unnamed pianist in the 1968 movie Signs of Life, Herzog's first, which was shot in Greece. Fricke subsequently edited the soundtracks of several Herzog's movies, among which were Nosferatu: Phantom of the Night, starring Klaus Kinski and Bruno Ganz; Aguirre, the Wrath of God; and, Heart of Glass. In Herzog's 1974 film The Enigma of Kaspar Hauser, Fricke made a cameo appearance as a blind pianist named "Florian."

=== Popol Vuh ===
One day, in the 1960s, while in the Munich University's library, Fricke and Herzog came across a religious book of the Maya, titled Popol Vuh. In 1969, Fricke co-founded the eponymous band along with sound designer Frank Fiedler and percussionist Holger Trülzsch. He was one of the first musicians to own and use a Moog III synthesizer, with which he recorded Popol Vuh's first two albums Affenstunde ("Hour of the Monkey") and In den Gärten Pharaos ("In Pharaohs' Gardens").

Fricke is considered a "pioneer of electronic music." Critic Mark Lager found the LP In den Gärten Pharaos "otherwordly" and "the most mind-blowing mystical experience." In 1972, Tangerine Dream’s founder Edgar Froese, "intrigued by Florian Fricke’s music," invited him to play in the opening track “Birth of Liquid Plejades” of the band's LP Zeit ("Time").

Although initially in his musical career, Fricke had accepted the moniker of kosmische Musik that had been applied by critics and fellow artists to his mostly instrumental compositions, since he regarded his music as being "fundamentally" far from the "space sounds" produced at the time, he came to entirely reject the term as soon as by the early 1970s. He declared that the "beautiful and honest way" for composers would be to free their minds without the use of technology. Around the same time, he repudiated the use of the Moog synthesizer and, in December 1975, he sold his Moog to electronic-music pioneer, composer, and musician Klaus Schulze. From then on, he concentrated mainly though not exclusively on acoustic music.

=== Solo work and collaborations ===
Fricke was a Marxist in his youth. In later years, he moved beyond Marxism and saw himself as a representative of an "anti-capitalist, universalist, and anti-consumerist variant of Christianity." He wanted to combine a non-denominational form of the Christian religion with Hindu terminology, though he never laid claims to some "inner wisdom." In the years 1973-74, Fricke, together with guitarist Danny Fichelscher, was a member of former Popol Vuh guitarist Conny Veit's band Gila.

In 1992, he recorded an album of Mozart compositions.

== Film work ==
In 1970, Fricke worked as a film critic for Süddeutsche Zeitung and Spiegel.

Together with former Popol Vuh member Frank Fiedler, a competent cameraman, Fricke shot a series of films of "spiritual inspiration" in the Sinai desert, and also in Israel, Lebanon, Mesopotamia, Morocco, Afghanistan, Tibet, and Nepal.

== Personal life ==
Beginning in the 1970s, Fricke started working on musicotherapy. He claimed to have developed an original form of therapy he called the "Alphabet of the Body."

== Death ==
Fricke died of a stroke in Munich on 29 December 2001, at the age of 57.

== Legacy ==
In October 2003, electronic-music pioneer Klaus Schulze wrote in the booklet in the soon-to be-re-released Hosianna Mantra LP the following:

Florian was and remains an important forerunner of contemporary ethnic and religious music. He chose electronic music and his big Moog to free himself from the restraints of traditional music, but soon discovered that he didn't get a lot out of it and opted for the acoustic path instead. Here, he went on to create a new world, which Werner Herzog loves so much, transforming the thought patterns of electronic music into the language of acoustic ethnomusic.

Between 2004 and 2006, the German SPV record label re-released almost all Popol Vuh albums, along with bonus tracks, including the early Moog Synthesizer records and the complete Werner Herzog soundtracks. The re-release was remastered and curated by Fricke's widow Bettina von Waldthausen and son Johannes.

== Albums ==
For Fricke's LPs with Popol Vuh, see Popol Vuh albums

- Die Erde und ich sind Eins ("The Earth and I Are One"), limited, private pressing (1983)
- Florian Fricke Plays Mozart, on the piano (1992)
