= Auf leisen Sohlen =

Compilation album by Roedelius
- Released: 1984
- Recorded: 1973–1982
- Genre: Electronic, Kosmische musik, new age, ambient
- Length: 39:57
- Label: Sky Records
- Producer: Hans-Joachim Roedelius, Peter Baumann, Conny Plank

Roedelius chronology
Wasser im Wind (1982)	Auf leisen Sohlen (1984)	Geschenk des Augenblicks - Gift of the Moment (1984)

Professional ratings
Review scores
Source	Rating
Allmusic	3/5 stars

Auf leisen Sohlen (German for "Silent Footsteps") is a compilation by Sky Records of works by German keyboardist Hans-Joachim Roedelius, best known for his work with Cluster, Harmonia, and Aquarello. It is subtitled Das Beste von H. J. Roedelius (1978 - 1982) and includes tracks from seven of the eight albums he recorded for Sky Records during that period. All music included in this collection was composed by Hans-Joachim Roedelius.

Auf leisen Sohlen was originally released as a vinyl LP by Sky Records in 1984. It was reissued on CD by Sky Records in 1994.

== Track listing ==
1. "Johanneslust" - 4:50 (from: "Durch die Wüste", 1978)
2. "Dein Antlitz" - 3:50 (from: "Lustwandel", 1981)
3. "Lustwandel" - 3:52 (from: "Lustwandel", 1981)
4. "Flieg', Vogel, Fliege" - 2:33 (from: "Flieg' Vogel fliege", 1982)
5. "Auf und Davon" - 4:36 (from: "Flieg' Vogel fliege", 1982)
6. "Herold" - 3:57 (from: "Selbstportrait", 1979)
7. "Auf leisen Sohlen" - 3:47 (from: "Wenn der Südwind Weht", 1981)
8. "Gewiss" - 4:42 (from: "Selbstportrait II", 1980)
9. "Besucher Im Traum" - 3:51 (from: "Offene Türen", 1982)
10. "Auf der Höhe" - 3:59 (from: "Offene Türen", 1982)

== Personnel ==
- Hans-Joachim Roedelius - Producer, all titles by, performer
- Conny Plank - Producer ("Johanneslust")
- Peter Baumann - Producer ("Dein Antlitz" and "Lustwandel")
- Ragnit von Mosch - Cover Painting
