= Wasser im Wind =

Studio album by Hans-Joachim Roedelius
- Released: 1982
- Recorded: 1981–1982
- Genre: Kosmische musik, new age, electronic, ambient
- Length: 38:25
- Label: Schallter
- Producer: Hans-Joachim Roedelius

Hans-Joachim Roedelius chronology
Flieg' Vogel Fliege (1982)	Wasser im Wind (1982)	Auf leisen Sohlen (1984)

Wasser im Wind (German for "Water in the Wind") is the tenth solo album by keyboardist Hans-Joachim Roedelius, best known for his work with Cluster, Harmonia, and Aquarello.

== Recording and release ==
Wasser im Wind was recorded in 1981 at Roedelius' home studio and completed at Erpelstudio, Vienna, Austria in March, 1982. It was released by the Schallter label on vinyl in 1982. Wasser im Wind was the first Roedelius album released by a label other than Sky Records since his second solo album, Jardin Au Fou, in 1979. It was reissued on CD, 180-gram vinyl LP and digital download by the bureau b label on August 12, 2011.

== Track listing ==
1. "Der Ruf aus der Ferne" - 5:16
2. "Am Stadtrand" - 5:13
3. "Zwei sind eins" - 3:26
4. "Auf des Tigers Spur" - 3:10
5. "Immergrün" - 2:52
6. "Wasser im Wind" - 5:20
7. "Kundmachung" - 2:45
8. "Heilsamer Brunnen" - 9:00
9. "Fenster Im Schnee" - 4:43

== Personnel ==
- Hans-Joachim Roedelius - Composer, producer, synthesizer, percussion, piano, voice, sounds
- Alexander Czjzek - Saxophone, artwork, composer on "Am Stadtrand", "Immergrün" and "Wasser im Wind"
- Eric Spitzer-Marlyn - Guitar, bass guitar, engineer, composer on "Der Ruf aus der Ferne", "Auf des Tigers Spur" and "Heilsamer Brunnen"
- Christine Roedelius - Photography

=== Additional personnel, 2011 reissue ===
- Gunther Buskies - Reissue producer
- Thomas Worthmann - Reissue producer
- Willem Makkee - Digital remastering
- Asmus Tietchens - Liner notes
- Gareth Davies - Liner notes translation
- Kerstin Holzwarth - Reissue layout

== Other resources ==
- Album liner Notes
