= Selbstportrait – Vol. II =

Selbstportrait - Vol. II

Studio album by Hans-Joachim Roedelius
- Released: 1980
- Recorded: 1973–1979
- Genre: Kosmische musik, new-age, electronic, ambient
- Length: 40:43
- Label: Sky
- Producer: Hans-Joachim Roedelius

Hans-Joachim Roedelius chronology
Selbstportrait (1979)	Selbstportrait - Vol. II (1980)	Selbstportrait Vol. III "Reise durch Arcadien" (1980)

Selbstportrait – Vol. II is the fourth solo album by German keyboardist Hans-Joachim Roedelius, best known for his work with Cluster, Harmonia and Aquarello. The title is German for "Self Portrait - Vol. II", a title which clearly reflects the gentle, introspective nature of this album of ambient or new-age music. It is the second of seven albums in Roedelius' Selbsportrait series of recordings. The album is subtitled "Freundliche Musik", German for "Friendly Music".

== Recording and Release ==
Like Selbstportrait before it, Selbstportrait – Vol. II was recorded by Roedelius at his home in Forst, in the Weser Uplands of West Germany and in Austria between various Cluster sessions from 1973 until 1979, so much of the music actually predates Roedelius' first two solo albums: Durch Die Wüste and Jardin Au Fou. Selbstportrait – Vol. II was released by Sky Records in 1980.

Seven of the 11 tracks on Selbstportrait – Vol. II and the entire previous album, Selbstportrait were released as a single CD titled Selbstportrait I & II by Sky Records in 1996. The tracks omitted from the combined reissue are "Signal", "Schönheitsflecken", "Grundlsee", and "Regunwurm". The entire album was reissued separately on both 180-gram vinyl LP and CD by the Bureau-B label on December 3, 2010.

== Track listing ==
1. "Signal" – 0:10
2. "Gewiß" – 4:46
3. "Aufbruch" – 3:45
4. "Schönheitsflecken" – 3:14
5. "Alle Jahre wieder" – 4:43 (Note: Unrelated to the Christmas carol "Alle Jahre wieder")
6. "Übern Fluß" – 3:45
7. "Tee für die Geisha" – 5:25
8. "Kichererbsen" – 2:30
9. "Grundlsee" – 4:27
10. "Regenwurm" – 4:04
11. "Thronfloge" – 3:44
12. "Signal" – 0:10

== Personnel ==
- Hans-Joachim Roedelius – Piano, keyboards, producer
