= Offene Türen =

Studio album by Hans-Joachim Roedelius
- Released: 1982
- Genre: Kosmische musik, new-age, electronic, ambient
- Length: 39:41
- Label: Sky Records
- Producer: Hans-Joachim Roedelius

Hans-Joachim Roedelius chronology
Wenn Der Südwind Weht (1981)	Offene Türen (1982)	Flieg' Vogel Fliege (1982)

Offene Türen (German for "Opening Doors") is the eighth solo album by German keyboardist Hans-Joachim Roedelius, best known for his work with Cluster, Harmonia, and Aquarello. The music of Offene Türen is more avant-garde than other Roedelius solo albums of the 1970s and 1980s. It can best be compared to Cluster's Curiosum which was released by Sky Records the previous year.

== Recording and release ==
Offene Türen was recorded at Roedelius' home studio and at Erpelstudio, Vienna, Austria. The album was first released by Sky Records on vinyl LP in 1982. Two tracks, "Besucher Im Traum" and "Auf der Höhe", were included on the Sky Records compilation Auf leisen Sohlen - Das Beste Von H. J. Roedelius (1978 - 1982) which was first released on LP in 1984 and reissued on CD in 1994. This represented the first time any tracks from Offene Türen appeared on CD. The complete album was released on CD by Nepenthe Music in December, 2009. The reissue includes liner notes by Stephen Iliffe, the author of Roedelius' biography, Painting with Sound: The Life and Music of Hans-Joachim Roedelius and was remastered by Robert Rich.

== Reception ==
Professional ratings
Review scores
Source	Rating
Allmusic	4/5 stars

The review for the Babyblaue Prog website, written (in German) by Jochen Rindfrey, describes the album (in part):

"...Offene Türen shows a more avant-garde side. The pieces in their brevity are often sketchy, acting as sound miniatures [...] The instrumentation is minimal with origins in the Selbstportrait series, with sound effects backing the Farfisa organ. There are also songs like 'Allemande,' which sounds a bit like a burlesque folk dance, or 'Abenteuerliche Begegnung' and 'Besucher im Traum' which resemble in their romantic mood more typical Roedelius music."

== Track listing ==
1. "Abenteuerliche Begegnung" - 3:35
2. "Besucher Im Traum" - 3:58
3. "Mit offenem Visier" -3:27
4. "Vom Osten her" - 4:27
5. "Der Sieger" - 2:08
6. "Auf der Höhe" - 3:58
7. "Allemande" - 2:10
8. "Spiegelung" - 2:44
9. "Husche" - 2:36
10. "Stufe um Stufe" - 3:05
11. "Zeremoniell" - 3:25
12. "Wende" - 4:08

== Personnel ==
- Hans-Joachim Roedelius - Synthesizer, keyboards, vocals, music by, producer
- Eric Spitzer-Marlyn - Engineer
- Robert Rich - CD reissue remastering
- Tim Fisher - Artwork (CD reissue)
