= Zwei-Osterei =

Studio album by Kluster
- Released: 1971
- Recorded: 1970
- Genre: Krautrock; kosmische; experimental
- Length: 44:52
- Label: Schwann
- Producer: Oskar Gottlieb Blarr.

Kluster chronology
Klopfzeichen (1970)	Zwei-Osterei (1971)	Eruption (1971)

Professional ratings
Review scores
Source	Rating
Allmusic	3/5 stars

Zwei-Osterei is the second full-length album by German experimental music trio Kluster. The album title translates to English as "Two - Easter egg".

Zwei-Osterei was recorded on February 23, 1970 at Rhenus-Studio, Gordorf, Germany. Zwei-Osterei was released in 1971 on the Schwann label, with a plastic embossed cover, including two multi fold-out inserts. Only 300 copies of the original LP were pressed and sold.

The trio played piano, guitar, cello, flute, percussion, and organ, all of which were electronically treated by engineer Konrad (Conny) Plank. According to Conrad Schnitzler in a 1980 interview he gave to David Elliott an advertisement by an organist interested in new music led to the recording session being sponsored by a church. Kluster was required to add religious text to the first side of the album to obtain this sponsorship. The text was read by Manfred Paethe. The text was written by Rudolf Bohren, Kurt Marti, Dorothee Solle, Rudolf Otto Weimer, Lisolette Rauner and Hilde Domin. Schnitzler described the text: "If you don't understand the German words, it sounds better. [...] If you know what it means, you'll find it terrible."

CD copies of Zwei-Osterei first appeared in record stores in 1994. These early copies were issued by the dubious reportedly Luxembourg-based Germanofon label, who produced numerous unauthorized and illegal (bootleg) Krautrock reissues and managed to get them into mainstream distribution. The Germanofon CDs were transcribed from well worn vinyl and have inferior sound quality. These bootlegs also incorrectly named the band Cluster.

The album was first legally reissued on the U.S. based Hypnotic label in 1996 with new cover art and a sticker touting Cluster and Conrad Schnitzler's previous membership in Tangerine Dream. This CD reissue also contains a 15-minute-long bonus track from the 1980 Cluster & Farnbauer release Live In Vienna. The album was also reissued on the Japanese Captain Trip label on April 20, 2007 as a 450 copy limited CD edition with an adaption of the original cover art and a bonus track by Schnitzler's later band Eruption, "Cold Winter", from their 1971 sessions.

In 2012 Bureau-B released another reissue on CD as well as on 180gr vinyl. The original cover art-work was adapted, new liner-notes provided by Asmus Tietchens.

== Track listing ==
1. "Electric Music & Text" – 22:50
2. "Kluster 4" – 22:09

== Personnel ==
- Conrad Schnitzler
- Hans-Joachim Roedelius
- Dieter Moebius
- Manfred Paethe – Voice, Track 1
- Conrad Plank – Engineer
- Oskar Gottlieb Blarr – Producer
