= Klopfzeichen =

Studio album by Kluster
- Released: November 1970
- Recorded: 21 December 1969
- Genre: Krautrock; experimental; industrial
- Length: 45:05
- Label: Schwann
- Producer: Oskar Gottlieb Blarr

Kluster chronology
Klopfzeichen (1970)	Zwei-Osterei (1971)

Professional ratings
Review scores
Source	Rating
Allmusic	3/5 stars

Klopfzeichen is the debut full-length album by German experimental music trio Kluster.

Klopfzeichen was recorded on 21 December 1969 at Rhenus-Studio, Gordorf, Germany. Liner notes on the CD reissue on the Hypnotic label as well as some websites place the recording date precisely one year later in 1970. This is incorrect as it would place the recording after the initial release date. In addition Kluster founder Conrad Schnitzler stated in interviews that the recordings took place during the same period as the first Tangerine Dream album, Electronic Meditation, which occurred in late 1969.

Klopfzeichen was released in November 1970 on the Schwann label. With a plastic embossed cover, including two multi fold-out inserts. Only 300 copies of the original LP were pressed and sold.

The album was first reissued by Schwann in 1980 – with new cover art and a sticker touting Cluster and Conrad Schnitzler's previous membership in Tangerine Dream – and then on the U.S.-based Hypnotic label in 1996. This CD reissue also contains a nearly 16-minute-long bonus track from the 1980 Cluster & Farnbauer release Live In Vienna.

The album was again reissued on the Japanese Captain Trip label on April 20, 2007 as a 450 copy limited CD edition with an adaption of the original cover art-work and a bonus track by Eruption, "Black Spring", from their 1971 sessions.

In 2012 Bureau-B released another reissue on CD as well as on 180gr vinyl. The original cover art-work was adapted, new liner-notes provided by Asmus Tietchens.

== Track listing ==
1. "Kluster 1" - 24:00
2. "Kluster 2" - 21:51

== Personnel ==
- Conrad Schnitzler
- Hans-Joachim Roedelius
- Dieter Moebius
- Christa Runge - Voice, Track 1
- Conrad Plank - Engineer
- J. Liebig - Engineer
- Oskar Gottlieb Blarr - Producer
