= Selbstportrait Vol. III "Reise durch Arcadien" =

Studio album by Hans-Joachim Roedelius
- Released: 1980
- Recorded: 1973–1980
- Genre: Kosmische musik, new-age, electronic, ambient
- Label: Sky
- Producer: Hans-Joachim Roedelius

Hans-Joachim Roedelius chronology
Selbstportrait - Vol. II (1979)	Selbstportrait Vol. III "Reise durch Arcadien" (1980)	Lustwandel (1981)

Selbstportrait Vol. III "Reise durch Arcadien" is the fifth solo album by German keyboardist Hans-Joachim Roedelius, best known for his work with Cluster, Harmonia, and Aquarello. It is the third of seven albums in Roedelius' Selbsportrait series of recordings. Selbstportrait Vol. III "Reise durch Arcadien" was recorded in Forst, Germany until 1978 and in Blumau, Austria between 1978 and February, 1980. The album was released by Sky Records in 1980.

Much like the previous volumes of the Selbstportrait series the music can be described as ambient or new age with gentle melodies.

== Track listing ==
1. "Sonntags" - 3:45
2. "Geburtstag" - 1:50
3. "Fieber" - 6:06
4. "Hochzeit" - 3:05
5. "Geradewohl" - 3:50
6. "Erinnerung" - 3:25
7. "Zuversicht" - 11:05
8. "Stimmung" - 9:05

== Personnel ==
- Hans-Joachim Roedelius - piano, keyboards
