= Flieg' Vogel Fliege =

Flieg 'Vogel fliege

Studio album by Hans-Joachim Roedelius
- Released: 1982
- Genre: Kosmische musik, new age, electronic, ambient
- Length: 39:12
- Label: Sky Records
- Producer: Hans-Joachim Roedelius

Hans-Joachim Roedelius chronology
| Offene Türen (1982) | Flieg 'Vogel fliege (1982) | Wasser im Wind (1982) |

Flieg' Vogel fliege (German for "Fly Bird Fly") is the ninth solo album by keyboardist Hans-Joachim Roedelius, best known for his work with Cluster, Harmonia, and Aquarello. According to Roedelius biographer Stephen Iliffe this album is also titled Selbstportrait IV, but that name does not appear on the album sleeve or label. Flieg' Vogel fliege was recorded at Roedelius' home studio and completed at Erpelstudio, Vienna, Austria. Flieg' Vogel fliege was released by Sky Records on vinyl in 1982. Flieg' Vogel fliege was the final album Roedelius recorded for Sky Records.

Two tracks, "Flieg Vogel fliege" and "Auf auf und davon" (retitled as "Auf und Davon") were included on the Sky Records compilation Auf leisen Sohlen - Das Beste Von H. J. Roedelius (1978 - 1982) which was first released on LP in 1984 and reissued on CD in 1994. This represented the first time any tracks from Flieg' Vogel fliege appeared on CD. The complete album was reissued by the Bureau B label in 2014.

Like the previous three Selbstportrait recordings, the music of Flieg' Vogel fliege is largely gentle and introspective ambient or new age music.

== Track listing ==
1. "Über Berg und Tal " - 4:15
2. "Klares Wasser" - 2:25
3. "Bär im Honig" - 2:50
4. "Flieg Vogel fliege" - 4:00
5. "Kleines Glück" - 1:40
6. "Lange Weile" - 1:10
7. "Oh, du grüne Neune" - 4:40
8. "Meilensteine" - 3:50
9. "Salzpflaumen" - 1:45
10. "Auf auf und davon" - 4:37
11. "Wanderung" - 10:00

== Personnel ==
- Hans-Joachim Roedelius - Music, performance, recording, producer, cover
- Rosa Roedelius - Cover image
