= Wenn Der Südwind Weht =

Studio album by Hans-Joachim Roedelius
- Released: 1981
- Genre: Kosmische musik, new age, electronic, ambient
- Length: 40:51
- Label: Sky Records
- Producer: Hans-Joachim Roedelius

Hans-Joachim Roedelius chronology
Lustwandel (1981)	Wenn Der Südwind Weht (1981)	Offene Türen (1982)

Professional ratings
Review scores
Source	Rating
Allmusic	4.5/5 stars

Wenn Der Südwind Weht is the seventh solo album by German keyboardist Hans-Joachim Roedelius, best known for his work with Cluster, Harmonia, and Aquarello. All the pieces on the album were composed by Roedelius. It was released by Sky Records in 1981 and has been reissued on CD by Sky Records in Germany by the Gyroscope label in the United States in 1996. The Bureau-B label reissued Wenn Der Südwind Weht in the European Union on both CD and 180 gram vinyl LP in 2010.

The music of Wenn Der Südwind Weht is a series of ambient pieces for synthesizer and organ. Joe McGlinchey, writing a review for the Ground and Sky website, describes the music, in part:

These are mostly made up of a percussive bed of keyboards that gently pulsate in an obsessive fashion, while over these a melodic lead solos lackadaisically. This album is one of Roedelius' more homogeneous in terms of both texture and composition. Almost all of the pieces on here remain quite static in development, so what you hear in the first 20 seconds of a piece is most likely what you will be hearing by the closing 20 seconds.

The title is German for "When the South Wind Blows."

== Track listing ==
1. "Wenn der Südwind weht" - 4:11
2. "Veilchenwurzeln " - 5:01
3. "Mein Freund Farouk " - 4:14
4. "Mutee" - 4:11
5. "Freudentanz" - 2:00
6. "Goldregen" - 1:00
7. "Auf leisen Sohlen " - 3:47
8. "Saumpfad" - 8:30
9. "Sonnengeflecht" - 3:25
10. "Felix Austria" - 4:21

== Personnel ==
- Hans-Joachim Roedelius - Synthesizer, keyboards, music by, interpretation, recorded by, producer, cover
