= Geschenk des Augenblicks – Gift of the Moment =

Geschenk des Augenblicks - Gift of the Moment

Studio album by Hans-Joachim Roedelius
- Released: 1984
- Recorded: 1983
- Genre: Neoclassical new age, new age, ambient
- Length: 47:25
- Label: Editions EG
- Producer: Hans-Joachim Roedelius

Hans-Joachim Roedelius chronology
Auf leisen Sohlen (1984)	Geschenk des Augenblicks - Gift of the Moment (1984)	Wie das Wispern des Windes (1986)

Geschenk des Augenblicks – Gift of the Moment is the eleventh solo album by German keyboardist Hans-Joachim Roedelius, best known for his work with Cluster, Harmonia, and Aquarello.

== Recording and Release ==
The piano music which is central to this album was recorded in Roedelius' home studio. Further instrumentation, transfer to multitrack and first mixing took place in late February, 1983 at Lux Mundi studio in Rotterdam, the Netherlands. The pieces were completed at Roedelius' home with the Erpel Portable Studio the following May. The album was finished in October, 1983 at The Hit Box Studio, Vienna, Austria. It was released by Editions EG in 1984 and first reissued on by Editions EG on CD in 1991. It has subsequently been reissued jointly by E.G.Records and Virgin Records in 1997 and was reissued again on both CD and 180-gram vinyl LP by the Bureau B label on January 17, 2011. It is Roedelius' best selling solo album to date.

All the music of Geschenk des Augenblicks - Gift of the Moment was composed or co-composed by Roedelius. "Adieu Quichotte", "Troubador", "Gefundene Zeit (Time Regained) " and "Das Sanfte (Mellowness)" were co-composed by Arjen Uittenbogaard, who plays cello on the album. "Wurzeln Des Glücks (Roots Of Joy)" was co-composed by violinist Tjitse Letterie.

== Music ==
Roedelius biographer Stephen Iliffe described the music of Geschenk des Augenblicks - Gift of the Moment and the effect of the move to Editions EG in his book Painting with Sound: The life and music of Hans-Joachim Roedelius:

His music has grown a bit too sweet (read New Age!)" complained Dag Erik Asbjornsen. But EG Records gives him a wider audience of folk unaware of the Cluster legend, not to mention an independent chart placing between Nick Cave and The Smiths.

The review on the Piccadilly Records website talks about Roedelius' move away from electronic music on this album:

If Lustwandel and Jardin au Fou had seen the process set in motion, this was the album that completed the transition. [...] Roedelius focused on the grand piano, sometimes accompanied by a cello, violin and guitar. Distant echoes of a not so distant musical past could only be detected in the occasional appearance of sparse chords played on a polyphonic synthesizer. The album wore a veil of delicate melancholy: no vibrant folk dances, no colourful carousels, no cheerful melodies.

== Track listing ==
1. "Geschenk des Augenblicks (Gift of the Moment)" - 4:19
2. "Adieu Quichotte" - 5:46
3. "Troubadour" - 5:16
4. "Kleine Blume Irgendwo (Little Flower Somewhere)" - 2:13
5. "Ohn' Unterlaß (Continuously)" - 3:50
6. "Gefundene Zeit (Time Regained)" - 2:00
7. "Sehnsucht ich will dich Lassen (To be free of Yearning)" - 5:48
8. "Das Sanfte (Mellowness)" - 3:43
9. "Tag für Tag (Day by Day)" - 4:30
10. "Zu Füßen der Berge am Ufer des Sees (At the foot of the mountain by the lakeside)" - 6:35
11. "Wurzeln des Glücks (Roots of Joy)" - 3:25

== Personnel ==
- Hans-Joachim Roedelius - Grand piano, acoustic and electric guitars, electric bass, accordion, electronic sounds with CP 33 vocoder and Korg Poly 61 synthesizer, producer, cover
- Arjen Uittenbogaard - Cello
- Tjitse Letterie - Violin
- Coen De Neef - Recording engineer (Lux Mondi studio)
- Eric Spitzer-Marlyn - Recording engineer (The Hit Box Studio)
