= Selbstportrait =

Studio album by Hans-Joachim Roedelius
- Released: 1979
- Recorded: 1974–1977
- Genre: Kosmische musik, new-age, electronic, ambient
- Length: 45:50
- Label: Sky
- Producer: Hans-Joachim Roedelius

Hans-Joachim Roedelius chronology
Jardin Au Fou (1979)	Selbstportrait (1979)	Selbstportrait - Vol. II (1980)

Selbstportrait is the third solo album by German keyboardist Hans-Joachim Roedelius, best known for his work with Cluster, Harmonia, and Aquarello. The title is German for "Self Portrait", a title meant to reflect the gentle, introspective nature of the ambient and new-age music of the album. The original Sky Records release was subtitled Teil 1 Sanfte Musik, German for "Part 1, Soft Music."

Selbstportrait was recorded by Roedelius at his home in Forst, in the Weser Uplands of West Germany between various Cluster sessions from 1973 until 1977 on his ReVox A77 reel to reel. The music actually predates the two previously released solo albums: Durch Die Wüste and Jardin Au Fou. The final mix was completed at Gorilla Studio in Vienna, Austria at the end of April, 1979, with the exception of "Prinzregent" which was edited in Conny's Studio (owned by Conny Plank) in 1976. Selbstportrait was originally released by Sky Records in 1979. Phillipe Blache, writing the review for Prog Archives, describes the album, in part: "The music in itself is another exploration in electronic, pre-ambient 'picture' music but really orientated to the most 'mainstream' side of it."

Selbstportrait and seven of 11 tracks from the follow-up album Selbstportrait - Vol. II were reissued as a single CD by Sky Records in 1996 under the title Selbsportrait I & II. It was reissued in its original form on both LP and CD by the Bureau-B label on December 3, 2010.

In 2017, "Fabelwein" was featured in the film War Machine.

== Track listing ==
1. "In Liebe Dein" - 3:43
2. "Girlande" - 3:47
3. "Inselmoos" - 5:40
4. "Fabelwein" - 5:05
5. "Prinzregent" - 5:53
6. "Kamee" - 3:59
7. "Herold" - 3:32
8. "Halmharfe" - 3:24
9. "Arcona" - 5:05
10. "Staunen Im Fjord" - 3:33
11. "Minne" - 2:09

== Personnel ==
- Hans-Joachim Roedelius - Producer, composer, piano, keyboards
- Ernst Josef Seibl - Mixing (final cut)
- Jürgen Kraemer - Mixing on "Prinzregent"
- Udo Klemt - Mixing on "Prinzregent"
- Martha Roedelius that catg - Photography
