= Eruption (German band) =

German band

- Origin: Berlin, Germany
- Genres: Krautrock, electronic music, experimental music
- Years active: 1970–1972
- Past members: Conrad Schnitzler; Klaus Freudigmann; Wolfgang Seidel; Manuel Göttsching; Klaus Schulze; Hartmut Enke; Lutz Ulbrich; Michael Gunther; Dieter Serfas; Christa Runge

Eruption was a short-lived German krautrock or experimental music supergroup founded by former Tangerine Dream member and then current Kluster member Conrad Schnitzler.

== History ==
Eruption had a rapidly shifting lineup of musicians whom Schnitzler had met and played with at the Zodiak Free Arts Lab in the late 1960s and very early 1970s. At times Eruption included Klaus Schulze, Manuel Göttsching, and Hartmut Enke, who would go on to form the trio Ash Ra Tempel, Dieter Serfas of the jazz band Embryo, Michael Gunther and Lutz Ulbrich of Agitation Free, Christa Runge, who had read the text on the first Kluster album, as well as members of Amon Düül. Schnitzler and Schulze had also previously worked together as members of Tangerine Dream, both appearing on that band's first album, Electronic Meditation. Conrad Schnitzler described Eruption this way: "So anyway we got 10 musicians together; rock musicians, freejazz and electronic musicians - all together. We did some really interesting things."

David Keenan, writing for The Wire issue 261 in November, 2005 described the band: "Eruption was a multidisciplinary freeform ensemble put together by cellist, violinist and early electronic improvisor Conrad Schnitzler in 1970 as an adjunct to his work with Kraut behemoths Tangerine Dream and Kluster. They seem to have functioned more as a thinktank for the then explosive Krautrock scene than a straightforward gigging group, with a revolving membership..."

When Eruption went into the studio the lineup consisted of Schnitzler, Wolfgang Seidel, and Klaus Freudigmann. Freudigmann also recorded the final Kluster concert for Schnitzler, which was erroneously released under the title Kluster und Eruption. Schnitzler has stated in interviews that the band Eruption wasn't included at all on the Kluster album and that the album title should have simply been Eruption, a change that was finally made on the 1997 CD reissue by German label Marginal Talent. The album Eruption by Kluster is a different (live) album than the self-titled (studio) release by the band Eruption.

Eruption is notable more as an incubator for later, highly successful Krautrock bands and for the influence the various musicians had on one another than for their releases, which came 35 years after the music was recorded. The 1970 tapes which would become Eruption were shelved until 2005 when Qbico Records finally released the album. David Keenan describes the music as "much more punk than the group's links to such centres of kosmische boatfloat might suggest. The music starts out fairly fragmented, with sustained violin drones caught in a flux of scattershot percussion, short passages of silence and wowing effects."

Three previously unreleased tracks from 1971 have been included as bonus tracks on the 2007 CD reissues by the Japanese label Captain Trip Records of the first three Kluster albums:

- "Black Spring" appearing on the reissue of Klopfzeichen,
- "Cold Winter" appearing on the reissue of Zwei-Osterei and
- "Eruption Soundcheck", a short 4 1/2-minute 1971 soundcheck appearing on the 2006 reissue of Kluster's live album Eruption, now retitled "Schwarz" and credited to Conrad Schnitzler.

In 2008, Qbico released Live Action 1972 - Wuppertal, the first release of a live Eruption concert recording. In addition, a 1972 video by Kluster titled Elevator can be viewed from former member Wolfgang Seidel's MySpace page. The 6LP Qbico 1969-1972 album credited to "Kluster" is actually entirely Eruption recordings from 1970-1971. (The 8LP Vinyl-On-Demand album titled Klusterstrasse 69-72, implying that later Eruption tracks are included, actually only covers the years 1969-1970 and is entirely genuine Kluster recordings.)

== Musical style ==
Eruption performed free-form, improvisational, experimental music, some of which resembles industrial music. A few pieces do have discernible melodies and/or strong rhythmic elements, at times resembling Conrad Schnitzler's earlier work with Tangerine Dream on their Electronic Meditation album.

== Band members ==
=== Core members ===
- Conrad Schnitzler (1970–1972)
- Wolfgang Seidel (1970–1972)
- Klaus Freudigmann (1970–1972)

=== Collaborators ===
- Manuel Göttsching
- Klaus Schulze
- Hartmut Enke
- Lutz Ulbrich
- Michael Gunther
- Dieter Serfas
- Christa Runge

== Discography ==
Albums

- 2005: Eruption (studio album including 6 untitled tracks (duration: 40:52), recorded in 1970 at Studio Freudigmann (Note: ... aka The Loft, Berlin (located about 1 mile east of The Zodiak Free Arts Lab).), Berlin, issued on Italian label Qbico Records (ref. QBICO 32), reissued on CD by Important Records (erroneously) under the name Kluster with additional later Conrad Schnitzler solo live recordings added)
- 2008: Live Action 1972 - Wuppertal (Eruption live album, reissued on CD by Important Records (incorrectly) under the name Kluster)
- 2009: Kluster 1969-1972 (box set, actually Eruption recordings from (only) 1970-1971, issued on Italian label Qbico Records (incorrectly) under the name Kluster)

As bonus tracks on Kluster limited edition CD reissues (Note: ... from Eruption's 1971 recording sessions.)

- 2007: Klopfzeichen (1970) (track "Black Spring")
- 2007: Zwei-Osterei (1971) (track "Cold Winter")
