= York House Recordings =

- Founded: 1979
- Founder: David Elliott
- Defunct: 1984
- Genre: Electronic music, Experimental music, Industrial music, Ambient music
- Country of origin: United Kingdom
- Location: Brighton

York House Recordings, also known as YHR or YHR Tapes, was a small British independent label which released 31 original cassettes of industrial, electronic, experimental, avant-garde, and dark ambient music between 1979 and 1983.

== History ==
York House Recordings was founded by David Elliott, who also published a magazine called Neumusik. Elliott put out a series of cassettes in parallel with the magazine featuring artists from all over the world.

YHR released music by Cluster & Farnbauer (Live In Vienna) and Asmus Tietchens (Musik aus der Grauzone and Musik An Der Grenze) which had been rejected as too unusual by Sky Records. Other notable artists with releases by YHR include Maurizio Bianchi, Günter Schickert, Andrew Cox, Peter Schäfer, Paul Nagle, Duallien, and Elliott's own band MFH, later known as Pump.

Many YHR releases were subsequently reissued by Auricle Music on cassette after the demise of the label. A number have also been reissued on LP or CD by an assortment of labels.

== Catalogue ==
- YHR 001 MFH First Move (1980)
- YHR 002 MFH Within 30 Miles (1980)
- YHR 003 Andrew Cox Arioch (1980)
- YHR 004 Gordon Alien O Puss (1980)
- YHR 005 Maurizio Bianchi Voyeur Tape (1980)
- YHR 006 Maurizio Bianchi Cold Tape (1980)
- YHR 007 Ping-Pong the Bear No, Never any Greyhounds (1980)
- YHR 008 Andrew Cox Methods (1980)
- YHR 009 MFH Masks (1980)
- YHR 010 DAS DAS I (1980)
- YHR 011 Nik Lumsden Alarms & Excursions (1981)
- YHR 012 Andreas Grosser Venite Visum (1981)
- YHR 013 Various Artists YHR Volume I (1981)
- YHR 014 Fondation Métamorphoses (1981)
- YHR 015 Cluster & Farnbauer Live in Vienna (1981)
- YHR 016 MFH Ground Zero (1981)
- YHR 017 Andrew Cox Hydra (1981)
- YHR 018 Paul Nagle The Soft Room (1981)
- YHR 019 Asmus Tietchens Musik aus der Grauzone (1981)
- YHR 020 Conrad Schnitzler Conrad & Sequenza (1981)
- YHR 021 Paul Nagle Tree & Leaf (1982)
- YHR 022 The Klingons Analog-Digital (1982)
- YHR 023 Rüdiger Lorenz Earthrise (1983)
- YHR 024 Asmus Tietchens Musik an der Grenze (1983)
- YHR 025 Andrew Cox Songs from the Earth (1983)
- YHR 026 Cinéma Vérité Rhythmus und Ritual (1983)
- YHR 027 Peter Schäfer Schaf im Wolfspelz (1983)
- YHR 028 MFH Head (1983)
- YHR 029 Yin Yang Flusswelt (1983)
- YHR 030 Duallein Noch kein Regen für Alle (1983)
- YHR 031 Günter Schickert Kinder in der Wildnis (1983)

== See also ==
- List of electronic music record labels
- List of record labels
