= Eruption (disambiguation) =

An eruption most commonly relates to volcanoes, see types of volcanic eruptions.

Eruption may also refer to:

== Geology ==
- Limnic eruption, of dissolved carbon dioxide from a body of water
- hydrothermal explosion, of underground water, especially
  - Geyser eruption

== Astronomy ==
- Solar eruption or flare
- Nova of a star, such as
  - Eta Carinae's "Great Eruption" (1837–55) and "Lesser Eruption" (1887–95)

== Medicine ==
- Tooth eruption, the emergence of teeth through the gum
- List of skin conditions, various of which are called "eruptions"

== Music ==
- Eruption (British band), a 1970s/1980s British disco/R&B band
- Eruption (German band), a short-lived (1970-1972) German experimental band
- Eruption (Slovenian band)
- Eruption (album), by Kluster
- "Eruption" (instrumental), from Van Halen's first album
- "Eruption", by Emerson, Lake & Palmer from the suite "Tarkus"
- "Eruption", a 23-minute piece by Focus from the album Focus II or Moving Waves

== Other uses ==
- Eruption (2010 film), a New Zealand television film
- Eruption (1997 film), an American-Peruvian film
- Eruption, screen name of Eric Tai (born 1984), Tongan-Filipino actor, model, host and rugby union player
- Eruption Radio, a London-based radio station
- Eruption (novel), a 2024 novel by Michael Crichton and James Patterson

== See also ==
- Diet Coke and Mentos eruption, or soda geyser
- "Sexual Eruption", 2007 song by Snoop Dogg
