= Lustwandel =

1981 album by Hans-Joachim Roedelius

Studio album by Hans-Joachim Roedelius
- Released: 1981
- Genre: Kosmische musik, new-age, electronic, ambient
- Length: 38:42
- Label: Sky Records
- Producer: Peter Baumann

Hans-Joachim Roedelius chronology
Selbstportrait Vol. III "Reise durch Arcadien" (1980)	Lustwandel (1981)	Wenn Der Südwind Weht (1981)

Professional ratings
Review scores
Source	Rating
Allmusic	link

Lustwandel is the sixth solo album by German keyboardist Hans-Joachim Roedelius, best known for his work with Cluster, Harmonia, and Aquarello. All the pieces on the album were composed by Roedelius with the sole exception of "Wilkommen", which was composed by Roedelius and Will Roper. It was released by Sky Records in 1981 and has been reissued on CD by Sky Records in Germany in 1992 and by the Gyroscope label in the United States in 1996.

The music of Lustwandel is a series of ambient pieces for solo piano or electronic keyboards. Jim Brenholts, who reviewed Lustwandel for Allmusic, writes, in part:

These unique compositions have character, charm, and grace that separate them from standard e-music and avant-garde fare. Roedelius uses gentle acoustics and silence as integral elements of his sound design. He segues within his atmospheres seamlessly. The sound is distinct and fresh. Only Roedelius can sound like this.

== Track listing ==
1. "Lustwandel" – 3:49
2. "Legende" – 2:10
3. "Ansinnen" – 1:04
4. "Betrachtung" – 2:12
5. "Draussen Vorbel" – 4:16
6. "Harlekin" – 1:05
7. "Von Ferne Her" – 3:28
8. "Vom Fliegen" – 3:24
9. "Wilkommen" – 1:56
10. "Pirouette" – 1:33
11. "Dein Antlitz" – 4:07
12. "Langer Atem" – 7:15
13. "Die Andere Blume" – 1:13

== Personnel ==
- Hans-Joachim Roedelius – piano, keyboards
- Peter Baumann – producer
- Will Roper – engineer
