= Old Land =

Compilation album by Cluster and Brian Eno
- Released: 1985
- Recorded: 1977–1978
- Genre: Ambient; Electronic music Kosmische Musik
- Length: 40:55
- Label: Relativity Records
- Producer: Conny Plank, Hans-Joachim Roedelius, Dieter Moebius, Brian Eno

Professional ratings
Review scores
Source	Rating
Allmusic	4/5 stars

Old Land is a Relativity Records 1985 compilation album by Cluster and Brian Eno. All of the tracks had been previously released on two prior albums: Cluster & Eno and After the Heat, which were released on LP by Sky Records in 1977 and 1978, respectively. The title is drawn from a track originally released on After the Heat.

== Track listing ==
1. "Base and Apex" – 4:29
2. "Broken Head" – 5:25
3. "The Belldog" – 6:16
4. "Tzima N'Arki" – 4:30
5. "Schöne Hände" – 3:03
6. "Steinsame" – 4:06
7. "Wehrmut" – 3:20
8. "Für Luise" – 5:04
9. "Old Land" – 4:10
- Tracks 5–8 from Cluster & Eno, others from After the Heat

== Personnel ==
- Brian Eno – vocals, bass guitar, synthesizers, keyboards
- Dieter Moebius – synthesizers, keyboards
- Hans-Joachim Roedelius – synthesizers, keyboards
- Holger Czukay – bass guitar on "Tzima N'arki"
