= Japan 1996 Live =

Live album by Cluster
- Released: 1997
- Recorded: 1996
- Genre: Krautrock; Experimental; Electronic; Ambient
- Length: 71:14
- Label: Captain Trip Records
- Producer: Cluster, Tim Story, & Felix Jay.

Cluster chronology
One Hour (1995)	Japan 1996 Live (1997)	First Encounter Tour 1996 (1997)

Professional ratings
Review scores
Source	Rating
AllMusic	link

Japan 1996 Live is the eleventh full-length album by German electronic music outfit Cluster. It was the second of three live albums released by Cluster.

Japan 1996 Live was recorded at On Air West in Tokyo and also in Osaka, Japan in June, 1996. It was Cluster's first release for the Japanese Captain Trip label, which has subsequently released a number of Cluster and Kluster reissues. The album was co-produced by noted keyboardist and ambient music composer Tim Story.

== Track listing ==
1. From Osaka "Muse Hall"/"On Air West" (Tokyo) – 25:21
2. From Osaka "Muse Hall" – 6:26
3. From Osaka "Club Quattro" – 4:14
4. From Osaka "Muse Hall" – 35:13

== Personnel ==
- Hans-Joachim Roedelius – synthesizer [Ensoniqe Ts10], piano [Yamaha], wind chimes, tape, effects
- Dieter Moebius – synthesizer [Korg Prophecy, Proteus Sfx], tape, effects
- Felix Jay – producer
- Tim Story – producer
