= Live in Vienna (Cluster album) =

Live in Vienna, 1980
- Cover of 2010 CD reissue on the Important Records label

Live album by Cluster & Farnbauer
- Released: 1980
- Recorded: 1980
- Length: 1:27:30
- Label: York House Records

Cluster chronology
Grosses Wasser (1979)	Live in Vienna, 1980 (1980)	Curiosum (1981)

Professional ratings
Review scores
Source	Rating
AllMusic	4/5 stars

Live in Vienna, 1980 is a live collaborative album by German electronic music outfit Cluster and percussionist Joshi Farnbauer. It is the first of four live albums recorded by Cluster, and their only work with Farnbauer.

The album was released as a limited edition cassette on the British York House Records (YHR) label. It was reissued in Germany on the Transmitter label. In August 2010, the album was reissued as a double CD by the American label Important Records, including remastered audio and new artwork by Dieter Moebius.

== Background ==
On June 12, 1980, Cluster performed at the Wiener Festwochen Alternativ with Farnbauer. The style of much of the music is highly experimental and discordant and very reminiscent of Moebius and Roedelius' early work with Conrad Schnitzler in Kluster, albeit with updated electronic instrumentation. Two notable exceptions are "Piano and "Ausgang", which are melodic in style. "Piano" concludes with a live rendition on "Manchmal" which originally appeared on the album Grosses Wasser (1979).

On the CD reissue, some of the songs were edited down to fit the 80-minute time restraints of the CD. About a minute and a half of audience applause and live stage prep was edited out between "Service" and "Kurz". Also, "Drums" was edited down to just over half of its original length to 7:35.

Two excerpts from this album, were included as bonus tracks on the Hypnotic CD reissues of the first two Kluster albums, Klopfzeichen and Zwei-Osterei. A 15:56 long excerpt of "Metalle" beginning about 3:03 was included with "Klopfzeichen". A 15:10 long excerpt of "Service" beginning about 3:01 was included with "Zwei-Osterei"

== Track listing ==
1. "Service" – 32:44
2. "Kurz" – 4:30
3. "Piano" – 5:30
4. "Drums" – 13:30
5. "Metalle" – 24:25
6. "Ausgang" – 7:00

== Personnel ==
- Hans-Joachim Roedelius – composer, performer
- Dieter Moebius – composer, performer, artwork on CD reissue
- Joshi Farnbauer – composer, performer
- Michael Jürs – percussion on "Metalle"
- Paul Rapnik – percussion on "Metalle"
- Eric Spitzer-Marlyn – recording engineer
