= Curiosum =

Studio album by Cluster
- Released: 1981
- Recorded: May 1981
- Studios: Hamet Hof, Vienna, Austria
- Genres: Krautrock, kosmische musik, experimental, electronic, ambient
- Length: 38:50
- Label: Sky
- Producers: Dieter Moebius and Hans-Joachim Roedelius

Cluster chronology
Live in Vienna (1980)	Curiosum (1981)	Apropos Cluster (1991)

Professional ratings
Review scores
Source	Rating
AllMusic	2.5/5 stars
Classic Rock	6/10 stars

Curiosum is the ninth album by the electronic music outfit Cluster. It was also the final collaboration between Dieter Moebius and Hans-Joachim Roedelius before an eight-year hiatus.

Curiosum was recorded in May 1981 at Hamet Hof in Vienna, Austria and released later that year. The album was Cluster's last release for Sky. It lives up to its name, with the seven relatively short tracks of offbeat and unusual melodies. Stewart Mason, in his review for Allmusic, writes that Cluster "...had started taking cues from the groups they'd initially inspired. Gone are the side-long experiments of early Cluster albums..."

The album was reissued on CD by Sky in 1996. A 1,000 copy limited edition digitally remastered CD of Curiosum was released on the Japanese Captain Trip Records label on September 20, 2007.

== Track listing ==
All tracks by Cluster.

Side one

1. "Oh Odessa" – 3:15
2. "Proantipro" – 7:30
3. "Seltsame Gegend" ("Strange Thing") – 8:00

Side two

1. "Helle Melange" ("Light Melange") – 3:45
2. "Tristan in der Bar" ("Tristan in the Bar") – 3:00
3. "Charlic" – 4:40
4. "Ufer" ("Riverbank") – 8:40

== Personnel ==
- Hans-Joachim Roedelius – synthesizer
- Dieter Moebius – synthesizer
