= First Encounter Tour 1996 =

Live album by Cluster
- Released: 1997
- Recorded: 1996
- Genre: Krautrock; Experimental; Electronic; Ambient
- Length: 2:30:59
- Label: Purple Pyramid
- Producer: Tim Story

Cluster chronology
Japan 1996 Live (1997)	First Encounter Tour 1996 (1997)	Berlin 07 (2008)

First Encounter Tour 1996 is the thirteenth full-length album by German electronic music outfit Cluster. It is also the third live album released, and the only double album released by Cluster.

First Encounter Tour 1996 was recorded at various concert venues around the United States in 1996 and was produced by noted keyboardist and ambient musician Tim Story at Zeta in Toronto, Ontario, Canada. It was released on February 25, 1997. First Encounter Tour 1996 was Cluster's only release for the Purple Pyramid label.

The music of First Encounter Tour 1997 flows from one music style to the next and reflects all the varieties of Cluster's music from the 1979 release Großes Wasser onwards. Some sections of the longer tracks do seem to break new musical ground for Cluster, with deeply atmospheric ambient music leading into sections with a definite melody and beat. Each track is named for the city or cities in which the concerts took place, with the sole exception of the last track which is named for guest musicians Bond Bergland and The Brain (the duo of Paul M. Fox and Tommy Grenas), which was recorded in Anderson, Indiana and Chicago, Illinois. Much of the music is improvisational but some set pieces were included. For example, the track "Portland Oregon #2" is a live performance of "Emmental" from the 1991 release Apropos Cluster. A short section of "New York City", the nearly 33 minute piece which opens the album, is taken from the avant-garde middle section of the title track from Grosses Wasser. A number of sections of various pieces are very similar to sections of Japan 1996 Live.

== Track listing ==
1. "New York City" – 32:58
2. "Phoenix Arizona #1" – 4:04
3. "Portland Oregon #1" – 29:05
4. "New Orleans Louisiana" – 4:42
5. "Portland Oregon #2" – 3:36
6. "Providence Rhode Island" – 7:01
7. "Eugene Oregon" – 20:13
8. "Asheville North Carolina" – 2:41
9. "Chicago Illinois" – 5:31
10. "Phoenix Arizona #2" – 13:30
11. "Covington Kentucky" – 4:51
12. "Minneapolis Minnesota" – 6:51
13. "Bond Bergland / The Brain" – 15:56

== Personnel ==
- Dieter Moebius – Korg Prophecy, Proteus FX, mini-Moog, preprepared tape material, effect machine, mixing table
- Hans-Joachim Roedelius – Ensonique TS10, grand piano, wind chimes, preprepared tape material, effect machine, mixing table
- Bond Bergland
- Paul M. Fox
- Tommy Grenas
- Tim Story – producer
- Russ Curry – engineer
