= Time Regained =

Time Regained could refer to:

- Le Temps retrouvé, the final volume of Remembrance of Things Past by Marcel Proust, published in 1927
- A song on the 1974 album In Search of Eddie Riff by Andy Mackay, co-written by Brian Eno
- "Gefundene Zeit (Time Regained)", a song on the 1984 album Geschenk des Augenblicks – Gift of the Moment by German keyboardist Hans-Joachim Roedelius
- Time Regained (film), a 1999 French film based on Proust's work
- Time Regained, a 2008 fantasia by composer Charles Wuorinen
