= Hearts No Static =

- Origin: Stockholm, Sweden
- Genres: Post-rock, instrumental rock, ambient, alternative rock, indie rock
- Years active: 2009–present
- Labels: Bureau-B, It's a Trap!
- Members: John Roger Olsson; Otto Johansson; Mikko Singh
- Past members: Jens Pettersson
- Website: www.heartsnostatic.com

Hearts No Static is an instrumental post-rock band from Stockholm, Sweden.

== Biography ==
The band was started in 2009 by John Roger Olsson, Otto Johansson and Jens Pettersson. The music of HNS has been described as post-rock with influences of ambient, drone and minimalism.

On September 17, 2009, the band released the debut EP "The Monthly Noise" on label/news blog It's a Trap! as a free download. The EP was recorded after the debut album "Motif" which was released on November 20, 2009, via the German label Bureau-B.

"Motif" received good reviews in the press in the UK, Germany and Sweden. UK news site MadeLoud.com wrote "Unlike the constant building of Explosions in the Sky, who always seem to be reaching higher towards some epic peak, Motif stays decidedly still. The band carves out a stable location and ventures away from it in tentative excursions, only to retrace their footsteps back to the start once again. Gone is the tension and release formula that so much post-rock relies on, replaced instead by a repetitive cycle that invokes comfort and familiarity."

Alex Woodward at RockARolla Magazine wrote: "For the most part, Hearts No Static avoid the more worthy bombast of their many contemporaries, in favor of an even more beautiful lower key take, with shades of Tortoise and Do Make Say Think's jazz inflections and a subtle, majestic ambient yearning, proving that there's still life in the old post-rock yet."

In 2012 drummer Jens Pettersson quit the band and guitarist John Roger Olsson switched from guitar to drums and Mikko Singh from Will Gambola Sing/Haleiwa was announced as the new guitarist.

== Recent activity ==
- Music news blog It's a Trap! reported in June, 2012 that HNS is working on a new album.

== Discography ==
- 2015: Rural Life (This Is Forte)
- 2009: The Monthly Noise EP (It's a Trap!)
- 2009: Motif (Bureau B)
