= Grosses Wasser =

Großes Wasser

Studio album by Cluster
- Released: June 15, 1979
- Recorded: 1979
- Genre: Krautrock; Experimental; Electronic; Ambient
- Length: 35:38
- Label: Sky (Germany)
- Producer: Peter Baumann and Cluster

Cluster chronology
After the Heat (1978)	Großes Wasser (1979)	Live in Vienna (1980)

Professional ratings
Review scores
Source	Rating
AllMusic	link

Großes Wasser is the seventh album by the electronic music outfit Cluster. It was co-produced by former Tangerine Dream member Peter Baumann. Großes Wasser marked the return to Cluster working as a duo of Hans-Joachim Roedelius and Dieter Moebius after two albums collaborating with Brian Eno.

Großes Wasser was recorded and released in 1979 on the Hamburg, Germany-based Sky label. It featured a wide variety of styles, including some of the most avant-garde material created by Moebius and Roedelius since the demise of Kluster with Conrad Schnitzler's departure in 1971, particularly during the middle section of the title track, which occupied all of side 2. Other tracks, including "Manchmal" and both the opening and closing sections of "Großes Wasser" continued the gentle, melodic style of the previous three albums, while others echoed the rhythmic style of Zuckerzeit, albeit with more of an edge. Steven and Alan Freeman, writing in their book The Crack in the Cosmic Egg, describe the title track, in part, as "... a lengthy suite growing out of silence with atmospheric Florian Fricke-like sustained piano tones, via bizarre crackling electronics onto almost tribal-industrial rock percussives."

Großes Wasser was first reissued on CD by Sky Records in 1992. It was first released in the U.S. by the Gyroscope label on March 19, 1996. A 1,000-copy limited edition digitally remastered CD was released on the Japanese Captain Trip label on September 20, 2007.

== Track listing ==
1. "Avanti" – 4:44
2. "Prothese" ("Prothesis") – 2:04
3. "Isodea" – 4:03
4. "Breitengrad 20" – 4:04
5. "Manchmal" ("Sometimes") – 2:05
6. "Großes Wasser" ("Big Water") – 18:38

== Personnel ==
- Hans-Joachim Roedelius – keyboards, percussion, vocals
- Dieter Moebius – keyboards, percussion, vocals
- Peter Baumann – producer
- William Roper – engineer
