= Apropos Cluster =

Studio album by Moebius and Roedelius
- Released: 1991
- Recorded: 1989–1990
- Genres: Krautrock; Experimental; Electronic; Ambient
- Label: Curious Music

Cluster chronology
Curiosum (1981)	Apropos Cluster (1991)	One Hour (1995)

Apropos Cluster is a full-length studio album by Dieter Moebius and Hans-Joachim Roedelius also known as German electronic music outfit Cluster. It was also their first album after an eight-year-long hiatus.

In 1989 Dieter Moebius and Hans-Joachim Roedelius reunited to the delight of their fans, recording Apropos Cluster during 1989 and 1990 in Blumau, Austria. The album was released on the Curious Music label in 1991. It was "Cluster"'s first U.S. release. Apropos Cluster is musically and structurally similar to Grosses Wasser though it lacked the rhythmic tracks of the 1979 release, instead comprising a mixture of gentle, ambient pieces in the four shorter tracks followed by the nearly 22 minute long, more experimental title piece.

"Emmental" became the signature track for Cluster. It was included on the 1997 live album First Encounter Tour 1996 and was often performed live by Roedelius at solo concerts during the band's second hiatus.

Apropos Cluster was reissued on the Swirldisc Records label on August 23, 1996.

== Track listing ==
1. "Grenzgänger" – 7:24
2. "Emmental" – 3:24
3. "Gespiegelt" – 6:58
4. "Falls" – 2:57
5. "Apropos Cluster" – 21:41

== Personnel ==
- Hans-Joachim Roedelius
- Dieter Moebius
- Stanislaw Michalik – bass on "Emmental"
