= Maru Sankaku Shikaku (disambiguation) =

Maru Sankaku Shikaku is a Japanese psychedelic rock band

Maru Sankaku Shikaku (often stylized as ●▲■), Japanese for ″Circle, Triangle, Square″, may also refer to:

- Marusankakushikaku (まるさんかくしかく / 円三角四角), a zenga by Sengai Gibon
- "○△□", an episode of the television series Squid Game
