= One Hour =

Studio album by Cluster
- Released: 1995
- Recorded: 1994
- Genre: Krautrock; Experimental; Electronic; Ambient
- Length: 60:00
- Label: Gyroscope

Cluster chronology
Apropos Cluster (1991)	One Hour (1995)	Japan 1996 Live (1997)

Professional ratings
Review scores
Source	Rating
AllMusic	link

One Hour is the eleventh full-length album by German electronic music outfit Cluster. It was recorded live in the studio in Vienna, Austria in July 1994 and released on January 24, 1995, on the U.S.-based Gyroscope label. Precisely one hour of music was culled from four hours of improvisation in the studio. The music is continuous, and One Hour is presented as a single piece, the longest Cluster has recorded to date. The CD does have 11 tracks dividing the music, but none of the parts is separately titled. One Hour is structured much like the title track of Großes Wasser, with short, soft melodic sections at the beginning and the end sandwiching a much longer. Rather experimental central section.

Bret Love, who reviewed One Hour for AllMusic, writes, in part:

One Hour [...] is exactly that-- one hour of songs culled from four hours of continuous improvisation. At times the experimental music flows like some bizarre soundtrack for a David Lynch-influenced student film. At others, it sounds like classical music even your Grandma could dig (er... well, maybe not). Although the duo's wildly eclectic, esoteric sound may take some getting used to, One Hour is one of those sneaky discs that continues to grow on you with each listen.

== Track listing ==
1. "One Hour" – 60:00

== Personnel ==
- Hans-Joachim Roedelius – piano, synthesizer
- Dieter Moebius – synthesizer
