= Echtzeit =

Studio album by Qluster
- Released: 4 March 2016
- Genre: Electronic
- Length: 48:21
- Label: Bureau B

Qluster chronology
Tasten (2015)	Echtzeit (2016)

Professional ratings
Aggregate scores
Source	Rating
Metacritic	74/100
Review scores
Source	Rating
AllMusic	3.5/5 stars

Echtzeit is the sixth studio album by German electronic band Qluster. It was released in March 2016 under Bureau B.

== Track list ==
No.	Title	Length
1.	"Stein auf Stein"	3:01
2.	"Beste Freunde"	6:54
3.	"Verweile Doch"	5:15
4.	"Von Weiter Ferne Ganz Nah"	7:31
5.	"Glasperlenspiel"	2:03
6.	"Zweites Kapitel"	1:28
7.	"Das Seltsame Tier Aus dem Norden"	5:33
8.	"Auf der Lichtung"	6:16
9.	"Weg am Hang"	6:32
10.	"In Deinen Händen"	3:48
