= Jardin Au Fou =

- 1998 reissue of Jardin Au Fou by Captain Trip Records

Studio album by Hans-Joachim Roedelius
- Released: 1979
- Recorded: 1978
- Genre: New age, electronic, ambient
- Length: 33:35
- Label: Egg
- Producer: Peter Baumann

Hans-Joachim Roedelius chronology
Durch die Wüste (1978)	Jardin Au Fou (1979)	Selbstportrait (1979)

Professional ratings
Review scores
Source	Rating
Allmusic	3.5/5 stars

Jardin Au Fou is the second solo album by German keyboardist Hans-Joachim Roedelius, best known for his work with Cluster. The title is French for "Madman's Garden".

Jardin Au Fou was recorded from April through July, 1978 at Paragon Studios in Berlin, Germany. It was produced by former Tangerine Dream member Peter Baumann and released by the French label Egg in 1979. Jardin Au Fou was the only early Roedelius album not to be released by Sky Records. The original release included 10 tracks but the final short piece, "Final", was left off the track listing on the original album cover.

Jardin Au Fou was reissued on CD in 1998 by the Japanese Captain Trip label. The reissued version added six bonus tracks which nearly doubled the length of the album. Three of the new tracks are remixes of material on the original recording while three others are newly released. The new tracks are very much in the style of the original album. The remixes, remastering of the original material, and production of the reissue is credited to Eric Spitzer-Martin and was done at The Hitbox in Altenburg, Austria.

Mike Ezzo, who reviewed the album for Groove Unlimited, writes, in part:

"...'Jardin au Fou' was where he cemented that particularly light-hearted and wistful Roedelius sound. Not a garden of madness, rather a garden of whimsy and odd delight, it is simple melodious keyboard music whose character is imbued with unexpected chord progressions that don't resolve in traditional ways, a naive rhythmic sense, and melodic lines that go where you least expect. One gets the feeling that Roedelius had envisioned the scenery of a park on a Sunday afternoon in Paris, or some kind of music from a traveling circus show, when the inspiration for this recording struck him."

Jardin Au Fou was the first of a series of albums where Roedelius ventured firmly into ambient or new age music.

The French record label Jardin Au Fou named themselves after the Roedelius album.

== Track listing ==
1. "Fou Fou" - 3:59
2. "Toujours" - 2:59
3. "Rue Fortune" - 2:23
4. "Balsam" - 2:18
5. "Café Central" - 3:40
6. "Le Jardin" 4:30
7. "Gloria Dolores" - 4:14
8. "Étoiles" 3:55
9. "Schöne Welt" - 4:48
10. "Final" - 0:49

Bonus tracks on 1998 reissue:

11. "Tempera" - 7:25
12. "Étoiles II (remix)" - 3:53
13. "Übers Feld" - 5:40
14. "Le Jardin II (remix)" - 5:03
15. "Mittsommer" - 6:01
16. "Rue Fortune II (remix)" - 2:21

== Personnel ==
- Hans-Joachim Roedelius - synthesizer, keyboards
- Schagzerig Greene - cello, keyboards
- Ulrike Lai - cello
- Wolfgang Diumshede - flute
- Hans Brandeis - guitar
