= Neverless =

Studio album by Roedelius & Morgan Fisher
- Released: 2005
- Recorded: 2002–2003
- Genre: Ambient Music; Electronic music
- Length: 58:06
- Label: Klanggalerie
- Producer: Morgan Fisher, Hans-Joachim Roedelius

Hans-Joachim Roedelius chronology
Lunz Reinterpretations (2005)	Neverless (2005)	Works 1968-2005 (2006)

Morgan Fisher chronology
Three Faces (EP) (2003)	Neverless (2005)	Non Mon (2009)

Neverless is a collaboration between ambient composers and musicians Hans-Joachim Roedelius and Morgan Fisher. Basic tracks were recorded at Roedelius Studio in Austria and The Handmade Studio in Tokyo. Tracks were overdubbed and mixed by Morgan Fisher at The Handmade Studio between July, 2002 and August, 2003. All tracks were composed or improvised by Roedelius and Fisher with the exceptions of "However" by Roedelius, Fisher, and Felix Jay, and "Inparticular" by Roedelius, Fisher, and Fabio Capanni.

After an introduction by Walter Robotka of Klanggalerie, a label which had previously released works by both artists, Roedelius sent Morgan Fisher a number of recordings including two collaborative pieces, one with guitarist Fabio Capanni, whom Roedelius had worked with in his Aquarello project, and the other with guitarist Felix Jay. Fisher added layers of music and sound to the material to complete the project. The two men never met until after the album was completed. Roedelius and Fisher gave a joint concert in Vienna in October, 2005. Neverless was released on the Klanggalerie label on November 21, 2005.

The Eurock review of the album says, in part: "Achim’s patented cerebral synthetic tapestries are complimented to perfection here by Fisher’s delicate melodies and spatial treatments. There layers of wafting classical overtones, spatial tone colors, and layers of shape shifting undulations, all of which melt together forming a magical soundscape of dynamic, warmly meditative electronics..."

== Track listing ==
1. "Always" – 8:03
2. "Whatelse" – 7:10
3. "However" – 7:52
4. "Inparticular" – 19:47
5. "Wherefrom" – 15:14

== Personnel ==
- Hans-Joachim Roedelius – Synthesizers, pre-prepared sound material
- Morgan Fisher – Sampler, variophon, clavinet, percussion, voice
- Fabio Capanni – Guitar of "Inparticular"
- Felix Jay – Guitar on "However"
