= Durch die Wüste =

Studio album by Hans-Joachim Roedelius
- Released: 1978
- Recorded: 1976–1978
- Genre: Krautrock; Progressive rock Electronic music Ambient music
- Length: 39:49
- Label: Sky Records
- Producer: Hans-Joachim Roedelius & Conrad Plank.

Hans-Joachim Roedelius chronology
After the Heat (1978)	Durch die Wüste (1978)	Jardin Au Fou (1979)

Professional ratings
Review scores
Source	Rating
Allmusic	4.5/5 stars

Durch die Wüste is the first full-length solo album by German keyboardist Hans-Joachim Roedelius, best known for his work with Cluster, Harmonia, and Aquarello. The title is German for "Through the Desert."

The music on Durch Die Wüste was recorded over a two-year period from 1976 to 1978 at Conny's Studio outside of Cologne, Germany. Conny Plank and Dave Hutchins served as sound engineers and was co-produced by Roedelius and Plank. It was released by Sky Records in 1978. Cluster had achieved international recognition and acclaim the previous year after collaborating with Brian Eno and releasing Cluster & Eno in 1977. This success enabled Roedelius to launch a solo career while continuing to work with Cluster.

In reviewing the album for Allmusic, Keith Farley writes, in part: "Though these tracks often stray from beatless space music (the opener 'Am Rockzipfel' flits back and forth between electronic hard rock and space), the musical structures employed certainly suggest ambience, from the classical melodies of the title track to the gaseous atmosphere of 'Glaubersalz.'" Durch Die Wüste has received numerous highly favorable reviews.

Durch Die Wüste was reissued on CD on March 19, 1996 by the American Gyroscope label and in 2009 on the German label Bureau B.

== Track listing ==
All tracks by Hans-Joachim Roedelius

1. "Am Rockzipfel" - 5:02
2. "Durch Die Wüste" - 13:51
3. "Johanneslust" - 5:00
4. "Glaubersalz" - 3:26
5. "Mr. Livingstone I Suppose" - 5:40
6. "Regenmacher" - 6:39

== Personnel ==
- Jaso Christo – bass, guitar
- Gareth Davies – translation
- Dave Hutchins – engineer
- Willem Makkee – remastering
- Dieter Moebius – synthesizer
- Conny Plank – synthesizer, guitar, percussion, producer, engineer, mixing, stimme
- Hans-Joachim Roedelius – bass, percussion, synthesizer, vocals, strings, producer, stimme
- Asmus Tietchens – liner notes
