= Qua (album) =

Studio album by Cluster
- Released: May 21, 2009
- Recorded: November 2008
- Studio: Seventh Chance Studio, Maumee, Ohio, US
- Genre: Krautrock, electronic
- Length: 54:40
- Label: Nepenthe
- Producer: Tim Story

Cluster chronology
Berlin 07 (2008)	Qua (2009)

Qua is the eleventh and final album by German Krautrock band Cluster, released in May 2009 on Nepenthe Music. It is the band's twelfth studio album and first in fourteen years.

== Critical reception ==
Professional ratings
Review scores
Source	Rating
AllMusic	3.5/5 stars
Classic Rock	7/10 stars
Drowned in Sound	(7/10)

AllMusic's Wilson Neate wrote that Qua proves that Cluster still have something "relevant" and "credible" to contribute musically to, as the album "conjures imaginary cinematic sequences in both spartan monochrome and rich Technicolor, spanning diverse moods: from the austere, droning 'Xanesra' and the somber, hymnal 'Flutful' to the playful 'Albtrec Com' and 'So Ney'." Nick Neyland of Drowned in Sound described the album as "another bend in the road for Cluster, another set of songs knotted up in dead ends, another tiny coterie of bewildering puzzles. It’s also another chance to hear them never quite get to where they’re going to, and that still feels like the perfect space for them to operate in." Hannah Gregory of The Quietus said that throughout the album, "the meandering experimentation is scripted with Cluster's still flowing, indelible ambient ink." Louis Pattison of Uncut complimented Cluster for "maintaining a commendable consistency" on an album that contains songs of such divergent styles.

== Track listing ==
All tracks composed by Moebius/Roedelius.

1. "Lerandis" – 1:46
2. "So Ney" – 3:21
3. "Flutful" – 2:36
4. "Protrea" – 1:59
5. "Zircusile" – 1:38
6. "Xanesra" – 4:02
7. "Na Ernel" – 3:48
8. "Putoil" – 1:33
9. "Malturi Sa" – 4:53
10. "Diagon" – 1:22
11. "Gissander" – 6:55
12. "Ymstrob" – 1:39
13. "Albtrec Com" – 4:05
14. "Stenthin" – 3:48
15. "Curvtum" – 1:00
16. "Formalt" – 5:03
17. "Imtrerion" – 5:12

== Personnel ==
Credits for Qua adapted from AllMusic.

- Dieter Moebius – composer, concept, cover art
- Hans-Joachim Roedelius – composer
- Tim Story – concept, cover art, producer
- Paula Ashley – art direction, design
- Tim Fisher – art direction, design
