= Zodiak Free Arts Lab =

The Zodiak Free Arts Lab, sometimes known as the "Zodiak Club" or "Zodiac Club", was a short-lived but highly influential experimental live music venue, founded in the then West Berlin in spring 1968 by German artists/musicians Conrad Schnitzler (1937–2011) and Hans-Joachim Roedelius (born 1934), together with Boris Schaak (1942–2012).

The Zodiak Free Arts Lab was based in a large rented backroom area within a building in Hallesches Ufer, along the north bank of the Landwehr Canal in the Kreuzberg district of Berlin, near the corner of Großbeerenstraße. The main purpose of this building from 1962 until 1981 was as the first home of the Schaubühne am Halleschen Ufer, a politically inspired and motivated theatre company. Hence, the Zodiak could not open until late in the evening after the theatre itself had closed, so that the theatrical performances would not be drowned out by the noise.

The Zodiak itself was sub-divided into two main performance areas, one of which was painted completely white and the other completely black, and was filled with various instruments, amplifiers and speakers which people could more or less do with as they pleased. Here, musicians were allowed to experiment with free jazz, psychedelic rock and avant-garde styles. Conventional forms of music were frowned upon: a phrase frequently used to describe the spirit of the times was that "songs were considered bourgeois."

Among the many artists and bands who passed through the Zodiak in their early days were Ash Ra Tempel, Geräusche (Noises), Plus/Minus, Curly Curve, Per Sonore, Human Being, The Agitation (later Agitation Free), Klaus Schulze and, most significantly, Tangerine Dream. While not quite reaching the status of being "house band," Tangerine Dream certainly played there frequently over a 3-month period, sometimes for five or six hours a night and for little or no payment, and the loud, iconoclastic improvised music sometimes climaxed with Who-style destruction of equipment. The club played an important role in the development of a style of music that would later be called krautrock.

Whether due to the Schaubühne's management calling for things to be toned down, or the restlessness of the West Berlin scene simply seeking other outlets for expression, has not been recorded, but the Zodiak lasted only a few months, closing in early 1969. Nevertheless, it earned a significant place in German rock history and is fondly remembered by all who were associated with it. In 1969 one of its founders, Conrad Schnitzler, joined Tangerine Dream for a while, playing on their first album, Electronic Meditation, released in 1970. After leaving Tangerine Dream, Schnitzler rejoined one of the Zodiak's other founders, Hans-Joachim Roedelius, together with Dieter Moebius (born 1944), and formed his own band, Kluster (name later anglicised to Cluster).

As for the building that once housed the Zodiak, the Schaubühne relocated in 1981 to its present home in a former cinema (the Kino Universum, designed by architect Erich Mendelsohn in 1926), in Lehniner Platz, along the Kurfürstendamm. Its old home then became the Theater am Halleschen Ufer. Today it is one of two additional venues complementing the Hebbel Theater in nearby Stresemannstraße; it is now known as Hebbel am Ufer or "HAU 2".
