= Hans-Joachim Roedelius =

German musician and composer (born 1934)

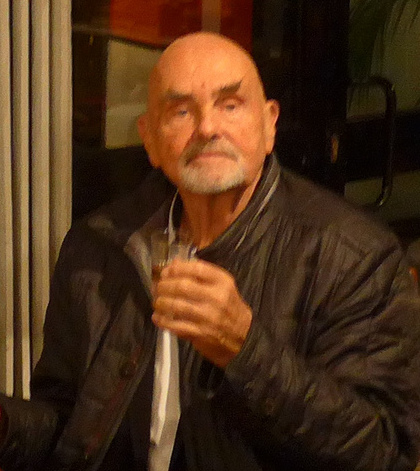
- Roedelius in 2015

Background information
- Born: 26 October 1934 (age 91)
- Origin: Berlin, Germany
- Genres: Electronic, ambient, experimental, kosmische, new age
- Occupations: Musician, producer
- Instruments: Synthesizer, keyboards, piano, guitar
- Years active: 1968–present
- Website: roedelius.com

Hans-Joachim Roedelius (born 26 October 1934) is a German electronic musician and composer, known as a co-founder of the influential 'kosmische' groups Cluster and Harmonia. He is notable for his prolific discography, either as a solo artist, as part of a band, or in collaboration with other artists. He has more than 100 releases to his name. He also performed in the ambient jazz trio Aquarello, and released several solo studio albums.

== Biography ==
=== Early life ===
Roedelius was born on 26 October 1934 in Berlin, Nazi Germany in the family of a dentist. He was an unwilling member of the German Youngsters in the Hitler Youth, membership being mandatory for all boys from the age of ten, and appeared in several propaganda films (Faded Melody by Viktor Tourjansky in 1938 and Riding for Germany by Arthur Maria Rabenalt in 1941). Roedelius and his mother Gertrud were evacuated from Berlin to a small hamlet in East Prussia. In his book Future Days: Krautrock and the Building of Modern Germany, David Stubbs writes that "the aftermath of the war was most difficult for the Roedelius family" who didn't have "enough to live on and just a bit too much to die on". He served two years in prison after the war when he attempted to defect from East Germany. Before managing to escape over the border into West Berlin in 1961, he had worked as a physical therapist and masseur. Soon thereafter he gave up his day job to pursue a career in music.

=== Kluster, Cluster and Harmonia ===
In 1968 Roedelius co-founded the music commune known as "Human Being" and co-formed Zodiak Free Arts Lab, the center of Berlin's Underground Culture at the time, with conceptual artist Conrad Schnitzler. He met Dieter Moebius at the Zodiak. In 1969 Roedelius, Schnitzler and Moebius formed Kluster. In 1971 Schnitzler left the group to start a long-running solo career and Moebius and Roedelius anglicised the band's name to Cluster. They signed first to Philips then to Brain.

In 1973 Roedelius and Moebius worked with Neu! guitarist Michael Rother under the name of Harmonia. Musik Von Harmonia was released on the back of a huge publicity campaign by Brain. Harmonia released one further album, 1975's Deluxe. Rother also co-produced the 1974 Cluster album Zuckerzeit. British musician Brian Eno, a fan of both Cluster and Harmonia, joined them for several jams, the result of which was released in 1997 as Tracks and Traces. Rother left Harmonia to pursue his solo career and Cluster returned to the studio to record Sowiesoso which was released on Sky Records. Brian Eno later worked on two albums with Cluster: 1977's Cluster & Eno and 1978's After the Heat, the latter of which gained the band much attention in the British music press. A further Cluster album produced by former Tangerine Dream member Peter Baumann Großes Wasser extended Cluster's music into long form.

=== Solo career ===
Roedelius' solo career began with Durch die Wüste in 1978 and then Jardin Au Fou in 1979. The first of the lengthy Selbstportrait series was released in 1979, being material done beside his work with Cluster and Harmonia, without the input of his collaborators. Mostly recorded on simple two-track equipment, the Selbstportraits make up the backbone of Roedelius' early solo recordings. Leaving Sky in 1982, his work took a more new-age style as he signed to Virgin's Venture sub-label. During this period, his best selling solo album Geschenk des Augenblicks – Gift of the Moment was released.

He was dropped by Venture in 1989 and began releasing on a variety of small labels. Sinfonia Contempora No. 2: La Nordica (Salz Des Nordens) was released in 1996. Also released in this period was Selbstportrait VI: The Diary of the Unforgotten, the first of the modern Selbstportraits. Now, rather than merely remastering the seventies tapes, Roedelius also played over them, the sound montage Homage á Forst samples many Harmonia and Cluster tracks into the mix.

=== 21st century ===
The turn of the century was Roedelius' most productive year, with no fewer than eight albums being released between 2000 and 2001. Reprising the Selbstportrait series for the seventh time in 2000, Roedelius composed entirely new tracks for the first time on Selfportrait VII: dem Wind voran – ahead of the wind. The new century also saw Roedelius begin to work with other, usually younger, musicians than he had done since the late eighties.

In the meantime, Cluster had reformed. 1990's Apropos Cluster was an update for the band, being a work of avant-techno not dissimilar in style to Großes Wasser. In 1996 Cluster embarked on two international tours, one of Japan and one of America. Cluster reunited again in 2007.

In November 2010 it was announced that Cluster had split up for the third time. In the official announcement, the split-up was described as Moebius leaving the group. In the wake of this news, Roedelius announced that he was beginning a new project called Qluster, to follow on from Cluster and Kluster. The band was made up of Roedelius and accomplished electronic musician Onnen Bock with third member Armin Metz and released a trilogy consisting of "Rufen", "Fragen" and "Antworten" (Calling, Asking and Answering) in 2011.

His autobiography, The Book – The Autobiography of Hans-Joachim Roedelius, was published in 2018.

In March 2021 Roedelius launched his official website and in April he performed his first free surprise live stream concert on YouTube.

== Discography ==
=== In bands ===
In Human Being

- 2008 : Live at the Zodiak – Berlin 1968 (live album)

In Kluster

- 1970 : Klopfzeichen (studio album)
- 1970 : Zwei-Osterei (studio album)
- 1971 : Eruption (live album, originally released as Kluster und Eruption)

In Cluster

- 1971 : Cluster '71 (studio album)
- 1972 : Cluster II (studio album)
- 1974 : Zuckerzeit (studio album)
- 1976 : Sowiesoso (studio album)
- 1979 : Großes Wasser (studio album)
- 1980 : Live in Vienna (live album)
- 1981 : Curiosum (studio album)
- 1984 : Stimmungen (compilation album)
- 1990 : Apropos Cluster (studio album, credited to Moebius + Roedelius)
- 1994 : One Hour (live album)
- 1997 : Japan 1996 Live (live album, credited to Roedelius Moebius on some editions)
- 1997 : First Encounter Tour 1996 (live album)
- 2008 : Berlin 07 (live album)
- 2009 : Qua (studio album)

In Harmonia

- 1974 : Musik Von Harmonia (studio album)
- 1975 : Deluxe (studio album)
- 1976 : Tracks and Traces (studio album, recorded in 1976 and released in 1997)
- 2007 : Live 1974 (live album)

In Aquarello

- 1991 : Friendly Game (studio album, credited to Roedelius, Capanni, Alesini)
- 1993 : To Cover The Dark (studio album)
- 1998 : Aquarello (live album, credited as Roedelius solo album)

In Global Trotters (Kenji Konishi, Susumu Hirasawa, Alquimia, David Bickley, Felix Jay, Alex Paterson)

- 1999 : Drive (studio album)
- 1999 : Global Trotters Project volume I – DRIVE (remix album)

In Qluster

- 2011 : Fragen (album) (studio album)
- 2011 : Rufen (live album)
- 2011 : Antworten (studio album)
- 2013 : Lauschen (live album)
- 2015 : Tasten (studio album – three pianos project)
- 2016 : Echtzeit (studio album)
- 2018 : Elemente (studio album)

=== Solo ===
- 1978 : Durch die Wüste (studio album)
- 1979 : Jardin Au Fou (studio album)
- 1979 : Selbstportrait (studio album)
- 1980 : Selbstportrait – Vol. II (studio album)
- 1980 : Selbstportrait Vol. III "Reise durch Arcadien" (studio album)
- 1981 : Lustwandel (studio album)
- 1981 : Wenn Der Südwind Weht (studio album)
- 1982 : Offene Türen (studio album)
- 1982 : Flieg' Vogel fliege (studio album)
- 1982 : Wasser im Wind (studio album)
- 1984 : Auf leisen Sohlen (compilation album)
- 1984 : Geschenk des Augenblicks – Gift of the Moment (studio album)
- 1984 : Begegnungen (compilation album)
- 1985 : Begegnungen II (compilation album)
- 1986 : Wie das Wispern des Windes (studio album)
- 1987 : Momenti Felici (studio album)
- 1989 : Bastionen der Liebe – Fortress of Love (studio album)
- 1990 : Variety of Moods (studio album)
- 1991 : Der Ohrenspiegel (studio album)
- 1991 : Piano Piano (studio album)
- 1992 : Cuando... Adonde (studio album)
- 1992 : Frühling (studio album) later re-released as Romance in the Wilderness
- 1993 : Tace! (studio album)
- 1994 : Sinfonia Contempora No. 1: Von Zeit zu Zeit (studio album)
- 1994 : Theatre Works (studio album)
- 1995 : Selbstportrait VI: The Diary of the Unforgotten (studio album)
- 1995 : Vom Nutzen der Stunden – Lieder vom Steinfeld Vol. I (studio album)
- 1995 : 61sechzigjahr (compilation album, released privately)
- 1996 : Sinfonia Contempora No. 2: La Nordica (Salz Des Nordens) (studio album)
- 1996 : Pink, Blue And Amber (studio album)
- 1999 : Selfportrait VII: dem Wind voran – ahead of the wind (studio album)
- 1999 : Amerika Recycled by America Inc (studio album)
- 1999 : Vom Nutzen der Stunden – Lieder Vom Steinfeld Vol.II (studio album)
- 2000 : Roedeliusweg (studio album)
- 2001 : Roedelius 2001 – Orgel Solo (studio album)
- 2001 : Das Verwirrte Schaf – Wort-Klang Collage zum Aschermittwoch (studio album)
- 2002 : Selbstportrait VIII – Introspection (studio album)
- 2003 : American Steamboat (studio album)
- 2003 : Counterfeit (studio album)
- 2003 : Lieder vom Steinfeld Vol.III (studio album)
- 2003 : Roedelius 1969–2002 (compilation album)
- 2006 : Works 1968–2005 (compilation album)
- 2007 : Snapshots/Sidesteps (studio album)
- 2008 : Back Soon (compilation album)
- 2010 : Ex Animo (studio album)
- 2016: Manchmal (1 track on 4 tracks compilation EP "past forward", vinyl release only)
- 2017 Release of Roedelius' autobiography "Roedelius – Das Buch" <www.bio.roedelius.com>
- 2017 Music for the soundtrack of Nick Cave for the film "War Machine"
- 2018 Music for the film "Symphony of Now" to be released 14 February
- 2018 Music for the film "Die Rueden" from director Connie Walther (not yet released)
- 2020 : Selbstportrait IX – Wahre Liebe (studio album)
- 2020 : Drauf und Dran (studio album)

=== Collaborations ===
With Brian Eno, Dieter Moebius and Michael Rother

- 1997 : Tracks and Traces (credited to either Harmonia '76 or Harmonia and Eno '76)
- 2009 : Harmonia & Eno '76 Remixes (remix album)

With Brian Eno and Dieter Moebius

- 1977 : Cluster & Eno (credited to Cluster & Eno)
- 1978 : After the Heat (studio album)
- 1985 : Old Land (compilation album) (credited to Cluster and Brian Eno)

With Brian Eno and Dieter Moebius on Eno's solo album

- 1977 : Before and after Science (studio album)
  - Track: "By This River"

With Alexander Czjzek

- 1987 : Weites Land (studio album)

With Aqueous

- 1994 : Grace Notes (studio album)
- 1997 : Meeting The Magus (studio album)

With Richard Barbieri and Chianura

- 1998 : T'ai (studio album)

With Alquimia

- 2000 : Move and Resonate

With Tim Story (sometimes collectively referred to as Lunz)

- 2000 : The Persistence of Memory (studio album)
- 2002 : Lunz (studio album)
- 2005 : Lunz-Reinterpretations (remix album)
- 2008 : Inlandish (studio album)
- 2014 : Lazy Arc (studio album)
- 2018 : The Roedelius Cells (studio album)
- 2019 : Lunz 3 (studio album)
- 2022 : 4 Hands (studio album)

With Conrad Schnitzler

- 2001 : Acon 2000/1 (studio album)

With Fabio Capanni, Felix Dorner, Hirishi Nagashima and Robin Storey

- 2001 : Evermore

With Lynn

- 2001 : Act of Love (studio album)

With Nikos Arvanitis

- 2002 : Digital Love (studio album)

With Noh 1

- 2003 : Imagine Imagine (soundtrack album, released as Roedelius and Fratellis)
- 2009 : Fibre (studio album)

With Morgan Fisher

- 2005 : Neverless (studio album)

With David Bickley

- 2008 : Bonaventura (studio album)

With Kava

- 2008 : The Gugging Album (studio album)

With Tim Story and Dwight Ashley

- 2008 : Errata (studio album)

With Alessandra Celletti

- 2009 : Sustanza di cose sperata (studio album)

With Christopher Chaplin

- 2012 : King of Hearts (studio album)

With Andrew Heath and Christopher Chaplin

- 2017 :Triptych in Blue (live album)

With Lloyd Cole

- 2013 : Selected Studies Vol. 1 (studio album)

With Leon Muraglia

- 2015 : Ubi Bene (studio album)

With Mateo Latosa and Cesar Gallegos (aka TKU Tecamachalco Underground)

- 2016 : Latitudes (music installation for photography exhibition, 2014/studio album release, 2016)

With Arnold Kasar

- 2017 : Einfluss
- 2023 : Zensibility

With Thorsten Quaeschning, Hoshiko Yamane, and Paul Frick

- 2020 : Klangtraube

With Stereo Hypnosis and Eraldo Bernocchi

- 2023 : VIK (studio/live album)
