= Eruption (Slovenian band) =

Slovenian thrash metal band

Eruption is a Slovenian power/thrash metal band.

== Reception ==
Their debut album Lifeless Paradise (2009) has been described as a thrash metal album with equal parts of Bay Area and Teutonic influence. Eruption then introduced more "versatility" on Tenses Collide (2012). On Cloaks of Oblivion (2017), Eruption "float between speed, power, and progressive thrash riffing and tempos", according to Dead Rhetoric who bestowed a 9 out of 10 grade on the album. Vampster called Cloaks of Oblivion "a load of power thrash that I absolutely love", a "highlight", "a fantastic job" and "a magnificent album". Being "absolutely top-notch in their musicianship", the guitarists were "virtuosic" and the vocals "deserve special mention". The production was also "superb" and "meets the highest standards".

Powermetal.de gave 7.5, summarizing: "While there's still room for improvement in terms of originality and hooks, Eruption has undoubtedly delivered a fine and appealing album!". The main strengths were "skull-splitting riffs, the delicate, powerful melodies and memorable vocal passages truly stand out".. Heavymetal.dk landed on a 7. Eruption did not present the largest showing of originality, but had "its individual touch" as well as solid technical quality. "Fat riffs, catchy melodies and a good production are the clear strengths of this output", though the album lacked the highest peaks and the "wow" factor.

Five years later, Eruption followed with Tellurian Rupture. Rock Hard found it worthy of 7 out of 10 points. Norway's Scream Magazine gave 5 of 6, noting that Eruption's thrash metal was "very watered-down" with heavy metal, though this made "the style of the band interesting". The elements of heavy metal reminded the reviewer of Sanctuary. Klemen Kalin "sings like a hero", and the guitar work was also commendable. Tellurian Rupture was also eleventh in the "pearls of 2022" list compiled by Powermetal.de's reviewer Holger Andrae.

== Discography ==
- Lifeless Paradise (2009)
- Tenses Collide (2012)
- Live Transmissions (live album, 2014)
- Cloaks of Oblivion (2017)
- Tellurian Rupture (2022)
