= Will Gambola Sing =

- Origin: Stockholm, Sweden
- Genres: Alternative rock Indie pop instrumental pop postrock
- Instruments: drums, guitar, keyboard, bass
- Years active: 2006–present
- Label: Friend of Mine Records
- Members: Mikko Singh; Joakim Labraaten; Bo Anders Ljung; John Roger Olsson
- Past members: Jimmy Ottosson; Jon Lennblad
- Website: Official site

Will Gambola Sing is an instrumental pop band from Stockholm, Sweden.

== Biography ==
The band was started in 2006 by Mikko Singh, Joakim Labraaten and John Roger Olsson. Yamon Yamon guitarist and singer Jon Lennblad played bass in the band during a short period. Later the band members met Bo Anders Ljung. He permanently joined the band in 2007. The music of WGS has been described as instrumental pop/rock or post-rock.

The band recorded an EP in 2007 called "Overheard Dialogue Reconstructed EP" which was offered for free on the band's website in 2009.

In 2009 WGS teamed up with Japanese label Friend of Mine Records to release the band's debut album. The self-titled album was released in February 2010 and was only distributed in Asia.

== Recent activity ==
- Music news blog It's a Trap! reported in 2011 that WGS is working on a new album.

== Discography ==
- 2007: Overheard Dialogue Reconstructed EP (Self released)
- 2010: Will Gambola Sing (Friend of Mine Records)
