= Maru Sankaku Shikaku =

Japanese band

- Origin: Japan
- Genres: Psychedelic rock
- Years active: 1970–1973
- Past members: Sakuro "Kant" Watanabe; Kohji "Tohchan" Miura; Etsuko "Manager" Watanabe; Reck; Chiko-Hige; Juno; Yoshiyuki Hida

Maru Sankaku Shikaku (written ○△□) was a Japanese rock band credited for being one of Japan's earliest psychedelic groups.

== History ==
=== Formation (1970-1972) ===
The group formed by Sakuro "Kant" Watanabe in 1970 took their name from the Japanese words for a circle, a triangle, and a square. Watanabe during this time also worked as the drummer for a band called Murahachibu and published his own magazine. The band performed wearing various costumes and face paint while moving from city to city.

=== Recording and break up (1973) ===
In 1973, the band began recording in the Gyoen Studio. In 2001, a box set was released of these recordings on Captain Trip Records, but the band broke up later in 1973 without having released any material during their period of activity.

Several years later, members Chiko-Hige and Reck, having played in No Wave bands James Chance and the Contortions and Teenage Jesus and the Jerks, respectively, formed the punk rock band, Friction.
