= Electronic Meditation =

- 1970 LP album cover

Studio album by Tangerine Dream
- Released: June 1970
- Recorded: October 1969
- Genres: Krautrock; experimental rock; psychedelia; electronic rock
- Length: 36:37
- Label: Ohr
- Producer: Tangerine Dream

Tangerine Dream chronology
Electronic Meditation (1970)	Alpha Centauri (1971)

Electronic Meditation is the debut album by German electronic music group Tangerine Dream. It was released in June 1970 by record label Ohr.

== Recording and release ==
The album was recorded in a rented factory in Berlin in October 1969, using just a two-track Revox tape recorder.

The first four albums released by Ohr Records, including Electronic Meditation, featured sleeves by Reinhard Hippen, all with dismembered baby doll parts as a central aspect of the imagery. The original LP had a balloon inserted in the cover; the 2004 Japan CD release is a copy of the original LP cover and includes the balloon.

Electronic Meditation is the only Tangerine Dream album to feature the line-up of Edgar Froese, Klaus Schulze and Conrad Schnitzler. Two other musicians, organist Jimmy Jackson and flautist Thomas Keyserling, also performed on the album although they were uncredited in the original release. Schulze left the band before Electronic Meditation was released, and Schnitzler followed him shortly after.

== Composition ==
Its style is a unique form of free jazz, electronic art music, and instrumental rock; or as Sound on Sound magazine described it, "free electronic rock". Its instrumentation ranges from conventional instruments such as the guitar, organ, drums, and cello to various custom-made electronic devices implemented by Edgar Froese and found sounds such as broken glass, burning parchment, and dried peas being shaken in a sieve. The backwards vocals at the end of side B are of Edgar Froese reading from the back of a ferry ticket from Dover to Calais.

Dominique Leone of Pitchfork described the songs "Cold Smoke" and "Journey Through a Burning Brain" as sonically related to the characteristic sound of Conrad Schnitzler and Klaus Schulze, "than anything TD became famous for". The song "Journey Through a Burning Brain", in particular, reminded Leone about the music from Schnitzler's Kluster records, with "unidentified sound effects and a hard-line approach to free improvisation". The next are considerably gentler than Electronic Meditation.

== Reception ==
Professional ratings
Review scores
Source	Rating
AllMusic	3/5 stars
Classic Rock	6/10 stars
Pitchfork	7.6/10

In its retrospective review, AllMusic wrote: "The album is not without its flaws, but it's strong in many ways and shows abundant promise". Stephen Dalton in his review for Classic Rock described the album as "more an historically interesting cult curio than essential Krautrock milestone"; however, he added that "from sketchy but seminal basement tapes like these, an entire cosmos of sound was mapped."

Music journalist Rob Young described the album as "landmark, [..] a gas-giant of a record, votive and solemn in mood, cosmic in scale, yet built of recognisable materials: mellotrons, analogue rumbles and amplified flute. Somewhere between improvised music, contemporary classical and the future direction of progressive rock."

== Track listing ==
All tracks are written by Edgar Froese, Klaus Schulze and Conrad Schnitzler.

Side A
No.	Title	Length
1.	"Genesis"	5:57
2.	"Journey Through a Burning Brain"	12:26

Side B
No.	Title	Length
3.	"Cold Smoke"	10:38
4.	"Ashes to Ashes"	4:06
5.	"Resurrection"	3:27

== Personnel ==
Tangerine Dream

- Edgar Froese – six- and twelve-string guitar, organ, piano, sound effects, tapes
- Conrad Schnitzler – cello, violin, addiator
- Klaus Schulze – drums, percussion, metal sticks

Additional personnel

- Jimmy Jackson – organ (uncredited in the original release)
- Thomas Keyserling – flute (uncredited in the original release)
