= Eruption (album) =

Live album by Kluster
- Released: 1971
- Recorded: 1971
- Genre: Krautrock; experimental; electronic
- Length: 56:34

Kluster chronology
Zwei-Osterei (1971)	Eruption (1971)

Professional ratings
Review scores
Source	Rating
Allmusic	4/5 stars

Eruption is the third and final full-length album by German experimental music trio Kluster. It is also the only live recording issued by Kluster.

Eruption was recorded in 1971 at the last concert performed by Kluster and was recorded by Klaus Freudigmann. Eruption was released with what, according to Conrad Schnitzler, was an incorrect title Kluster und Eruption in 1971 as a private pressing. Only 200 copies of the original LP were pressed and sold. It was reissued as a Conrad Schnitzler solo album under the title Schwarz (literally "Black"), though the contributions by Hans-Joachim Roedelius and Dieter Moebius were credited. The album was not released under its proper title, Eruption, until the reissue on CD in 1997 by German label Marginal Talent. Conrad Schnitzler also reissued Eruption on CD on Norbert Schilling’s ‘Plate Lunch’ label.

Eruption is widely considered to be the most listenable Kluster release. It is the only release without spoken religious text. In places the style also begins to resemble the electronic sound heard on early albums by Cluster, the successor to Kluster which came into being after Schnitzler's departure. Each side consists of one long, instrumental, improvisational jam. John Bush, writing the review for Allmusic, describes the music in part as having: "...forbidding violin lines, heavily distorted organ, and an assortment of tape effects leading the way for several minimalist guitar workouts."

== Track listing ==
1. "Eruption One" – 31:04
2. "Eruption Two" – 25:30

== Personnel ==
- Conrad Schnitzler
- Hans-Joachim Roedelius
- Dieter Moebius
- Klaus Freudigmann - Engineer
