= Schwann (record label) =

German classical music record label

- Company type: Privately held company
- Industry: record label
- Founded: 1962, Germany
- Headquarters: Germany

Schwann was a German classical music record label based in Düsseldorf and originally connected with the Verlag Schwann publishing house. One of the first records in 1962 was an LP of musical examples to accompany a book on medieval music. The book publishing business of Verlag Schwann is now part of Cornelsen Verlag.

The record company made a number of recordings in cooperation with Abbot Carl de Nys, and the Schwann Musica Mundi series with Musique en Wallonie. Director Dieter Heuler was the director of Schwann both as part of Verlag Schwann, and also after its acquisition by Koch International in 1988 when it was renamed Koch-Schwann. In 2002 Universal Classics acquired Koch-Schwann's catalogue and some of the Schwann and Koch-Schwann recordings began to reappear on Deutsche Grammophon's budget Eloquence imprint. Heuler retained Schwann's VMS signature, and several uncompleted projects.
