= Captain Trip Records =

Japanese record label

- Founded: 1988
- Founder: Ken Matsutani
- Status: active
- Genre: psychedelic rock garage rock krautrock experimental music progressive rock Avant-garde
- Country of origin: Japan
- Location: Tokyo
- Official website: https://www.captaintrip.co.jp/

Captain Trip Records is a Japanese music label founded and run by musician Ken Matsutani. The label specializes in experimental music and various subgenres of rock, particularly psychedelic rock and progressive rock. In addition to the publication of new albums, it has also devoted itself to the reissue of out-of-print records, as well as unreleased old material.

Their catalog includes albums by psychedelic rock bands like Blue Cheer, The Deviants, and The Velvet Underground, experimental music projects like Esplendor Geometrico and ◯△▢ (Maru Sankaku Shikaku), and a vast discography within the German krautrock scene, with records by Conrad Schnitzler, Amon Düül II, Kluster, Cluster, Hans-Joachim Roedelius, Dieter Moebius, Neu!, La Düsseldorf, La! Neu?, 1-A Düsseldorf, Kraan and Guru Guru.
