= Kluster =

German experimental music group

- Origin: Berlin, Germany
- Genres: Experimental, krautrock
- Years active: 1969–1971, 2007–2011
- Spinoffs: Cluster; Moebius & Plank
- Past members: Conrad Schnitzler; Hans-Joachim Roedelius; Dieter Moebius; Klaus Freudigmann; Wolfgang Seidel; Christa Runge; Manfred Paethe; Michael Thomas Roe; Masato Ooyama

Kluster was a Berlin-based German experimental musical group formed in 1969 by Hans-Joachim Roedelius, Conrad Schnitzler, and Dieter Moebius. Their improvisational work presaged later industrial music. The original Kluster was short-lived, existing only from 1969 until mid-1971 when Conrad Schnitzler left and the remaining two members renamed themselves Cluster. Schnitzler later revived the band from 1971 to 1973 and then from 2007 until his death in 2011.

== History ==
=== 1969–71 ===
Kluster was founded by Conrad Schnitzler, Hans-Joachim Roedelius, and Dieter Moebius in 1969. Both Schnitzler and Moebius had been students of Joseph Beuys at the Düsseldorf Fine Arts Academy in the 1960s. Schnitzler and Roedelius both participated in the founding of the Zodiak Free Arts Lab in Berlin in 1968 and had worked together in the avant-garde groups Geräusche (literally "Noises") and Plus/Minus. The trio met when Moebius was working as a steak chef in Berlin, and was invited to join a band by Roedelius and Schnitzler. The band was based in West Berlin. The trio first performed at the Zodiac Club in Berlin that year and were billed in early performances as Ensemble Kluster or Die Klusters. In a 1980 interview with David Elliott, Schnitzler recalled: "...it all started at the "Zodiac Club" in 1969 because there was something THERE and Roedelius and me played with Moebius then using instruments, amps and echoes." He also describes their music at the time as having "A lot of feedback and all those crackling sounds." In addition to violin, flute, piano, cello, percussion, and organ the trio used alarm clocks and kitchen utensils as instruments, Steven and Alan Freeman, writing in The Crack In The Cosmic Egg, describe the musicians and their music: "All three were long-established musicians and radicals on the Berlin underground scene, and naturally what they would come up with was unlike anything heard before!"

Late that year Schnitlzer read a newspaper advertisement by a church organist interested in new music. The result was church sponsorship for the first two albums, Klopfzeichen and Zwei-Osterei, provided Kluster was willing to add religious text to the first side of each LP. Both records were released by Schwann, a label known for church music, and a total of 300 copies of each were pressed and sold. Schnitzler's comments about the text: "If you don't understand the German words, it sounds better. [...] If you know what it means, you'll find it terrible." Klopfzeichen were recorded at Rhenus-Studio in Gordorf, Germany in one session on December 21, 1969 and Zwei-Osterei was recorded at the same location on February 23, 1970. Both sessions were engineered by Conny Plank and produced by Oskar Gottlieb Blarr. The music of the first two albums is described by Steven and Alan Freeman, in part: "Although they never possessed any electronic instruments, the music of Kluster was quite extraordinary, featuring guitars, percussion, organ, cello, etc., with an abundance of sound processing devices, echo, tape machines and filters, to create a music that oozed electricity—stark, bleak, industrial, and nightmarishly unnerving." The trio also toured Germany extensively during 1969–70.

Kluster's third and final album, Eruption, was recorded live in 1971 during the trio's last concert together and was recorded by Klaus Freudigmann, who was also a member of Conrad Schnitzler's other band, also called Eruption. It was initially released as a private pressing with the incorrect (according to Schnitzler) name of Kluster Und Eruption. The original pressing totaled 200 copies. It was reissued in 1973 as Schwarz as a Conrad Schnitzler solo album, though Roedelius and Moebius performances are credited. The album was finally reissued with what Schnitzler insists is the correct title, Eruption, on CD by the German Marginal Talent label in 1997.

Although all three members played many different instruments on the three albums they recorded, the lineup is sometimes described as consisting of Moebius on drums, Roedelius on cello and Schnitzler on keyboards. Unorthodox instruments such as car batteries and electricians' signal generators were also used. Kluster had minuscule sales during the time they were active. Only 300 copies each of the first two LPs were pressed and sold. Each of the members gained a much larger following as a result of their later works and reissues on LP in the 1980s and CD reissues released in 1996 and 1997 garnered much more respectable sales figures.

Conrad Schnitzler left Kluster in mid 1971, briefly to continue work with the band Eruption and then to pursue a solo career. Schnitzler claims that Eruption toured under the name 'Kluster' at the time, and under that pretext re-released in 2009 under the Kluster name two albums originally labelled as being by Eruption.

After the original lineup of Kluster split, Roedelius and Moebius continued with an anglicized version of the name, Cluster, initially together with Conny Plank, and from 1972 onwards as a duo. They were intermittently together until 2010, when Roedelius announced that the band had split up.

=== Kluster revived ===
In a 1999 interview Conrad Schnitzler expressed the hope that Kluster might reunite in 2000. While that never occurred Schnitzler did collaborate with Hans-Joachim Roedelius for the first time in nearly three decades. The resulting recording, Acon 2000/1, was released by the Japanese label Captain Trip in 2001. The style of the album is very reminiscent of Kluster, albeit with modern electronic instrumentation.

In 2007, Schnitzler did indeed resurrect Kluster. Aided by American musician Michael Thomas Roe and Japanese musician Masato Ooyama (Ooy), Schnitzler released "Kluster 2007", a three CD set on the private label Real Vine Music (2008). The music was tagged as "global playing" as each member came from a different continent. Continuing in this direction, "Kluster 2008" (Real Vine Music, 2009) was released in early 2009. This one subtitled "Three Olympic Cities Mix". Again, stressing the global collaboration. And, again, with Michael Thomas Roe and Masato Ooyama.

In 2008 two additional albums were released by Important Records under the Kluster name: Admira and Vulcano. This material was recorded during 1971-1972 by Schnitzler, Freudigmann, and Wolfgang Seidel. Much of the material for these albums had been previously released by Qbico Records with the trio identified as Eruption. There is some debate as to whether the renaming of the records was just a ploy for extra circulation, but there is some record of Schnitzler continuing to use the name Kluster after 1971.

== Personnel ==
=== Core members ===
- Wolfgang Seidel (1969–71)
- Klaus Freudigmann (1969–71)
- Conrad Schnitzler (1969–71; 2007–11)
- Hans-Joachim Roedelius (1969–71)
- Dieter Moebius (1969–1971)

=== Other members ===
- Christa Runge (1970)
- Manfred Paethe (1971)
- Michael Thomas Roe (2007–11)
- Masato Ooyama (Ooy) (2007–11)

=== Additional personnel ===
- Konrad (Conny) Plank (1969–1970)
- Oskar Gottlieb Blarr (1969–1970)

== Discography ==
- 1970 Klopfzeichen (studio album)
- 1971 Zwei-Osterei (studio album)
- 1971 Eruption (live album)
- 2008 Vulcano: Live in Wuppertal 1971
- 2008 Admira
- 2008 Kluster 2007: CMO (studio album)
- 2008 Live Action 1972 - Wuppertal (actually an Eruption live album, reissued on CD by Important Records (incorrectly) under the name Kluster)
- 2009 Kluster 1969-1972 (box set, actually Eruption recordings from (only) 1970–1971, issued on Italian label Qbico Records (incorrectly) under the name Kluster)
- 2009 Kluster 2008: Three Olympic Cities Mix (studio album)
- 2009 CMO 2009: Three Voices (germany-usa-japan) (studio album)
- 2011 A unique remix of the material from Kluster 2007 featured in the Compilation CD VOL K compilation by Zelphabet Records.
- 2011 Kluster CMO 2010 (studio album)
- 2012 Klusterstrasse 69-72 (box set, Kluster material actually entirely recorded 1969–1970)
