= Bureau B =

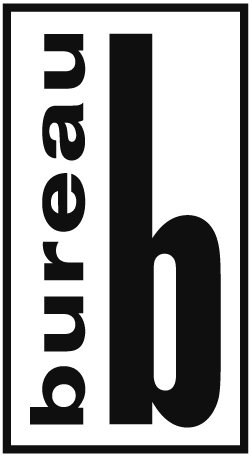
- Founded: 2005
- Founder: Gunther Buskies
- Distributor: Indigo Musikproduktion + Vertrieb GmbH
- Genre: Krautrock, avant-garde electronics, post-punk
- Country of origin: Germany
- Location: Hamburg
- Official website: www.bureau-b.com

Bureau B (sometimes quoted as Bureau-B) is an independent record label, music publisher and booking agency from Hamburg, Germany, founded in 2005 by Gunther Buskies (B for Buskies) as a sister label to Tapete Records. The label releases varieties of electronic, free-spirited music, with the spectrum ranging from pop to avant-garde. The label has amassed an extensive catalogue of reissues and new productions, including classics from the genre of electronic music in the 1970s and early 1980s popularly classified as Krautrock (Cluster, Roedelius, Moebius, Plank, Schnitzler), alongside new recordings by such formative artists as Faust, Kreidler, Roedelius, Tietchens, Moebius.

== History ==
The label started with (re-)releases of quality-rated recordings of German Schlager artists like Gitte (with Kenny Clarke/Francy Boland Big Band), Mary Roos (a chanson album), Heidelinde Weis, or James Last (a 1975 jazzy Easy Listening session in Los Angeles) and compilations like Achtung! German Grooves, Sprechen Sie Pop? or Easy Beatles.

In 2008 Bureau B re-issued one 7" by Neue Deutsche Welle band Palais Schaumburg, and two 7" by Klaus Dinger's la Düsseldorf, and from 2009 began to exploit the catalog of Sky Records, focussing on albums of musical genres like electronica, avant-garde, krautrock: e.g. recordings by Cluster, Conny Plank, Brian Eno, Roedelius, or Dieter Moebius considered as landmark albums.

In 2012 Bureau B expanded its repertoire by re-releasing a series of important out-of-print albums by Conrad Schnitzler as well as recordings out of the catalog of legendary Neue Deutsche Welle label Ata Tak, like D.A.F., Andreas Dorau, Der Plan, or Pyrolator.

Original releases by contemporary artists include Karl Bartos, Faust, Kreidler, Like a Stuntman, Pyrolator, Qluster, Ulrich Schnauss, or Tarwater.

To provide an overview of the various musical styles in which Bureau B specializes, the label launched a compilation entitled KOLLEKTION in 2014. Each release in this series is curated by a musician. So far, artists like Tim Gane, Lloyd Cole, Holger Hiller, Richard Fearless and Thomas Fehlmann have participated. The latest release in this series is KOLLEKTION 05, released in July 2015.

All in all, there have been over 200 releases on Bureau B so far (as of November 2015). The label is internationally distributed, with the overseas sales being considerably higher than the sales in Germany.

== List of artists with original releases ==
- Andreas Dorau
- Automat
- Camera
- Camouflage
- Die Wilde Jagd
- Din A Testbild
- Egoexpress
- Faust
- Gut und Irmler
- Gurumaniax
- Günter Schickert
- Hans Nieswandt
- Hearts No Static
- Junior Electronics
- Karl Bartos
- Kreidler
- Lloyd Cole / H.J. Roedelius
- Like a Stuntman
- Mani Neumeier
- Max Loderbauer
- Moebius / Story / Leidecker
- Moebius + Tietchens
- Neumeier / Kawabata
- Ninca Leece
- Ougenweide
- Pyrolator
- Qluster
- Roedelius / Schneider
- Schneider Kacirek
- Schnauss & Peters
- Schneider TM
- Sølyst
- Tarwater
- Whirlpool Productions
- Ziguri

== List of artists with re-releases ==
- 39 Clocks
- Andreas Dorau
- Asmus Tietchens
- Brian Eno
- Camouflage
- Cluster
- Conrad Schnitzler
- Conny Plank
- Deutsch Amerikanische Freundschaft (D.A.F.)
- Der Plan
- Die Partei
- Fehlfarben
- Günter Schickert
- Hans Nieswandt
- Harald Grosskopf
- Harmonia
- la Düsseldorf
- Michael Rother
- Moebius
- Moebius / Neumeier / Engler
- Palais Schaumburg
- Phantomband
- Pyrolator
- Rüdiger Lorenz
- Roedelius
- Thomas Dinger
- Wolfgang Riechmann
- You

== Releases ==
All the records are printed on high-quality 180g vinyl.

The re-issues contain new liner-notes, e.g. Schnitzler and Sky Records re-issues by Asmus Tietchens, Andreas Dorau re-issues by Carsten Friedrichs. Some of the re-releases contain bonus.

The vinyls additionally include a download code for the album as a digital file or the whole album as a CD.

== See also ==
- Tapete Records
- List of record labels
