= Conrad Schnitzler =

German experimental musician (1937–2011)

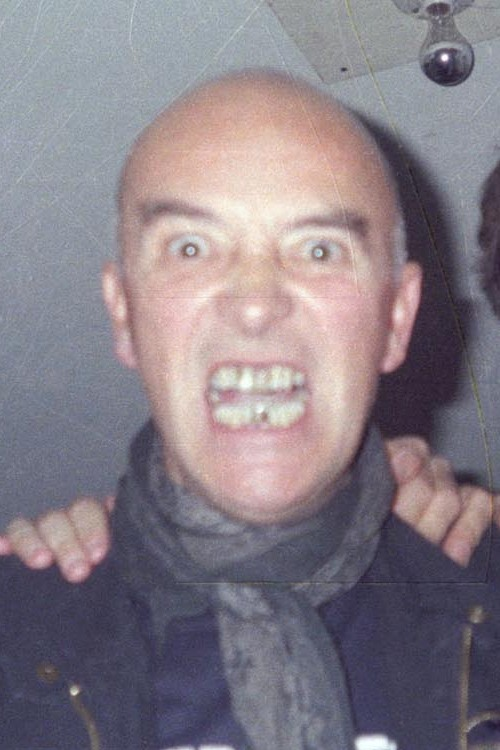
- Schnitzler in 1989

Background information
- Born: 17 March 1937; Düsseldorf, Germany
- Died: 4 August 2011 (aged 74) Berlin, Germany
- Genres: Electronic music; krautrock
- Occupations: Sound designer; musician; foley artist, performing artist
- Instruments: Tape recorder; synthesizer; cello; violin; keyboards; drums
- Years active: 1960–2011
- Label: Schnitzler Private Pressing
- Website: fancymoon.com/con_s

Conrad "Conny" Schnitzler (17 March 1937 – 4 August 2011) was a prolific German experimental musician associated with West Germany's 1970s krautrock movement. A co-founder of West Berlin's Zodiak Free Arts Lab, he was an early member of Tangerine Dream (1969–1970) and a founder of the band Kluster. He left Kluster in 1971, first working with his group Eruption and then focusing on solo works. Schnitzler participated in several collaborations with other electronic musicians.

== Biography ==
Schnitzler was born in Düsseldorf, Germany. His father was German, his mother was Italian. He and his wife had three children; his son Gregor Schnitzler, born in Berlin in 1964, is a film director.

Schnitzler, Dieter Moebius, and Hans-Joachim Roedelius formed Kluster in 1969 after the three had met at the Zodiak Free Arts Lab. This trio released three albums: Klopfzeichen (1970), Zwei-Osterei (1971) and Eruption (1971). When Schnitzler left the group, Roedelius and Moebius became Cluster. Around this time, Schnitzler also joined Tangerine Dream for their debut album Electronic Meditation (1970).

Schnitzler provided the introductory music for Norwegian black metal band Mayhem's debut EP Deathcrush in 1987, following a meeting with teenage guitarist Euronymous in the mid-1980s. The instrumental track, entitled "Silvester Anfang", was randomly selected from Schnitzler's archive of works in progress. The piece is still played at most of the band's live shows. For many years Schnitzler appeared in the comics of Matt Howarth (particularly Savage Henry) as a member of the band The Bulldaggers. His 2006 work Moon Mummy is a collaboration with Matt Howarth based on an included PDF comic.

Schnitzler died from stomach cancer on 4 August 2011 in Berlin.

== Discography ==
1970

- Electronic Meditation (with Tangerine Dream)
- Klopfzeichen (with Kluster)

1971

- Zwei-Osterei (with Kluster)
- Schwarz (a.k.a. Eruption)

1973

- Rot
- Slowmotion

1974

- Blau
- Work in Progress
- The Red Cassette
- The Black Cassette

1978

- Con

1980

- Auf Dem Schwarzen Kanal (EP)
- Consequenz (with Wolfgang Seidel)
- Die wandelnde Klangwolke aus Berlin

1981

- Contempora
- Con 3
- Conrad & Sohn (with Gregor Schnitzler)
- Conal
- Control
- Gelb (reissue of The Black Cassette as an LP)
- Grün
- Context

1982

- Convex
- The Russians Are Coming (EP, with Peter Baumann)
- Container

1983

- Con 3.3.83

1984

- Con '84

1985

- Con '85

1986

- Concert
- Consequenz II (with Wolfgang Seidel)
- Micon in Italia (with Michael Otto)
- Face on Radio (with Wolfgang Hertz)
- Con '86
- GenCon Productions (with Gen Ken Montgomery)
- Conversion Day

1987

- Congratulacion
- Contrasts (with Wolfgang Hertz)
- Black Box 1987
- Contra-Terrene
- Conditions of the Gas Giant
- Deathcrush (Silvester Anfang intro) (with Mayhem)

1988

- ConGen: New Dramatic Electronic Music (with Gen Ken Montgomery)
- CS 1 – CS 13: January 1988 – December 1988
- Concho (with Michael Chocholak)
- GenCon Dramatic (GenCon Live) (with Gen Ken Montgomery)

1989

- Constellations
- CS 89/1 – CS 89/12: January 1989 – December 1989
- The Cassette Concert (with Gen Ken Montgomery)

1990

- Kynak (Camma) (with Giancarlo Toniutti)
- CS 90/1 – CS 90/12: January 1990 – December 1990
- Confidential Tapes
- 00/001 – 00/004: Confidential Tapes

1991

- Contempora 00/014 – 00/031

1992

- Tolling Toggle (with Jorg Thomasius)
- Tonart Eins (with Tonart)
- Ballet Statique (reissue of Con)
- Contempora 00/032 – 00/039

1993

- Clock Face (with Jorg Thomasius)
- Tonart Zwei (with Tonart)
- Con Brio
- Contempora 00/040 – 00/044

1994

- Blue Glow
- Con Repetizione
- Contempora 00/045 – 00/053

1995

- Charred Machinery
- Electronegativity

1997

- 00/106
- The Piano Works 1
- 00/44

1999

- Construction
- 00/071: Piano
- 00/063: Piano
- Con/Solo/1
- 00/121: Piano
- 00/139: Concert
- Con/Solo/2
- Computer Jazz

2000

- The 88 Game
- 5.5.85 (Concert)

2001

- Conal2001
- Acon (with Hans-Joachim Roedelius)
- 00/142-8 – MHz Records. Germany

2002

- Con '72

2003

- Live Action 1997
- Gold
- Contakt

2004

- Con '72 Part II

2005

- Mi.T.-Con 04 (with Michael Thomas Roe)

2006

- Moon Mummy
- Zug
- Aquatic Vine Music (with Michael Thomas Roe)
- Conviction
- Con 2+
- ElectroCon
- Klavierhelm
- Trigger Trilogy

2007

- Mic + Con 07 (with Michael Thomas Roe)

2008

- Kluster 2007 (with Michael Thomas Roe and Masato Ooyama)
- rare tracks 1979–1982 (with Remixes by Dompteur Mooner) Erkrankung durch Musique Records
- 20070709 (with Bernhard Woestheinrich)

2009

- Aquafit (with Big Robot) – Karisma. Norway
- Kluster 2008: Three Olympic Cities Mix (with Michael Thomas Roe and Masato Ooyama)
- Horror Odyssee (with Big Robot) – TIBProd. Italy

2010

- Kluster 2009: Three Voices (with Michael Thomas Roe and Masato Ooyama)

2011

- Consequenz 010B (with Wolfgang Seidel) – Mirror Tapes
- Kluster CMO 2010 (with Michael Thomas Roe and Masato Ooyama)
- Against The Grain (with Håvard Tveito, Ole Christensen, Kjetil Manheim, Johannes Stockhausen Hektoen, Fredrik Owesen, Tord Litleskare, Nils Martin Haugfoss, Marius Håndlykken, Shawn Ytterland and Vigleik Skogerbø)

2012

- Endtime

2015

- GEN CON Barbarella (with Gen Ken Montgomery, Arvo Zylo, Mama Baer, Kommissar Hjuler) – Psych.KG
- GEN CON FLUX (with Gen Ken Montgomery & Mama Baer, Kommissar Hjuler) – Psych.KG
- genconhjulachinsky (with Gen Ken Montgomery, Steve Dalachinsky & Kommissar Hjuler) – Psych.KG

2016

- Kontraktion (with Pharmakustik) – Rotorelief. France

2018

- Extruder (with Pharmakustik) – Rotorelief. France

2021

- Schubkraft (with Pharmakustik) – Rotorelief. France
