= Cluster (band) =

German musical duo

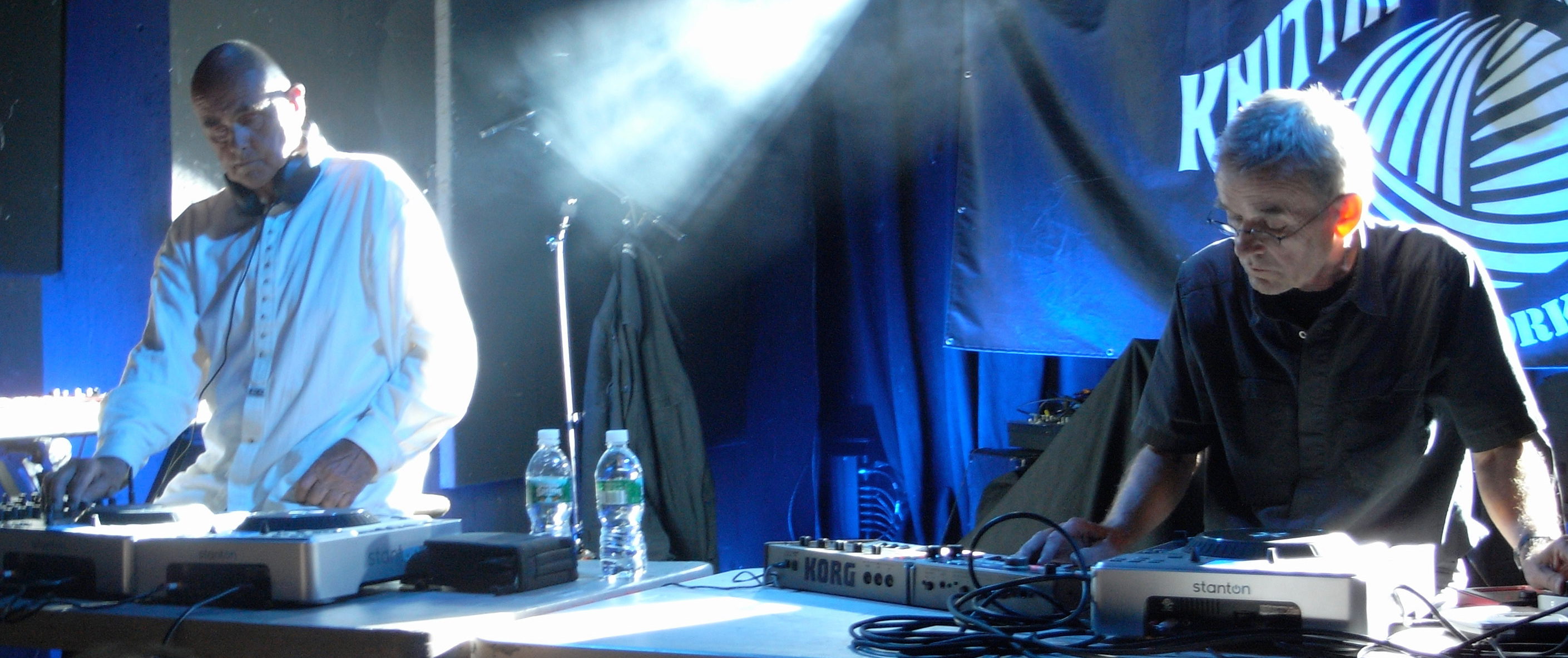
- Hans-Joachim Roedelius (left) and Dieter Moebius perform as Cluster in New York, 2008.

Background information
- Origin: Berlin, Germany
- Genres: Kosmische; krautrock; ambient; electronic pop; space rock
- Years active: 1971–1981, 1989–1997, 2007–2010
- Labels: Philips, Brain, Sky, YHR, Curious, Gyroscope, Purple Pyramid, Captain Trip, Bureau B
- Spinoffs: Moebius & Plank, Harmonia
- Spinoff of: Kluster
- Past members: Hans-Joachim Roedelius; Dieter Moebius; Conny Plank
- Website: Myspace: Roedelius/Cluster; Roedelius: official website

Cluster was a German musical duo consisting of Hans-Joachim Roedelius and Dieter Moebius, formed in 1971 and associated with West Germany's krautrock and kosmische music scenes. Originating from the earlier Berlin-based group Kluster, the duo relocated in 1971 to the countryside village of Forst, Lower Saxony, where they built a studio and collaborated with musicians such as Conny Plank, Brian Eno, and Michael Rother. With Rother, they formed the influential side project Harmonia. Cluster disbanded in 1981 but reunited twice, from 1989 to 1997 and again from 2007 to 2010.

AllMusic described Cluster as "the most important and consistently underrated space rock unit of the '70s." Music historian Julian Cope included three Cluster albums—Cluster II (1972), Zuckerzeit (1974), and Sowiesoso (1976)—in his Krautrock Top 50. The Wire included their debut album in its list of "One Hundred Records That Set the World on Fire".

== History ==
=== 1971–1972: Early works ===
Dieter Moebius, Hans-Joachim Roedelius, and Conrad Schnitzler formed Kluster in 1969 after meeting at the Zodiak Free Arts Lab. The trio released three albums: Klopfzeichen, Zwei-Osterei, and Eruption. After Schnitzler left the group, Roedelius and Moebius continued as Cluster. They were joined by Conny Plank for their self-titled debut album in 1971 but continued as a duo thereafter, working extensively with producer and engineer Plank until his death in 1987.

Cluster’s first release, Cluster (later reissued as Cluster '71), was released in 1971 on Philips. It marked the musicians' first major-label release; previous Kluster albums had been limited to small or private label pressings of no more than 300 copies. The album, along with its 1972 follow-up, served as a musical bridge between the avant-garde, discordant, proto-industrial sound of Kluster and the more structured ambient and rock-oriented styles of Cluster’s later work. Cluster '71 features little to no discernible melody or rhythm. AllMusic described it as "a dislocating, disorienting meld of random space music, industrial noise, proto-ambient atmospherics, feedback, and soundwash." This album is also the only Cluster release on which Conny Plank is credited as a full third member.

In 1972, Cluster signed with the influential Krautrock label Brain Records, a partnership that lasted until 1975. Plank continued to work with them as a producer and contributor, including on Cluster II, where he was credited as a composer and producer.

=== 1973–1979: Harmonia, Zuckerzeit, and Eno ===
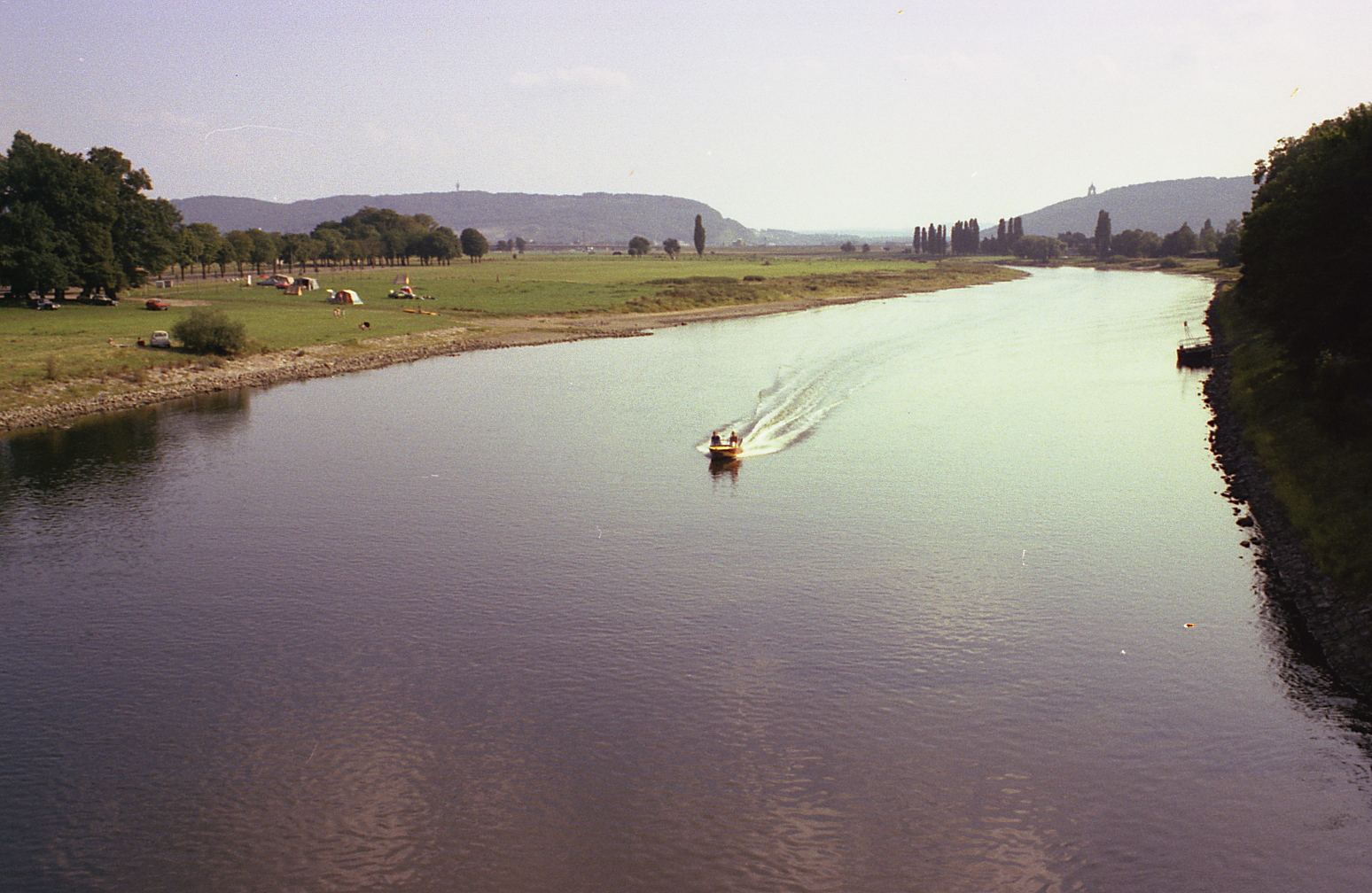
The duo lived and recorded near the Weser River, pictured here in 1977.

In 1971, the duo moved to the rural village of Forst, West Germany, where they lived in several Renaissance-era farmhouses and built their own studio. There, Cluster and Neu! co-founder Michael Rother recorded two albums under the name Harmonia: Musik von Harmonia (1974) and Deluxe (1975), both released on Brain Records. The trio also toured during this period, and a live recording from 1974 was later released as Live 1974 in 2007.

Following the release of Harmonia's debut album and a period of touring, Rother returned to working with Klaus Dinger and an expanded Neu! lineup to fulfill his contractual obligations. During his absence, Cluster resumed work as a duo, releasing Zuckerzeit later in 1974. Zuckerzeit marked a departure from Cluster’s earlier experimental sound, featuring structured melodies and rhythmic elements that at times reflected the Motorik style of Neu! Pitchfork placed Zuckerzeit at number 63 in its "Top 100 Albums of the 1970s".

After the release of Deluxe, Moebius, Roedelius, and Rother reunited in the studio in 1976 and collaborated with Brian Eno. The resulting album, Tracks and Traces, remained unreleased until 1997. Eno had been impressed with both Musik von Harmonia and Zuckerzeit and had previously joined Harmonia for a live performance at The Fabrik in Hamburg in 1974.

In a 1997 interview, Hans-Joachim Roedelius reflected on Rother’s influence on Cluster's musical direction in Zuckerzeit and later releases:

"Michael, as well as Eno, gave a lot and had a certain focus regarding our common work... Obviously working with Michael changed my and Moebius' focus. I don't know if Michael got the same benefit from working with us as we did working with him."

The period from 1976 to 1979 was Cluster's most productive, with four albums released during these years receiving significant critical acclaim. In 1976, Cluster also moved to the Hamburg-based Sky Records. Their first release for Sky, Sowiesoso, was recorded in just two days and featured softer, more melodic compositions.

In 1977, Cluster collaborated with Brian Eno at Conny Plank's studio. The first album from these sessions, Cluster & Eno, showcased a more ambient sound. Guest musicians included Can bassist Holger Czukay and synthesist Asmus Tietchens. The collaboration with Eno helped Cluster gain a wider international audience. A second album from these sessions, After the Heat (1978), displayed a broader range of styles, including three tracks featuring Eno's vocals. Holger Czukay played bass on one track, "Tzima N'arki," which incorporated reversed vocals from Eno's song "King's Lead Hat".

During this period, Roedelius also began releasing solo material, starting with Durch die Wüste in 1978.

Cluster's 1979 album Grosses Wasser, produced by former Tangerine Dream member Peter Baumann, featured a diverse range of styles. The title track, which occupied the entire second side of the LP, contained some of the most avant-garde material the duo had recorded since the dissolution of Kluster.

=== 1980–1989: Curiosum and related projects ===
On 12 June 1980, Cluster performed at the Wiener Festwochen Alternativ with Joshi Farnbauer. The performance was recorded and released as a limited-edition cassette on the British York House Records (YHR) label and later in Germany on the Transmitter label, owned by "Grüne Kraft" founder Werner Pieper. This sole Cluster & Farnbauer release was titled Live in Vienna. The music is highly experimental and discordant, reminiscent of Moebius and Roedelius' early work with Conrad Schnitzler in Kluster. Live in Vienna was not released on CD until 2010, although two sections, each between 15 and 16 minutes long, had previously been included as bonus tracks on the Hypnotic CD reissues of the first two Kluster albums, Klopfzeichen and Zwei-Osterei.

Also in 1980, Sky Records reissued Cluster's debut album with new artwork and the title Cluster '71. That same year, Dieter Moebius teamed up with former Cluster member, engineer, and producer Conny Plank on the album Rastakraut Pasta, released on Sky. A second Moebius & Plank album, Material, followed in 1981.

Cluster’s 1981 release, Curiosum, lived up to its name, with seven tracks of offbeat and unusual melodies. It was Cluster’s last album for Sky Records and marked their final collaboration before an eight-year hiatus.

During this break, both Moebius and Roedelius continued to record and tour, releasing solo albums and collaborating with other artists.

Moebius continued working with Conny Plank. Along with Guru Guru drummer Mani Neumeier, they recorded the African-influenced, rhythm-heavy album Zero Set, released by Sky in 1983. That same year, Moebius and Plank collaborated with Mayo Thompson to record Ludwig's Law, which remained unreleased until 1998. Their final collaboration, En Route, was recorded in 1986 but was not released until 1995 on Curious Music. Plank died of cancer in 1987.

Roedelius released numerous solo albums and collaborations during this period, continuing his Selbstportrait series of introspective ambient albums.

With no new material from Cluster, Sky Records released several compilations. The 1984 release Stimmungen featured material from Sowiesoso and Grosses Wasser. Two additional compilations, Begegnungen (1984) and Begegnungen II (1985), credited to Eno, Moebius, Roedelius, and Plank, included tracks from Sowiesoso, Cluster & Eno, and After the Heat, along with selections from Moebius and Roedelius' solo albums and the Moebius & Plank collaborations. Cluster also saw their first U.S. release in 1985 when Relativity Records issued Old Land, credited to Cluster and Brian Eno, featuring a mix of material from Cluster & Eno and After the Heat.

=== 1989–1997: First reunion ===
In 1989, Cluster reunited and began recording Apropos Cluster between 1989 and 1990. The album was released on the Curious Music label in 1991. Apropos Cluster is musically and structurally similar to Grosses Wasser, featuring four short tracks followed by a nearly 22-minute-long, more experimental title piece. It was Cluster's first album to be released initially in the U.S., followed by American reissues of their Sky and Brain catalog during the early to mid-1990s.

Cluster’s next album, One Hour, was released in 1995. It featured a single long musical piece—the longest ever recorded by Cluster—divided into 11 tracks on the CD. One Hour follows a structure similar to the title track of Grosses Wasser, with short, soft melodic sections at the beginning and end, sandwiching a longer experimental central section. It was the last studio album released by Cluster until 2009, marking a 14-year hiatus.

The liner notes for One Hour included a tribute to the late Konrad (Conny) Plank:

"However the most creative input and personal support over the years came from Konrad Plank, who was, in effect, a 'silent member in the background'."

In 1996, Cluster embarked on critically acclaimed concert tours in Japan and the United States—their first-ever U.S. tour. These tours resulted in two live albums: Japan 1996 Live, released in 1997 on the Japanese Captain Trip label, and First Encounter Tour 1996, recorded in the U.S. and released the same year on the American Purple Pyramid label. Tim Story, best known as a keyboardist and ambient music composer, co-produced Japan 1996 Live and produced First Encounter Tour 1996, beginning a musical association with Roedelius that would lead to future collaborations.

Following the U.S. tour, Roedelius and Moebius once again parted ways.

=== 1997–2007: Hiatus and second reunion ===
During the following decade, Moebius and Roedelius pursued various solo projects and collaborations.

Roedelius continued recording and touring with Aquarello, which released a self-titled live album in 1998. In 2000, he reunited with his former Kluster bandmate Conrad Schnitzler for the first time in nearly three decades, resulting in the album Acon 2000/1, released on Captain Trip in 2001. Roedelius also collaborated with Tim Story on two albums: The Persistence of Memory (2000) and Lunz (2002). In 2005, he released Neverless, a collaboration with Mott the Hoople alumnus Morgan Fisher. During this period, Roedelius recorded a total of 14 solo albums and three additional collaborative works.

Moebius recorded two solo albums during his second hiatus from Cluster: Blotch (1999) and Nurton (2006). He also performed and toured with his former Harmonia bandmate Michael Rother and contributed to the album by the Krautrock supergroup Amon Guru, which was released in 2007.

Moebius and Roedelius reunited for a performance at the Kosmische Club in Camden, London, on 15 April 2007. They also performed at the opening of documenta 12 on 15 June 2007 in Kassel, Germany, and at the fourth annual More Ohr Less festival in Lunz, Austria, on 10 August 2007. From September to November 2007, Cluster held additional concert performances in Germany, Switzerland, Norway, Estonia, and the Netherlands. Roedelius also gave a solo concert in Ojai, California, United States. Additionally, Moebius and Roedelius reunited with Michael Rother, and the first Harmonia concert in more than 30 years took place in Berlin on 27 November 2007.

Cluster performed in the United States for the first time since 1996, appearing at the Detroit Institute of Arts on 16 May 2008 and at the No Fun Fest at the Knitting Factory in New York City on 17 May 2008. They also performed four shows in California from 22 to 25 May.

In 2008, Cluster released their first album in over a decade, a live recording from their performance in Berlin on 14 September 2007, issued by Important Records.

On 21 March 2009, Cluster participated in a one-off live collaboration with Chrome Hoof in London. In May 2009, they released Qua, their first studio album in over a decade.

On 22 November 2009, Cluster supported Tortoise at the Royal Festival Hall in London.

On 17 November 2010, Roedelius announced via email and social media that Cluster would disband at the end of 2010. Their final concert took place in Minehead, Somerset, England, on 5 December 2010.

Following the breakup, Roedelius formed the project "Qluster" with musician Onnen Bock. A trilogy of albums was planned, with the first release arriving in May 2011.

== Musical style ==
Cluster's musical style varied greatly over their career. AllMusic described them as "the most important and consistently underrated space rock unit of the '70s," noting that they initially began as "an improv group that used everything from synthesizers to alarm clocks and kitchen utensils in their performances." Later, they transitioned to producing "many landmark LPs in the field of German space music, often termed kosmische."

With the release of Zuckerzeit in 1974, the group shifted toward a more structured and accessible sound, blending "trippy drum machine rhythms with woozy, pastoral melodies, resulting in a skewed, playful vision of futuristic pop." In the following decades, Cluster continued to explore various electronic and ambient music styles, influencing genres well into the 1990s.

Cluster has been widely influential, not only in ambient and electronic music but also in techno, electronica, and even popular music. Artists and groups influenced by Cluster include David Bowie, Robert Rich, John Foxx (formerly of Ultravox), and Alex Paterson of The Orb. Other notable acts that have drawn inspiration from Cluster include Coil, Oval, To Rococo Rot, and Mouse on Mars.

== Personnel ==
=== Core members ===
- Hans-Joachim Roedelius (1971–2010)
- Dieter Moebius (1971–2010)
- Conny Plank (as musician, 1971, as composer 1971–1972, as engineer/producer 1971–1978)

=== Other musicians ===
- Brian Eno (1977–1978) – synthesizer, vocals, producer, bass
- Holger Czukay (1977–1978) – bass
- Asmus Tietchens (1977) – synthesizer
- Okko Bekker (1977) – guitar
- Joshi Farnbauer (1980) – percussion
- Stanislaw Michalik (1990) – bass
- Bond Bergland – guitar (1996)
- Paul M. Fox (1996) – musician/engineer
- Tommy Grenas (Johnston) (1996) – musician

=== Production ===
- Peter Baumann (1979) – producer
- William Roper (1979) – engineer
- Felix Jay (1996) – producer
- Tim Story (1996–1997) – producer/engineer
- Hiroshi Okunari (1996) – engineer, Osaka
- Russ Curry (1996) – engineer

== Discography ==
=== Studio albums ===
- 1971 Cluster aka Cluster 71
- 1972 Cluster II
- 1974 Zuckerzeit
- 1976 Sowiesoso
- 1977 Cluster & Eno (with Brian Eno)
- 1978 After the Heat (by Eno, Moebius and Roedelius)
- 1979 Grosses Wasser
- 1981 Curiosum
- 1991 Apropos Cluster (by Moebius and Roedelius)
- 1995 One Hour
- 2009 Qua

=== Live albums ===
- 1980 Live in Vienna, 1980 (with Joshi Farnbauer)
- 1997 Japan 1996 Live
- 1997 First Encounter Tour 1996
- 2008 Berlin 07
- 2015 USA Live
- 2017 Konzerte 1972/1977

=== Compilation albums ===
- 1984 Begegnungen (with Brian Eno, Conny Plank)
- 1984 Stimmungen
- 1985 Begegnungen II (with Brian Eno, Conny Plank)
- 1985 Old Land (with Brian Eno)
- 2007 Box 1 (boxed set)

== See also ==
- List of ambient music artists
