= Asmus Tietchens =

German composer (born 1947)

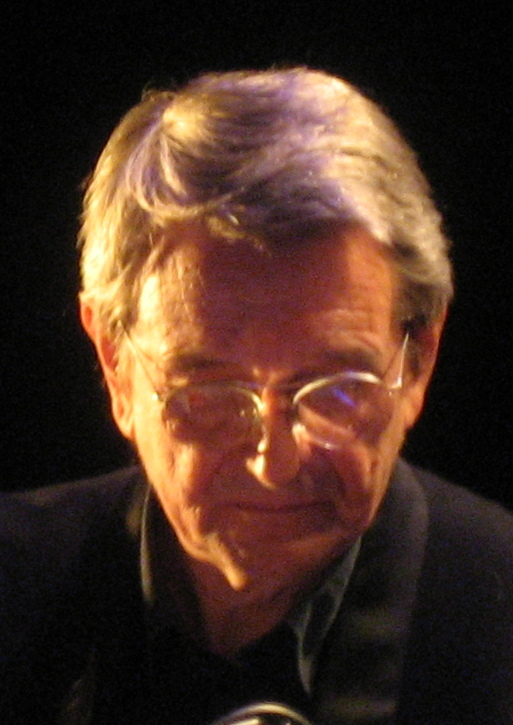
Asmus Tietchens.

Asmus Tietchens (born 3 February 1947, in Hamburg), who also records under the monikers Hematic Sunsets and Club of Rome, is a German composer of avant-garde music. Tietchens became interested in experimental music and musique concrète as a child, and began recording sound experiments in 1965 with electronic musical instruments, synthesizers and tape loops. In the 1970s he met producer Okko Bekker, and the two formed a decades-long partnership. Peter Baumann (of Tangerine Dream) heard a recording of Tietchens' music and offered to produce an album; the result was Nachtstücke, Tietchens' 1980 offering on Egg Records. His early recordings feature more accessible synthesized music, but beginning with Formen Letzer Hausmusik, his 1984 release for Nurse With Wound's label United Dairies, he began moving toward more abstract sound collages. He has taught acoustics in Hamburg since 1990.

== Discography ==
- 1978 Liliental with Liliental
- 1980 Nachtstücke
- 1981 Biotop
- 1981 Musik aus der Grauzone
- 1982 Spät-Europa
- 1982 In die Nacht
- 1982 Musik im Schatten
- 1982 Musik an der Grenze
- 1983 Litia
- 1983 Musik unter Tage
- 1984 Formen letzter Hausmusik
- 1985 Seuchengebiete
- 1985 Cripple Story
- 1985 Große Statik as Club of Rome
- 1986 Geboren um zu dienen
- 1986 Watching the Burning Bride with Terry Burrows
- 1987 Zwingburgen des Hedonismus
- 1987 Notturno
- 1988 Aus Freunde am Elend
- 1988 Face to Face, Vol. 1 Split with Die Form
- 1988 E with Okko Bekker
- 1988 Linea
- 1989 Abfleischung
- 1989 Marches funébres
- 1990 Stupor Mundi
- 1991 Sinkende Schwimmer
- 1991 Grav with PGR and Merzbow
- 1991 Monoposto with C.V. Liquidsky
- 1991 Raum 318
- 1992 Seuchengebiete 2
- 1992 Daseinsverfehlung
- 1992 Five Manifestoes with PBK
- 1993 Das Fest ist zu Ende. Aus
- 1993 DBL_FDBK with Arcane Device
- 1994 Die Nacht aus Blei
- 1995 Eisgang
- 1995 Asmus Tietchens. Vidna Obmana with Vidna Obmana
- 1995 Itineraire with Frans de Waard, Achim Wollscheid, Giancarlo Toniutti, and Bernhard Günter
- 1996 Ptomaine
- 1996 Das Vieh und sein Vater
- 1996 Speiseleitung with Arcane Device
- 1996 Rattenheu
- 1996 Papier ist geduldig
- 1997 Dämmerattacke
- 1998 Seuchengebiete 3
- 1998 Burning the Watching Bride with Terry Burrows
- 1998 Repetitive Movement with Achim Wollscheid
- 1998 Musik aus dem Aroma Club as Hematic Sunsets
- 1999 Glimmen
- 1999 Motives for Recycling with Vidna Obmana
- 1999 6.9.1998
- 1999 Stockholmer Totentanz with Okko Bekker
- 1999 Was bleibt
- 1999 Phosphor
- 1999 Von Mund zu Mund 1
- 1999 Schritt Um Schritt split with Robert Rutman
- 2000 Rendezvouz im Aroma Club as Hematic Sunsets
- 2000 Von Mund zu Mund 2
- 2000 Alpha-Menge
- 2000 Von Mund zu Mund 3
- 2000 Kapotte Muziek by Asmus Tietchens
- 2000 The Scorpions. Studio-Outtakes 1–6, 7–15 Split with Felix Kubin
- 2001 Kontakt der Jünglinge 1 with Thomas Köner
- 2001 Beta-Menge
- 2001 Flussdichte with David Lee Myers
- 2001 Kontakt der Jünglinge 0 with Thomas Köner
- 2002 The Shifts Recyclings with Vidna Obmana
- 2002 Gamma-Menge
- 2002 Leuchtidioten
- 2002 Kontakt der Jünglinge -1 with Thomas Köner
- 2003 Sieben Stücke with Jon Mueller
- 2003 Heidelberger Studien 1–6
- 2003 Kontakt der Jünglinge n with Thomas Köner
- 2003 Delta-Menge
- 2003 Hunde I with Xyramat and TBC
- 2003 FT+
- 2004 Frühruin with Thomas Köner
- 2004 6000 with David Lee Myers
- 2004 Zu Gast im Aromaclub as Hematic Sunsets, with Gästen
- 2004 Hunde II with Jetzmann and TBC
- 2004 Weihnachten im Aroma Club as Hematic Sunsets with Okko Bekker
- 2004 Eine ganze Menge
- 2005 Epsilon-Menge
- 2006 Verstreutes 2
- 2006 Zwei Stücke
- 2006 Zeta-Menge
- 2007 4K7
- 2007 Musik hinter Glas
- 2007 Fabrication with Richard Chartier
- 2007 Prefabrication
- 2007 YAK with Y-Ton-G und Kouhei Matsunaga
- 2007 Weihnachten im Aroma Club 2007 as Hematic Sunsets
- 2007 Acht Stücke with Jon Mueller
- 2007 Eta-Menge
- 2008 Teils Teils
- 2009 Aroma Club Paradox as Hematic Sunsets
- 2009 Eine Menge Papier
- 2009 3 Wishes Split with Stefanie Ressin
- 2009 Flächen mit Figuren
- 2010 Fabrication 2 with Richard Chartier
- 2010 Abraum
- 2011 Soirée
- 2011 Untitled Split with Kouhei Matsunaga
- 2012 Moebius + Tietchens with Dieter Moebius
- 2013 Tarpenbek
- 2013 Fast ohne Titel, Korrosion
- 2014 Humoresken Und Vektoren
