= Sky Records =

German record label

- Founded: 1975
- Founder: Günter Körber
- Defunct: 1997
- Status: defunct
- Distributor(s): self-distributed
- Genre: Electronic, krautrock, progressive rock, experimental, industrial, ambient
- Country of origin: Germany
- Location: Hamburg

Sky Records was an independent record label specializing in krautrock/Kosmische Musik and electronic music. They were based in Hamburg, Germany. Some of their releases could be classified as progressive rock or art rock, experimental music, industrial, ambient, or new age. No new releases appeared after 1998.

== History ==
Sky Records was founded in 1975 by Günter Körber after he left Metronome Musik, the parent company of influential krautrock/Kosmische label Brain Records. Körber was able to sign several former Brain Records recording artists to his new label, most notably Cluster just as they began a successful collaboration with Brian Eno. The success of the albums Cluster & Eno in 1977 and After the Heat in 1978 helped put Sky on a solid financial footing. Other former Brain artists signing with Sky included Thirsty Moon and Michael Rother shortly after his departure from Neu! and Harmonia.

Along with several subsequent Cluster albums, group members Dieter Moebius and Hans-Joachim Roedelius also released several solo albums and collaborations on Sky. Other notable artists who recorded for the label include Conrad Schnitzler, Asmus Tietchens, Harald Grosskopf, Adelbert von Deyen, Nik Tyndall, Earthstar, Serge Blenner, Insane Jane, and Dieter Schütz. The 1990s mainly saw reissues of earlier albums from the catalog on CD. The label was dissolved in 1997. Günter Körber died in 2013.

Many of the label's original releases have since been reissued on the Bureau B label.

== See also ==
- List of record labels
- List of electronic music record labels
