= Aquarello =

Austrian-Italian musical group

- Origin: Austria, Italy
- Genres: Jazz; Ambient music
- Years active: 1991–1998
- Labels: Materiali Sonori, Deep Wave, All Saints
- Past members: Hans-Joachim Roedelius; Fabio Capanni; Nicola Alesini
- Website: Myspace: Roedelius/Cluster/Aquarello; Roedelius: Official Website

Aquarello was a musical group which blended ambient music and jazz. The trio included keyboardist Hans-Joachim Roedelius, based in Austria, and two Italian musicians, multi-instrumentalist Fabio Capanni, and saxophonist Nicola Alesini. They were active between 1991 and 1998, recording and releasing three albums.

== Overview ==
=== Core members ===
- Hans-Joachim Roedelius (1991–1998)
- Fabio Capanni (1991–1998)
- Nicola Alesini (1991–1998)

=== Collaborators ===
- Arlo Bigazzi - recorder, bass guitar, nature sounds, mixing. Producer. (1992)
- Laszlo von Ramhorst - percussion, bass, keyboards, harmonica, flute. (1993)
- Felix Jay - electric piano and keyboards. (1993)

== History ==
The first Aquarello album, Friendly Game, was released under the three artists' names but is listed as the debut Aquarello album in the discography on Roedelius' official website. Fabio Capanni played a wide variety of instruments on the album, including electric and acoustic guitar, piano, synthesizer, marranzano, and bouzuki. The trio were joined by Arlo Bigazzi on Friendly Game, who in addition to serving as producer, played recorder and bass. He also co-wrote the song "Fiori" with Roedelius and Capanni and share arranger credits with the three members of Aquarello. Friendly Game was released by the Italian label Materiali Sonori in 1992.

Their second album To Cover the Dark, was their first release under the Aquarello name. It was released in 1993 on the British Deep Wave label, the trio were joined by multi-instrumentalist Laszlo von Ramhorst and keyboardist Felix Jay. von Ramhorst played percussion, bass, keyboards, harmonica, and flute on the album.

Aquarello's third, eponymous album was released in 1998 on the U.K.-based All Saints label. It was the only album on which just the trio played with no additional musicians collaborating. 12 of the 14 tracks were recorded live at the Visual Music Festival VI in Lanzarote and most of this material are live versions of pieces which appeared on the first two albums.

== Discography ==
- 1992 : Friendly Game (studio album, as Roedelius, Capanni, Alesini)
- 1993 : To Cover The Dark (studio album)
- 1998 : Aquarello (live album)
