= Kosmische Musik =

Music genre

- Other names: Kosmische music; cosmic music
- Stylistic origins: Krautrock; Düsseldorf School; Berlin School; electronic; psychedelia; space rock; avant-garde; tape music
- Cultural origins: Late 1960s – early 1970s, West Germany
- Derivative forms: Ambient; new age; progressive electronic; new musick; post-noise; nu-new age

Subgenres
- Neo-kosmische

Other topics
- Space music; art rock

Kosmische Musik ("cosmic music") is a music genre of 1970s German electronic music which makes extensive use of synthesizers and incorporates themes related to space or otherworldliness; it is also used as a German analogue to the English term "space rock". The term was coined in 1971 by Edgar Froese and later used by record producer Rolf-Ulrich Kaiser as a marketing term for bands such as Ash Ra Tempel, Tangerine Dream, and Klaus Schulze.

The term is often used synonymously with krautrock, though it often rejected the rock music conventions of krautrock groups. It was coined and in regular use before "krautrock" and was preferred by some German artists who disliked the English label. The style was influential to the development of new age, progressive electronic, new musick, post-noise and ambient music. In the 2000s, American post-noise musicians such as Emeralds, prompted a wave of millennial interest in 1970s kosmische Musik, inspiring a musical style known as neo-kosmische.

== Characteristics ==
Kosmische Musik was often instrumental and characterized by "spacy", ambient soundscapes. Artists used synthesizers such as the EMS VCS 3 and Moog Modular, as well as sound processing effects and tape-based approaches. They often rejected rock music conventions, and instead drew on "serious" electronic compositions.

== Etymology ==
The term "kosmische Musik" was coined in 1971 by Edgar Froese and later used by record producer Rolf-Ulrich Kaiser as a marketing term for bands such as Ash Ra Tempel, Tangerine Dream, and Klaus Schulze. The following year, Rolf-Ulrich Kaiser's Ohr Records used the term when he released the compilation Kosmische Musik (1972) featuring tracks by Tangerine Dream, Klaus Schulze, Ash Ra Tempel, and Popol Vuh. Kaiser eventually began referring to the style as "cosmic rock" to signify that the music belonged in a rock idiom. German producer Conny Plank was a central figure in the kosmische sound, emphasizing texture, effects processing, and tape-based editing techniques. Plank oversaw recordings such as Kraftwerk's Autobahn, Neu!'s Neu! '75, and Cluster's Zuckerzeit.

Several of these artists would later distance themselves from the term. Other names for the style, and for sub-genres were "Berlin School" and "Düsseldorf School", both of which are recognised and actively contributed to by artists such as Node, Martin Sturtzer, Propaganda, Kraftwerk, Tannheuser and Fritz Mayr, from the 1980s through to the present day. The style would later lead to the development of new-age music, with which it shared several characteristics. It would also exert lasting influence on subsequent electronic music and avant-garde rock.

== Related genres ==
=== Neo-kosmische ===
Neo-kosmische
- Stylistic origins: Kosmische musik; post-noise; new age; ambient
- Cultural origins: 2000s, United States

Other topics
- Nu-new age

Neo-kosmische is a label which has been used to refer to post-noise group Emeralds, who "prompted a wave of millennial interest in kosmische Musik (Deuter, Klaus Schulze, Cluster et al)". The term was also used by Pitchfork to label Brooklyn band Titan. According to the Village Voice, around 2006, Lopatin stated that the Brooklyn noise scene began to discuss the work of Klaus Schulze. Initially Lopatin was considered an outcast in the scene for introducing "'70s cosmic trance music and '80s new age" into noise music. However, Emeralds and other acts felt a "boredom with noise, a sense we'd done it: We get this emotion".

In 2012, neo-kosmische would be used as a term by British magazine Fact. That same year, Canadian magazine Exclaim! referred to Daniel Lopatin on the collaborative album Instrumental Tourist as "neo-kosmische noodling". By December, The Quietus published a review of Bee Mask's When We Were Eating Unripe Pears by Rory Gibb, where he associated the term "neo-kosmische" with post-noise, stating "Of all the neo-kosmische/post-noise explorers whose balmy currents have lapped at our shores over the past few years, Chris Madak is among the few who seem hellbent on mapping out genuinely new territory." In 2025, Pitchfork stated that Lopatin "was at the vanguard of the American noise scene in the hazy years when it retreated from feedback-soaked harshness into an unkanny kosmische".

== See also ==
- Nu-new age
- Motorik
