= Reznik =

Reznik (Russian: Резник, Ukrainian: Рєзник) is a surname derived from Russian reznik ("butcher") or Yiddish reznik (רזניק, borrowed from a Slavic language, "Kosher slaughterer" (shochet)).

== People ==
- Anjelika Reznik (born 1995), Canadian rhythmic gymnast
- Henri Reznik (born 1938), Russian celebrity lawyer
- Ilya Reznik (born 1938), Russian poet and songwriter
- Kateryna Reznik (born 1995), Ukrainian synchronized swimmer
- Kirill Reznik (born 1974), Ukraine-born American politician
- Maxim Reznik (born 1974), Russian politician
- Mykhailo Reznik (1950–2025), Ukrainian diplomat
- Semyon Reznik (born 1938), Russian writer
- Stepan Reznik (born 1983), Russian football player and coach
- Valeriya Reznik (born 1985), Russian speed skater
- Vera Reznik (born 1944), Russian writer and translator
- Victoria Reznik (born 1995), Canadian rhythmic gymnast
- Vladislav Reznik (born 1954), Russian businessman and politician
- Yuri Reznik (born 1954), Ukrainian footballer

== Fictional characters ==
- Morgan Reznik, character in The Good Doctor (TV series)
- Servath Reznik, character in the tabletop game Warmachine
- Tracy Reznik, character in the game Identity V
- Trevor Reznik, character in the movie The Machinist

== See also ==
- Resnik (disambiguation)
- Řezník
- Resnick
- Resnik (surname)
- Reznikov
