= Reznikoff =

Reznikoff is a surname. Notable people with the surname include:

- Charles Reznikoff (1894–1976), American poet
- Misha Reznikoff (1905–1971), American-Ukrainian artist
- Maria Westdickenberg, also published as Maria G. Reznikoff, American-German mathematician

== See also ==
- Resnikoff
- Reznikov
