= Rasnick =

Rasnick is a surname. Notable people with the surname include:

- David Rasnick (born 1948), American biochemist
- Rick Rasnick (1959–2019), American football coach

== See also ==
- Resnick
- Resnik (surname)
