= Biotop =

Studio album by Asmus Tietchens
- Released: 1981
- Studio: Audiplex Studios
- Genre: Electronic pop; synth-pop; alternative music
- Length: 40:59
- Label: Sky Records
- Producer: Rokko Ekbek

Asmus Tietchens chronology
Nachtstucke (1980)	Biotop (1981)	Spät-Europa (1982)

Biotop is the second album by German electronic musician Asmus Tietchens, released in 1981 on Sky Records. Tietchens recorded the album at Audiplex Studios with producer and mentor Okko Bekker, who is credited as Rokko Ekbek. Departing from the musical style of the musician's debut album Nachtstucke (1980), Biotop contains sixteen short electronic pop tracks that are characterised by their immediate nature but unusual synth lines, tones and melodies. Bekker compared the music to radio time signals. Indeed, the liner notes state the album was performed by Das Zeitzeichenorchester, which translates to The Time-Signal Orchestra, although in reality this is an alias for Tietchens, the album's only performer.

The first of four albums Tietchens recorded for Sky Records, Biotop was released to general acclaim, although it sat in obscurity. It was remastered and re-released on CD with bonus material via Die Stadt in 2003, bringing it renewed critical attention, and again via Bureau B in 2013. Retrospective critics have posed the album as a predecessor to the IDM and electropop styles.

== Background and production ==
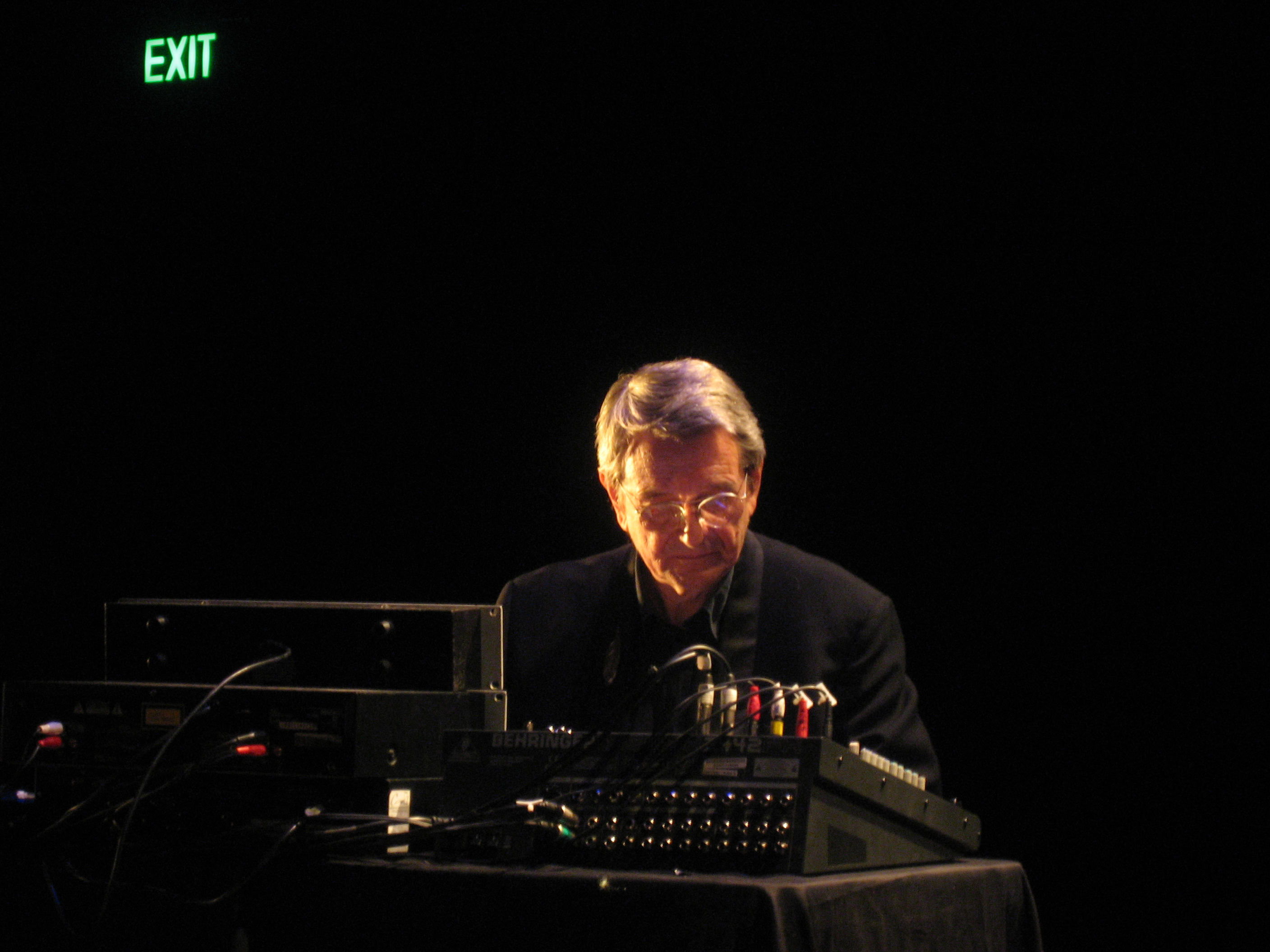
Asmus Tietchens in Sydney, 2009.

Asmus Tietchens began making experimental electronic music in 1965, and several years later purchased a MiniMoog. Nonetheless, he did not issue an album until Nachtstücke (1980), produced by Peter Baumann of Tangerine Dream and released on French label Egg Records, although the musician had recorded a tape music album with Okko Bekker and Hans Dieter Wohlmann in the mid-late 1960s entitled Adventures in Sound, which remained unreleased until published in a double album set with Nachtstucke. Biotop was the musician's second official album. His intention for the album was to write tracks with no bass lines, in order to "erase any commercial potential the record might have."

Okko Bekker (under the pseudonym Rokko Ekbek) produced the album, which was recorded at Audiplex Studios, where it was also mixed by Bekker. In the liner notes, Tietchens jokes that the album was recorded with his backing band Das Zeitzeichenorchester (roughly translated as "The Time-Signal Orchestra"). The names of the musicians in the imagined band are anagrams of the musician's own name, including Stu 'The Cute' Sins. Among the electronic equipment used by Tietchens on the album are a ring modulator, flanger and harmonizer.

== Composition ==
Biotop is a quirky electronic album dominated by usage of the CompuRhythm drum machine and synthesizers. The tracks are short, and most run for under three minutes, but Tietchens' "warped sense" of melody, wherein synth lines and notes slip out of tune and "out of control," stops the music from being simple. Brainwashed wrote that each of the tracks on the "quirky pop" album is a "rich, two-minute exercise in Tietchens' inimitable melodic style, filtered through vintage synths and drum machines." Writer Dominique Leone commented on Tietchens' "mastery of highbrow composition guised in synth-pop's veneer" and described the album's tracks as loopy études which take the form of "short, immediately distinctive electro-snap jingles." Tietchens' mentor Okko Bekker compared the music's "sparse and concise nature" to radio time signals. Although most of the music is light in tone, this style is offset by several unsettling explorations into ambient music, such as "Miss Ann Trope" and the title track. Indeed, the album has been described as having a detached, claustrophobic feel.

"Blutmund" features dirty synth tones and queasy harmonies. According to Leone, "Modern Arroganz" takes synth-pop to its "logical endpoint" by incorporating staccato snares and "uptempo robo-funk" overlaid with minimal hits of the Moog synthesiser alongside computerised vocals. With its bossa nova-influenced sound and glacial synths, "Trümmerköpfe" features exotica-styled sound effects in a style similar to Juan García Esquivel and a cha-cha 4/4 beat. Although the track's plonky lead melody is mostly a synth line, a jarring interval briefly occurs when it jumps "a 6th and a bit," a contrast from the tonality that characterises the rest of the piece. Throughout its three minutes, "Sekundentanz" poses an electronic take on spectralism, with a droning cluster working through intensely different tones. The title track is among the more experimental tracks, opening with a singular note which expands to incorporate overtones from a variety of synthesizer technology that Leone recons "most musicians probably haven't even explored now, much less in 1981." As the increasing amount of fuzzy ambient layers obscure the original tone, the sounds suddenly recede.

== Release and reception ==
Professional ratings
Review scores
Source	Rating
AllMusic	4/5 stars
Pitchfork	8.5/10

Biotop was released by Sky Records in 1981 as the label's 57th album release. The album cover was credited to "Tina Tuschemess". Stylistically consistent with other Tietchens albums like Litia (1983), the artwork for Biotop features no photographs of Tietchen. In a contemporary review for German magazine Pardon, Venske Henning recommended Biotop and felt that "Tietchens produces for himself and for people with imagination." He believed the album would be suited for Pink Floyd fans and listeners who felt the boundaries of "electronic sounds and noises" had yet to be furthered. Having been long unavailable on CD, Biotop was remastered and released on the format in 2003 by the Die Stadt label as the second in a series of 18 CDs covering Tietchen's early material. This version adds two previously unreleased bonus tracks entitled "Futurum Drei" and "Fast Food". On 20 August 2013, the album was re-released as a 180-gram vinyl by record label Bureau B.

Among retrospective reviews, François Couture of AllMusic considered Biotop to be a "big leap" from Tietchens' debut album. He felt the musician's "unpredictability" had kept the album "fresh" over time despite the aged technology it uses, writing that "[y]ou simply cannot tell where these short tunes (nothing over four minutes, most under three) will go, even if they appear to be simple, even simplistic." Dominique Leone of Pitchfork cited Biotop as his favourite Tietchens album and recommended it for fans of "futuristic pop" bands Kraftwerk and Cluster. He wrote that the album was a "delight" from the most "consistently enjoyable" period of Tietchen's career, and hoped it would turn him into a household name among "houses that already hold modern-day groups like Mouse on Mars, Kammerflimmer Kollektief and even The Notwist in high esteem."

In their review, Brainwashed felt that Biotop ventured further into "the quirky pop idiom" only hinted at with Tietchen's debut album, commenting that it "[weaves] heady, claustrophobic atmospherics in and out of each robotic beat and dated synth whirl." They praised how the album "keeps a bizarre, grainy distance" even during its most bouncy moments, "invoking the kind of antique futurism groups like Trans Am wish they had it in them to create," and although they felt the personality of Tietchens' later works was absent, the album is nonetheless "a fascinating, elusive little creation, valuable apart from its status as a document of the brilliant musician's formative years." Kev Nickells of Freq reviewed the record alongside its Sky Records follow-up Spät-Europa (1982); he felt both albums were "historically important" and "an important snapshot of a time in synths" which remain engaging on their own terms. He considered Biotop to have an unusual sound, highlighting the "perpetual sense that minor keys can sound a lot more unpleasant when the body of the note is missing a few critical overtones or has some filter/envelope on it that makes the square waves entirely revolting."

== Legacy ==
"[Biotop] sounded like the work of a composer obviously at home with discordant textures and off-kilter beats, yet had a patchwork, DIY charm belying his pedigree as a "serious" composer."

— Dominique Leone, Pitchfork

Biographer John Bush of AllMusic cites Biotop as the first in a period of "surprisingly accessible electronic pop" albums by Tietchens that continued for three further albums – Spät-Europa, In die Nacht and Litia – also released on the Sky Records label. In a 1995 interview, Tietchens said: "The four Sky albums were a brief period, a short trip into the fields of electronic pseudo-pop. I never did such things before." In a 2005 Pitchfork article, Leone wrote that Biotop highlighted Tietchen's often-overlooked role in the development of electronic pop, saying that although the album's "discordant textures and off-kilter beats" were characteristic of the composer, the music's do-it-yourself ethos belied his reputation as a "serious" composer.

Leone also commented that Biotop was crucial to the development of IDM, while Couture commented that the album predicted the electropop of 2000s acts like Felix Kubin and Reznicek. "Blutmund" was reportedly an influence on The Fall's song "I Am Damo Suzuki", from the group's acclaimed album This Nation's Saving Grace (1985). In 2018, musician Helena Hauff named Biotop as one of her thirteen favourite albums in a list for The Quietus. She said: "It's so ahead of its time, and it still sounds so fresh and modern and not in any way dated. It still sounds like the vision of the future." She felt the "versatile" album had "so many ideas and feelings" that were suitable for a variety of her DJ mixes, and commented that "all the ideas are not totally thought through, which is a good quality. It's kind of open, you can kind of finish the idea."

== Track listing ==
All tracks written by Asmus Tietchens.

=== Original vinyl release ===
==== Side one ====
1. "In Die Zukunft" – 2:23
2. "Miss Ann Trope" – 2:04
3. "Die Elektrische Horde" – 2:04
4. "Räuschlinge" – 3:59
5. "Geisel Des Monats" – 2:30
6. "Blutmund" – 2:23
7. "Cretin Statique" – 2:33
8. "Gasmaske in Blau" – 2:24

==== Side two ====
9. "Moderne Arroganz" – 2:38
10. "Stressmen" – 2:05
11. "Tango Fellatino" – 2:34
12. "Sauberland" – 2:03
13. "Trümmerköpfe" – 2:04
14. "Sekundentanz" – 3:31
15. "Träumchen Am Fenster" – 2:31
16. "Biotop" – 3:12

=== 2003 CD release ===
1. "Futurum Drei" – 4:50
2. "Fast Food" – 3:55
3. "In Die Zukunft" – 2:23
4. "Miss Ann Trope" – 2:04
5. "Die Elektrische Horde" – 2:04
6. "Räuschlinge" – 3:59
7. "Geisel Des Monats" – 2:30
8. "Blutmund" – 2:23
9. "Cretin Statique" – 2:33
10. "Gasmaske in Blau" – 2:24
11. "Moderne Arroganz" – 2:38
12. "Stressmen" – 2:05
13. "Tango Fellatino" – 2:34
14. "Sauberland" – 2:03
15. "Trümmerköpfe" – 2:04
16. "Sekundentanz" – 3:31
17. "Träumchen Am Fenster" – 2:31
18. "Biotop" – 3:12

== Personnel ==
Credits adapted from the original liner notes (many of the musicians are aliases of Tietchens).

- Asmus Tietchens – electronics, composition
- Das Zeitzeichenorchester – performer
- Stu 'Snatch' Seemi – drum programming
- Mischa Suttense – harmoniser, flanger
- Achim Stutessen – ring-modulator
- Rokko Ekbek – producing, mixing
- Hans Tim Cessteu – synthesiser
- Sam 'The Cute' Sins – synthesiser, effects
- Tussi Schemante – synthesiser, voice
- Tina Tuschemess – cover
- PF – lacquer cut
