= HBZ =

HBZ may refer to:

- Croatian Fraternal Union Avenue (Croatian: Avenija Hrvatske bratske zajednice, Avenija HBZ), in Zagreb, Croatia
- Habib Bank AG Zurich
- Heber Springs Municipal Airport, in Arkansas, United States
- Hemoglobin subunit zeta, encoded by the HBZ gene
- Hazza bin Zayed Stadium, in Al Ain, United Arab Emirates
- HBz, German DJ duo
