= Řezníček =

Řezníček (feminine: Řezníčková) is a Czech patronymic surname, a diminutive from 'Řezník' and here meaning "Řezník junior". Notable people with the surname include:

- Barbora Řezníčková (born 1989), Czech-Austrian former ice dancer
- Dalibor Řezníček (1991), Czech ice hockey player
- Emil von Reznicek (1860–1945), Austrian composer
- Ferdinand von Řezníček (1868–1909), Austrian painter and illustrator
- Franz Reznicek (born 1903, date of death unknown), Austrian architect
- Jakub Řezníček (born 1988), Czech footballer
- Milan Řezníček (born 1947), Czech volleyball player
- Pavel Řezníček (1942–2018), Czech writer
