= Resnik =

Resnik may refer to:

== People ==
- Resnik (surname), including a list of people with the name

== Places ==
=== Bosnia and Herzegovina ===
- Resnik (Hadžići), a village near Sarajevo
- Resnik (Višegrad), a village near Višegrad

=== Croatia ===
- Resnik, Požega-Slavonia County, a village
- Resnik Bosiljevski, a village near Bosiljevo
- Resnik, Zagreb, a settlement part of the Peščenica – Žitnjak district
- Resnik, Kaštela, a section of Kaštel Štafilić

=== Montenegro ===
- Resnik, Montenegro, near Bijelo Polje

=== Serbia ===
- Resnik, Belgrade, an urban neighborhood of Belgrade
- Resnik, Kragujevac, a village near Kragujevac
- Resnik, Babušnica, a village near Pirot
- Resnik (Sokobanja), a village near Sokobanja

=== Slovenia ===
- Resnik, Zreče, a village in the municipality of Zreče

== Other uses ==
- Resnik (crater), a lunar crater southwest of McAuliffe
- 3356 Resnik, an asteroid
- FK Resnik, a football club based in Resnik, Serbia

== See also ==
- Resnick, a surname
