= Arnold Resnicoff =

American military chaplain

Arnold E. Resnicoff
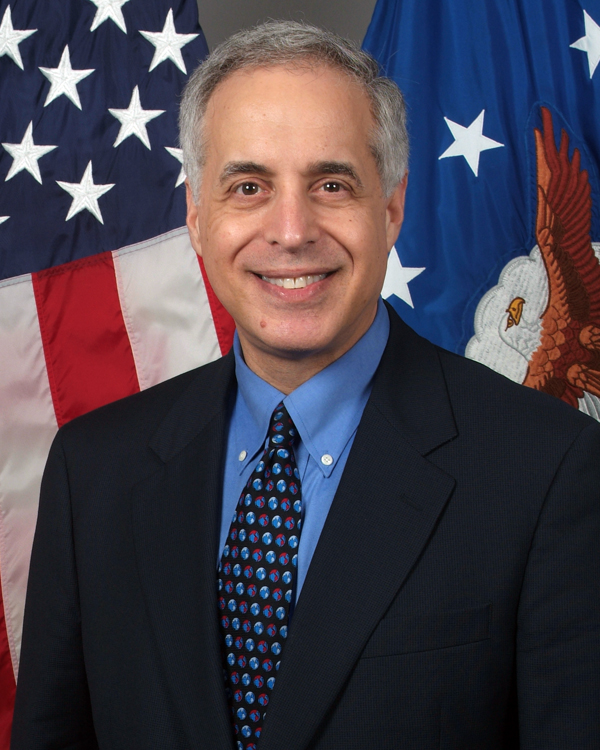
- Rabbi Arnold E. Resnicoff

Personal life
- Born: October 10, 1946 (age 80) Washington, D.C., U.S.
- Children: Malka Sarit Resnicoff
- Parent(s): Jack Irwin Resnicoff & Blanche Florence Hasinsky
- Website: www.resnicoff.net

Religious life
- Religion: Judaism
- Ordination: Rabbi, Jewish Theological Seminary of America, 1976

Jewish leader
- Present post: Consultant, Interfaith values and interreligious affairs
- Previous post: Command Chaplain, U.S. European Command; U.S. National Director, Interreligious Affairs, American Jewish Committee; Special Assistant for Values and Vision, Secretary and Chief of Staff, U.S. Air Force

Arnold E. Resnicoff (born 1946) is an American Conservative rabbi who served as a military officer and military chaplain. He served in Vietnam and Europe before attending rabbinical school. He then served in the United States Navy Chaplain Corps for almost 25 years, ultimately attaining the rank of captain. He promoted the creation of the Vietnam Veterans Memorial and delivered the closing prayer at its 1982 dedication. In 1984 the President of the United States spoke on his eyewitness account of the 1983 Beirut barracks bombing. After retiring from the military he was National Director of Interreligious Affairs for the American Jewish Committee and served as Special Assistant (for Values and Vision) to the Secretary and Chief of Staff of the United States Air Force, serving at the civilian grade equivalent to brigadier general.

Resnicoff holds several degrees, including an honorary doctorate. His awards include the Defense Superior Service Medal, the Department of the Air Force Decoration for Exceptional Civilian Service, and the Chapel of Four Chaplains Hall of Heroes Gold Medallion. In March 2026 he was named as one of the inaugural recipients of the Vietnam Veterans Memorial "Service Beyond Service" award, honoring Vietnam veterans who continued to serve their nation following their return from the war.

== Life and works ==
=== Early military career ===
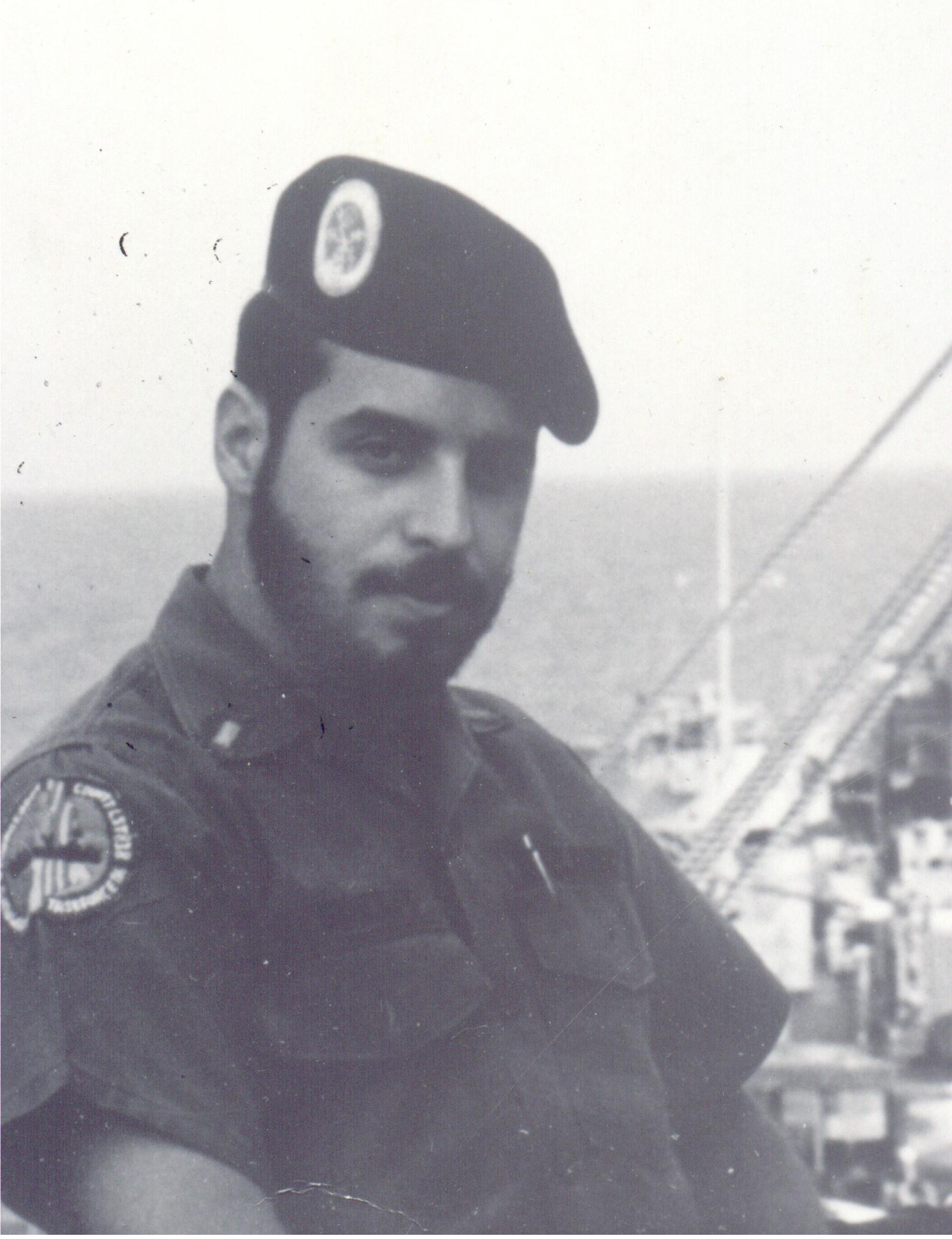
Vietnam, 1970

Resnicoff's father, a World War II Navy veteran, encouraged Resnicoff to serve with the military as one way for the family to "pay its dues" to America. He served as an enlisted man in the Naval Reserves during High School, then after graduation from NROTC at Dartmouth College served in the rivers of Vietnam (and a short time in Cambodia as well, when his ship became the first U.S commissioned vessel to cross the border) as part of "Operation Game Warden," the operation aimed at keeping the rivers free from Viet Cong, and then with Naval Intelligence in Europe before leaving the Navy to attend rabbinical school.

=== Military chaplaincy ===
Following ordination from JTS in 1976, Resnicoff returned to the Navy as a chaplain, serving in many locations in the United States and overseas.

From 1992 to 1994, Resnicoff served as Command Chaplain for Recruit Training Command ("RTC"), Orlando, Florida, where he was part of the team headed by Captain Kathleen Bruyere that integrated men and women into basic training for the first time, and created a new chaplain message for the recruits: "Chapel helps you make it through Boot Camp; Faith helps you make it through life."

==== Vietnam Veterans Memorial ====
Resnicoff was part of a group of Vietnam veterans, led by Jan Scruggs, that worked to create the Vietnam Veterans Memorial, in Washington, D.C. Scruggs was an Army corporal with the 199th Light Infantry Brigade who had been wounded on the battlefield in Vietnam. On Nov 13, 1982, Resnicoff delivered the closing prayer at the official dedication of "The Wall."

==== Beirut Barracks bombing ====
On October 23, 1983, while a chaplain for the United States Sixth Fleet, Resnicoff was present in Beirut, Lebanon, during the suicide truck bomb attack that took the lives of 241 American military personnel, and wounded scores more. He had arrived on Friday, Oct 21, to lead a Memorial Service for Sgt Allen Soifert, a Jewish American Marine killed by sniper fire. Transportation had been offered to return him to the Sixth Fleet flagship in Gaeta, Italy, on Saturday, but Resnicoff said he could not travel on Shabbat, the Jewish Sabbath, and would remain in Beirut with the Marines until the following day, when the first truck bomb attack occurred at 6:20AM on Sunday, Oct 23, demolishing the Marine barracks.

Four days after the attack, the White House team that visited Beirut, led by Vice President of the United States, George H. W. Bush, asked for a report on the attack and its aftermath—and on April 13, 1984, President Ronald Reagan read that report as his keynote address to the Rev. Jerry Falwell's "Baptist Fundamentalism '84" convention, in Washington, DC. During the delivery of the speech, President Reagan was interrupted by a small group of protestors, holding pre-printed banners, chanting, "Bread, not bombs." Reagan later commented, "Wouldn't it be nice if a little bit of that Marine spirit would rub off, and they would listen [to the chaplain's words] about brotherly love?"

===== "Camouflage kippa" (skullcap) =====
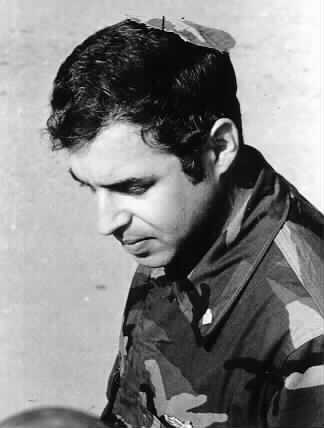
Resnicoff with "camouflage kippa" described in Presidential speech in online

During the rescue efforts following the bombing, a Catholic Chaplain named George Pucciarelli tore off a piece of his Marine camouflage uniform to make a skullcap ("kippah") for Resnicoff, after Resnicoff used his to wipe the blood from a wounded Marine's face. This widely reported story, recounted in President Reagan's 1984 speech, was entered into the Congressional Record. The story was credited with helping the passage of the religious apparel amendment allowing military personnel to wear head coverings for religious reasons (an amendment that had failed to pass in the House of Representatives for two years prior to the recounting of this story). This story was also quoted by some military leaders who had previously opposed the uniform policy change, but now supported it, including the Commandant and Sergeant Major of the Marine Corps. This amendment reportedly laid the groundwork for the directive (later, changed to a Department of Defense Instruction) that established wide-ranging changes to official military policies and procedures for the Accommodation of Religious Practices Within the Military Services.

==== Days of Remembrance of the Victims of Holocaust ====
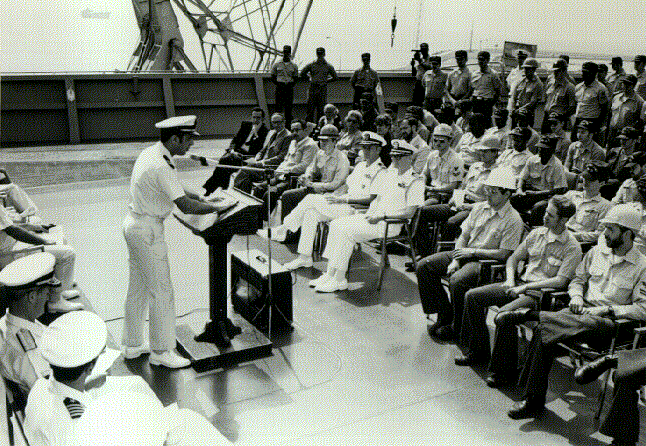
Leading first official U.S.Navy DRVH shipboard ceremony, USS Puget Sound, Malaga, Spain, 1984

In 1984, Resnicoff's efforts to convince the United States Department of Defense to participate in the national annual program for the Days of Remembrance of the Victims of the Holocaust (DRVH) were successful.

In 1984, the first official year of military involvement, Resnicoff coordinated a meeting between Rabbi Seymour Siegel, Executive Director of the United States Holocaust Memorial Council, and Vice Admiral Edward Martin, Commander, United States Sixth Fleet, and then conducted the first shipboard Holocaust Days of Remembrance Ceremony, on board USS Puget Sound, the Sixth Fleet Flagship.

==== Gay and lesbian rights ====
Resnicoff worked to support the rights of men and women of all sexual orientations, as well as those of all faiths. His work has been recognized by long-time advocates of LGBT rights, including his work at the Naval War College as far back as the early 1990s. He was later chosen by the White House to deliver the prayer at the Presidential signing ceremony for the repeal of the military's "Don't Ask, Don't Tell" policy.

==== United States European Command ====
From 1997 to 2000, Resnicoff was the first Jewish Chaplain to serve at the level of Command Chaplain for a Unified Combatant Command, serving as chaplain for the United States European Command (USEUCOM), under the leadership of General Wesley Clark. He served as a principal advisor to General Clark and the USEUCOM staff on matters of religion, ethics, and morals; coordinated religious support for more than 100,000 U.S. military personnel and families of all military branches and all faiths; and served as liaison to the chaplaincies of other nations throughout the USEUCOM area of responsibility (AOR), leading and coordinating three International Military Chiefs of Chaplains Conferences in Europe, where he introduced a new vision of the potential role of chaplains as liaisons to religious leaders, and of religion as a force for peace and conflict resolution, and for reconciliation after the battles.

During the time of American involvement in Bosnia and Kosovo, he worked with U.S. and NATO troops, civilian relief workers, political and military leaders, religious representatives, and refugees, and represented the military in the first conference of religious seminary students from Kosovo, Bosnia, Albania, and Macedonia; and led a delegation representing the four official religions of Bosnia—Catholic, Eastern Orthodox, Muslim, and Jewish—on an historic visit to the U.S.

==== Sixth Fleet and Israel ====
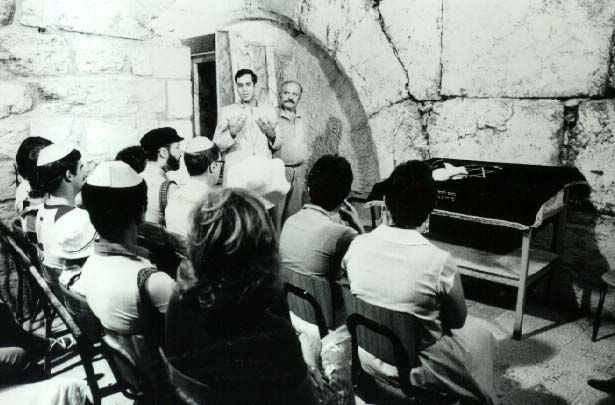
Leading 1983 religious service in Wilson's Arch at Jerusalem's Western Wall

In 1983, Resnicoff held the first interfaith service (and first service jointly attended by men and women) held at the Western Wall since it came under Israel's control, conducted under the supervision of the Israel Ministry of Religious Affairs, as part of a special welcome for the U.S. Sixth Fleet. He also led Israel's first official Martin Luther King Jr. Day ceremony, held in the President's residence.

He helped establish the Haifa, Israel, USO and a center for Sixth Fleet personnel on leave in Jerusalem; led the first official visit to Israel by the United States Army, Navy, and Air Force Chiefs of Chaplains, as well as the first visit by officers and crew of the aircraft carrier, USS John F. Kennedy (CV-67), to Israel's John F. Kennedy Memorial and Peace Forest.

==== 1986 US-USSR Reagan-Gorbachev meetings in Iceland ====
In 1986, Resnicoff was sent to Iceland to lead Yom Kippur (Day of Atonement) services during the historic Reagan-Gorbachev pre-summit meetings. The symbolism of Resnicoff's participation in this initiative made an impression on many Americans. Senator Claiborne Pell (D-RI) entered the text of the October 8, 1986, Providence Journal article, "Navy Rabbi To Join Iceland Team: Russian immigrant's grandson picked to lead staff services," in the October 9, 1986, Senate Congressional Record.

=== Special presentations, conferences, and prayers ===
Rabbi Resnicoff has lectured on pluralism, religious freedom, and ethics and values, at many civilian and military forums, including the Northeastern Political Science Association; the International Society for Military Ethics (ISME); the Defense Equal Opportunity Management Institute; the Pearson Peacekeeping Centre in Clementsport, Nova Scotia and the Begin-Sadat Center for Strategic Studies, in Israel's Bar Ilan University.

He was the first chaplain to brief the Joint Chiefs of Staff and worldwide Unified Combatant Command commanders, at a Washington, DC, CINC's Conference, where he addressed issues of core values and quality of life. In 1996, he crafted and led the first Conference on Ethics and Leadership for the staff of the Camp David Presidential Retreat. He was the only military chaplain to attend the United Nations Millennium World Peace Summit of Religious and Spiritual leaders, was one of 100 religious leaders at the Sep 11, 1988, White House discussion with then President Bill Clinton on the way religion might combat violence in American schools, and represented the U.S. military at the 1999 Seventh World Assembly of the World Conference of Religions for Peace, in Amman, Jordan.

Resnicoff's February 2006 presentation on religion, the military, and church-and-state issues, presented at the Columbia University School of International and Public Affairs (SIPA) was broadcast multiple times on C-SPAN. He presented an updated version of this talk—"Faith and Foxholes: Religion in the Military"—in May 2010 at the Library of Congress (LOC). In the same month, the LOC Veterans History Project conducted a two-hour video oral history of Resnicoff for their permanent historical archives.

Resnicoff, who has offered prayers at many public ceremonies, is "known for his work to sanctify moments of American trauma" through prayer, including his 2021 prayer on the floor of the House of Representatives that combined memories of 9/11 and the message of the Jewish High Holy Days. He has been referred to as "The Wall's rabbi" because of his many prayers for ceremonies at the Vietnam Veterans Memorial.

Two of Resnicoff's prayers, delivered in 1987 at the first Days of Remembrance of the Victims of the Holocaust ceremony in the U.S. Capitol and the 1982 dedication of the Vietnam Veterans Memorial are included in the book, The Treasury of American Prayer. He has offered more Congressional prayers on the floor of the House and Senate than any other rabbi. His prayer for the House pro-forma session on December 30, 2019, the final House prayer for the decade, was featured that day on the CNN news show Inside Politics, with host Nia-Malika Henderson introducing it with the words that "as 2019 winds down, a prayer this morning from Capitol Hill from a rabbi, marking the end of the year with a message of hope." video

On June 24, 2023, Resnicoff delivered the prayers for the commissioning of the guided-missile destroyer USS CARL M. LEVIN (DDG-120), the first US Navy ship named for a Jewish member of congress.

In January 2024, Resnicoff delivered an online talk on the history of Jewish chaplains in the United States military, sponsored by the Haberman Institute for Jewish studies, which was also posted on youtube.

== Views ==
=== Spiritual force protection ===
Resnicoff is frequently quoted on the impact of war and violence on the human spirit, including the distinction he makes between "outrage", a feeling we must value, because it is part of being human (and we must fight against the danger that war and violence can numb us against it), and "rage", where emotions take over, we lose our moral compass, and we become vulnerable to manipulation by others who want us to lose our way. While working for General Wesley K. Clark at the U.S. European Command, Resnicoff worked to expand the concept of force protection to include Spiritual Force Protection: protecting military personnel not only against physical danger, but against threats to their humanity, as well. The book, Stoic Warriors: The Ancient Philosophy Behind the Military Mind quotes his position that "We don't want our people just to come home physically; we want them to come back as close to the human beings they were before they went in."

=== Expanded role of military chaplains in peace and reconciliation initiatives ===
Resnicoff believes chaplains have a role to play in the area of engagement: building ties and strengthening relationships with civilian religious leaders. He believes that "NATO chaplains should have a greater role in supporting Allied troops with personal moral conflicts, and in reducing misunderstandings about foreign religious beliefs ... it is important to move fast and establish regional cooperative programs in such potential hot spots as Eastern Europe and South Africa "so that we are ahead of the power curve before another Kosovo explodes.""

== Personal life ==
The artist Joel Resnicoff was Arnold's younger brother. Descended from a long line of rabbis, his grandfather was Rabbi Mnachem Risikoff and great-grandfather was Rabbi Zvi Yosef Resnick.

== Awards and honors ==
Resnicoff has received numerous military awards, including the Defense Superior Service Medal, the Legion of Merit, four Meritorious Service Medals, the Joint Service Commendation Medal, and two Navy and Marine Corps Commendation Medals (one with the Combat V, for Valor). For his service with the Air Force following retirement from the military, he was awarded the United States Air Force Decoration for Exceptional Civilian Service, the highest award that the Air Force can present to a civilian. Other special awards include The President's Honor Graduate Award, Naval War College; International Community Service Award, Moment Magazine; The Rabbi Louis Paris Hall of Heroes Gold Medallion, Chapel of Four Chaplains; and the Commandant's Award, Defense Equal Opportunity Management Institute (DEOMI), Patrick Air Force Base, Florida. In May 2013 Resnicoff was awarded the annual Daniel Webster Award for Distinguished Public Service, by the Dartmouth Club of Washington, D.C.

In 1994, the Chaplain Arnold E. Resnicoff Scholarship Fund was established in his honor at The Jewish Theological Seminary to help rabbinical students who agree to serve at least one assignment as military chaplains, following ordination.

On May 19, 2023, Resnicoff became the first rabbi to be designated a Guest of Honor for the USMC Marine Barracks, Washington, D.C. Friday Evening Parade. He was one of four individual chaplains singled out for this honor, and the parade as a whole was dedicated to all Navy chaplains. That morning, in a Chaplain Corps event held at the Washington Navy Yard, Resnicoff and the other Guests of Honor were recognized as "trailblazers" in the history of the chaplaincy, sharing lessons from their careers with Chaplain Corps leaders.

On May 29, 2026, he was awarded the Vietnam Veterans Memorial SERVICE BEYOND SERVICE AWARD award at a ceremony at the Vietnam Veterans Memorial, recognizing veterans who followed up service in Vietnam with service to the nation or communities back in the US.

== Articles and books ==
- Foreword, Bryen, Stephen D., "Security for Holy Places: How to Build a Security Plan for Your Church, Synagogue, Mosque, or Temple" (Morgan James Publishing, 2020)
- "Seeking God's Presence: Report from the Beirut Bombing," Military Chaplain's Review, 1984
- "With the Marines in Beirut: A Holy Day Journal," Jewish Spectator, Fall 1984
- "Retaliation: Self-Defense, Justice, or Revenge?": Moral and Legal Perspectives on an Anti-Terrorist Strategy," a paper written for the Naval War College, 1985
- "May It Be a Blessing: An Introduction to Judaism," Navy Chaplain's Bulletin, Summer 1986
- "Since War Begins in the Minds of Man: Combat Ministry Away From the Battle," The Navy Chaplain, Fall 1986
- "Prayers That Hurt: Public Prayer in Interfaith Settings," Military Chaplain's Review, 1987; expanded and reprinted in Curtana: A Journal for the Study of the Military Chaplaincy, inaugural edition (Vol 1, No. 1), Fall 2009.
- "Jewish Views of War and Peace," Proceedings of the Rabbinical Assembly, March 1989
- "From Vision to Action," The Navy Chaplain, Volume 8, Number 2, 1996
- "Rules for Our Sake; Not for our Enemies," Living Words IV: A Spiritual Source Book for an Age of Terror, published by Sh'ma, JFL Books, 2002.
- Horror and Hope: Americans Remember the Holocaust, United States Navy Chaplain Resource Board (Chaplain Arnold E. Resnicoff, Project Officer), March 1987.
- Days of Remembrance: A Department of Defense Guide for Annual Commemorative Observances, First Edition (96 pages), Office of the Secretary of Defense, March 1988 (Editorial Board, and U.S. Navy representative to the DOD Days of Remembrance Committee).
- Days of Remembrance: A Department of Defense Guide for Annual Commemorative Observances, Second Edition (revised and expanded, 145 pages), Office of the Secretary of Defense, March 1989 (Editorial Board, and U.S. Navy representative to the DOD Days of Remembrance Committee).
