= Resnick =

Resnick is a Yiddish surname, a variant of Reznik, Risikoff. People with the surname include:

- Adam Resnick, American comedy writer
- Alice Robie Resnick (born 1939), Ohio Supreme Court Justice
- Artie Resnick (born 1937), American songwriter and record producer
- David Resnick (1924–2012), Israeli architect
- Faye Resnick (born 1957), American television personality and interior designer
- Joseph Y. Resnick (1924–1969), member of the US House of Representatives from New York
- Josh Resnick, American video game producer
- Ken Resnick, American wrestling announcer
- Laura Resnick (born 1962), science fiction and fantasy author
- Lauren Resnick, American educational psychologist
- Lynda Resnick (born 1944), American entrepreneur and businesswoman
- Mike Resnick (1942–2020), American science fiction author
- Milton Resnick (1917–2004), American abstract expressionist painter
- Mitchel Resnick (born 1956), American computer scientist and academic
- Rafael Resnick Brenner, Argentine lawyer and businessman
- Randy Resnick (born 1947), American guitarist
- Robert Resnick (1923–2014), American physicist and textbook author
- Robert J. Resnick (1940–2022), American psychotherapist and psychologist
- Stephen Resnick (born 1938), American Marxian economist
- Solomon Chaim Resnick Chaim Solomon Resnick (1862-1940) Russian rabbi
- Stewart Resnick (born 1938), American businessman
- Zvi Yosef Resnick (1841–1912), Russian rabbi, scholar, and rosh yeshivah
- Mnachem Risikoff (born Mnachem Resnick), Russian and American rabbi and scholar

Fictional characters:

- Charlie Resnick, a detective inspector created by John Harvey
  - Resnick (TV series), based on the character created by John Harvey

== See also ==
- Resnik (surname)
- Reznick
- Risikoff
