= Joel Resnicoff =

American fashion illustrator

Joel Hirsch Resnicoff
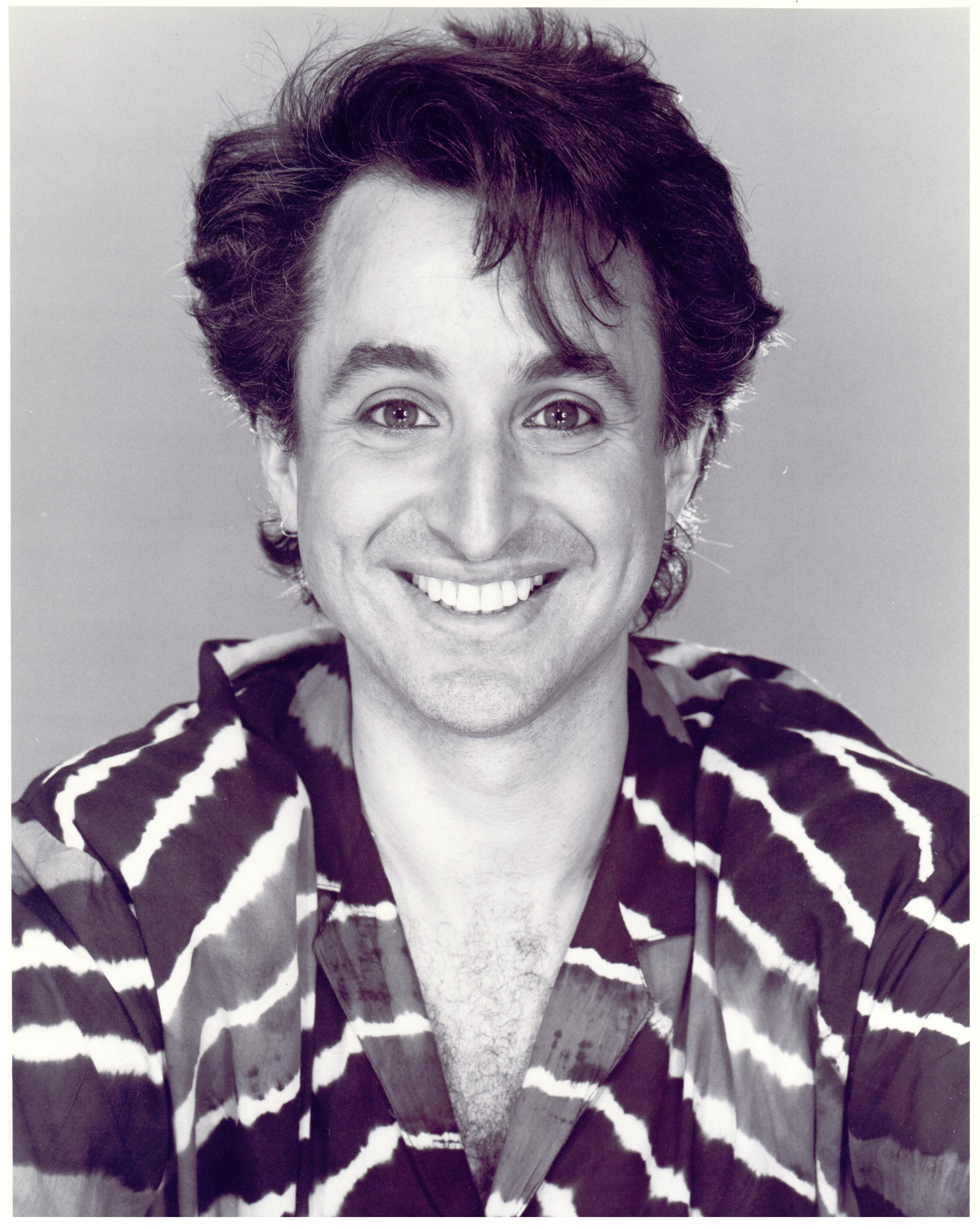
- Resnicoff in 1980
- Born: October 23, 1948; Washington, D.C., U.S.
- Died: December 28, 1986 (aged 38); Takoma Park, Maryland, U.S.
- Burial place: Mount Ararat Cemetery, East Farmingdale, New York
- Education: University of Miami; Parsons School of Design
- Occupations: Fashion illustrator, artist
- Known for: Fashion illustration for Women's Wear Daily
- Relatives: Arnold Resnicoff (brother)

Joel Hirsch Resnicoff (October 23, 1948 – December 28, 1986) was an American artist and fashion illustrator who incorporated expressionistic art into commercial fashion illustration. He worked for seven years on the staff of Women's Wear Daily before becoming a freelance artist, creating fashion illustrations, department-store window displays, greeting cards, and clothing designs for the brand Esprit. His work was noted for blending diverse cultural influences and, alongside artists such as Andy Warhol, for blurring the line between commercial and fine art. Resnicoff died of AIDS-related complications at age 38.

== Early life and education ==
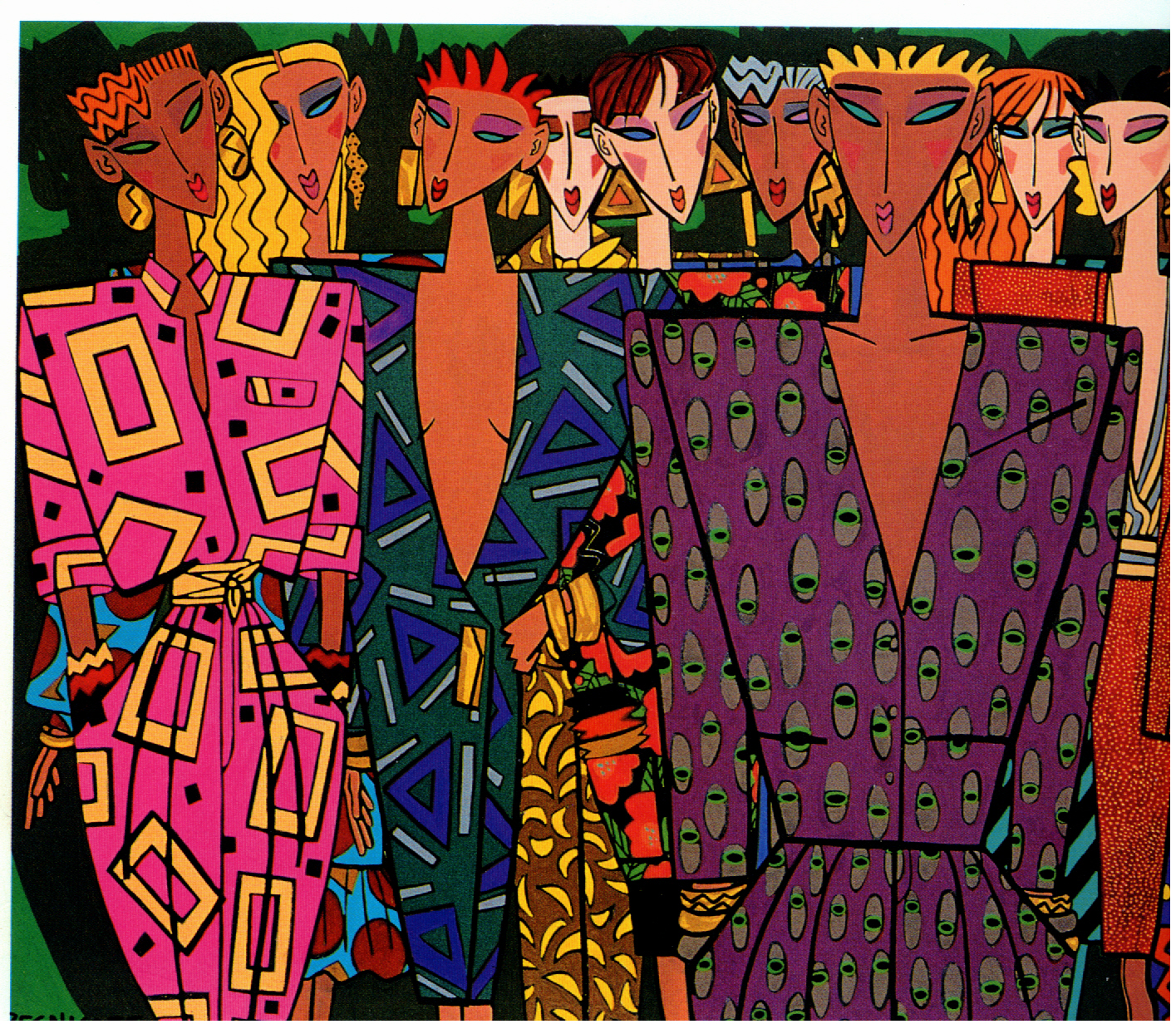

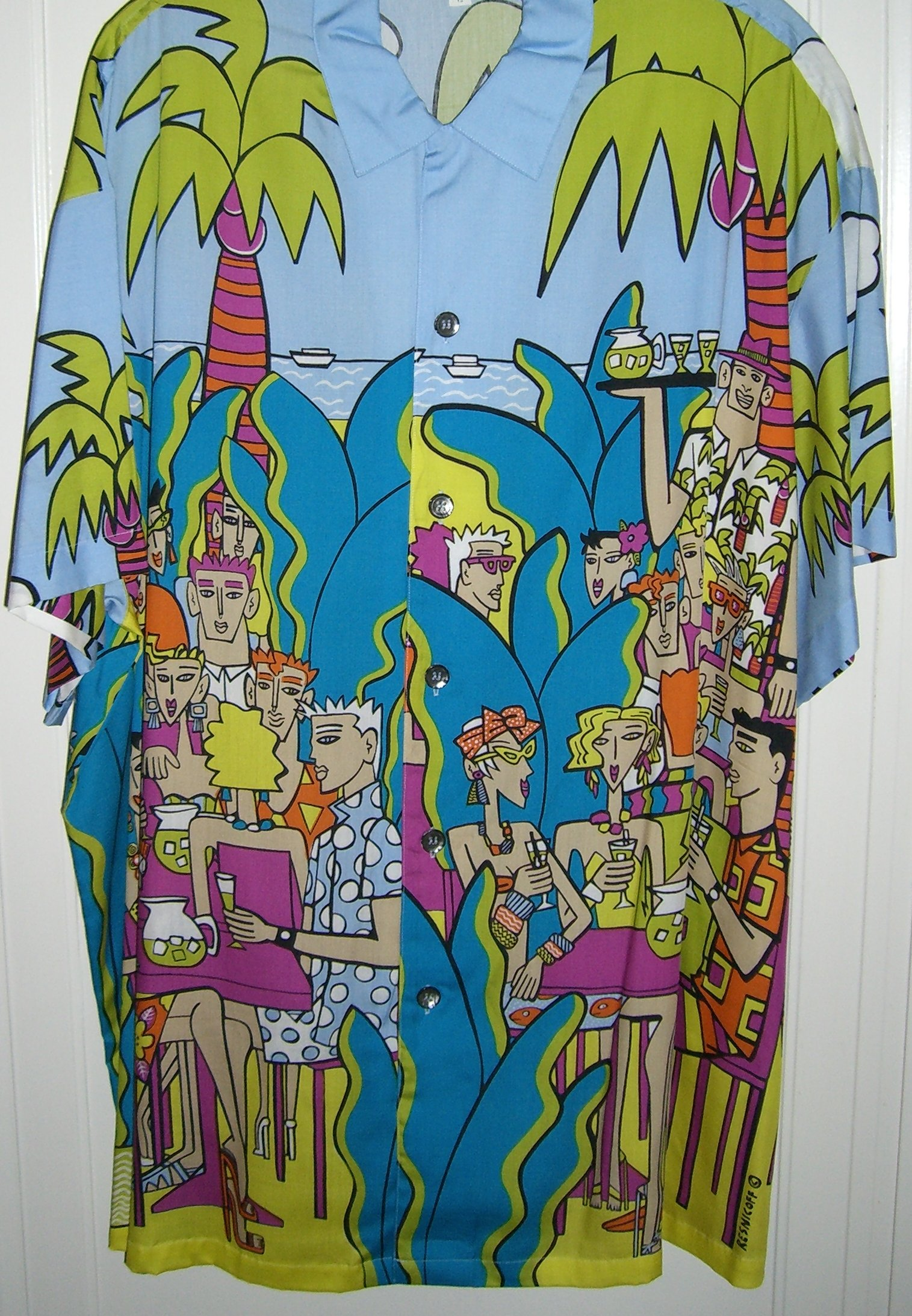
Resnicoff shirt for Espirit

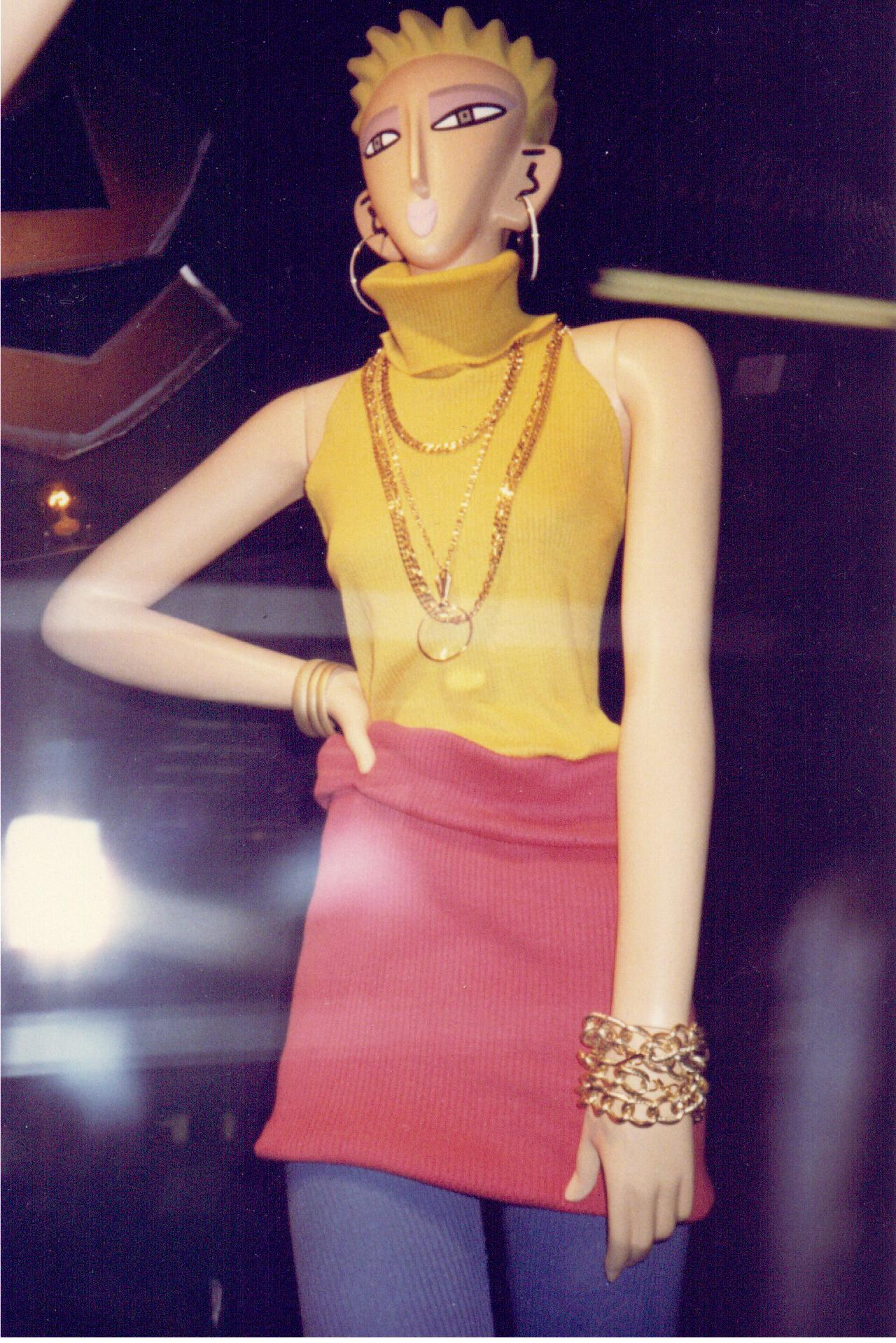
Resnicoff mannequin

Resnicoff was born in Washington, D.C., and raised in Hyattsville, Maryland. He studied art at the University of Miami for one year, and then transferred to Parsons School of Design in Greenwich Village, New York City.

== Career ==
After two years at Parsons School of Design, Resnicoff worked as a fashion illustrator for seven years on the staff of Women's Wear Daily (WWD), the trade journal often referred to as "the Bible of fashion" , where illustrations were used more as commentaries on fashion and predictions of consumer reaction than as a means to advertise and sell products to consumers.

WWD proved to be a "wonderful showcase" for artists including Resnicoff, and through his work, he quickly made a name for himself in the fashion industry. However, after seven years with that publication, he left in order to devote a year to experimentation with different art forms, take some classes in sculpture, and have a chance, as he put it, "to deal with reality after a life of illusion." During this year, he supported himself through street portraits, along with many fellow street artists whose work would collectively be remembered as part of the artistic hey-day of the East Village. Soon, his career as a freelance artist took off, eventually including works in water colors, charcoals, oils, and paintings; a series of fashion mannequins that were based on the style he had popularized in his illustrations; some overseas travel for invitational commissioned artwork, including billboard designs in Scandinavia; and art he created for clothing and fashion accessories that included the international design brand, Esprit.

In the early 1980s, his unusual displays for windows in major New York City department stores, including Macy's and Bloomingdale's, caught the attention of both the public and the press, with an article in the New York Post, which reported in 1983 that his Macy's window display literally "stopped traffic" on 34th St. The windows were part of Macy's campaign to publicize Resnicoff's new shop in its New York location. His work was not limited to any one store or chain of stores, and although his link to Macy's would continue for a number of years, his artwork was also used by Bloomingdale's in a number of ways, including a series of brightly colored beach towels, marketed as "Camp Bloomie's".

In addition to artwork that appeared on apparel and accessories, he created and illustrated a series of postcards and greeting cards, called ResniCards, that gently poked fun at New York City, its residents, and its tourists. In these cards, he contrasted often overweight women with the ultra-slim figures in the fashion world that he regularly used in his own illustrations. As one reviewer put it, his cards featured "pachiderm-sized dames in tacky-wacky get-ups...shattering la mode". He could poke fun at New York and New Yorkers because his love for both the city and its city-dwellers was well known. When asked to describe New York in three words, he wrote, energy, variety, and creativity.

Resnicoff's fashion illustrations were well known and wide-ranging, including his years of work with WWD, and with other Fairchild Publications journals, including Footwear News, and the Daily News Record; a variety of fashion advertisements in virtually every New York newspaper, from The New York Times to The Village Voice, including cover illustrations for some, such as the Soho News, and Art Direction; contributions to special publications such as the Manhattan Catalog; illustrations and lay-outs for national and international periodicals, including Travel and Leisure and Mademoiselle; special brochures for stores and periodicals, including New York magazine; and multi-color spreads for a number of foreign publications and journals, including some in Italy, like Vanity Magazine, and Japan.

He was also featured as an illustrator in major campaigns for national and international chains and brands, such as Macy's, Charles Jourdan, Intercoiffure, and Fong Leng International; independent stores and smaller "boutique" chains, such as Mr. Jay, Armadillo, and the designer boutique Riding High; and designers, including Regina Kravitz, Calvin Klein and Yves St. Laurent. His work gained special popularity in Japan as examples of American avant-garde art, described by Japanese artist Pater Sato as work that "sends us messages of joy, peace, and humor. His comic style draws us to a new world." Resnicoff himself wrote that he "would like people to look at the world a little differently after looking at my drawings." "The whole idea of art is to inspire, to teach, to bring something to another level.... Commercial art is the art of the century, it's the most visible, it goes to the greatest number of people." Resnicoff's work always reflected his own unique style, but they also often brought to mind images from "fine art" or literature, such as in his well-known illustration for hosiery that "directly referenced the film poster, Six Girls Seeking Shelter, by Vladimir and Georgi Stenberg." In some ways, along with artists like Andy Warhol and Antonio Lopez, Resnicoff's art helped "blur the line between commercial art and fine art." Samples of Resnicoff's work that appeared in the magazine, Hit Parade, are on file as part of the New York Public Library Collection.

In 1985, Resnicoff began working with Esprit, and in 1986, two summer seasons of clothing, including brightly colored shirts and scarves, featured his designs—with his signature on each item. Using an unusual approach, the company commissioned Resnicoff to paint a series of "oversize summery murals", which Esprit then used as a basis for its "sassy...bold, and colorful" fabric designs. In fact, Resnicoff's artwork for the summer designs were so successful that he was invited to repeat his collaboration with Esprit for an additional season, but by then he had to decline the invitation due to his failing health. In addition to his work with Espirit, Resnicoff also designed a series of Tee-Hee Shirts—pullovers and sweatshirts, and "cooking apparel"—aprons, gloves, and pot-holders, illustrated with whimsical characters similar to those on his Resnicards illustrations.

=== Reputation ===
His work did not fit easily into any one category, and "the figures in his amusing illustrations defy stereotype and are posed in unexpected ways." Those figures reflected a mixture of cultures, with viewers seeing something familiar to their own background, mixed with something more distant: a combination of the "girl next door," and "the girl on the other side of the world." So, for example, a Japanese work describes "the influence of black African sculptures," mixed with a more Japanese look characterized by "lips like cherry blossom petals, and almond-shaped eyes." His work captured the new impact of multiculturalism on art and the "standards of beauty" of the seventies, and along with artists such as Andy Warhol helped "blur the line between commercial art and fine art."

However his work was described, a strong sense of humor was always evident, which others referred to "his comic style," and he himself described his work as "joy, love, and humor." In 1984, he was diagnosed as HIV-positive, during the early years of the AIDS epidemic in the United States, which also took the lives of many of his friends and fellow artists. He died at the age of 38 on December 28, 1986, as a result of AIDS-related complications. In his final months, he returned to live with his mother near Hyattsville, Maryland, and he died at Washington Adventist Hospital in Takoma Park, Maryland.

At that time, he was already one of only a handful of illustrators and artists to be included in a collection that included such well-known names as Andy Warhol, but he was recognized as early as 1972, shortly after his start at Women's Wear Daily, as an "upcoming illustrator," who "manages to avoid the look alike syndrome of fashion illustration with models that are always more than elongated clothes hangers.... He has created his own coterie of Gibson Girls, who manage to combine both innocence and the decadent languor of fin de siecle illustration."

Five years before his death, in an article that appeared in the inaugural edition of the magazine, Hit Parade, the artist and writer, Francis Toohey, predicted that, "in years to come, Resnicoff's art might be likened to the advertising triumphs of Mucha and Toulouse-Lautrec or to the graphic abandon of advertising during its artsy heyday of the 30s."

In his 2019 book One Day: the Extraordinary Story of an Ordinary 24 Hours in America, Pulitzer Prize-winning author Gene Weingarten wrote, "Resnicoff worked within the genre pioneered by Andy Warhol—the collision of fine art and commercial art, which both artists considered a distinction without a difference. Resnicoff's work had balloony, cartoony echoes of Roy Lichtenstein and perspective-bending elements of Picasso, and certainly the impromptu feel of Keith Haring.... The truth is, the far more famous Haring was not nearly as inventive or versatile as Resnicoff."

== Personal life ==
Resnicoff had his Bar Mitzvah in 1961. His funeral, in December 1986, was conducted as a Jewish service by Rabbi Joseph Brodie, and he was buried at Mount Ararat Cemetery in East Farmingdale, New York, in his family's plot. Resnicoff's older brother is Arnold Resnicoff, a Rabbi and former U.S. Navy Chaplain.
