= Vera Reznik =

Russian writer and translator

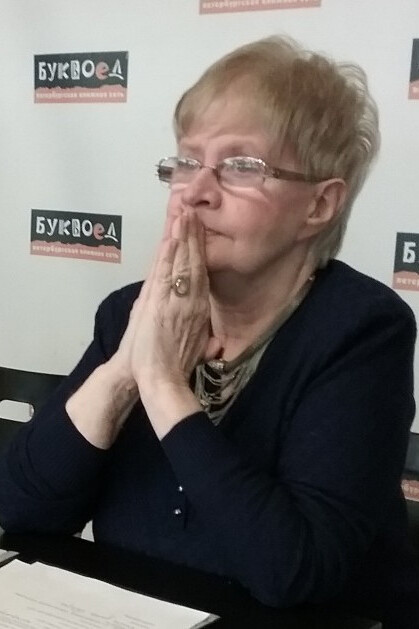
- Born: 21 November 1944 (age 81); Leningrad, Soviet Union
- Education: Leningrad State University
- Occupations: Writer, translator
- Writing career
- Period: 1980s–present

Vera Grigorievna Reznik (Russian: Вера Григорьевна Резник, born November 21, 1944, Leningrad) is a Russian writer, translator, and literary scholar.

== Early life and education ==
Vera Reznik was born in Leningrad (St. Petersburg) in 1944. She graduated from the philological faculty of the Leningrad State University as a philologist-romanist.

== Career ==
Since 1986, she has been engaged in translations of Spanish and Latin American literatures. She has translated the works of José Ortega y Gasset, Jorge Luis Borges, Miguel de Unamuno, Eduardo Mallea, Juan Carlos Onetti, Octavio Paz, Umberto Eco (from Italian), Leopoldo Lugones, César Vallejo etc. She has published four books of her own writings. She is a member of the St. Petersburg Writers' Union, and of the Guild "Masters of Russian Literary Translation". She worked as a lecturer at the Hermitage Museum and Saint-Petersburg State University of Culture and Arts, and continues to lecture within the project "Nefictivnoye obrazovanie" (Non-fictitious education). She has written a series of articles on Spanish, Latin American and Russian culture.

Her prose is of interest to Russian literary critics. In the appendix to the book "Personages from a family photo album" Russian philologist, translator and sociologist Boris Dubin notes that her prose is characterized, “in addition to unforced clarity and mastery, by an elegance of exposition that is achieved not only due the deep philological and philosophical intuition, but, undoubtedly, thanks to the obvious literary gift of its author".

== Awards and honours ==
Vera Reznik's books "Malaya proza" ("Minor prose", 2012) and "Personazhi alboma" ("Personages from a family photo album", 2017) were in the short list of the Andrei Bely Prize. Her book "Twelve tales about a certain Mr. Petrov" ("Petrovskaya dyuzhina", 2021) was nominated for the "Yasnaya Polyana" award.

== Selected works ==
=== Translations ===
- Ramón del Valle-Inclán: “The Paper Rose”, “Madrid Landscape” //Ramón del Valle-Inclán, Plays selected in two volumes — Leningrad, Khudlit, 1986.
- Eduardo Mallea. “The Resentment” (translation of the novel, preface) — Leningrad: Khudlit, 1988 — ISBN 5-280-00360-3
- Diego de Ágreda y Vargas. “The indiscreet brother” // Spanish novel of the Golden Age — Leningrad, Khudlit, 1989 — ISBN 5-280-00677-7
- Leopoldo Lugones: “An inexplicable phenomenon", "Viola acherontia" //Book of grains of sand, The fantastic prose of Latin America — Leningrad: Khudlit, 1990 — ISBN 5-280-00971-7
- Jorge Luis Borges: “History of Eternity” (collab. with A.G. Pogoniailo), “From Somebody to Nobody", " Shapes of a Legend ", " History of the Echoes of a Name ", " A Theologian in Death " and others //Jorge Luis Borges. Collection — Leningrad: Khudlit, 1990 — ISBN 5-8352-0020-X
- José Ortega y Gasset: “Time, distance and form in Proust's art"// José Ortega y Gasset. Aesthetics. Philosophy of Culture. Moscow: Iskusstvo, 1991 — ISBN 978-5-210-02441-1
- Octavio Paz: “Poetry and poem”, “Mystery unveiled”// Octavio Paz. Poetry. Criticism. Erotic — Moscow: Russian Phenomenological Society. 1996 —
- Jorge Luis Borges: “A Theologian in Death", "The Chamber of Statues”; “History of the two who dreamed”, “The Postponed Sorcerer", "The Mirror of ink”// Jorge Luis Borges. Library of Babel and other essays — St. Petersburg: Azbuka, 1997 — ISBN 5-7684-0387-6
- Umberto Eco. The Absent Structure: Introduction to Semiotics (in colab. with A.G. Pogoniailo) — St. Petersburg: Petropolis, 1998 — ISBN 5-86708-114-1(Reprints: 2004, 2006, 2019)
- Octavio Paz. The consecration of the instant. Poetry. Philosophical essays — S.-Petersburg. Symposium, 2000 — ISBN 5-89091-122-8
- Leopoldo Lugones. The secret of Don Juan //The myth of Don Juan — St.-Petersburg: Terra Fantastica. Corvus, 2000 — ISBN 5-7921-0325-9
- Octavio Paz, or The effort to be (introductory article) // Octavio Paz. Selected works. — Moscow: Terra — Knizhny club, 2001. — ISBN 5-275-00290-4
- Miguel de Unamuno. On erudition and criticism // Miguel de Unamuno. The life of Don Quixote and Sancho... — St. Petersburg: Nauka, 2002 — ISBN 5-02-028458-0
- Magician’s stories (J.L. Borges, O. Paz, E. Diego and others) — St. Petersburg: Azbuka Klassika, 2002. — ISBN 5-352-00151-2
- Magician’s poetry (J.L. Borges and O. Paz) — St. Petersburg: Azbuka Klassika, 2003. — ISBN 5-352-00423-6
- Juan Carlos Onetti: “No Man's Land”, “The Farewells"// The Novels of the Magicians — St. Petersburg: Azbuka Klassika, 2004. — ISBN 5-352-00722-7
- Jaime Contreras: Sotos contra Riquelmes. Regidores, Inquisitors, and Crypto-Jews (in collab. with G.G. Oryol) — St. Petersburg: IPC Vesti, 2006. — ISBN 5-86153-149-8
- Leopoldo Lugones: The rain of fire — St. Petersburg: Azbuka, 2010. — ISBN 978-5-389-01089-5

=== Artistic prose ===
- Aria from cantata 114 (short story)// "Khreshchatyk" magazine (Munich), #30, 2005–2006
- Men, dogs and environment (short story)// "Khreshchatyk", #33, 2006
- From Petrov's life: “Pattern”, “Lake” (short story)// "Khreshchatyk", #38, 2007
- An empowering joy (short story)// "Khreshchatyk", #35, 2007
- The minor prose — St. Petersburg: Helicon Plus, 2012
- Daguerreotypes and photos — St. Petersburg: Aletheia, 2014 — ISBN 978-5-91419-868-5
- Personages from a family photo album — Kyiv: Laurus, 2017 — ISBN 978-966-2449-97-6
- About Petrov (short stories)// “Zvezda” Magazine (St. Petersburg). 2020, #3, #12
- Bath (short stories)// “Zvezda” Magazine (St. Petersburg), 2021, #6
- Twelve tales about a certain Mr. Petrov — St. Petersburg, RHGA Publishing House, 2021 — ISBN 978-5-907309-58-6

=== Literary and cultural studies ===
- Spanish aesthetics of the 17th century. Spanish aesthetics of the first half of the 18th century // Lectures on aesthetic history. Under the direction of M.S. Kagán. Vol. 1, vol. 2 — St. Petersburg (Leningrad): SpGU publishing house, 1973
- Latin American culture (a chapter in the book, in collab. with A.G. Pogonyaylo) // Artistic culture in the capitalist society: a typological structural research — St. Petersburg (Leningrad): SpGU Publishing House, 1986
- El Greco's painting "The Apostles St. Peter and St. Paul" in the context of Spanish culture in the 16th and early 17th centuries (a chapter in the book, in collab. with A.G. Pogonyaylo) // Cervantine Readings. — St. Petersburg (Leningrad): Nauka, 1988. — ISBN 5-02-027943-9
- Aesthetic thought in Latin America // Aesthetics. Vocabulary. — Moscow: Politizdat, 1989. — ISBN 5-250-00659-0
- The history of aesthetic thought in Latin America // History of aesthetic thought. In 6 volumes. Vol. 5. — Moscow: Iskusstvo, 1990. — ISBN 5-210-00162-8
- Comments to the text. Lectures on foreign literature — St. Petersburg, Petropolis, 2006 — ISBN 978-5-9676-0021-0(Reprints: St. Petersburg, Helicon Plus, 2012; St. Petersburg, Aletheia, 2017, St. Petersburg, RHGA, 2021)
