= Řezník =

Řezník (feminine: Řezníková) is a Czech word for 'butcher' and a surname. It may refer to:

- Řezník (rapper) (born 1986), Czech rapper
- Radim Řezník (born 1989), Czech football player

== See also ==
- Reznik
- Řezníček
