= Reznick =

Reznick is a Jewish surname, a variant of Reznik. Notable people with the surname include:

- Bruce Reznick (born 1953), American mathematician
- A spelling variant for David Resnick (1924–2012), Brazilian-born Israeli architect and town planner
- Howard Reznick, birth name of Hanon Reznikov (1950–2008), American actor and writer
- Dr. Morgan Reznick, a character on The Good Doctor (TV series)
- Allen Reznick (born 1952), American realtor
