= Donja Dubrava =

Donja Dubrava can refer to:

- Donja Dubrava, Zagreb, a city district of Zagreb, Croatia
- Donja Dubrava, Međimurje County, a village in northern Croatia
