= Croatian Fraternal Union Avenue =

Coordinates: 45°47′50″N 15°58′45″E

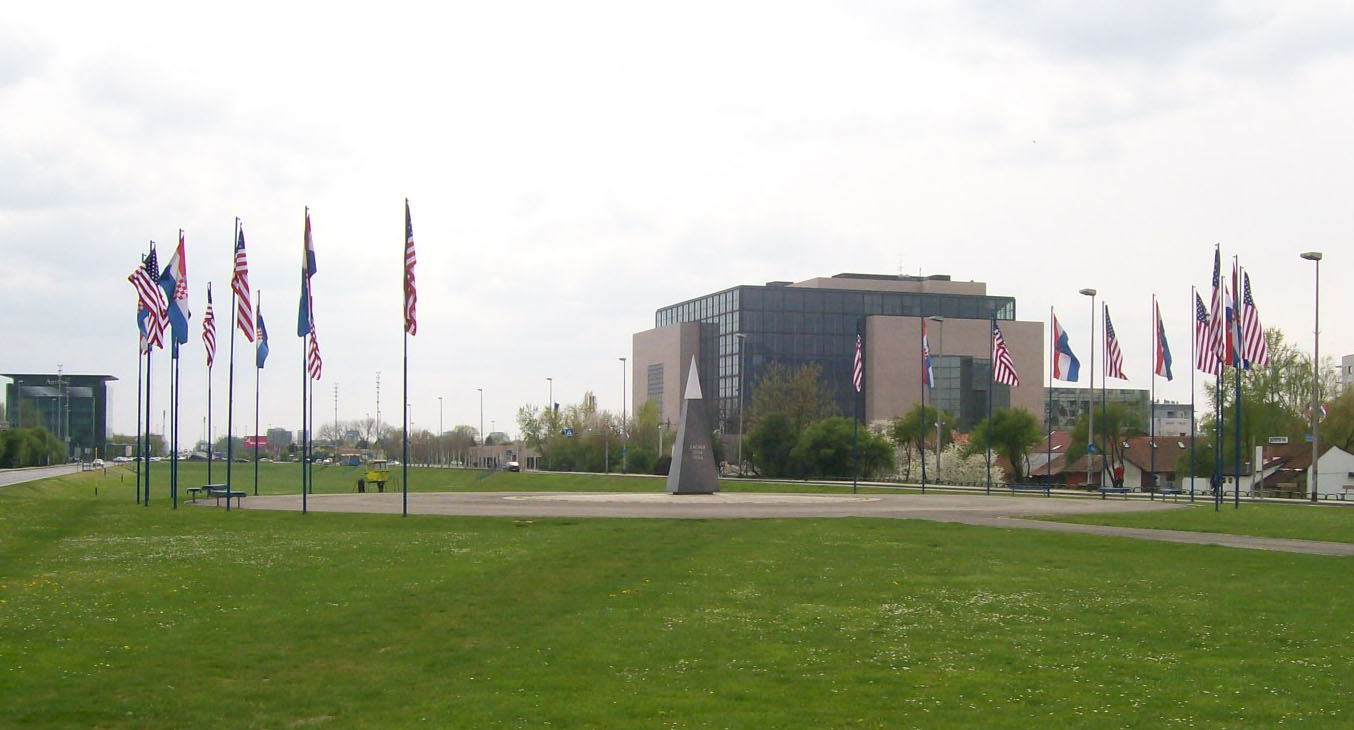
Croatian Fraternal Union Avenue (view on the National and University Library)

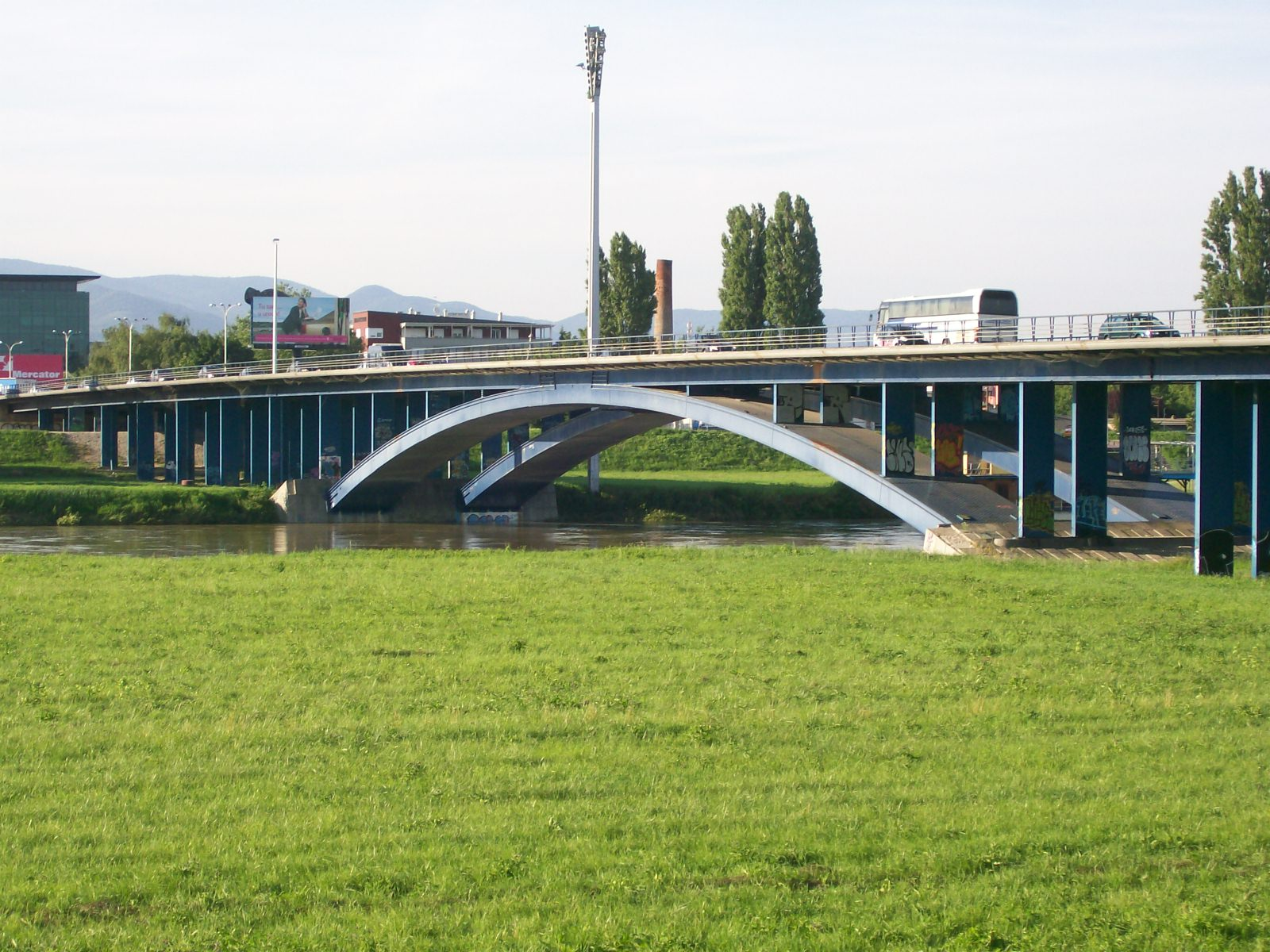
Freedom Bridge (Most slobode)

Croatian Fraternal Union Avenue (Croatian: Avenija Hrvatske bratske zajednice, often shortened to Avenija HBZ) is a controlled-access avenue in Zagreb, Croatia. Going north-south, the avenue connects the Martinovka neighborhood near downtown and Vatroslav Lisinski Concert Hall in the north with Novi Zagreb and the Liberty Bridge in the south.

The road runs from Paromlinska Street to Tomljanovićeva Road, intersecting Vukovar Avenue, Slavonska Avenue (interchange) and ending in the south with an interchange on Tomljanovićeva Road. Although it carries a lot of traffic, its drivers have to stop at traffic lights built on each intersection and interchange, prompting its status as one of the deadliest roads in Zagreb.

The avenue carries six lanes of traffic throughout its length except for the Freedom Bridge. An expansion of the bridge is planned for 2009.
