= Resnik, Zagreb =

Neighbourhood of Zagreb, Croatia

Resnik
- Interactive map of Resnik
- Coordinates: 45.8°N 16.08°E

Resnik is a neighbourhood in the southeast of Zagreb, Croatia, within the Peščenica - Žitnjak district. The area of the local city council of Resnik has a population of 1,414 (census 2021).

The core of the area was once an old village, first recorded in 1217. After World War II, it was part of a local administration unit called Resnički gaj (lit. 'Resnik grove'), together with Donja Dubrava. After 1952, it was part of the city municipality of Dubrava. The newly built Zagreb section of the Brotherhood and Unity Highway separated Resnik from the forested Resnički gaj to the north. In 1974, it became part of the city municipality of Peščenica.

The western part of the area is an industrial zone.
