= Zvi Yosef Resnick =

Russian rabbi and Rosh yeshivah (Dean of a Talmudic Academy)

Rabbi Zvi Yosef HaKohen Resnick
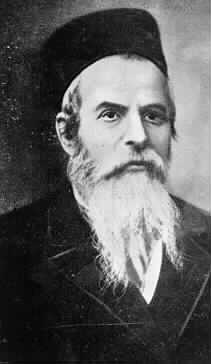
- Rabbi Zvi Yosef HaKohen Resnick

Personal life
- Born: 1841
- Died: March 28, 1912 (aged 70–71)
- Notable work: MiTorat Zvi Yosef (published by his son)
- Known for: Dean of Yeshiva Ohel Yitzhak, Suwałki
- Occupation: Rabbi, Rosh yeshivah

Religious life
- Religion: Judaism
- Denomination: Orthodox

Senior posting
- Post: Rosh Yeshivah

Rabbi Zvi Hirsh Yosef HaKohen Resnick (1841–1912) was an orthodox rabbi and Rosh yeshiva (dean of a yeshiva), also known as Rebbe Hirsch Meitsheter (reportedly because Meitshet—the Yiddish term for Molchad—was the birthplace of his wife).

== Life and work ==
Resnick lived in Zhetel (Dziatlava), a town in Belarus. At least, one of his children was born there, but it is not clear where he himself was born. He taught in Slonim for many years, where his reputation grew to such an extent that he was often referred to as The Slonimer. He was widely respected as one of the great Torah sages of his time, able to quote from the entire Talmud and its commentaries from memory. In 1894, he was appointed Dean of the famous yeshivah in Suwałki, Poland, Ohel Yitzhak, established by Rabbi Isaac Wildmann. He held this position during increasingly violent times, as evidenced by the story recorded in Yizkor-Book Suwalk, relating how he narrowly averted a severe beating by local Jews who suspected he was a Czarist spy because—as a result of poor eyesight in his later years—he would peer at them in a way that was interpreted as spying. According to this story, Hona, the local baker, recognized him as the yeshiva dean, and dispersed the gang gathering to attack him.

He remained Rosh Yeshivah until his death. He was buried in the Jewish cemetery of Suvalk alongside the great sages of the time, but in World War II the Nazis vandalized the cemetery, stealing most of the gravestones for construction projects, including a swimming pool.

The son of Yitzchak Yaakov Resnick, Resnick was a Kohen—a descendant of Aaron, the brother of Moses—and at his funeral, the eulogy delivered by Rabbi Moshe Bezalel Luria, of Suvalk, stated that if the Temple in Jerusalem were still standing, Resnick would have been worthy of serving as the Kohen Gadol, the High Priest of the Jewish people.

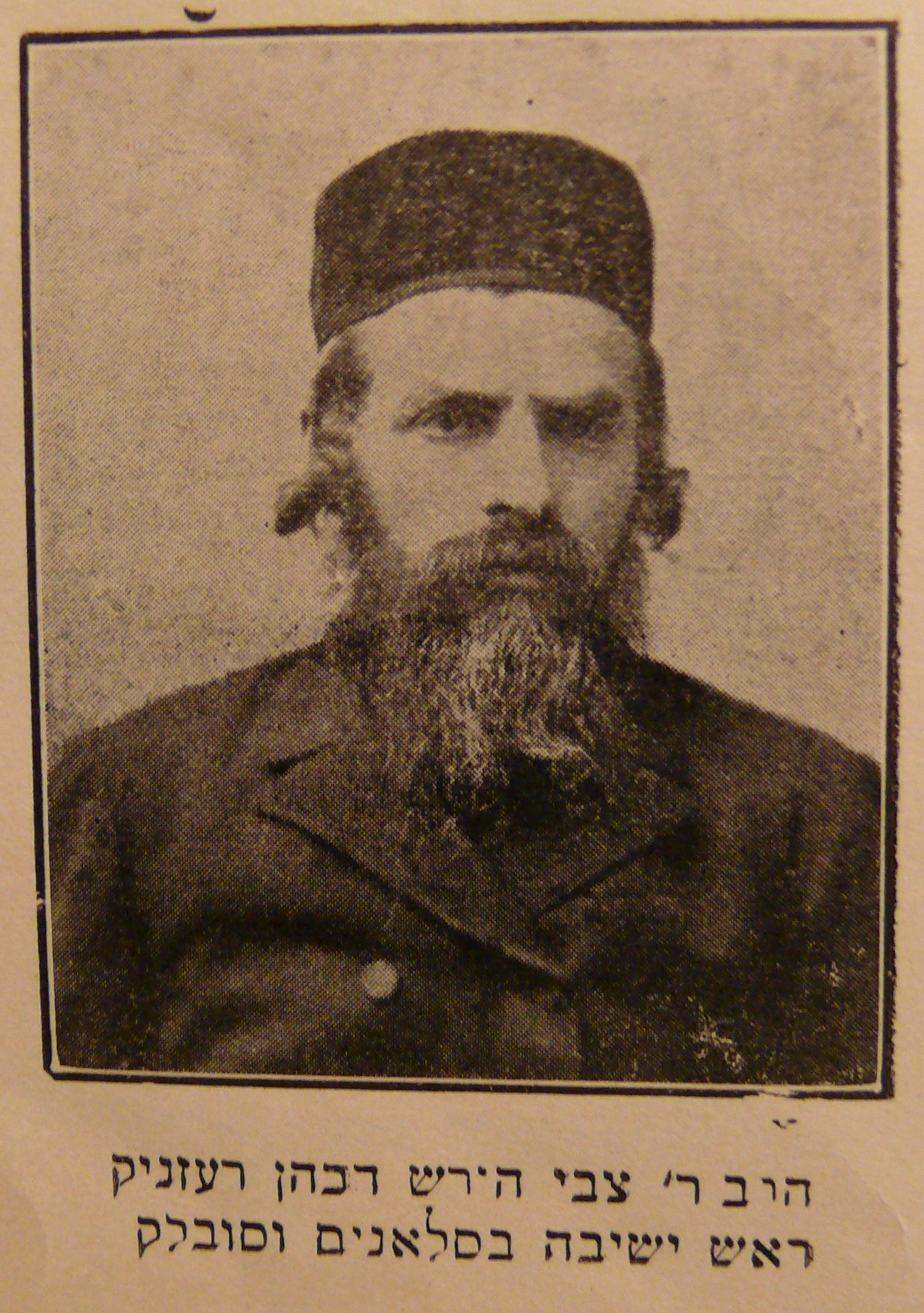
Resnick (photo published in 1909)

The status of being Kohanim, members of the Priestly tribe, was important to both Resnick and his son, Risikoff, but because of a sense of history and responsibility, not pride, and in Risikoff's book, HaKohanim v'HaLevi'im, he recalls how his father taught the importance of humility, and the avoidance of any action or word based on pride or the desire for prestige. He writes that Resnick even forbade him to tell stories about him that could be considered to be praise, unless there was some musar, ethical teaching, that could be derived from the story. So, for example, Risikoff relates in this book how once there was a large fire in Slonim, when his father lived there—and many people in the town, including other Kohanim, were bringing their belongings to the cemetery, which was located in one of the safe areas—but his father, based on the fact that Kohanim were not normally allowed to enter cemeteries, refused to do so, saying it was better to lose all their belongings than to go to the cemetery.

Resnick was so respected that distinguished rabbis including Rabbi Yossel Shlufefer, the rabbi of Slonim, would come to Resnick every year before the holy day of Yom Kippur to request his blessing, and the Slonim rabbi Yehoshua Isaac Shapiro (known as "Reb Eizel Charif"), went on record as saying that anyone who had not studied under Resnick was "no scholar."

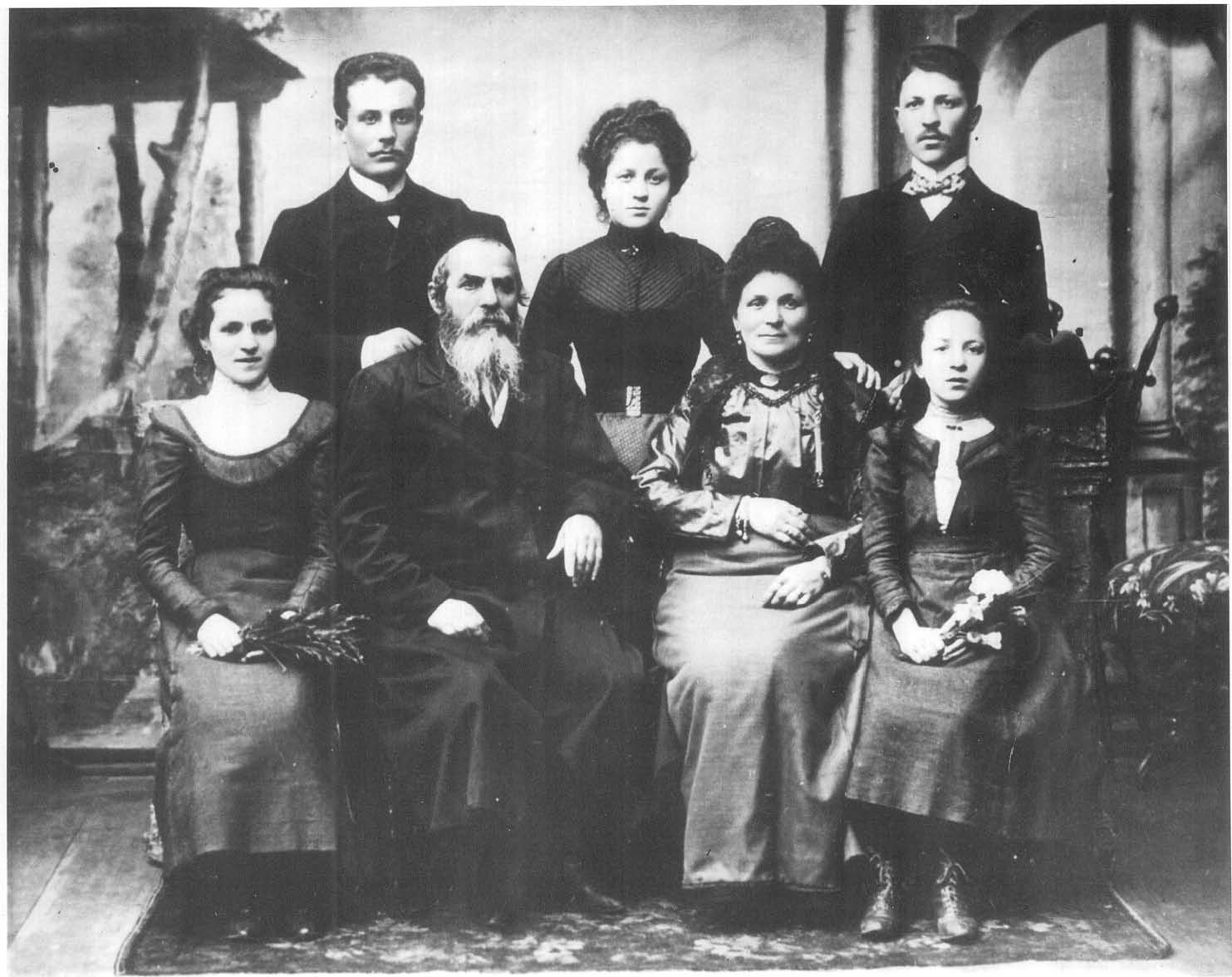
Resnick and family, Russia

Resnick rejected many requests to accept positions of official community rabbi, or to publish his teachings and commentaries, stating that such work would detract from his studies. However, some of his teachings are recorded in the works of his son, Rabbi Mnachem HaKohen Risikoff, especially in the book, MiTorat Zvi Yosef, From the Torah of Zvi Yosef. In this work, Risikoff, a renowned scholar in his own right, reminisces about his father, noting that his own knowledge, compared to that of his father, is like "a drop in the ocean." He writes that his father shunned fame, although many of his students went on to accept positions as rabbis for important cities, and that his father not only denied himself the time to write down his teachings (although many of his students did write and publish his ideas), he even denied himself the time for correspondence, only including a few brief short sentences in letters he had to write, or letters he wrote to his children. He also notes that his father was not only renowned for his knowledge of Torah (and all Jewish teachings), but for his nature: that he never had an altercation or bad relationship, and that he was not only respected by his students, but beloved by them, as well.

Resnick was mentioned in a number of works by others, including Rabbi Avraham Aaron Yudlovitz, in "Darash Av"; and in the article, "Kehilat Yaakov BeSlonim," by the Slonim author, M. Zavlutzky, published in "Kneset HaGedolah" (Vol 4), in Warsaw, in 1891.

== Family ==
In addition to his son, Mnachem Risikoff, many other descendants of Resnick became rabbis, including grandson Leon Risikoff, and great-grandsons Arnold Resnicoff, Steven (Shlomo Chaim) Resnicoff, and Joseph Simckes. Another son of Resnick, Solomon "Shlomo" Chaim Resnick, was a well-known cantor, known as the Grajewo Hazzan.
