= Eduardo Mallea =

Argentine writer (1903–1982)

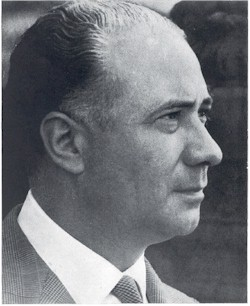
Eduardo Mallea

Eduardo Mallea (14 August 1903 in Bahía Blanca – 12 November 1982 in Buenos Aires) was an Argentine essayist, cultural critic, writer and diplomat. In 1931 he became editor of the literary magazine of La Nación.

== Works ==
- Cuentos para una inglesa desesperada (1926, ed. Gleizer)
- Conocimiento y expresión de la Argentina (1935, Essay, Buenos Aires, Sur)
- Nocturno Europeo (1935, Novel, Buenos Aires Sur)
- La Ciudad junto al rio inmóvil (1936, Nine Short Novels, Buenos Aires, Sur)
- Historia de una pasión Argentina (1937, essay, Buenos Aires, Sur)
- Fiesta en Noviembre (1938, Buenos Aires, Club del Libro A.L.A.)
- Meditación en la costa (1939, Buenos Aires, Imprenta Mercatali)
- La Bahía del Silencio (1940, Buenos Aires, Sudamericana)
- El sayal y la púrpura (1941, essay, Buenos Aires, Losada)
- Todo verdor perecerá (1943, novel, Buenos Aires, Espasa-Calpe)
- Las Águilas (1944, novel, Buenos Aires, Sudamericana)
- Rodeada esta de sueño (1946, Buenos Aires, Espasa-Calpe)
- El retorno (1946, Buenos Aires, Espasa-Calpe)
- El vínculo. Los Rembrandts. La rosa de Cernobbio. (1946, Noveulles, Emecé)
- Los enemigos del alma (1950, novel, Buenos Aires, Sudamericana)
- La Torre (1951, novel, Buenos Aires, Sudamericana)
- Chaves (1953, novel, Buenos Aires, Emecé)
- La sala de espera (1953, Buenos Aires, Sudamericana)
- Notas de un novelista (1954, essays, Buenos Aires, Losada)
- Simbad (1957, novel, Sudamericana)
- El gajo de enebro (1957, Buenos Aires, Emecé)
- Posesión (1958, nouvelles, Buenos Aires, Sudamericana)
- La razón humana (1959, nouvelles, Buenos Aires, Losada)
- La vida Blanca (1960, Buenos Aires, Sur)
- Las Travesías I (1961, Buenos Aires, Sudamericana)
- Las Travesías II (1962, Buenos Aires, Sudamericana)
- La representación de los aficionados (1962, Buenos Aires, Sudamericana)
- La guerra interior (1963, essay, Buenos Aires, Sudamericana)
- Poderío de la novela (1965, essay, Buenos Aires, Aguilar)
- El resentimiento (1966, noveulles, Buenos Aires, Sudamericana)
- La barca de hielo (1967, short stories, Buenos Aires, Sudamericana)
- La red (1968, short stories, Buenos Aires, Sudamericana)
- La penúltima puerta (1969, Buenos Aires, Sudamericana)
- Triste piel del universo (1971, novel, Buenos Aires, Sudamericana)
- Gabriel Andaral (1971, Buenos Aires, Sudamericana)
- En la creciente oscuridad (1973, Buenos Aires, Sudamericana)
- Los papeles privados (1974, essay, Buenos Aires, Sudamericana)
- La mancha en el mármol (1982, short stories, Buenos Aires, Sudamericana)
- La noche enseña a la noche (1985, novel, Buenos Aires, Sudamericana)

== See also ==
- Literature of Argentina
