= Stepan Reznik =

Russian footballer and manager

Personal information
- Full name: Stepan Aleksandrovich Reznik
- Date of birth: 6 January 1983 (age 43)
- Place of birth: Krasnodar, Russian SFSR
- Height: 1.78 m (5 ft 10 in)
- Position: Midfielder

Team information
- Current team: FC Magnat Krasnodar (manager)

Youth career
- FShM Moscow

Senior career*
Years	Team	Apps	(Gls)
2000–2003	FC Lokomotiv Moscow	0	(0)
2000	→ FC Lokomotiv-d Moscow	9	(0)
2003	FC Krasnodar-2000	15	(0)
2004	FC Kuban Krasnodar	0	(0)
2005	FC Dynamo Barnaul	17	(2)
2006	FC Krasnodar-2000	23	(1)
2007	FC Molniya Nebug		
2007	FC Dynamo Stavropol	11	(0)
2008	FC Dynamo Krasnodar		
2009	FC Torpedo Armavir	21	(0)
2010	FC Biolog-Novokubansk (amateur)		
2011–2012	FC Biolog-Novokubansk	16	(0)
2012–2014	FC Flayt Protichka		
2015–2017	FC Magnat Krasnodar		

Managerial career
- 2016–: FC Magnat Krasnodar
- * Club domestic league appearances and goals

Stepan Aleksandrovich Reznik (Russian: Степан Александрович Резник; born 6 January 1983) is a Russian professional football coach and a former player. He manages FC Magnat Krasnodar.

== Club career ==
He made his debut for FC Lokomotiv Moscow on 29 March 2003 in a Russian Premier League Cup game against FC Torpedo-Metallurg Moscow, also making an appearance in the return leg of the matchup. He made his debut for FC Kuban Krasnodar on 24 March 2004 in a Russian Cup game against FC Terek Grozny.
