= Mnachem Risikoff =

Orthodox rabbi (1866–1960)

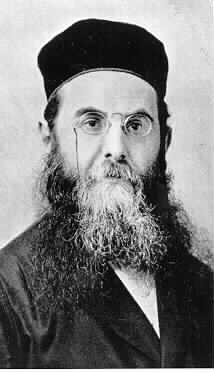
Mnachem HaKohen Risikoff

Mnachem (Mendel) HaKohen Risikoff (1866–July 28, 1960), was an orthodox rabbi in Russia and the United States, and a prolific author of scholarly works, written in Hebrew. Risikoff used a highly stylized and symbolic pen-name, יאמהדנונחהים, made up of the Hebrew letters of his first name, the Hebrew word for Lord, and the Tetragrammaton, one of Judaism's terms for God. It is not clear whether this pen name was used in conversation, or whether it was used only in his writings.

== Life and work ==
Risikoff, the son of well-known Rosh yeshiva (Talmudic Academy Dean) Rabbi Zvi Yosef Resnick, was born in Zhetel, later studying in yeshivot, academies, in Volozhin and Vilna, where he received semikhah (rabbinic ordination) at the age of 17 from a number of well-known rabbis: Yosef Shlupfer, from Slonim; Avraham DovBer HaKohen Shapira, from Riga; Shlomo HaKohen, author of Binyan Shlomo, from Vilna; Katriel Nathan, Av Beit Din of Augustów; and Eliyahu Adran, of Grajewo; with other rabbis later adding their ordination as well.

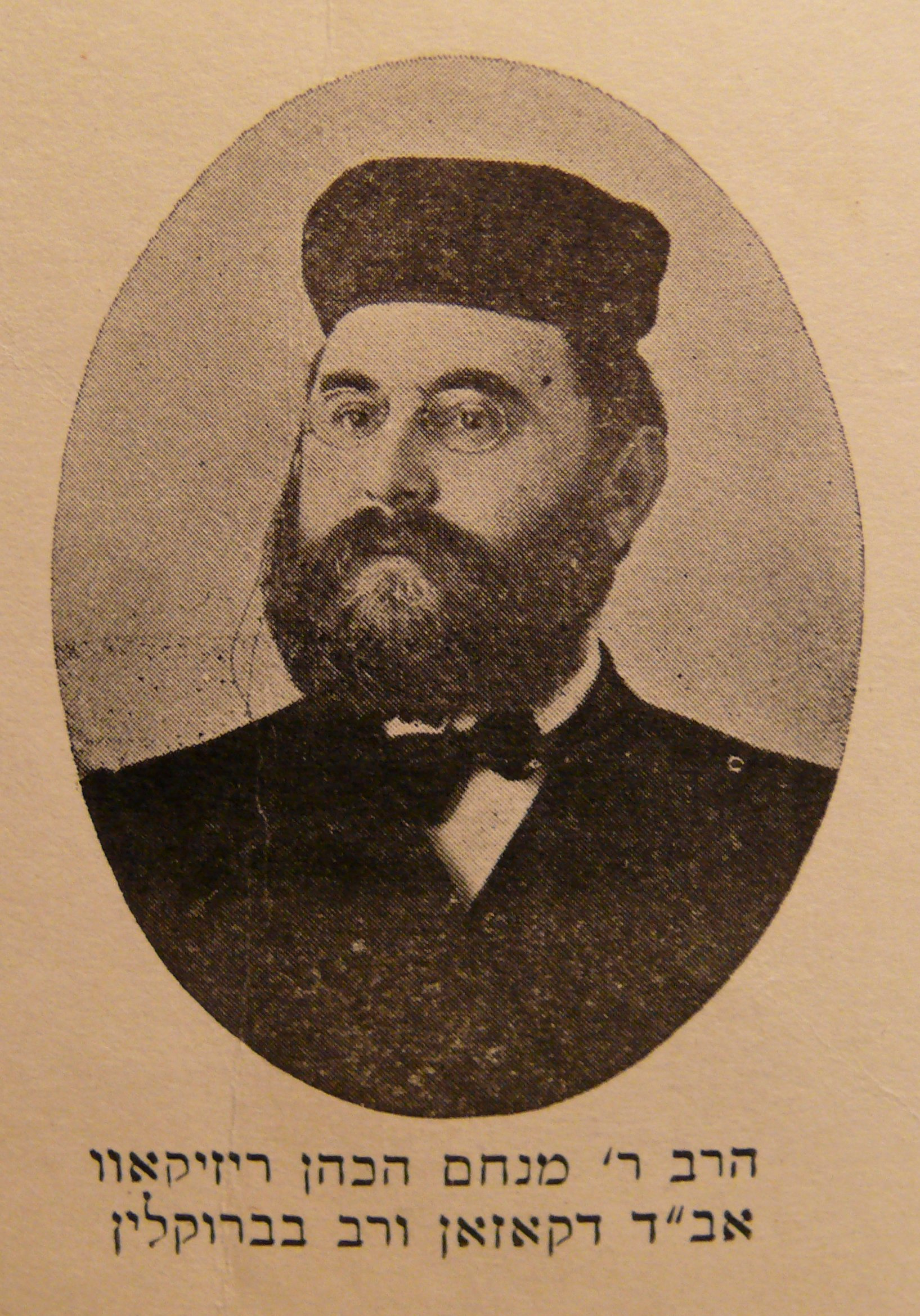
Risikoff as a young man

In 1895, after serving as a rabbi in a small town in Lithuania, he was appointed rabbi of Kazan. He emigrated to the United States in 1906, following anti-Jewish riots in that area, serving as rabbi in a number of synagogues in Brooklyn, including Ohev Shalom, in Brownsville; Keter Israel; Beth Ha-Knesseth Adath B'Nai Israel, also referred to as Williamsburg's Moore Street Congregation; and finally, Dibre Mnachem, a congregation named after the first book Risikoff published after moving to the United States, located in the area now known as Bedford-Stuyvesant, on one floor of the building where he lived for many years, until his death in 1960.

His stationery listed him as רב ואב״ד לאגודת הקהלות דברוקלין -- "Rabbi of the Orthodoctical [sic] Congregations of Brooklyn." In addition, he served as the Recording Secretary of the Knesseth HaRabonim HaOrthdoksim dAmerica vCanada, the Assembly of Orthodox Rabbis of America and Canada.

Risikoff was a frequent contributor to The Degel Israel Torah Journal, and the author of numerous works on Halakha and Aggadah, Jewish law and Jewish lore; Biblical commentaries; Divrei Torah (sermons and homiletical writings); and responsa, including Shaarei Zevah (1913), dealing with the laws of kashrut and shechita; Shaarei Shamayim (1937), a commentary on the Jewish legal compilation, the Shulchan Aruch; and Torat HaKohanim (1948), the laws pertaining to Kohanim, Jewish priests, the descendants of Aaron, the brother of Moses, a group which included Risikoff himself. This latter work included explanations and commentaries on the rituals still performed by kohanim today, including pidyon haben (Redemption of the First Born), and birkat kohanim (the Priestly Blessing). Additionally, after explaining the laws and customs regarding such rituals, he added homiletical commentaries. For example, he explained that the mitzvah of Brit milah (circumcision) tied a new-born baby to the covenant of faith, but the combination of circumcision and pidyon haben was like a double knot. Further, because not all families qualified for the ceremony of pidyon haben on their own, all Jews could participate in the commandment by attending the ritual and celebrating the happiness of others.

However, the book, Torat Hakohanim, also included instruction on priestly responsibilities only applicable during the existence of the Jerusalem Temple, because of his fervent belief that redemption would come, and the Temple would be rebuilt. In the meantime, he believed that studying the laws served as a substitute for carrying out the duties, and would bring the coming of the Messiah closer.

Risikoff's strong mystical beliefs, in addition to his command of legal sources, was evident in his frequent references to kabbalah and Hassidic masters, like the Baal Shem Tov. His link to Jewish mysticism was also manifest in his belief in the power of language, numbers, and words, sometimes writing prayers or sections of his works using words whose initial letters spelled out his own name, the name of God, or even the letters used to indicate the Jewish year. His book, Palgei Shemen, includes a congratulatory letter he received on the occasion of his fiftieth wedding anniversary from President Franklin Delano Roosevelt, and his response, in which he attributes meaning to each of the President's three names and three initials. For example, one of the explanations he offers for "FDR" was friend (F) to both democrats (D) and republicans (R).

Many of his writings included endorsements not only from some of the leading rabbis in the United States, but also in Jerusalem, including Tzvi Pesach Frank, and Abraham Yitzchak HaKohen Kook, the Ashkenazi Chief Rabbi of the pre-Israel British Mandate of Palestine.

=== Risikoff's views regarding the agunah ===
Risikoff's encyclopedic grasp of Jewish sources and his commitment to orthodox Judaism were so well respected that he could be a strong voice for discussions of innovative solutions to modern problems and challenges facing Jewish law. One key example was his proposal for enhanced authority of the modern Beth din, rabbinical court, to help in situations such as the Agunah, a woman whose husband had left her without granting her a Get, the religious divorce decree that would allow her to remarry.

In his writings, he advanced the idea, even before the establishment of the modern State of Israel, that some solution might be found in a worldwide Jewish recognition of the special authority of the Jerusalem Beth-Din. He introduced the idea, at least as one worthy of serious discussion within the realm of Halakhah, Jewish law, that the groom could declare that he was not only marrying the bride in accordance with "the laws of Moses and Israel" (kedat Mosheh weYisrael) the normal formulaic wording for a Jewish ceremony, but also, "in accordance with the Great Rabbinical Court of Jerusalem" (ukhdat Bet Din HaGadol biYerushalayim), so that the court could then step in to help a woman whose husband's actions violated the intrinsic meaning of the covenant of marriage, including that meaning as interpreted and understood by the court—declaring, in essence, that the marriage never took place, or was retroactively annulled. Similar ideas would be discussed by other orthodox thinkers after Israel's creation in 1948, but Risikoff was clearly ahead of his time—as one writer put it, writing "in apparent anticipation of future events"—in terms of such thinking.

An alternative approach to the problem, also introduced by Risikoff as a theoretical possibility worthy of halakhic discussion, was the reintroduction of the ancient institution of Pilegesh, an alternative category to formal marriage (and one that would not have the same requirements for a Get upon the dissolution of the relationship).

=== Risikoff's responses to the Holocaust ===
Another area in which Risikoff's writings represented ideas ahead of his time was the subject of religious responses to the Shoah, an area that would only much later be referred to as Holocaust theology. He fervently believed that redemption would come for humanity, but never turned a blind eye to suffering, struggling with the existence of evil, its meaning, and the question of human response to it. His writings showed his sorrow and horror at the anti-Jewish attacks in Hebron, Jerusalem, and Safed, in 1929, and when Rav Kook died in 1935, Risikoff—with "a presentiment of the catastrophe" yet to come—published a eulogy in which he put forth his belief that Kook might have been taken early to spare him from even worse times to come, based on the Biblical verse (Isaiah 57:11), "The righteous is taken away from the evil to come."

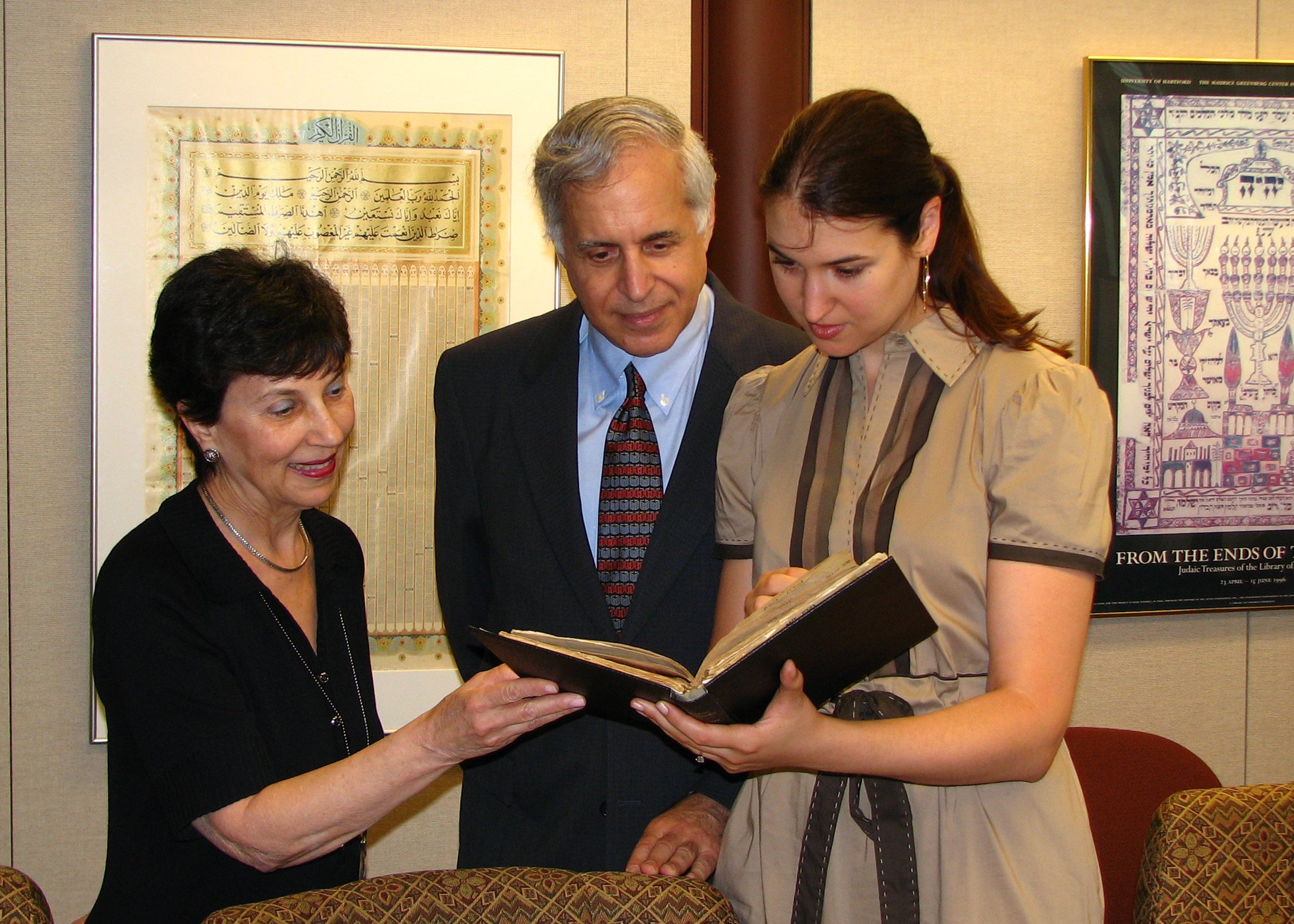
Dr. Peggy Pearlstein, Head, Hebraica Section, African and Middle Eastern Division, U.S. Library of Congress, accepts two unpublished manuscripts written by Risikoff on behalf of the Library. Pictured with her are Risikoff's grandson and great-granddaughter, Rabbi Arnold Resnicoff and Malka Sarit Resnicoff. June 7, 2010.

In 1938, with the outbreak of violence that would come to be known as Kristallnacht, Risikoff wrote about keeping faith, and yet taking action in religious ways that would include worship, liturgy, and both concrete and internal responses of teshuva/repentance. He wrote that Levites, members of the Levitical tribe—and especially Kohanim, the family dynasty of Jewish Priests within that tribe—must play a special role. In his writings, especially in his book, HaKohanim vHaLeviim, The Priests and the Levites, he stressed that members of these groups exist in the realm between history (below) and redemption (above), and were called upon to take a leading role in a call to prayer, repentance, and action that would help bring an end to suffering. He wrote, "Today, we also are living through a time of flood, Not of water, but of a bright fire, which burns and turns Jewish life into ruin. We are now drowning in a flood of blood...Through the Kohanim and Levi'im help will come to all Israel.

His writings reflected a combination of what has been called meta-history (ultimate redemption) and history, including the idea that part of the problem on earth was dishonesty not only among individuals, but also among nations. For example, with a keen eye to developments in politics and current events, he wrote that governments of a number of nations had promised Austria and Czechoslovakia that they would come to their defense if the need arose, but they ultimately broke their promises. On the other hand, when he wrote the words, "Nazis", "swastikas", and "Mussolini", he spelled their names backwards as a way, linked to mystical traditions and beliefs, to obliterate those names, and the existence of those represented by the names. This ability to deal with two worlds was noted by one scholar who wrote that Risikoff "distilled metahistory into history with his program for priestly action to mediate redemption."

Risikoff's ability to deal with practical questions, rooted in reality, even as he kept faith in the promise of ultimate redemption, was clear in his response to the question as to whether Jews in Europe during the Holocaust should "accept martyrdom" for their faith, or escape if they could, to preserve their lives. He responded that it was clear in many Jewish sources that there were times to accept death for the sake of our faith (Mesirut nefesh al kiddush Hashem: submitting the soul in sanctification of God’s name), but that Hitler was not out to crush the Jewish faith, since (unlike some earlier enemies of the Jews) Jews were not given the option of conversion or abandoning their faith in order to live. Instead, Hitler's goal was to destroy the Jewish people, and therefore the responsibility to preserve life (individual life and the life of the people) became paramount so that Jews could continue to perform God's commandments, and flight was therefore one valid option.

A 1942 article in "The Brooklyn Daily Eagle" noted that Risikoff believed that fighting against evil was also a valid option:

A proud man is Rabbi Mnachem Resnicoff [sic] of 691 Lafayette Ave, one of the borough's scholars of Hebraic law and the Talmud, for his three sons have dropped their civilian duties to fight for the preservation of democratic freedoms.
Although a firm believer in settling differences by peaceful means, the venerable, bearded member of the rabbinate reverted to the teachings of Moses and Solomon and gladly sent forth his sons to defeat those who persecute his people.
One son, Murray H. Resnicoff, is a Lt. Colonel in the Army, and Jack, an attorney, enlisted in the Navy two days after the treacherous attack on Pearl Harbor. He has received a first class yeoman's rating, and is stationed "somewhere in the South Pacific." The third son, Samuel, also an attorney, and for many years active in Borough politics, is a member of the enlisted reserve corps, and was ordered to report for active duty September 21.

Risikoff's writings clearly reveal how he struggled to accept what was one traditional religious response to suffering—the idea that it was punishment for sin, and a call to repentance—and early on did consider that Hitler might somehow be part of such a divine plan. But he ultimately wrote that it was not possible to accept the idea that blame for a tragedy of the magnitude of the Holocaust could be understood in this way. He wrote that such extreme suffering could never come from God, for God acted according to Torah

=== Unpublished manuscripts ===
On June 7, 2010, unpublished manuscripts for two of Risikoff's works, "Shaarei Mizrach" and "Zikron Mnachem," were given to the Library of Congress. The gift was made on behalf of two of Risikoff's grandsons, Rabbi Arnold E. Resnicoff and Professor Steven H. Resnicoff, to be restored and preserved as part of the library's permanent Hebraica collection. Arnold Resnicoff was present at the ceremony, along with his daughter, Malka Sarit Resnicoff, Risikoff's great-granddaughter.

== Family ==
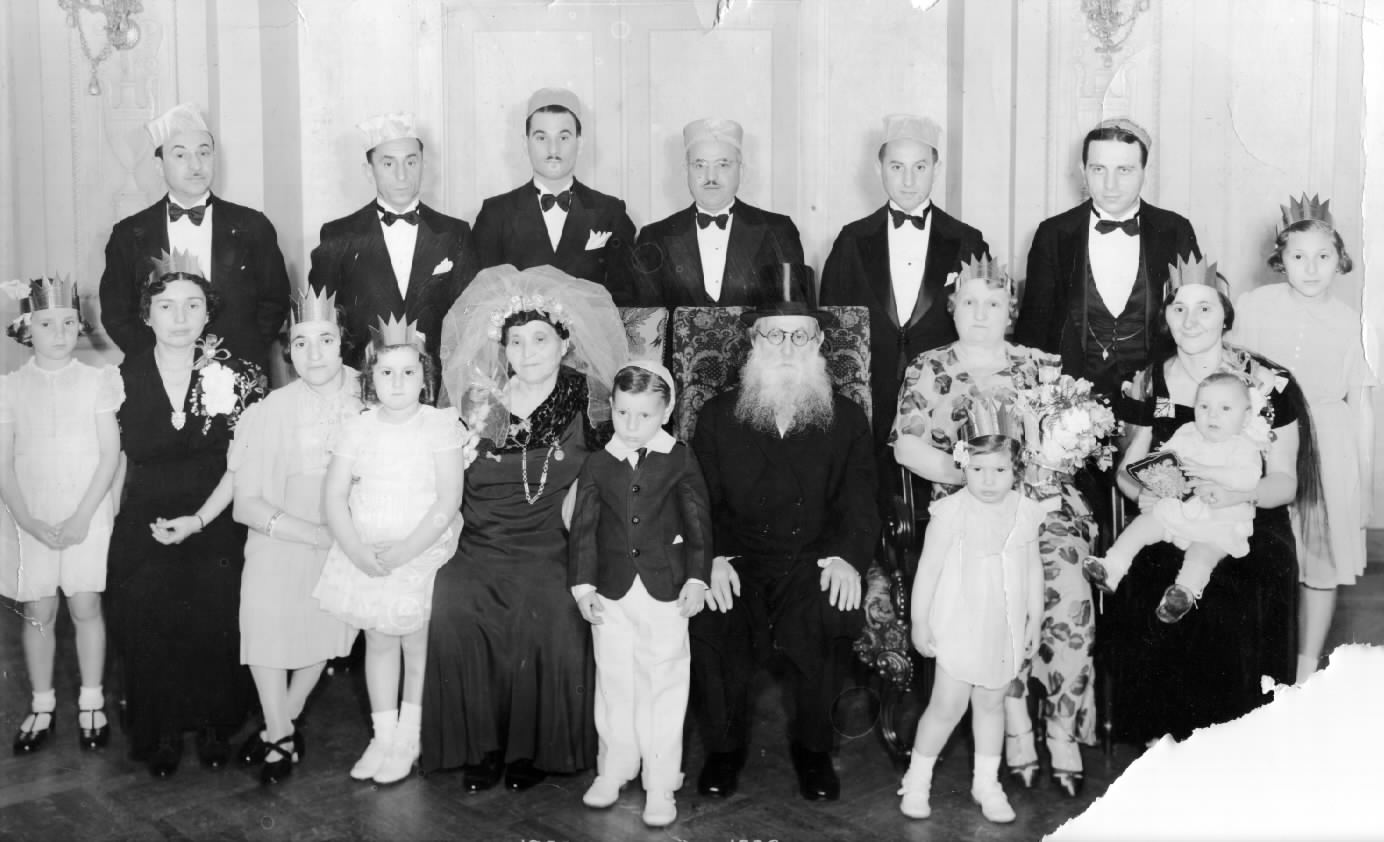
50th Wedding Anniversary, 1938.

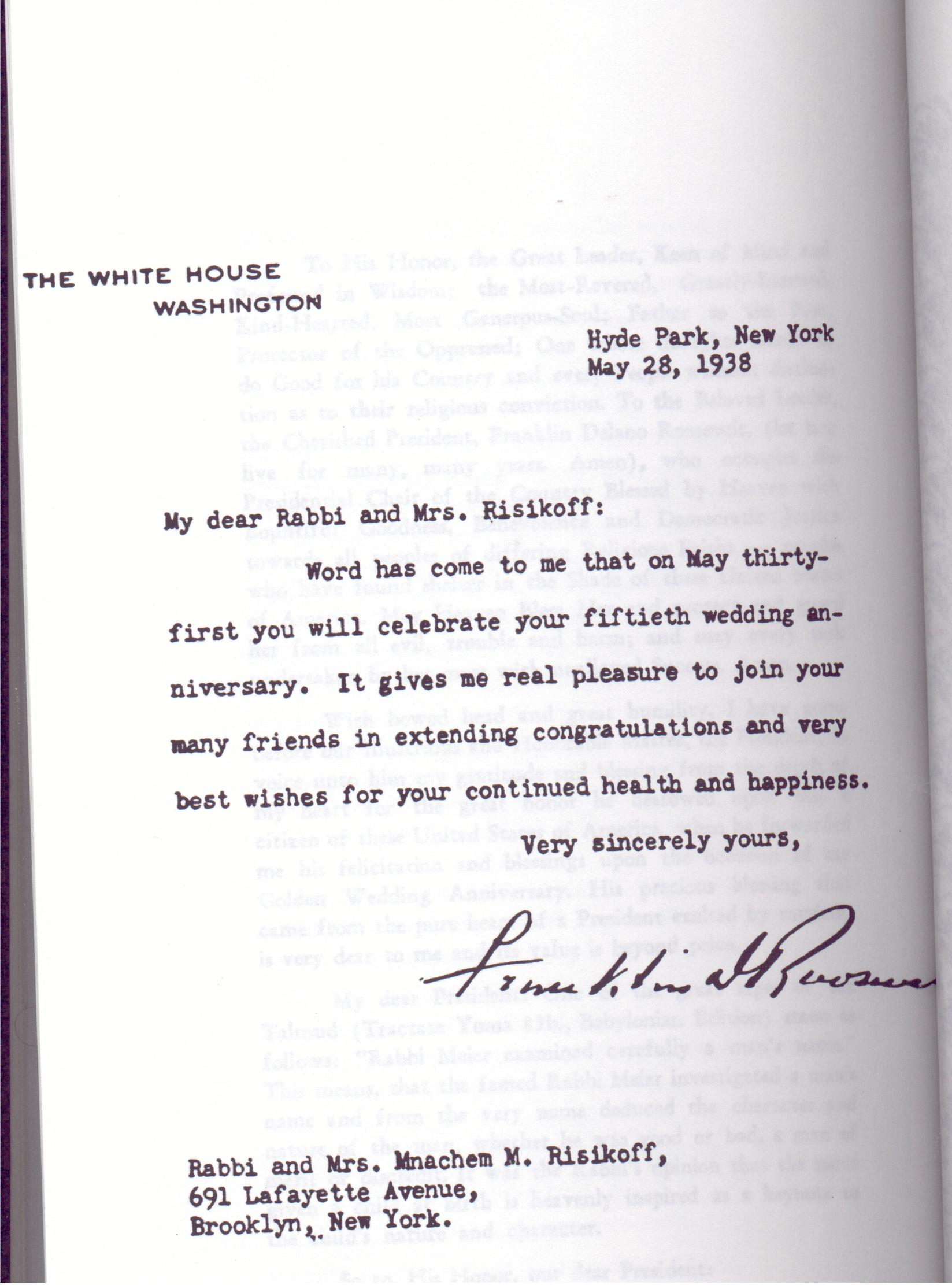
Letter from President Roosevelt to Risikoff, congratulating him on his 50th wedding anniversary

Risikoff's father, Zvi Yosef Resnick, a distinguished Rosh yeshiva in Suvalk and Slonim, had rejected many requests to publish his teachings and commentaries. He said that he did not want to take any time away from studying and teaching. However, Resnick did include a short written note in his son's book, Shaarei Zevach, as an haskama (rabbinic endorsement) of the book, and an opportunity to express his pride in his son's achievements., so Risikoff included some of his father's teachings in his works, especially in the volume MiTorat Zvi Yosef ("From the Torah [teachings] of Zvi Yosef"). In his praise for his father in this work, Risikoff states that his own knowledge is like "a drop in the ocean" compared to that of his father.

One of Risikoff's brothers, Shlomo Chaim Resnick, was a cantor/hazzan, mohel, and shohet, referred to as the Grajewo Hazzan. One of Risikoff's sons, Leon Risikoff, was a rabbi in Brooklyn, New York; his son-in-law, Herbert Simckes, was a rabbi in Massachusetts; and three of his grandsons, Arnold Resnicoff, Steven (Shlomo Chaim) Resnicoff, and Joseph Simckes, are American rabbis.

=== Names ===
The discrepancy between Risikoff's last name and the family name, Resnick (or Resnikoff/Resnicoff, the Russian equivalent for "son of Resnick"), was the result of a name change, coupled with a physical relocation in Russia, as attempts to avoid the harsh Russian military draft that specifically targeted very young Jewish men, as part of a purposeful targeted attempt to weaken the Jewish community.

"Mendel" is the Yiddish equivalent for the Hebrew name, "Mnachem."

Risikoff's first name, "Mnachem," appears in variant forms including "Menachem" and "Menahem," but "Mnachem" is the spelling he seems to have preferred during his time in the United States, and was the spelling used in writings that spanned many years—from the 1938 letter from President Franklin Delano Roosevelt, congratulating Risikoff on his 50th wedding anniversary; a news story in the Brooklyn Eagle about Risikoff that referred to him as "one of the oldest Orthodox rabbis in Brooklyn; a photo and caption on file with the Brooklyn Public Library; and the 2010 press release from the Library of Congress that described the donation of two of Risikoff's unpublished manuscripts. (In another Brooklyn Eagle article, Mnachem is used as the spelling of his first name, although his last name is spelled differently.) Most importantly, however, "Mnachem Risikoff" was the spelling Risikoff used on his own printed stationery.

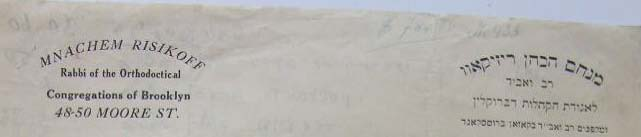
Heading on Risikoff's personal stationery

== Hebrew works ==
=== Published works (online links to complete texts) ===
All of the following books (in Hebrew) are available for free download from HebrewBooks.org:

- תפארת מנחם Tiferet Mnachem (1894)
- דברי מנחם Divrei Mnachem (1911)
- שערי זבח Shaarei Zevach (1913)
- מתורת צבי יוסף MiTorat Zvi Yosef (1925)
- שערי רצון א Shaarei Ratzon, Vol I (1931)
- שערי רצון ב Shaarei Ratzon, Vol II (1931)
- שערי שמים חלק א Shaarei Shamayim, Vol I (1937)
- שערי שמים חלק ב Shaarei Shamayim, Vol II (1937)
- שערי שמים חלק ג Shaarei Shamayim, Vol III (1937)
- שערי שמים חלק ד Shaarei Shamayim, Vol IV (1937)
- שערי שמים חלק ה Shaarei Shamayim, Vol V (1937)
- פלגי שמן Palgei Shemen (1939)
- הכהנים והלוים HaKohanim vHaLeviim(1940)
- לקוטי דינים תורת הכהנים Likutei Dinim Torat HaKohanim (1948)

=== Unpublished manuscripts (online links to texts) ===
- Shaarei Mizrach שערי מזרח
- Zikhron Mnachem זכרון מנחם

== See also ==
- Video: Remarks by Dr. Gershon Greenberg, June 7, 2010, Library of Congress acceptance of Risikoff's two unpublished manuscripts.
