= International Military Chiefs of Chaplains Conference =

The International Military Chiefs of Chaplains Conference is an organization of the principal leaders of the national groups of military chaplains. Begun as a conference of the heads of chaplaincies of countries in the NATO alliance, it has expanded its participation.

In February 1990, the United States European Command (USEUCOM) convened and hosted a NATO Chiefs of Chaplains Conference, in Stuttgart, Germany. In 1991, a second conference took place in Church House, British Army of the Rhine, Lübbecke, Germany. During its discussions, the conference title was changed to the North America/European Chiefs of Chaplains Conference. Participants also discussed the possibility of expanding the forum to include countries from the former Warsaw Pact. The following year, in February 1992, the conference was held for the first time in a location outside of Germany, taking place in Rome, Italy. The conference was co-sponsored by USEUCOM and the Italian Ministry of Defense. Co-sponsorship by USEUCOM and the Ministry of Defense of the conference host nation became the model for future conferences. Additionally, the conference title was changed to the "International Military Chiefs of Chaplains Conference".

In later years, the conference further expanded to include chiefs of chaplains from other nations within the USEUCOM area of responsibility, an area that included many nations in Africa before the establishment of the United States Africa Command (USAFRICOM). Eventually, any chief of chaplains (or chaplain general, an equivalent term used by many nations) was welcomed from any nation's military, and the conference soon included participants from countries as far away from the USEUCOM headquarters as Australia and South Korea. Additionally, some nations that did not have military chaplains began to send representatives involved with issues of religion for military personnel - and in some cases, this participation helped lead to the establishment of that nation's chaplaincy. In 1997, the conference name was once again changed, to the "International Military Chiefs of Chaplains Conference", its current title.

At the 1999 Military Chiefs of Chaplains Conference, outside Vienna, Austria, more than 90 chaplains from 33 nations discussed the possibility of a chaplains council for NATO.

Because not all nations were represented, the Chaplain General of the South African National Defence Force (SANDF), Brigadier General M. Cornelissen - on behalf of the Chief of SANDF - proposed to co-host the first International Military Chiefs of Chaplains Conference in Cape Town, South Africa.

The 2009 International Chiefs of Chaplains Conference was held in Cape Town, South Africa, the first time the conference was held outside of Europe.

Some nations participating in these conferences have one chief of chaplains or chaplain general, as is the case in Canada and South Africa. Other nations, including the United States, have one chief of chaplains for each branch of the military armed forces. In many other nations, one chief of chaplains is designated for each major religion or faith group represented by a significant number of their military personnel.
