= Liberty Bridge, Zagreb =

Liberty Bridge
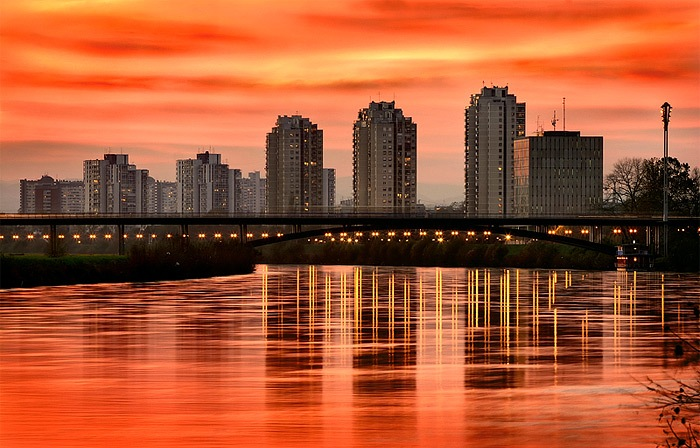
- The bridge during sunset with Trnje behind
- Coordinates: 45.789522°N 15.979655°E
- Carries: Pedestrians, cyclists, 4 lanes of traffic
- Crosses: Sava River
- Locale: South Zagreb, Croatia
- Official name: Most slobode

Characteristics
- Design: steel arch bridge
- Total length: 805 m (2,641 ft)
- Width: 19.4 m (64 ft)
- Longest span: 100 m (328 ft)

History
- Opened: 1959

Liberty Bridge (Croatian: Most slobode) is a four-lane road bridge over Sava River in Zagreb, Croatia. The Većeslav Holjevac Avenue crosses over it, connecting Trnje with Novi Zagreb in the central part of the city. It's one of 8 bridges of Zagreb. Most slobode is one of the most important, busiest and oldest bridges in Zagreb over the Sava River. It is also popularly called the “Middle Zagreb Bridge”. As it is located in the Trnje district, it is sometimes called the “Trnje Bridge”. The bridge is located between Hrvatske bratske zajednice Street and Slavonska Avenue to the north and Većeslav Holjevac Avenue to the south.

== History ==
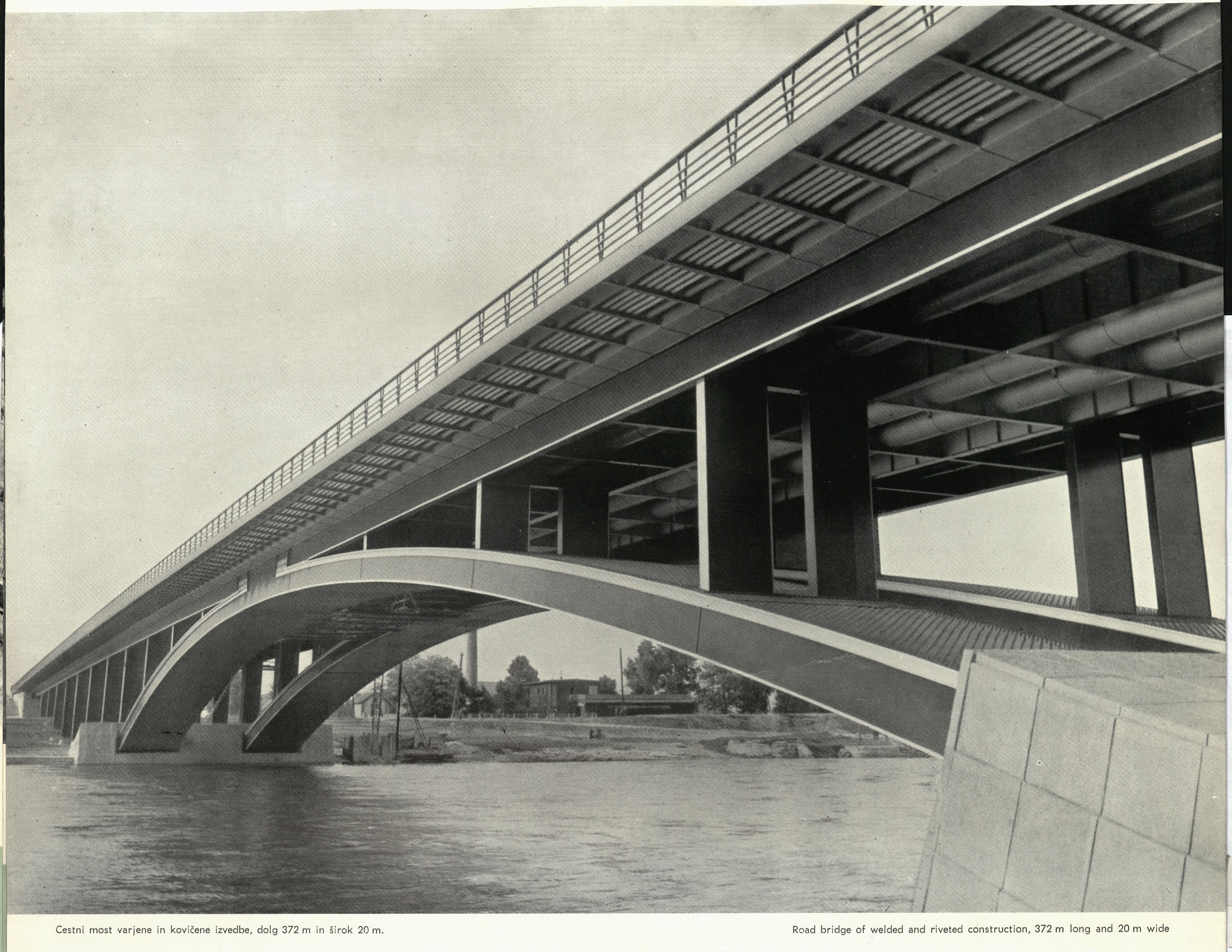
Most slobode in 1963

The two-lane Sava Bridge (today's Pedestrian Bridge) quickly became a traffic junction after the end of World War II. Its capacity was insufficient for the increasing traffic needs, and its location became too far for the daily commute of the residents of Novi Zagreb to the Center. Because of all this, the City Administration began the construction of a new bridge and a new central - southern entrance to Zagreb.

The bridge was opened on September 3, 1959 and it soon became the central bridge in Zagreb and an important communication link between Novi Zagreb and the rest of the city. Before that, the Sava Bridge existed (which was opened in 1938), but it was located to the west, so traveling from Novi Zagreb to the center required a detour. The designer of the Freedom Bridge was Krunoslav Tonković, whose designs had been used to build the Jankomir Bridge a year earlier. About 1,600 tons of steel were used for the bridge. The bridge structure has the shape of a shallow arch. Parts of the bridge are made of stone that was carved on Brač, with each piece of stone being individually drawn and carved.

Most slobode was built with relatively few machines, and one worker died during construction.

== Reconstruction ==
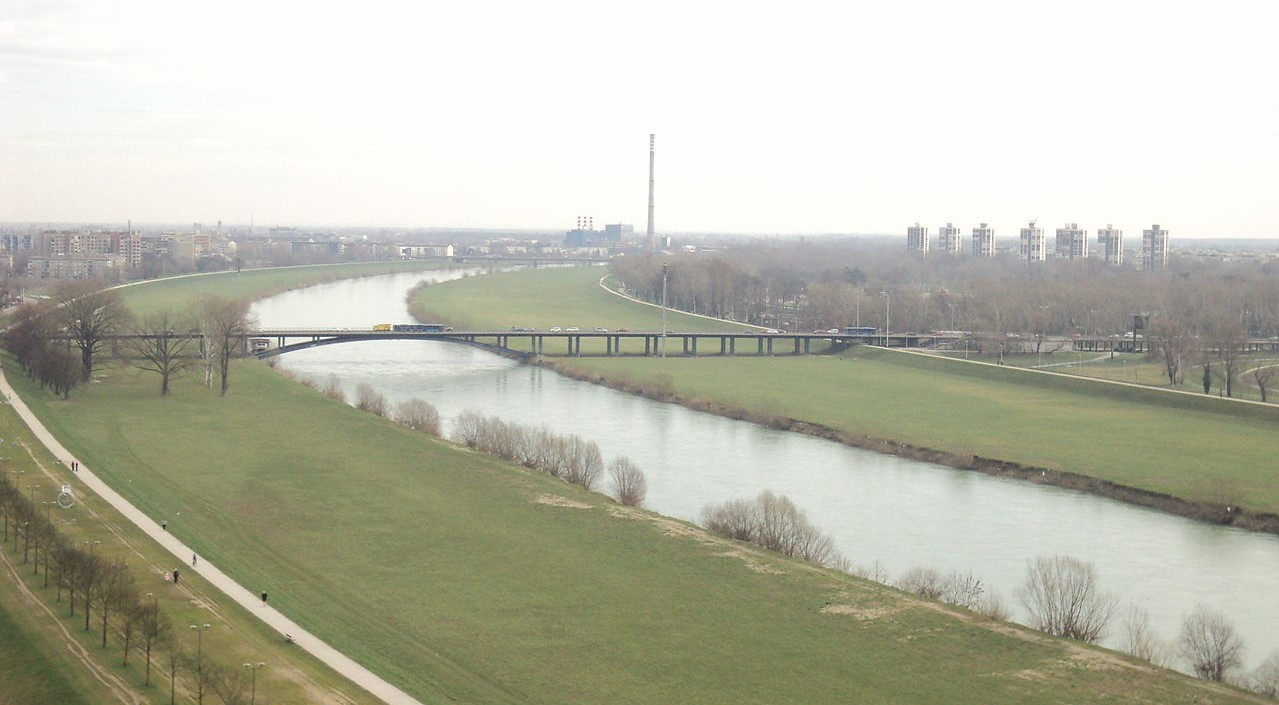
Aerial view of the bridge, 2014

Reconstruction of the bridge started in 2019, after 60 years of its construction. The bridge hasn't been reconstructed since. Movement of pedestrians and cyclists in the work zone was stopped. The first phase of the renovation includes the creation of new footpaths, the rehabilitation of the pedestrian fence and six corrosion-damaged places on the steel arches. Most slobode was renovated in 2019 for 27 million Croatian kuna. The second phase, the installation of new waterproofing and asphalt pavement is planned, the rehabilitation of the reinforced concrete pavement slab is planned, by removing contaminated concrete, installing rehabilitation mortars and concrete, and coating the slab with a protective coating. It is also planned to remove the old and apply new, anti-corrosion protection to the steel arches, transverse and secondary girders, and replace the steel parts of the bridge that have been damaged by rust. A new, vertical and horizontal drainage system will be installed on the bridge, and the fifth arch will be renovated. The completion of all works on the rehabilitation of the Liberty Bridge is planned for 2026 - revealed the Deputy Mayor of Zagreb, Luka Korlaet, adding that the estimated funds required for the planned works are around 17.5 million euros. The bridge is proposed to be open in 2026.

The bridge was closed for all traffic multiple times for reconstruction, marathons and public gatherings.
