= Resnikoff =

Resnikoff is a surname of Russian origin. It may refer to:

- Charles Reznikoff (1894–1976), American poet best known for his long work, Testimony
- Florence Resnikoff (1920–2013), American artist and educator in the fields of metals and jewelry
- Howard L. Resnikoff (1937–2018), American mathematician and business executive.
- Irving Resnikoff (1897–1988), Russian-born portrait painter based in New York
