= Resnik (surname) =

Resnik is a surname. Notable people with the surname include:

- David Resnik (born 1962), American bioethicist
- Frank E. Resnik (1928–1995), former CEO and chairman of Phillip Morris USA
- Hollis Resnik (born 1955), American singer and actress
- Judith Resnik (1949–1986), American astronaut who died in the Space Shuttle Challenger disaster
- Judith Resnik (professor) (born 1950), American legal scholar
- Michael Resnik (born 1938), philosopher of mathematics and decision theory
- Regina Resnik (1922–2013), American opera singer

== See also ==
- Reznik
- Resnik (disambiguation)
- Resnick (surname)
