= Milan Řezníček =

Czech volleyball player (born 1947)

Personal information
- Nationality: Czech
- Born: 22 April 1947 (age 79) Brno, Czechoslovakia

Sport
- Sport: Volleyball

Milan Řezníček (born 22 April 1947) is a Czech volleyball player. He competed in the men's tournament at the 1972 Summer Olympics.
