= Reznikov =

Reznikov (Russian: Ре́зников) is a Slavic and Jewish masculine surname. Its feminine counterpart is Reznikova. Notable people with the surname include:

- Hanon Reznikov (1950–2008), American actor and writer
- Nikol Reznikov (born 1999), Miss Israel 2018
- Oleksii Reznikov (born 1966), Ukrainian politician
- Patricia Reznikov (born 1962), Franco-American writer
- Stanislav Reznikov (born 1986), Russian footballer
- Viktor Reznikov (1952–1992), Russian composer, lyricist and singer
- Vladimir Reznikov (died 1986), Russian-American gangster
- Galina "Red" Reznikov, a character from the Netflix series Orange Is the New Black

== See also ==
- Reznik
