= Franz Reznicek =

Austrian architect

- Born: October 20, 1903; Baden bei Wien, Austria-Hungary
- Occupation: Architect

Franz Reznicek (born 20 October 1903, date of death unknown) was an Austrian architect. After moving to Bludenz, Vorarlberg, where he initially headed an architectural firm with Alois Dönz, he was responsible for the design of numerous modernist buildings in the area during the 1930s.

== Biography and career ==
Franz Reznicek was born 20 October 1903 in Baden bei Wien. At the age of 12, he moved to Innsbruck, where three years later he entered the four-year architecture program at the Bundeslehranstalt für Hochbau (National Institute of High-Rise Building). After interning with his instructor, L. Welzenbacher, Reznicek passed his graduation examination at the institute on 13 February 1923.

Following that he continued to work at the Welzenbacher firm as a full associate. In 1926 he transferred to the Innsbruck City building authority, and two years later became head of the Innsbruck Office of Architecture - North, in Bozen (now Bolzano, Italy).

After participating together with Alois Dönz in the Bregenz National Fire Insurance contest, in 1929 Reznicek relocated to Bludenz and opened an architectural firm with Alois Dönz. Finally in 1936 he succeeded in being accepted into the Zentralvereinigung der Architekten Österreichs (Central Association of Austrian Architects), and in 1949 he took a further examination in civil engineering for the Engineering Bureaux of Tyrol and Vorarlberg.

Following Dönz's retirement, Reznicek led the firm for a further five years before he too retired.

== Works ==
- 1930: Solleder House, Sankt Anton am Arlberg
- 1931: Sauter House, Bludenz
- 1932: Tanzcafé Tannberg, Lech am Arlberg
- 1933: Illustrated book Architekten A. Dönz / F. Reznicek
- 1934: Beck House, Bludenz
- 1937: Resch House, Schaan
- 1938: Vallaster commercial and residential building, Schruns
- 1950: Längle commercial and residential building, Bludenz
- 1951: Expansion of Dörflinger Konditorei-Café, Bludenz
- 1956: Sparkasse Bludenz (savings bank)
- 1962: Obdorf kindergarten, Bludenz
- 1964: Winsauer commercial and residential building, Bludenz

Also included in his works are the Tschofen House, the Unterstein community, the Schadler House, and the Plangg and Pfluger workers' housing. His unrealized designs for a produce grading station in Rankweil (1931) and a country house on the Tschengla/Bürserberg and a mountain hotel (both pre-1933) and sketch for a post office in Lech (also pre-1933) are also important.

== Sources ==
- Renate Breuß and Claudia Wedekind. "Modernität und Traditionalität im Werk der Architekten Alois Dönz und Franz Reznicek" in Bau Handwerk Kunst: Beiträge zur Architekturgeschichte Vorarlbergs im 20. Jahrhundert Institut für Kunstgeschichte, Universität Innsbruck, 1994 (exhibition catalog)
