= Begegnungen =

Compilation album by Eno Moebius Roedelius Plank
- Released: 1984
- Recorded: 1976–1982
- Genre: Ambient; Electronic music Kosmische Musik
- Length: 35:05
- Label: Sky Records

Professional ratings
Review scores
Source	Rating
Allmusic	4/5 stars
Pitchfork Media	(8.1/10)

Begegnungen (German for "meetings" or "encounters") is a Sky Records 1984 collection of music by Brian Eno, Dieter Moebius, Hans-Joachim Roedelius and Conny Plank, compiled from these seven solo and collaborative albums released by Sky between 1976 and 1983:

- Durch die Wüste (Roedelius' first solo album)
- Rastakraut Pasta (Moebius and Plank)
- After the Heat (Eno, Moebius and Roedelius)
- Tonspuren (Moebius' first solo album)
- Zero Set (Moebius, Plank, Neumeier)
- Sowiesoso (Cluster)
- The eponymous Cluster & Eno

A second volume, Begegnungen II, was also released.

Begegnungen was issued on CD in the US in 1996 by the Gyroscope label . It was also reissued on Pat Thomas's San Francisco–based Water label in 2006.

== Tracks ==
1. "Johanneslust" (Roedelius) – 4:58 (from Durch die Wüste)
2. "Two Oldtimers" (Moebius & Plank) – 6:58 (from Rastakraut Pasta)
3. "The Belldog" (Eno-Moebius-Roedelius) – 6:14 (from After the Heat)
4. "Nervös" (Dieter Moebius) – 3:26 (from Tonspuren)
5. "Pitch Control" (Moebius-Plank-Neumeier) – 6:21 (from Zero Set)
6. "Dem Wanderer" (Cluster) – 3:52 (from Sowiesoso)
7. "Schöne Hände" (Cluster & Eno) – 3:02 (from Cluster & Eno)
