= Begegnungen II =

Compilation album by Eno Moebius Roedelius Plank
- Released: 1985
- Recorded: 1976–1983
- Genre: Ambient; Electronic music Kosmische Musik
- Length: 41:21
- Label: Sky Records

Professional ratings
Review scores
Source	Rating
AllMusic	4/5 stars
Pitchfork Media	(7.8/10)

Begegnungen II is a Sky Records 1985 compilation album (second volume to Begegnungen) with recordings by Brian Eno, Dieter Moebius, Hans-Joachim Roedelius, Conny Plank, Cluster, from solo albums, and from various collaborations between the artists. All of the tracks had been previously released elsewhere. The albums these tracks were drawn from are: Material by Moebius & Plank, Zero Set by Moebius, Plank, Neumeier, Durch die Wüste and Lustwandel, both Roedelius solo albums, After The Heat by Eno, Moebius, Roedelius, Tonspuren, the first solo album by Moebius, Sowiesoso by Cluster, and the eponymous Cluster & Eno. These albums were released by Sky between 1976 and 1983.

The title is the German word for "Meetings" or "Encounters".

Begegnungen II was issued in the US on CD in 1996 by the Gyroscope label. It was also reissued on the San Francisco–based Water label in 2006.

== Track listing ==
1. "Conditionierer" (Moebius & Plank) – 4:50
2. "Speed Display" (Moebius-Plank-Neumeier) – 5:14
3. "Mr. Livingstone" (Roedelius) – 5:41
4. "Broken Head" (Eno-Moebius-Roedelius) – 5:22
5. "Langer Atem" (Roedelius) – 7:14
6. "Hasenheide" (Dieter Moebius) – 2:39
7. "Es War Einmal" (Cluster) – 5:20
8. "Für Luise" (Cluster & Eno) – 5:01

== Personnel ==
- Brian Eno
- Hans-Joachim Roedelius
- Dieter Moebius
- Conny Plank
- Mani Neumeier – drums
