= Conny Plank =

German record producer and musician (1940–1987)

- Plank at the Windrose studio in Hamburg

Background information
- Born: Konrad Plank; 3 May 1940; Hütschenhausen, Germany
- Died: 5 December 1987 (aged 47) Cologne, West Germany
- Genres: Krautrock; kosmische musik; experimental rock; new wave; electronic; ambient
- Occupations: Record producer, musician
- Instruments: Synthesizer; keyboards; guitar; percussion
- Years active: 1969–1987
- Labels: Sky; Drag City; Curious Music; Brain

Konrad "Conny" Plank (3 May 1940 – 5 December 1987) was a German record producer and musician. He is known for his innovative work as a sound engineer and producer in Germany's krautrock and kosmische music scene in the 1970s. Plank was involved in releases by Neu!, Kraftwerk, Cluster, Harmonia, Ash Ra Tempel, Guru Guru, Kraan, and other German groups of the era. He later produced for new wave acts such as D.A.F., Eurythmics, Ultravox, Killing Joke, and Play Dead. He was influential to producer Martin Hannett.

As a billed performer, Plank also formed the group Moebius & Plank, releasing 5 albums between 1979 and 1986.

== Career ==
=== 1960s ===
In mid-to-late 60s, Conny attended new-music courses at the Rheinische Musikschule in Cologne, taught by Karlheinz Stockhausen, Luciano Berio, Henri Pousseur, and Earle Brown.

In the late 1960s, Plank began producing albums and working as a sound engineer, and became involved in the underground music scene, which was spreading from Berlin throughout Germany. In 1969 he served as engineer for the first Kluster album, Klopfzeichen, which was released the following year. His long association with Dieter Moebius and Hans-Joachim Roedelius of Kluster and later Cluster endured until his death. He also served as engineer for Alexander von Schlippenbach's album The Living Music, which was released in 1969, the first of a long list of engineering and production credits.

=== 1970s ===
In 1970 he had a 56 channel mixing desk hand built by himself, Peter Lang and Michael Zähl. and went on to produce and/or engineered many recordings by significant German progressive/experimental music acts often referred to as krautrock internationally, including Kraftwerk, Organisation, Neu!, Cluster, Harmonia, Night Sun, Holger Czukay and Guru Guru.

In 1977, through Brian Eno, Plank recruited Dave Hutchins from Island Studios, as house engineer. Hutchins undertook recording and mixing roles on many of the productions originating from the studios in the following ten years.

As a musician, Plank played guitar and keyboards on three Guru Guru albums: Kang Guru, Guru Guru, and Mani und Seine Freunde, the Os Mundi album 43 Minuten, and Cluster's self-titled debut album. In 1978 and 1979 he added guitar and percussion to two Roedelius solo albums, Durch Die Wüste and Selbstportrait. He was a member of the short lived band Liliental, contributing guitar, keyboards, and vocals. In 1979 he went into the studio with Dieter Moebius to record the first Moebius & Plank album, Rastakraut Pasta which was released the following year.

=== 1980s ===
Plank continued to work as one half of the duo Moebius & Plank, recording four additional albums. Their second album, Material, was released in 1981. Their third album, the African-influenced Zero Set, with Guru Guru drummer Mani Neumeier, was released in 1983. These two albums are early examples of the predecessors of techno and electronica. In 1983, Moebius & Plank also recorded the album Ludwig's Law using an E-mu Emulator, an early form of sampling keyboard that enabled them to duplicate other instruments without having musicians to play them. Mayo Thompson of Red Krayola contributed vocals, mainly spoken monologues. The project was rejected by Sky Records and was not released until 1998. The final Moebius & Plank collaboration, En Route was recorded in Conny's Studio in 1986 but left incomplete as Plank's health deteriorated. It was completed and mixed in 1995, primarily by Dieter Moebius, and released that year.

During the eighties, Plank remained in high demand with the new generation of electronic pop and new wave artists, including Devo, the Meteors from the Netherlands (Hunger in 1980 and Stormy Seas in 1981), Hunters & Collectors from Australia ( The Fireman's Curse in 1983 and The Jaws of Life in 1984) the Fred Banana Combo, Ultravox (Systems of Romance, Vienna and Rage in Eden), Echo & the Bunnymen, Freur, Killing Joke, the Tourists (Luminous Basement) and Eurythmics (In the Garden). He also worked on pop and rock productions with artists such as Scorpions, Clannad, Play Dead, and Gianna Nannini (Latin Lover, Sogno Di Una Notte d'Estate, Tutto Live and others, also credited for music).

Plank's other production credits include Liaisons Dangereuses, Phew, Einstürzende Neubauten, Ástor Piazzolla, Psychotic Tanks, DAF (including the classic single "Der Mussolini"), Les Rita Mitsouko, and Nina Hagen.

According to René Tinner and Stephan Plank in a radio documentary about the life of Conny Plank, it was Brian Eno's idea that Plank should produce the U2 album The Joshua Tree instead of him. After being introduced to the band by Eno and after a short meeting, Plank turned down the job ("I cannot work with this singer"). According to the companion website of the documentary film Conny Plank – The Potential of Noise (but not the film itself), after the meeting, Plank firstly asked for time for a second thought. In the meantime he attended a U2 concert at Freilichtbühne Loreley, where U2's Bono introduced Plank to the audience as their new producer, after which Plank is said to have left the concert and never communicated further with any member of U2.

== Death ==
Plank became sick while touring South America with Dieter Moebius, Arno Steffen and Detlef Wiederhoeft performing music from Ludwig's Law. Some of Plank's last work, before his death in 1987 from laryngeal cancer in Cologne, was the recording of concerts on Eurythmics' Revenge tour, and samples used on the NED Synclavier on their Savage album.

Plank's studio established at his home on the southern outskirts of Cologne continued to be run by his widow Christa Fast and their son until her failing health and the general change in the music business forced them to offer its contents for sale in May 2006. Fast died on 1 June 2006. Conny's hand-built mixing desk was bought by English producers David M. Allen and Mark Ralph and transported to England. The desk was originally designed and built by Plank in 1970, altered and frequently upgraded until his death in 1987. The 56 channel desk was a custom design and has a number of unique features, including a specially designed equalization (EQ) section that conformed to Plank's own preferred EQ settings, as well as a section that could be removed and fitted into a converted military van adapted for remote recording. It is also reputedly laminated in wood taken from a single cherry tree from Plank's own garden.

The mixing desk was initially installed at Club Ralf, the private studio of producer Mark Ralph, where he used it to record and mix a range of work including all or parts of "In Our Heads" and "Why Make Sense" by Hot Chip, "Right Thoughts, Right Words, Right Action" by Franz Ferdinand and "Communion" by Years & Years. It is currently in North London at Studio 7, the private studio of songwriter and producer Laurence Loveless.

== Style and influence ==
Plank drew inspiration from British and American rock music, specifically the work of Rolling Stones, Jimi Hendrix, and Velvet Underground, but deemed pointless an effort to imitate them and "set about devising ways of giving groups [he produced] a discernibly European identity and sound. He praised the work of the Jamaican producer Lee "Scratch" Perry, admiring its simplicity and minimal technology usage. Plank used multi-track recording facilities. He favored sometimes harsh-sounding effects and contrasting audio for each element in the mix. Plank used combinations of echo, reverberation and other electronic, mixing, editing and tape-based effects to create mixes. Plank favoured a 'live' production sound, especially on drums. On a recording session in Hamburg in 1970 with Hartmut Kulka from the German Blue Flames & Philip Cantlay of Casey Jones & the Governors/Gaslight Union, together known as Kulka & Cantlay, he set up and recorded conga drums with specially inserted microphones to provide an unusual percussion sound.

Plank, who began his career as soundman for Marlene Dietrich, was an ardent believer in the possibilities of electronic music and electronic soundscapes. He was also known for blending them with conventional sounds, or natural sounds given unconventional treatments, such as using large metal containers and other industrial objects as percussion instruments.

Plank and the bands he worked with in West Germany had a strong influence on mainstream rock artists, some of whom were able to popularize aspects of his production technique and his distinctive approach. In the 1980s, electronic pop bands were able to realize his ideas in performance as computerized electronic instruments became readily available.

== Recordings ==
Plank was involved with the following chronological list of albums, either as a direct contributor or because his studio facilities were used. The dates refer to the year of first release.

1969

- The Living Music (Alexander von Schlippenbach)
- Tone Float (Organisation)

1970

- Just A Poke (Sweet Smoke)
- Klopfzeichen (Kluster)
- Kraftwerk (Kraftwerk)

1971

- Zwei-Osterei (Kluster)
- Ash Ra Tempel (Ash Ra Tempel)
- Legend (Parzival)
- Eloy (Eloy)
- Cluster (Cluster)

1972

- "BaRock" (Parzival)
- Mournin' (Night Sun)
- 43 Minuten (Os Mundi)
- Kraftwerk 2 (Kraftwerk)
- Neu! (Neu!)
- Cluster II (Cluster)
- Echo (A.R. & Machines)
- Lonesome Crow (Scorpions)
- Kan Guru (Guru Guru)
- Together (Jane)
- I Turned to See Whose Voice it Was (Gomorrha)
- Kollektiv (Kollektiv)
- Supernova (Ibliss)

1973

- Guru Guru (Guru Guru)
- Neu! 2 (Neu!)
- Ralf und Florian (Kraftwerk)

1974

- Autobahn (Kraftwerk)
- Zuckerzeit (Cluster)
- Andy Nogger (Kraan)
- Free Improvisation (Wired)

1975

- Deluxe (Harmonia)
- Neu! '75 (Neu!)
- La Leyla (Ramses)
- Hoelderlin (Hoelderlin)
- Let It Out (Kraan)
- Bröselmaschine (Bröselmaschine)
- Mani und Seine Freunde (Guru Guru)

1976

- Sowiesoso (Cluster)
- Selected Jigs Reels & Songs (De Danann)
- Clowns & Clouds (Hoelderlin)
- You Won't See Me (Helmut Koellen)
- La Düsseldorf (La Düsseldorf)

1977

- Before and after Science (Brian Eno)
- Cluster & Eno (Cluster and Brian Eno)
- Flammende Herzen (Michael Rother)
- Pompeii (Triumvirat)
- Rockpommel's Land (Grobschnitt)

1978

- After the Heat (Eno, Moebius, Roedelius)
- Ambient 1: Music for Airports (Brian Eno)
- Flyday (Kraan)
- Durch die Wüste (Roedelius)
- Question: Are We Not Men? Answer: We Are Devo! (Devo)
- Out of Reach (Can)
- Liliental (Liliental)
- Sterntaler (Michael Rother)
- Systems of Romance (Ultravox)
- Welcome (SBB)

1979

- Katzenmusik (Michael Rother)
- Selbstportrait (Roedelius)

1980

- Crann Ull (Clannad)
- Rastakraut Pasta (Moebius & Plank)
- Die Kleinen und die Bösen (DAF)
- Three into One (Ultravox)
- Hunger (The Meteors)
- Tournee (Kraan)
- Vienna (Ultravox)
- Luminous Basement (The Tourists)

1981

- Material (Moebius & Plank)
- Phew (Phew, with Holger Czukay, Conny Plank & Jaki Liebezeit)
- Alles ist gut (DAF)
- Gold und Liebe (DAF)
- Les Vampyrettes (Conny Plank and Holger Czukay)
- Stormy Seas (The Meteors) Dutch band
- In the Garden (Eurythmics)
- Rage in Eden (Ultravox)
- Der Ernst des Lebens (Ideal)
- Edelweiß (Joachim Witt)

1982

- Revelations (Killing Joke)
- Latin Lover (Gianna Nannini)
- Strange Music (Moebius & Beerbohm)
- Für Immer (DAF)

1983

- Zero Set (Moebius, Plank, and Neumeier)
- The Fireman's Curse (Hunters & Collectors)
- Listen (A Flock of Seagulls)
- Schlagende Wetter (Kowalski)
- Whodini (album)

1984

- Der Osten ist Rot (Holger Czukay)
- Belfegore (Belfegore)
- Begegnungen (Eno Moebius Roedelius Plank)
- Rita Mitsouko (Les Rita Mitsouko)
- The Collection (Ultravox)
- Puzzle (Gianna Nannini)
- Should Have Been Greatest Hits (The Tourists)
- The Jaws of Life (Hunters & Collectors)

1985

- Humpe Humpe (album) (Humpe Humpe)
- Begegnungen II (Eno Moebius Roedelius Plank)
- Tutto Live (Gianna Nannini)
- Old Land (Cluster and Brian Eno)
- Dein ist mein ganzes Herz (Heinz Rudolf Kunze)
- Company of Justice (Play Dead)

1986

- U-Vox (Ultravox)
- Profumo (Gianna Nannini)

1987

- The Prophecies of Nostradamus (Bollock Brothers)
- Rome Remains Rome (Holger Czukay)
- Savage (Eurythmics)
- Mein Schatz (Heiner Pudelko) = his final production; finished by Annette Humpe

Posthumous

- Laugh? I Nearly Bought One! (Killing Joke, 1992)
- Box II (Brian Eno, 1993)
- If I Was: The Very Best of Midge Ure & Ultravox (Midge Ure and Ultravox, 1993)
- Rare, Vol. I (Ultravox, 1993)
- Rare, Vol. II (Ultravox, 1994)
- En Route (Moebius & Plank, recorded 1986, released 1995)
- Space Ship (The Best Of, Part 1) (Guru Guru, 1996)
- The Best of Ax Genrich (Ax Genrich, 1997)
- Greatest Hits (The Tourists, 1997)
- Guru Guru & Uli Trepte (Guru Guru and Uli Trepte, 1997)
- The Michael Schenker Story Live (Michael Schenker, 1997)
- Chronicles, Vol. 1 (Michael Rother, 1998)
- Ludwig's Law (Moebius, Plank, Thompson, recorded 1983, released 1998)
- Music For Two Brothers (Rolf & Joachim Kuhn, 1998)
- Best (Scorpions, 1999)
- The Very Best of Guru Guru (Guru Guru, 1999)
- La Luna (Holger Czukay 2000, expanded 2007)
- Into The Arena 1972–1995 [Highlights and Overtures] (Michael Schenker, 2000)
- Pioneers Who Got Scalped (Devo, 2000)
- More Nipples (Peter Brötzmann Group, 2003)

== Documentary ==
- Conny Plank – The Potential of Noise, a 92 minute documentary film directed by Reto Caduff and Plank's son Stephan Plank, was released in September 2017.
