= Moebius & Plank =

German electronic music duo

- Origin: Berlin, Germany
- Genres: Krautrock, electronic, experimental, new age, electronica, techno
- Years active: 1979–1986
- Spinoff of: Cluster
- Past members: Dieter Moebius; Conny Plank

Moebius & Plank was a German electronic music duo consisting of musicians Dieter Moebius (also of the act Cluster) and Conny Plank. They recorded three albums between 1979 and 1986 as well as two additional albums, one a collaboration with Mani Neumeier and the other with Mayo Thompson. Plank died of cancer in 1987. Their final two albums were released posthumously in 1995 and 1998 respectively

== Musical style ==
The first Moebius & Plank album Rastakraut Pasta was offbeat electronic music. Beginning with their second album, Material most of their music was highly rhythmic with a driving beat, with just some of it suitable for dance music. Like Kraftwerk their sound would be imitated by techno and electronica bands which followed but their music was far less pop and they were willing to push the artistic envelope. The third album, Zero Set, which added Guru Guru drummer Mani Neumeier, was heavily influenced by African music.

== History ==
=== 1969–1979 Kluster and Cluster ===
From 1969 until 1971 Moebius was a member of the pioneering experimental Krautrock band Kluster based in Berlin, together with Conrad Schnitzler and Hans-Joachim Roedelius. Konrad (Conny) Plank first worked with Moebius during the Kluster years, serving as engineer for their first two albums Klopfzeichen and Zwei-Osterei. When Schnitzler left Kluster the trio of Moebius, Roedelius, and Plank became Cluster. Plank is only credited with playing on the first album, Cluster (later reissued as Cluster '71), but he is listed as a composer of the music on Cluster II and continued to produce Cluster albums until 1978, including their two collaborations with Brian Eno. In September, 1979 Moebius & Plank went to Conny's Studio to record their first album, Rastakraut Pasta.

=== 1980–1986 Moebius & Plank Recordings ===
Rastakraut Pasta was released in 1980 on the Hamburg-based Sky Records label. It featured offbeat and experimental electronic music, at times influenced by reggae as the album title suggests. All instruments and vocals are credited to Moebius & Plank except for bass on three tracks which was played by Can alumnus Holger Czukay. The second album, Material, was released by Sky in 1981 and featured driving electronic rhythms on most of the tracks. Steven and Alan Freeman, writing in The Crack in the Cosmic Egg describe the first two albums, in part, this way: "Their early albums as a duo were revelations of innovation, bringing unlikely combinations of industrial rock, cosmic and even dub music (on Rastakraut Pasta) together in a hybrid of genres. A reborn spirit of Krautrock that played recklessly with offbeat forms..." The incessant, forceful beat on "Conditionierer", the opening track of Material, could easily have been suitable for club dance music if not for all the odd electronic sounds added on top.

In September, 1982, Moebius & Plank went back into the studio, this time joined by Guru Guru drummer Mani Neumeier. Plank had played guitar and keyboards on three Guru Guru albums and Neumeier had previously worked with Moebius on the Harmonia album Deluxe. The resulting album Zero Set was released on Sky in 1983 and was strongly influenced by African rhythms. Matthew Weiner describes it for Soulmind Online: "Though not a dance record per se, Zero Set is one of the earliest extensions of Krautrock’s possibilities on the dance floor, pitting the profoundly electronic sequence patterns of Plank and Moebius against the hyperactive percussives of Guru Guru drummer Mani Neumeier. On tracks such as the prophetically titled 'Speed Display' and 'Pitch Control', the phasing, chattering and decidedly Germanic grooves found on Zero Set constitute vibrant proto-techno at its earliest and finest."

Moebius & Plank would return to the studio twice more in the mid 1980s but their efforts would not be released until well after Conny Plank succumbed to cancer in 1987. In 1983 Moebius & Plank recorded a series of electronic tracks using an Emulator, an early form of sampling keyboard that enabled them to duplicate other instruments without having to deal with the musicians who played them. Mayo Thompson of Red Krayola recorded a series of monologues and vocal tracks which were added to the music Moebius & Plank had recorded. Sky Records rejected the master and Ludwig's Law was regulated to the vault. It was finally released on 16 November 1998 on the Drag City label.

Despite the rejection of Ludwig's Law by Sky, Moebius & Plank did decide to tour and perform the music, albeit without Mayo Thompson. Conny Plank fell ill while touring in South America.

The final studio effort for Moebius & Plank was En Route, recorded at Conny's Studio in 1986. As Plank's health deteriorated the recordings were left incomplete. The album was completed and mixed by Moebius & Gebhard and released with three remixes by Manu Guiot added on the Dubuque, Iowa-based Curious Music label in 1995.

== Discography ==
- 1980 : Rastakraut Pasta (studio album)
- 1981 : Material (studio album)
- 1995 : En Route (studio album)

Collaborations

- 1983 : Zero Set (studio album with Mani Neumeier)
- 1998 : Ludwig's Law (studio album with Mayo Thompson)

Compilations

- 1984 : Begegnungen (compilation album with Brian Eno and Hans-Joachim Roedelius)
- 1985 : Begegnungen II (compilation album with Brian Eno and Hans-Joachim Roedelius)
