= Before and After Science =

Studio album by Brian Eno
- Released: December 1977
- Studios: Basing Street, London; Conny's Studio, Cologne
- Genres: Art rock; art pop; avant-pop; experimental pop
- Length: 39:30
- Labels: Island, Polydor
- Producers: Brian Eno, Rhett Davies

Brian Eno chronology
Cluster & Eno (1977)	Before and After Science (1977)	After the Heat (1978)

Singles from Before and After Science
- 1. "King's Lead Hat" Released: January 1978

Before and After Science is the fifth solo studio album by the English musician Brian Eno, originally released by Polydor Records in December 1977 in the UK and by Island in the US soon after. It was produced by Eno and Rhett Davies.

Several musicians from the UK and Germany collaborated on the album, including Robert Wyatt, Fred Frith, Phil Collins, Phil Manzanera, Paul Rudolph, Andy Fraser, Dave Mattacks, Jaki Liebezeit, Dieter Moebius, and Hans-Joachim Roedelius. Over one hundred tracks were written, but only ten were included. The musical styles range from energetic and jagged to languid and pastoral.

The album marks Eno's last foray into rock music as a solo artist in the 1970s. Most of his following work instead showcases avant-garde and ambient music, which was hinted at predominantly on the second side of Before and After Science. It was Eno's second to chart in the US. The song "King's Lead Hat" (the title of which is an anagram for Talking Heads, for whom Eno later produced three albums) was remixed and released as a single, although it did not chart in the UK. Critical response to the album has remained positive, with several critics calling it one of Eno's best works.

== Production ==
Unlike Eno's previous albums, which were recorded in a very short time, Before and After Science was two years in the making. During this two-year period, Eno was busy working on his solo ambient music albums Music for Films and Discreet Music and collaborating with David Bowie on the latter's albums Low and "Heroes". Due to the very positive critical reception accorded his previous rock music-oriented album, Another Green World, Eno was afraid of repeating himself but still wanted to release a high-quality product.

As on his previous rock-based recordings, Eno worked with a plethora of guest musicians. Several artists from German and British groups of the era contributed to the album, collaborating with Eno for the first time. Guitarist Fred Frith of Henry Cow caught Eno's attention with "the timbral possibilities that [Frith had] been discovering" on his solo guitar album Guitar Solos. Jaki Liebezeit of the German krautrock group Can played drums on "Backwater", and German ambient duo Cluster co-wrote and performed on "By This River". Eno had previously worked with Cluster on their album Cluster & Eno, released in 1977. Other musicians included Dave Mattacks, who played drums on "Kurt's Rejoinder" and "Here He Comes", and Andy Fraser (bass guitarist in British blues rock band Free) who played the drums on "King's Lead Hat".

Several musicians who had worked with Eno on previous albums returned. Percy Jones of Brand X and Phil Collins of Brand X and Genesis played bass and drums respectively, as they had on Another Green World. Other returning contributors included Robert Fripp, Paul Rudolph, Bill MacCormick and Eno's former Roxy Music bandmate Phil Manzanera. "Shirley Williams" is credited on the album sleeve for "time" and "brush timbales" on "Through Hollow Lands" and "Kurt's Rejoinder"; Williams was a pseudonym for Robert Wyatt. Working extensively with the musicians and his instructional cards—the Oblique Strategies—during the two years working on the album, Eno wrote over one hundred songs.

== Music and lyrics ==
Jim DeRogatis, author of Turn on Your Mind: Four Decades of Great Psychedelic Rock, described the overall sound of Before and After Science as "the coldest and most clinical of Eno's pop efforts". David Ross Smith of online music database AllMusic wrote that "Despite the album's pop format, the sound is unique and strays far from the mainstream". According to David Bowie biographer Thomas Jerome Seabrook, the album is "split between up-tempo art-rock on side one and more pastoral material on side two", while Piotr Orlov of LA Weekly categorized it as an art pop record. The album's opening tracks "No One Receiving" and "Backwater" start the album as upbeat and bouncy songs. "King's Lead Hat" is an anagram of Talking Heads, a new wave group Eno had met after a concert in England when they were touring with the Ramones. Eno would later produce Talking Heads' second, third and fourth albums, including Remain in Light. The last five songs of the album have been described as having "an occasional pastoral quality" and being "pensive and atmospheric".

Eno referred to the music of Before and After Science as "ocean music", as opposed to Another Green World, which he described as "sky music". References to water in the lyrics appear in songs such as "Backwater", "Julie With..." and "By This River". Author Simon Reynolds noted themes of "boredom" and "bliss" through the album, citing "Here He Comes", about "a boy trying to vanish by floating through the sky through a different time" and "Spider and I", about a boy watching the sky and dreaming about being carried away with a ship, as examples. Eno's songwriting style was described as "a sound-over-sense approach". Influenced by German artist and poet Kurt Schwitters, Eno consciously did not make songwriting or lyrics the main focus in the music. Tom Carson of Rolling Stone noted this style, stating that the lyrics are "only complementary variables" to the music on the album. Lester Bangs commented on Eno's lyrical style on "Julie with..." stating that the lyrics' themes "could be a murderer's ruminations, or simply a lovers' retreat... or Julie could be three years old". Schwitters' influence is also shown on the song "Kurt's Rejoinder", on which samples of Schwitters' poem "Ursonate" can be heard.

== Release ==
Peter Schmidt's "Four Years" was one of four prints included in the original pressings of the album

Before and After Science was released in December 1977 on Polydor in the United Kingdom and on Island in the United States. The first pressings included four offset prints by Peter Schmidt. The back cover states "Fourteen Pictures" under the album title, referencing Eno's ten songs and Peter Schmidt's 4 prints. These prints included "The Road to the Crater", "Look at September, look at October", "The Other House" and "Four Years". The album did not chart in the United Kingdom, but was Eno's first album since Here Come the Warm Jets to chart in the United States, where it peaked at 171 on the Billboard Top LPs & Tape chart. "King's Lead Hat" was remixed and released as a single in January 1978, featuring the B-side "R.A.F.", which is credited to "Eno & Snatch" (in the UK, not the US). This single failed to chart and has never been reissued in any form.

The album was re-issued on CD through E.G. Records in January 1987. In 2004, Virgin Records began reissuing Eno's albums in batches of four to five. The remastered digipak release of Before and After Science was released on 31 May 2004 in the United Kingdom and on 1 June 2004 in North America.

== Critical reception ==
Professional ratings
Review scores
Source	Rating
AllMusic	5/5 stars
Blender	5/5 stars
Christgau's Record Guide	A−
Entertainment Weekly	A
Mojo	4/5 stars
The New Zealand Herald	5/5 stars
Pitchfork	10/10 (2017)
The Rolling Stone Album Guide	5/5 stars
Spin Alternative Record Guide	9/10
Uncut	8/10

The album was acclaimed. Writing for Creem, Joe Fernbacher called Before and After Science "the perfect Eno album", and Mitchell Schneider in Crawdaddy said he could not "remember the last time a record took such a hold of [him]—and gave [him] such an extreme case of vertigo, too". In DownBeat, Russell Shaw wrote that it was "another typically awesome, stunning and numbing Brian Eno album—the record Pink Floyd could make if they set their collective mind to it". Tom Carson of Rolling Stone considered it "less immediately ingratiating than either Taking Tiger Mountain or Here Come the Warm Jets. Still, the execution here is close to flawless, and despite Eno's eclecticism, the disparate styles he employs connect brilliantly." Critic Robert Christgau gave the album an A− rating, stating that he "didn't like the murkiness of the quiet, largely instrumental reflections that take over side two", but did not find that this "diminishes side one's oblique, charming tour of the popular rhythms of the day". In 1979, Before and After Science was voted 12th best album of the year on The Village Voice's Pazz & Jop critics' poll for 1978.

Among later reviews of Before and After Science, the editors of AllMusic awarded the album the highest rating of five stars, with David Ross Smith stating that it ranks alongside Here Come the Warm Jets and Another Green World "as the most essential Eno material". The music webzine Tiny Mix Tapes awarded the album their highest rating, stating that it "is not only one of the best albums in Eno's catalog, but of the 1970s as a whole". Douglas Wolk of the webzine Pitchfork gave Before and After Science a perfect rating, calling it "the most conceptually elegant of Eno's '70s song-albums". Pitchfork placed Before and After Science at number 100 on their list of the top albums of the 1970s, referring to it as a "lovely, charming album" and going on to state that, while "not formally groundbreaking, it's frequently overlooked when discussing great albums from an era that's romanticized as placing premiums on progression and innovation—and particularly in the context of Eno's career, which is so full of both".

== Track listing ==
All tracks are written by Brian Eno, except where noted

Side one
No.	Title	Writer(s)	Length
1.	"No One Receiving"		3:52
2.	"Backwater"		3:43
3.	"Kurt's Rejoinder"		2:55
4.	"Energy Fools the Magician"	Eno, arranged by Percy Jones	2:04
5.	"King's Lead Hat"		3:56

Side two
No.	Title	Writer(s)	Length
6.	"Here He Comes"		5:38
7.	"Julie With..."		6:19
8.	"By This River"	Eno, Hans-Joachim Roedelius, Dieter Moebius	3:03
9.	"Through Hollow Lands" (for Harold Budd)	Eno, arranged by Fred Frith	3:56
10.	"Spider and I"		4:10

== Personnel ==
Musicians

- Brian Eno – voices (on all tracks, except 4 and 9), piano (tracks 1, 2, 5–7), synthesizer (1, 3), guitar (1, 7), synthesized percussion (1), rhythm guitar (2, 5), brass (2), chorus (3, 4), 'jazz' piano (3), keyboards (4, 9, 10), vibes (4), metallics (5), Yamaha CS-80 (6–8), Moog synth (6, 9), EMS Synthi AKS (7, 10), Minimoog and bell (7), melody guitar (9)
- Paul Rudolph – bass (1, 2, 5–7), rhythm guitar (1), harmonic bass (7)
- Percy Jones – fretless bass (1, 4), analogue delay bass (3)
- Phil Collins – drums (1, 4)
- Rhett Davies – agong-gong and stick (1)
- Jaki Liebezeit – drums (2)
- Dave Mattacks – drums (3, 6)
- Shirley Williams (Robert Wyatt) – brush timbales (3), time (9)
- Kurt Schwitters – voice sample (from Ursonate) (3)
- Fred Frith – modified guitar (4), cascade guitars (9)
- Phil Manzanera – rhythm guitar (5), guitar (6)
- Robert Fripp – guitar solo (5)
- Andy Fraser – drums (5)
- Achim Roedelius – grand piano and electric piano (8)
- Möbi Moebius – bass Fender piano (8)
- Bill MacCormick – bass (9)
- Brian Turrington – bass (10)

Production

- Brian Eno – producer, cover design
- Rhett Davies – producer, audio engineer
- Conny Plank – engineer
- Dave Hutchins – engineer
- Cream – cover artwork
- Ritva Saarikko – cover photograph
- Peter Schmidt – art prints

== Chart positions ==
Chart (1978)	Peak position
Australian Albums (Kent Music Report)	45
New Zealand Albums Chart	18
Swedish Albums Chart	25
US Billboard 200	171
