= Trepte =

Trepte is a surname. Notable people with the surname include:

- Ludwig Trepte (born 1988), German actor
- Uli Trepte (1941–2009), German musician
