= Cluster II =

Cluster II may refer to:

- Cluster II (spacecraft), a European Space Agency mission
- Cluster II (album), an album by German electronic music group Cluster
