= From the Promised Land =

Studio album by Play Dead
- Released: May 1984
- Recorded: March 1984
- Genre: Gothic rock, Post-punk, Alternative rock
- Length: 37:42
- Label: Clay
- Producer: John Fryer and Play Dead

Play Dead chronology
The First Flower (1983)	From the Promised Land (1984)	Company of Justice (1985)

From the Promised Land is a 1984 album by Play Dead, and the original version of the band's Resurrection (1992). Only 1000 copies of the original LP were pressed before it was withdrawn, remixed and re-released, because the band members decided they were dissatisfied with the album.

When this album was originally released, the same people who gave negative reviews of "The First Flower: A Six Track Album" practically praised this new album when it was released in May 1984. Conny Plank took notice of Play Dead and turned down a contract to produce U2's "The Unforgettable Fire" to produce Play Dead's next album Company of Justice instead.

== Remix ==
When Play Dead released From the Promised Land in early May 1984, the band decided that the sound was too plain and remixed the entire album. Every new version of each song featured more electronics and re-recorded vocals by Rob Hickson. Also, certain drum beats were rearranged, an example being the faster introduction to "Walk Away". The most notable differences in these remixes when compared to the original versions are in "Walk Away" and "Weeping Blood." "Torn on Desire's" remix seems to have a more toned-down guitar. The new versions of "Holy Holy," "No Motive," and "Weeping Blood" are longer than the originals. The new version of the album became the standard version at the time and had a sticker that read "remix" on the front cover.

== 2007 Version ==
"From the Promised Land" was re-released on CD on June 18, 2007 in the UK. This is third edition of the title "From the Promised Land" and the fourth edition of the album: a 1992 CD issue with bonus tracks was titled Resurrection.

== Track listing ==
All lyrics written by Rob Hickson, all music written by Green, Hickson, Smith, Waddleton

=== Original album ===
1. "Isabel" – 4:57
2. "Torn on Desire" – 4:30
3. "Walk Away" – 3:45
4. "Pleasureland" – 5:28
5. "Return to the East" – 4:03
6. "No Motive" – 4:12
7. "Holy Holy" – 3:59
8. "Weeping Blood" – 6:19

=== Remixed version ===
1. "Isabel" – 4:53
2. "Torn on Desire" – 4:30
3. "Walk Away" – 3:43
4. "Pleasureland" – 5:27
5. "Return to the East" – 4:09
6. "No Motive" – 4:25
7. "Holy Holy" – 4:10
8. "Weeping Blood" – 6:31

=== 2007 version ===
1. "Isabel" - 4:51
2. "Torn on Desire" - 4:26
3. "Walk Away" - 3:40
4. "Pleasureland" - 5:25
5. "Return to the East" - 4:05
6. "No Motive" - 4:23
7. "Holy Holy" - 4:06
8. "Weeping Blood" - 6:28
9. "Break" - 3:40
10. "Bloodstains" - 4:05
11. "Solace" - 5:36
12. "Pale Fire" - 3:53
13. "Sacrosanct" - 3:40
14. "Conspiracy" - 4:30
15. "Bloodstains Pleasure" - 5:11
16. "Solace (extended version)" - 5:37
17. "Holy Holy (catholic mix)" - 6:12

== Personnel ==
- Rob Hickson - vocals
- Pete Waddleton - bass
- Steve Green (play dead) - guitar
- Mark "Wiff" Smith - drums
