= The Meteors (disambiguation) =

The Meteors are a British psychobilly band

The Meteors may also refer to:

- The Meteors (Dutch band)
- Meteor Music Awards
- The New Zealand band led by Max Merritt
