= Sweet Smoke Live =

Live album by Sweet Smoke
- Released: 1974
- Recorded: live in Berlin, Musikhochschule, for the Benefit of Ananda Marga Yoga Society
- Genre: Progressive rock
- Length: 37:17
- Label: Harvest
- Producer: John Möring

Sweet Smoke chronology
Darkness to Light (1973)	Sweet Smoke Live (1974)

Alternative covers
- 1997 CD re-issue cover

Alternative cover
- Cover of the 2001 CD re-release with bonus tracks

Sweet Smoke Live is the third release from the progressive jazz rock band Sweet Smoke. Released in 1974, it was their second record to feature only two tracks, the first being their debut effort Just a Poke. It showcases the band's live talents with extended jamming, the guitar solos are the showcase. It was recorded live in Berlin, Musikhochschule. The last track is actually two songs that were combined during the LP engineering. The tracks were later listed separately when three additional tracks were added to the 2001 CD re-release. After the 1997 CD re-issue had already used a different cover than the original LP, the cover for the 2001 re-release was changed again, re-using the typographical design of the LP cover.

== Track listing ==
=== Side one ===
1. "First Jam" (Sweet Smoke) – 19:15

=== Side two ===
1. "Shadout Mapes" (Rick Greenberg)
  "Ocean of Fears" (Marvin Kaminowitz) – 18:02

==== 2001 CD re-release with bonus tracks ====
1. "First Jam"
2. "Shadout Mapes"
3. "Ocean of Fears"
4. "People Are Hard"
5. "Schyler's Song"
6. "Final Jam"

== Personnel ==
- Marvin Kaminowitz – lead guitar, vocals, percussion
- Rick Greenberg (aka, Rick Rasa) – rhythm guitar, sitar
- John Classi – percussion, sound effects
- Andrew Dershin – bass guitar, percussion
- Jay Dorfman – drums, percussion
- Martin Rosenberg – tambura, percussion
