= Werner Pöhlert =

German musician (1928–2000)

Werner Pöhlert (September 30, 1928, to September 30, 2000) was jazz guitarist and author born in Hamburg, Germany. He was voted best German jazz guitarist in 1956. At that time, he was a member of the Wolfgang Lauth Quartet. He also collaborated with Hans Reffert and was a guitarist in the Werner Pöhlert Combo, along with his son Jochen Pöhlert. Pöhlert worked as a university lecturer.

== Written works ==
- Basic Harmony, 1983, ISBN 3921729300
- Der Dauerquintfall: seine Erklärung durch die Quintfall-Drehscheibe auf Basis der Grundlagenharmonik. Grundlagen zur Improvisation und Komposition, zum Begleiten und Liedermachen (mit Jochen Schulte), 1984, ISBN 392172922X
- Schule für authentisches Jazz-Piano & Keyboard. Moderne Grundlagentechniken auf Basis der Pöhlertschen Grundlagenharmonik, 1991, ISBN 3877420591
- Analyse der Skalen"theorie" auf Basis der Pöhlertschen Grundlagenharmonik, Zimmermann, ISBN 392172936X
- Pöhlert's Gitarre Pages, Zimmermann, 1994, ISBN 3877420915
- Pöhlert's Baß Pages, Schimper, 1995, ISBN 3877420931
- Pöhlert's Piano & Keyboard Pages, Schimper, 1996, ISBN 3877421040
- Basic Mediantic., Blues Mediantic, Schimper, ISBN 3877420672
- Grundlagenharmonik und grundlagenharmonisches Denken, Zimmermann, ISBN 3877421601
