= Night Sun =

German hard rock/heavy metal band

- Origin: Mannheim, Heidelberg, Germany
- Genres: Heavy metal; hard rock; progressive rock
- Years active: 1970–1973
- Labels: Polydor/Zebra 1972; Second Battle 1997
- Members: Bruno Schaab; Walter Kirchgessner; Knut Rossler; Ulrich Staudt

Night Sun were a German hard rock/heavy metal band consisting of Bruno Schaab (vocals, bass), Walter Kirchgessner (guitar), Knut Rossler (organ, saxophon) and Ulrich Staudt (drums).

Their one and only LP, Mournin', was released in 1972 on Polydor's Zebra label. Kirchgessner's compositions and way of guitar playing reminds of Deep Purple's Ritchie Blackmore, and Schaab's vocals recalled the screams of Robert Plant from Led Zeppelin. The group played an early form of metal and hard rock, characterized by a "heavy progressive" instrumentation of lead guitar, organ, bass and drums. The album was produced by Konrad Plank (whose production credits include Kraftwerk's early output and Ash Ra Tempel) at the Windrose Studio, Hamburg.

With their sudden shifts of rhythm structures, guitar-with-organ riffing style and some studio effects, particularly phasing, Night Sun never went too close to the ordinary boogie and rock'n'roll trap.

Their sound consisted of many elements, all of which will be of interest to fans of Thrash, Stoner, Doom, Power and Prog Metal, and their 1970s roots.

== History ==
Night Sun's origins lay in the late 1960s jazz band Take Five who were popular in the Rhine Neckar Area of Germany.

Night Sun Mournin' soon shortened their name to just Night Sun, during which time they went through various line-up changes until their 1972 recording of the Mournin' LP.

Night Sun had only moderate local success and after the leaving of Kirchgessner in 1972, the band split up in 1973.

After the demise of the group, Bruno Schaab briefly joined Guru Guru, where his contribution was notable on the track, "The Story Of Life".

Walter Kirchgessner later switched over to playing classical music (cello) in different symphony orchestras and string quartets.

== Discography ==
They released only one LP.

- 1972 - Mournin' - Label: Zebra 2949 004

Songs / Tracks Listing

1. Plastic Shotgun (2:34)

2. Crazy Woman (4:22)

3. Got A Bone Of My Own (7:45)

4. Slush Pan Man (4:25)

5. Living With The Dying (5:31)

6. Come Down (5:48)

7. Blind (4:24)

8. Nightmare (3:16)

9. Don't Start Flying (3:07)

Total Time: 41:12

The LP was re-issued on CD digipak in 1997 by Second Battle SB 041
