= Eloy (album) =

Studio album by Eloy
- Released: July 1971
- Recorded: April 1971
- Studio: Star-Musik-Studios, Hamburg, Germany
- Genre: Progressive rock; krautrock
- Length: 40:58
- Label: Philips
- Producer: Peter M. Freiherr von Lepel

Eloy chronology
Eloy (1971)	Inside (1973)

Unfolded cover
- The front cover unfolded, as if it was an open garbage can.

Audio sample
- "Eloy": file; help

Professional ratings
Review scores
Source	Rating
Allmusic	3/5 stars
Only Solitaire	9/15 stars

Eloy is the debut album by German rock band Eloy, released in 1971.

The album's front cover depicts a garbage can lid, which is printed as an extra flap on the LP cover. When flipped, the bottom of the lid and the inside of the bin are revealed, as if someone opened an actual garbage can.

According to the band's leader Frank Bornemann, members of Eloy had "polarizing positions taken in relation to their artistic direction" at the time, but they "did manage to put an album together which accurately illustrated and reflected the spirit of this epoch". He also thinks that the album represents the band's "embryonic stage".

Allmusic's reviewer Robert Taylor considers the album to be the "humble beginnings for one of progressive rock's most underrated bands".

== Track listing ==
All information according to original vinyl liner notes.

No.	Title	Writer(s)	Length
1.	"Today"	Schriever, Wieczorke, Bornemann	5:56
2.	"Something Yellow"	Schriever, Wieczorke	8:15
3.	"Eloy"	Schriever, Wieczorke, Bornemann, Draht	6:15
4.	"Song Of A Paranoid Soldier"	Schriever, Wieczorke	4:50
5.	"Voice Of Revolution"	Schriever, Wieczorke	3:07
6.	"Isle Of Sun"	Schriever	6:03
7.	"Dillus Roady"	Schriever, Wieczorke, Bornemann	6:32
Total length:			40:58

1997 CD reissue bonus disc
No.	Title	Writer(s)	Length
8.	"Walk Alone" (1970 A-Side single)	Shriever, Wieczorke, Siebrasse	2:43
9.	"Daybreak" (1970 B-Side single)	Shriever, Wieczorke, Siebrasse	2:41
10.	"Interview With Manfred Wieczorke 12.8.1997"		23:09

2008 CD reissue bonus tracks
No.	Title	Writer(s)	Length
8.	"Walk Alone" (1970 A-Side single)	Shriever, Wieczorke, Siebrasse	2:43
9.	"Daybreak" (1970 B-Side single)	Shriever, Wieczorke, Siebrasse	2:41
10.	"Vibrations Of My Mind" (previously unreleased)	Schriever, Wieczorke, Bornemann, Draht, Stöcker	3:36

== Personnel ==
=== Eloy ===
- Erich Schriever: lead vocals, keyboards
- Frank Bornemann: guitar, harmonica, percussion
- Manfred Wieczorke: guitar, backing vocals, bass
- Wolfgang Stöcker: bass
- Helmuth Draht: drums

=== Production ===
- Peter M. Freiherr Von Lepel: production
- Conny Plank: engineering
