= Darkness to Light =

Studio album by Sweet Smoke
- Released: 1973
- Genre: Progressive rock
- Label: EMI Electrola, Harvest
- Producer: John G. Möring

Sweet Smoke chronology
| Just a Poke (1970) | Darkness to Light (1973) | Sweet Smoke Live (1974) |

Darkness to Light is an album released by the band Sweet Smoke in 1973. The album exhibits the use of acoustic guitars, 12 string guitars and flute more than their first album Just A Poke.

== Track listing ==
=== Side one ===
1. "Just an Empty Dream" – 4:20
2. "I'd Rather Burn Than Disappear" – 4:15
3. "Kundalini" – 13:25

=== Side two ===
1. "Believe Me My Friends" – 4:29
2. "Show Me the Way to the War" – 5:30
3. "Darkness to Light" – 12:51

== Personnel ==
- Michael Paris – sax, flute, vocals
- Marvin Kaminowitz – guitar, vocals
- Steve Rosenstein – guitar, vocals
- Rochus Kuhn – violincello
- Jeffrey Dershin – piano, percussion, vocals
- Andrew Dershin – bass
- Jay Dorfman – drums
- Marty Rosenberg – percussion on "Kundalini" and "Believe Me My Friends"
- Puppa Kuhn – flute on "Darkness to Light"
- Peter von de Locht – alto saxophone on "Darkness to Light"

Quote: "Darkness to Light is a very rare record. EMI made a new edition available on CD. It's a very different record than Just a Poke, quite religious, with the arrival of an acoustic guitar which may be responsible of the general sound of the record"
