= Mournin' (album) =

Studio album by Night Sun
- Released: 1972
- Genre: Hard rock, progressive rock, psychedelic rock, heavy metal
- Length: 40:50

Professional ratings
Review scores
Source	Rating
Allmusic	4.5/5 stars

Mournin', the only album by Night Sun, was released in 1972. This album is considered to have many examples of formative heavy metal styles.

== Track listing ==
1. "Plastic Shotgun" - 2:34
2. "Crazy Woman" - 4:18
3. "Got a Bone of My Own" - 7:47
4. "Slush Pan Man" - 4:22
5. "Living with the Dying" - 5:27
6. "Come Down" - 5:46
7. "Blind" - 4:22
8. "Nightmare" - 3:14
9. "Don't Start Flying" - 3:05

1,4,7,8,9 by Kirchgässner & Schaab; 2,5 by Rössler & Schaab; 3 by Plank, Kirchgässner & Schaab; 6 by Rössler, Kirchgässner & Schaab.

== Performance and production credits ==
- Bruno Schaab - Lead Vocals, Bass
- Walter Kirchgassner - Guitar
- Knut Rössler - Organ, Piano (1), Tenor Sax (9)
- Ulrich Staudt - Drums, Percussion
- Konrad Plank - Producer

== Releases ==
- 1972: Label: Zebra 2949 004
- 1997: Label: Second Battle SB 041 (CD Digipak re-issue)
