= King's Lead Hat =

Song performed by Brian Eno

Single by Brian Eno

from the album Before and After Science
- B-side: "R.A.F." (with Snatch)
- Released: December 1977
- Recorded: 1977
- Genre: Rock; new wave
- Length: 3:56
- Label: Polydor
- Songwriter: Brian Eno
- Producer: Brian Eno

Official audio
- "King's Lead Hat" (2004 Digital Remaster) on YouTube

"King's Lead Hat" is a song written by Brian Eno, released in 1977 as the fifth track from his album Before and After Science. The title is an anagram of "Talking Heads". On 27 January 1978, a remixed version of the song was released as a single.

The 2020 40th Anniversary Deluxe Edition of Ultravox's album Vienna includes a live cover version of the song.

Rock critic Lester Bangs described the song "King's Lead Hat" as a track that emphasises "Eno's affinities with new wave in its rushed mechanical rhythms". Eno would later produce Talking Heads' second, third and fourth albums, including Remain in Light (1980). Guitarist Robert Fripp, a frequent collaborator with Eno, performs a solo on the track.

== B-side ==
"R.A.F.", a collaboration with Snatch, is a non-album track that uses samples of Baader-Meinhoff terrorists recorded from a German telephone announcement. R.A.F. stands for "Red Army Faction".

== Personnel ==
Musicians

- Brian Eno – voices, piano, rhythm guitar, metallics
- Paul Rudolph – bass
- Phil Manzanera – rhythm guitar
- Robert Fripp – guitar solo
- Andy Fraser – drums

Production

- Brian Eno – producer
- Rhett Davies – producer, audio engineer
- Conny Plank – engineer

== Cover versions ==
- 1980 – Ultravox, B-side to "Passing Strangers" single
- 2003 – The Dirtbombs, bonus track on early editions of Dangerous Magical Noise
