= Inside (Eloy album) =

Studio album by Eloy
- Released: 10 October 1973
- Recorded: September 1972
- Studio: Studio Windrose, Hamburg, Germany
- Genre: Progressive rock, space rock, krautrock
- Length: 37:47
- Label: Harvest
- Producer: Eloy

Eloy chronology
Eloy (1971)	Inside (1973)	Floating (1974)

Alternative cover
- 2000 remastered CD reissue cover

Audio sample
- "Inside": file; help

Professional ratings
Review scores
Source	Rating
Allmusic	2/5 stars
Only Solitaire	9/15 stars
Progwereld	favorable
The Rocktologist	favorable

Inside is the second studio album by German rock band Eloy, released in 1973.

Since their debut album's release in 1971, vocalist Erich Schriever left the band, and drummer Helmuth Draht was replaced by Fritz Randow. Inside was also bassist's Wolfgang Stöcker last appearance as a professional musician - soon after the album's release he decided to retire from music, in order to achieve a more peaceful and financially stable life, according to the band's leader Frank Bornemann.

Some music critics believe that Eloy's sound was heavily influenced by Jethro Tull in the album. In particular, George Starostin feels that Eloy "rip-off" Jethro Tull in some of their songs, but "these rip-offs never sound offensive - somehow, Eloy are able to incorporate them smoothly into their own image and identity, which is certainly different from Tull's".

== Track listing ==
All songs written by Eloy

No.	Title	Length
1.	"Land of No Body"	17:14
2.	"Inside"	6:35
3.	"Future City"	5:35
4.	"Up and Down"	8:23
Total length:		37:47

2000 remastered CD reissue bonus tracks
No.	Title	Length
5.	"Daybreak" (1973 A-Side single)	3:39
6.	"On the Road" (1973 B-Side single)	2:30

== Personnel ==
Eloy

- Frank Bornemann: guitar, vocals, percussion
- Manfred Wieczorke: organ, vocals, guitar, percussion
- Wolfgang Stöcker: bass
- Fritz Randow: drums, acoustic guitar, percussion, flute

Production

- Eloy: production
- Henning Rüte: engineering (track 1)
- Thomas Kuckuck: engineering (tracks 2–4)

Artwork

- Roberto Patelli: design
