= Sweet Smoke =

American psychedelic jazz-rock band

- Promotional Postcard for Sweet Smoke (top row: Jay, Jeffery, Mike, Andy, Rochus - bottom row: Steve, Marvin, Nico)

Background information
- Origin: Brooklyn, New York, U.S.
- Genres: Progressive rock; psychedelic rock; krautrock; jazz-rock
- Years active: 1967–1974
- Label: EMI International
- Past members: Andy Dershin; Jay Dorfman; Marvin Kaminowitz; Michael Fontana; Steve Rosenstein; Jeffrey Dershin; Rochus Kuhn; Rick Greenberg; John Classi; Martin Rosenberg
- Website: sweetsmokeband.com

Sweet Smoke was an American rock band formed in Brooklyn, New York, in 1968. The group moved to Europe in 1969, living in Germany, and performing in Germany, the Netherlands and France until 1974 when the band split up. Initially, some members stayed in Europe, some went to India, but most of the band returned to the United States. Although originating in the U.S., Sweet Smoke is often referred to as a Krautrock band. Noted for their buoyant rhythms, inventive improvisations and complex musical structures, in interviews, the group says their music was influenced by Eric Clapton, Jimi Hendrix, Frank Zappa, John Coltrane and The Beatles.

== History ==
After their first performances in the U.S. and the Caribbean, the group moved to Germany and formed a commune in a farm house in the village of Hüthum, outside the city of Emmerich, about a kilometer (0.62 miles) from the border with the Netherlands. The group became well known in the region on and off the stage for their mixture of spirited musical performances combined with their interests in Eastern and Psychedelic philosophies. The original members when they arrived in Germany were Andy Dershin (bass guitar), Michael Fontana (tenor saxophone, alto recorder, vocals, percussion), Jay Dorfman (drums, percussion), Marvin Kaminowitz (lead guitar, vocals) and Victor Sacco (guitar). Victor would soon be replaced by Steve Rosenstein (rhythm guitar, vocals). In 1970 the group was approached by EMI, and they recorded their first LP, Just a Poke with German record producer Konrad "Conny” Plank.

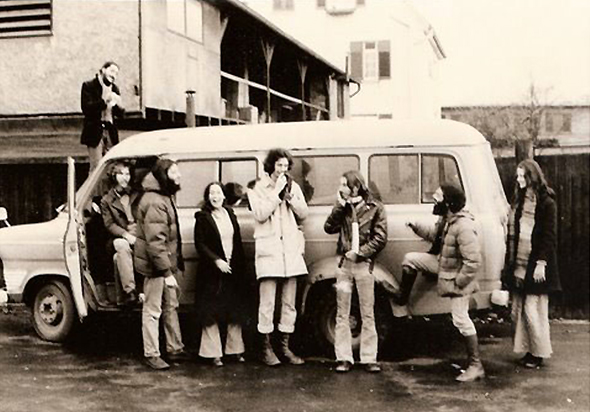
Sweet Smoke in 1974 with their Ford Transit van (from left to right: John, Rick, Andy, Enid, Marvin, Marty, Howie, Diane)

After recording Just a Poke, Sweet Smoke took a year off to travel. Most of the group drove the band's Ford Transit van overland to India for a spiritual journey in connection with the socio-spiritual group Ananda Marga. The group first learned of the success of Just a Poke, after meeting German tourists in Nepal. They returned to Europe, signed a new recording contract with EMI, and added Jeffrey Dershin (piano, percussion, vocals) as a full-time member. The group recorded their second LP Darkness to Light at EMI studios in the Netherlands in 1973. Later in 1973, Jeffery Dershin returned home to assume his role as a father, Michael Fontana left the group to return to India, and Steve Rosenstein was replaced by Rick Greenberg, aka Rick Rasa (rhythm guitar, sitar, vocals).

Near the end of 1974, the group broke up for the final time. They played their last performance in the concert hall of the music conservatory Hochschule für Musik in Berlin. The concert was recorded by EMI and became the group's last LP, Sweet Smoke Live.

== Personnel ==
=== Line-up Just a Poke (1970) ===
- Andy Dershin – bass guitar
- Jay Dorfman – drums, percussion
- Marvin Kaminowitz – lead guitar, vocals
- Michael Fontana (A.K.A. Michael Paris) – tenor saxophone, alto recorder, vocals, percussion
- Steve Rosenstein – rhythm guitar, vocals

=== Line-up Darkness to Light (1973) ===
- Andy Dershin – bass guitar
- Jay Dorfman – drums, percussion
- Marvin Kaminowitz – lead guitar, vocals
- Michael Paris – tenor saxophone, alto recorder, vocals, percussion
- Steve Rosenstein - guitar, violin, vocals
- Jeffrey Dershin - piano, percussion, vocals
- Rochus Kuhn - violin, cello

=== Line-up Sweet Smoke Live (1974) ===
- Andy Dershin – bass guitar
- Jay Dorfman – drums, percussion
- Marvin Kaminowitz – lead guitar, vocals
- Rick Greenberg (aka Rick Rasa) – rhythm guitar, sitar
- John Classi – percussion, sound effects
- Martin Rosenberg – tamboura, percussion

== Discography ==
Albums

- Just a Poke (1970)
- Darkness to Light (1973)
- Sweet Smoke Live (1974)
