= The First Flower =

Studio album by Play Dead
- Released: April 1983
- Recorded: March 1983
- Genres: Gothic rock, Post-punk, Alternative rock
- Length: 68:52
- Label: Jungle Records
- Producer: Roy Rowland

Play Dead chronology
Propaganda/Propaganda (mix) Single (1983)	The First Flower (1983)	From the Promised Land (1984)

Professional ratings
Review scores
Source	Rating
Allmusic	4/5 stars

The First Flower is Play Dead's debut album, recorded at the Jungle Records studio in March 1983. Originally titled The First Flower: A Six Track Album, this album came totally unexpectedly as the group had disappeared since their last record company Fresh Records had gone under. The album was reissued in 1993 as simply The First Flower and included ten extra tracks. Four of the ten extra tracks featured original guitarist Re-Vox.

== Track listing ==
All songs written by Play Dead.

1. "Time" – 4:06
2. "The Tenant" – 5:37
3. "Propaganda" – 3:10
4. "Sin of Sins" – 5:27
5. "In Silence" – 3:46
6. "Don't Leave Without Me" – 4:22
7. "Shine" – 3:39
8. "Gaze" – 4:30
9. "Promise" – 3:54
10. "Propaganda (mix)" – 3:02
11. "Propaganda (1984 mix)" – 4:03
12. "Sin of Sins (1984 mix)" – 6:05
13. "Poison Takes a Hold" – 4:23
14. "Introduction" – 4:28
15. "T.V. Eye" – 4:03
16. "Final Epitaph" – 4:10

== Personnel ==
- Rob Hickson - vocals
- Pete Waddleton - bass
- Steve Green (play dead) - guitar
- Re-Vox - Tracks 13,14,15, and 16 guitar
- Mark "Wiff" Smith - drums
- Roy Rowland - producer
