= Resurrection (Play Dead album) =

Studio album by Play Dead
- Released: 1992
- Recorded: March 1984
- Genre: Gothic rock, Post-punk, Alternative rock
- Length: 78:45
- Label: Clay
- Producer: John Fryer and Play Dead

Play Dead chronology
Caught from Behind: Live in England, France, Germany, and Switzerland (1986)	Resurrection (1992)	Gothic Rock Volume 2: 80's into 90's (1995)

Originally released in 1984, Play Dead's "Resurrection" is an eclectic album compared to their other releases. It ranges from synth-based tracks like "Conspiracy" to non-synth like "Pale Fire" and "Sacrosanct."

The first release of "Resurrection" was "From the Promised Land". When "From the Promised Land" was originally released in May 1984, Play Dead decided they were dissatisfied with the recordings. At this time, only 1,000 copies of the original LP were pressed and released. The band remixed the eight tracks on the album, and it was rereleased shortly thereafter, with every copy featuring the new mixes marked with a "Remix" sticker on the front cover. This was the second release of From the Promised Land. The third edition was retitled Resurrection and featured eight new tracks. The song "Weeping Blood" was not included on the third edition, though it was available on the first two editions as well as the 2007 reissue.

== Track listing ==
All songs written by Play Dead.

1. "Break" – 3:45
2. "Isabel (remix)" – 4:53
3. "Walk Away (remix)" – 3:43
4. "Bloodstains" – 4:08
5. "Solace (remix)" – 5:39
6. "No Motive (remix)" – 4:25
7. "Pleasureland (remix)" – 5:27
8. "Pale Fire" – 3:56
9. "Sacrosanct" – 3:43
10. "Torn on Desire (remix)" – 4:30
11. "Holy Holy" – 4:10
12. "Return to the East (remix)" – 4:09
13. "Conspiracy" – 4:32
14. "Sin of Sins (live 1985)" – 4:27
15. "Bloodstain Pleasure (12" mix)" – 5:13
16. "Solace (12" mix)" – 5:40
17. "Holy Holy (catholic mix)" – 6:13

== Personnel ==
- Rob Hickson - vocals
- Pete Waddleton - bass
- Steve Green - guitar
- Mark "Wiff" Smith - drums
