= Ludwig's Law =

Studio album by Dieter Moebius, Conny Plank, Mayo Thompson
- Released: 1998
- Recorded: 1983
- Genre: Krautrock; Techno; Electronic music Electronica
- Length: 36:22
- Label: Drag City
- Producer: Plank & Dieter Moebius

Moebius & Plank chronology
| En Route (1995) | Ludwig's Law (1998) |

Professional ratings
Review scores
| Source | Rating |
|---|---|
| Allmusic | 2.5/5 stars |

Ludwig's Law is the one and only album released by trio of Dieter Moebius, Conny Plank, and Mayo Thompson. It was actually the fourth album recorded by the team of Moebius & Plank. In 1983 the duo recorded a series of electronic tracks using an Emulator, an early form of sampling keyboard that enabled them to duplicate other instruments without having to deal with the musicians who played them. Mayo Thompson of Red Krayola recorded a series of monologues and vocal tracks which were added to the music Moebius & Plank had recorded. According to the Earpiece website "topics include the fate of chickens owned by a 'farmer gabriel' and the effect of lack of sunlight on human intelligence." Sky Records, which had released the first three Moebius & Plank album, rejected the master and Ludwig's Law was relegated to the vault. It was finally released on November 16, 1998 on the Drag City label.

Bill Meyer, who wrote the editorial review for Amazon.com, describes the album, in part: "The duo recorded a series of stately fanfares and brittle Talking Heads funk, over which Thompson narrated a series of skewed monologues about philosophy, art, history, and careless farmers."

Despite the rejection of Ludwig's Law by Sky, Moebius & Plank did decide to tour and perform the music, albeit without Mayo Thompson. Conny Plank fell ill while touring in South America and finally succumbed to cancer in 1987.

== Track listing ==
1. "Scientists" - 0:38
2. "Das Apartment" - 4:30
3. "The Truth?" - 5:14
4. "Ludwig's Law" - 4:20
5. "42" - 3:44
6. "Farmer Gabriel" - 4:51
7. "Gestalt" - 4:43
8. "Taras Bulba" - 5:06
9. "Boy Boy Boy" - 3:16

== Personnel ==
- Dieter Moebius
- Conny Plank
- Mayo Thompson - vocals
