= Zuckerzeit =

Studio album by Cluster
- Released: 1974
- Recorded: January 1974
- Genre: Electronic; avant-pop; kosmische; electronic pop; krautrock
- Length: 36:13
- Label: Brain
- Producer: Cluster; Michael Rother

Cluster chronology
Cluster II (1972)	Zuckerzeit (1974)	Sowiesoso (1976)

Zuckerzeit (German: Sugar Time) is the third studio album by German band Cluster, released in 1974 on Brain Records. It was co-produced by Michael Rother, their bandmate in side-project Harmonia. The music on Zuckerzeit marks a shift from Cluster's abrasive early work toward a more rhythmic, pop-oriented sound. Pitchfork ranked the album at number 63 on its list of the top 100 albums of the 1970s, while writer and musician Julian Cope included Zuckerzeit in his "Krautrock Top 50" list.

== Background ==
Zuckerzeit was recorded following Cluster's move from West Berlin to the countryside of Forst, and came after their collaboration with Neu! guitarist Michael Rother on the 1973 Harmonia album Musik von Harmonia. The album's short instrumental tracks marked the group's shift toward a pop-oriented style which utilized cheap drum machines and synthesizers. Each track is a solo composition, with the two members recording separately on different days; The Quietus noted that "it is in reality two solo EPs masquerading as a joint release."

Rother is credited as co-producer, but his primary role was to leave the group some of his equipment, including Farfisa instruments, a four-track recorder, a stereo mixer, and an Elka Drummer One drum machine. With the latter, the group experimented with mixing up multiple preset rhythms at once, as well as running the drum machine through echo, vibrato, and wah pedals, and cutting parts of the rhythm entirely.

== Reception ==
Professional ratings
Review scores
Source	Rating
AllMusic	4.5/5 stars
Mojo	5/5 stars
Pitchfork	9.0/10

John Bush of AllMusic described Zuckerzeit as "an unexpected jump from the extended kosmische jams of Cluster 71 into uncharted territory [...] fusing the duo's haunted melodic sense with crisp, scratchy drum programs." Andy Beta of Pitchfork described it as "electronic pop at its most protean," and compared it to "a sugar overload: giddy, infectious, manic and a little queasy." Peter Cauvel of Vinyl Me, Please stated that "even with drum machines and synths, Cluster pushed past the rigidity that defined their more successful peers in Kraftwerk, making spacier, improvisational electronic music."

=== Legacy ===
In a review of Cluster's 1971–1981 box set, AllMusic's Paul Simpson called the album a "masterpiece [that] combined trippy drum machine rhythms with woozy, pastoral melodies, resulting in a skewed, playful vision of futuristic pop. The recording remains a watershed moment in electronic music, and is easily one of the best albums of the '70s." Writer Ulrich Adelt stated that the album's "influence on electronic music was significant, and many more contemporary groups have copied [its] lo-fi sound." The Quietus stated that the album "surely have been a template for so many of Warp's early roster of artists."

Pitchfork ranked the album at number 63 on its list of the top 100 albums of the 1970s. Among its fans are Brian Eno and Julian Cope, with Cope including Zuckerzeit in his "Krautrock Top 50" list.

== Track listing ==
Side one
No.	Title	Writer(s)	Length
1.	"Hollywood"	Hans-Joachim Roedelius	4:48
2.	"Caramel"	Dieter Moebius	2:58
3.	"Rote Riki"	Moebius	6:18
4.	"Rosa"	Roedelius	4:13

Side two
No.	Title	Writer(s)	Length
5.	"Caramba"	Moebius	3:57
6.	"Fotschi Tong"	Roedelius	4:21
7.	"James"	Moebius	3:21
8.	"Marzipan"	Roedelius	3:14
9.	"Rotor"	Moebius	2:40
10.	"Heiße Lippen"	Roedelius	2:23

== Personnel ==
- Hans-Joachim Roedelius
- Dieter Moebius
- Michael Rother – production
