= Play Dead (band) =

English rock band

- Origin: Oxford, England
- Genres: Post-punk; gothic rock
- Years active: 1980–1986
- Labels: Fresh Records, Situation Two, Clay Records, Tanz
- Past members: Rob Hickson; Steve Green; Pete Waddleton; Mark "Wiff" Smith

Play Dead were an English rock band from Oxford formed in 1980 by Rob Hickson, Pete Waddleton, Mark "Wiff" Smith and Re-Vox.

== Career ==
The original line-up of Play Dead consisted of Rob Hickson (vocals), Pete Waddleton (bass guitar), Mark "Wiff" Smith (drums) and Re-Vox (guitar). In July 1981, Re-Vox was replaced by Steve Green. During their active years, Play Dead supported a number of acts, including the likes of Killing Joke, The Cult and The Sisters Of Mercy in the UK. They also appeared on Channel 4's music TV show, The Tube in late 1984.

The band made three studio albums and one-off singles for four different small labels such as Fresh Records, Jungle Records, Situation 2 and Clay Records. They formed their own label, Tanz, for their final album, Company of Justice, produced by Conny Plank, which they released in 1985.

A string of singles were released (many through Stoke-based Clay Records) from late 1983, throughout 1984 and early 1985. Play Dead toured frequently around the UK and Europe and by 1985, felt they had enough material to be able to put out their first ever live album, Into The Fire, which was released in May of that year. However, against the backdrop of similar artists such as Spear Of Destiny, The Cult, The Sisters Of Mercy and Fields Of The Nephilim, whose success was evident through having higher profiles in the music press, Play Dead struggled to compete.

In 1984, Rob and Pete created the project Mankind's Audio Development (nicknamed M.A.D.). Only one single was recorded, with the two songs "Craving" and "Sunfeast." Waddleton left the group in 1986 and, after a brief period as The Beastmaster Generals, the band dissolved.

== Discography ==
=== Albums ===
- 1983 - The First Flower [freud 3] - #10 UK Indie
- 1984 - From the Promised Land [CLAY LP 11] - #5 UK Indie
- 1985 - Into the Fire [CLAY LP 16] - #19 UK Indie
- 1985 - Company of Justice [TANZLP1] - #3 UK Indie
- 1992 - Resurrection

=== 12" singles ===
- September 1983 - "Shine/Promise/Gaze" [SIT 28T]
- March 1984 - "Break/Blood Stains/Blood Stains Pleasure" [12 CLAY 31]
- July 1984 - "Isabel/Solace (Extended Version)" [12 CLAY 35]
- 1984 - "Propaganda (1984 Mix)/Sin of Sins (1984 Mix)" [JUNG 17]
- 1984 - "Conspiracy/Silent Conspiracy/Conspiracy (Saigon Mix)" [12 CLAY 40]
- 1985 - "Sacrosanct/Pale Fire/Holy Holy (Catholic Mix)/Sacrosanct (Heretic Mix)" [12 CLAY 42]
- 1985 - "This Kind of Heaven/This Kind of Heaven (Serious Mix)/Last Degree" [TANZ 1]
- 1985 - "Burning Down (MezCal Mix)/Still in Chains/Burning Down" [TANZ 2]

=== 7" singles ===
- 1981 - "Poison Takes a Hold/Introduction" [FRESH 29]
- 1981 - "T.V. Eye/Final Epitaph" [FRESH 38]
- 1982 - "Propaganda/Propaganda (Mix)" [JUNG 2]
- 1983 - "Shine/Promise" [SIT 28] - #14 UK Indie
- 1984 - "Break/Blood Stains" [CLAY 31] - #9 UK Indie
- 1984 - "Isabel/Solace" [CLAY 35] - #9 UK Indie
- 1984 - "Conspiracy/Silent Conspiracy" [CLAY 40] - #18 UK Indie
- 1984 - "Propaganda (1984 mix)" [JUNG 17] - #17 UK Indie
- 1985 - "Sacrosanct/Pale Fire" [CLAY 42] - #4 UK Indie
- 1985 - "This Side of Heaven" [TANZ 1] - #5 UK Indie

=== BBC Radio 1 - John Peel Sessions ===
- 1982 - Metallic Smile/Pray to Mecca/Propaganda/Effigy
- 1983 - Total Decline/The Tenant/Gaze
- 1984 - Break/Return to the East/No Motive

=== Bootlegs ===
- 1983 - May 12, 1983 Leeds Warehouse
- 1983 - Live in Norwich, Ska Ballroom - May 13, 1983
- 1983 - Live - July 28, 1983 Hull, Dingwalls / Live October 13, 1983 Hammersmith, Klub Foot
- 1984 - Live in France at Forum Des Halles - July 1, 1984
- 1984 - Oct 7th, Kolingsborg, Stockholm, Sweden
- 1984 - Live in Norrkoping Sweden - October 10, 1984
- 1985 - Dec 18th 1985, Tufnel Park, Penthouse, London(previously listed as 1984 )
- 2003 - The Final Pieces (Bootleg)

=== Album appearances ===
- 1985 - The Final Epitaph Live
- 1985 - The Singles 1982 ~ 85
- 1986 - In the Beginning - The 1981 Singles
- 1986 - Caught from Behind: Live in England, France, Germany, and Switzerland
- 1992 - Gothic Rock Volume 1
- 1995 - Gothic Rock Volume 2: 80's Into 90's
- 1998 - Gothic Rock Volume 3: Black on Black

== Side projects ==
- Mankind's Audio Development - 1984 by Rob Hickson and Pete Waddleton
