= Company of Justice =

Company Of Justice

Studio album by Play Dead
- Released: 1985
- Recorded: July 1985
- Genre: Gothic rock, Post-punk, Alternative rock
- Length: 48:28
- Label: Tanz
- Producer: Conny Plank

Play Dead chronology
From the Promised Land (1984)	Company Of Justice (1985)	Into the Fire Live (1985)

Company of Justice is the final studio album of Play Dead. After an early series of signing with independent record labels (Fresh, Jungle, Situation 2 and Clay), Play Dead created their own record label called Tanz in early 1985 (under the umbrella of Red Rhino) just after the end of the From the Promised Land tour and used their label to release Company of Justice and the singles taken from it.

The songs "Last Degree" and "Burning Down (long version)" were not part of the original LP release in 1985. "Burning Down (long version)" is also known as "Burning Down (Mezcal mix)." The short version of "Burning Down" is not available on CD.

The album was produced by Konrad (Conny) Plank after he was asked by Brian Eno to produce what was to become U2’s Joshua Tree album, but declined, reportedly saying “I can’t work with that singer”.

== Track listing ==
All songs written by Play Dead.

1. "Witnesses" – 4:03
2. "Caught on the Thorns" – 4:13
3. "Company of Justice" – 4:40
4. "This Side of Heaven (short version)" – 3:19
5. "Judgement" – 4:36
6. "Chains" – 4:07
7. "Celebration" – 3:40
8. "Sacrosanct (1985 version)" – 3:39
9. "Treason" – 1:17
10. "Reward" – 5:59
11. "Last Degree" – 3:34
12. "Burning Down (long version)" – 5:07

== Personnel ==
- Rob Hickson - vocals
- Pete Waddleton - bass
- Steve Green - guitar
- Mark "Wiff" Smith - drums
- Conny Plank - producer
