= En Route (album) =

Studio album by Moebius & Plank
- Released: 1995
- Recorded: 1986
- Genre: Krautrock; experimental; electronica
- Length: 54:55
- Label: Curious Music
- Producer: Plank & Moebius

Moebius & Plank chronology
Zero Set (1983)	En Route (1995)	Ludwig's Law (1998)

En Route is the fourth full-length album released by German electronic music duo of Dieter Moebius and Conny Plank. It was actually the fifth and final album recorded before Plank's death in 1987. En Route was recorded in 1986 at Conny's Studio outside of Cologne. As Plank's health deteriorated the recordings were left incomplete. The album was completed and mixed by Moebius & Gebhard. The 11th through 13th tracks on the CD are remixes by Manu Guiot done in 1995. It was released by the Dubuque, Iowa-based Curious Music label in 1995.

The Sonic Curiosity review of En Route describes the album, in part: "...rhythmic and wrought with weird sounds and insectoid chitterings. [...] Less frantic than their earlier work, "En Route" qualifies the quirky melodies with a seriousness, endowing the weirdness with a sedate charm. The introduction of horns to the glistening mix of mechanical and ethereal sounds reinforces this approach." Writers and Krautrock historians Steven and Alan Freeman are less than enthusiastic about En Route, claiming that this album, like Zero Set before it, is "... too close to techno for comfort" despite the fact that very little of this album would be welcome on the dance floor.

En Route was digitally remastered and reissued by Captain Trip Records on November 27, 2007.

== Track listing ==
1. "Automatic" - 5:17
2. "Don't Point The Bone" - 5:03
3. "Drum!" - 4:47
4. "EChaos" - 3:25
5. "Muffler A" - 4:45
6. "Pick The Rubber" - 4:33
7. "The Truth?" - 3:28
8. "Prehistoric" - 2:37
9. "Die Wirren" - 3:26
10. "Muffler B" - 2:25
11. "Don't Point The Bone" (remix) - 5:09
12. "Automatic" (remix) - 4:21
13. "Prehistoric" (remix) - 5:38

== Personnel ==
- Dieter Moebius
- Conny Plank
