= Uli Trepte =

German musician

Uli Trepte (born 27 September 1941, Konstanz, Germany — died 21 May 2009, Berlin) was a German musician best known for his collaborations with various influential Krautrock bands in the early 1970s.

== Early career ==
Uli Trepte began his musical career in 1966 on double bass as a free jazz player/founder member of the Irene Schweizer Trio, a formation that wrote avantgarde history (Frankfurt Jazz Festival 66/1. Montreux Jazz Festival 67/Donaueschinger Tage für Neue Musik 67/Berliner Jazztage 67; 2 LPs). At about that time and later he also appeared with jazz musicians like Yusef Lateef, Gato Barbieri, Barney Wilen, John McLaughlin and Mal Waldron.

== Guru Guru ==
In 1968 he changed to bass guitar and with drummer Mani Neumeier formed Guru Guru as part of the newly emerging psychedelic rock music, writing both lyrics and music for that group. It was a band which set a radical new playing standard and belonged to the few genuine pioneers of the so-called Krautrock (International Essen Song Days/Essener Rock- und Blues Tage 69/many festivals; 3TV appearances; 3 LPs).

== Neu! ==
He left the group in 1972, to play with the Kraut Rock bands Neu!, Faust and Kickbit Information. During 1973 he toured the United Kingdom with them.

== Spacebox ==
In 1975 founded his own group, Spacebox, to realize his concept of an authentic European, cyclic structured, minor dominated, modal harmonic, collective improvised, organic-electric live music as a player, composer and songwriter.

From 1975 to the early 1980s, his main performance work was through his Spacebox project. With it he performed solo in Berlin und London where he stayed for about half a year each (e.g. Performance Weeks ´London Calling`/New London Theater/Avantgarde Center Oval, all in 1976/1977), enlarged it in 1978 to a quartet in Munich and gained an international reputation as an extremely un-normed, uncommercial underground figure (Kohfidisch Festival 78/Umsonst&Draußen Festivals 78+79/Münchener Performance Wochen 79 und Münchener Jazzfest 80; 2 LPs).

In 1981 he spent six months in Tokyo, one year in New York City in 1982, and after disbanding Spacebox, to live from 1985 in Berlin, where he reduced his original music to a mainly instrumental one, realizing it with selected musicians on sound carriers (1 LP, 1 CD), in the last years giving more priority to the playing of his Modal Minor Constant Structure Blues and working at the same time in cooperation with the Dutch multimedia artist Aja Waalwijk on the elaborate song project Takes on Words (2 CDs).

As the quintessence of his musical concept he led 96-01 Move Groove, the Modal Groove Concept, with whom – including the involvement of musicians such as Hans Hartmann (ex Guru Guru) and Edgar Hofmann (ex Embryo) – he also played live again (Herzberg Festival 96/Turkey tour 98; 2 CDs).

== Later life ==
From 2002 he only performed as a solo act called "Bass+Lyrik", but releasing recordings of strictly instrumental music resulting from different sessions with the participation of – besides the above-mentioned – Chris Karrer (Amon Düül) and Geoff Leigh (Henry Cow) (2 CDs).

Uli Trepte died on 21 May 2009 in Berlin after a "long bout with cancer".

== Discography (selected) ==
with Guru Guru:

- Ufo (1970)
- Hinten (1971)
- Kan-guru (1972)
- Der Elektrolurch (1977) Compilation
- The Story of Life (1979)
- Rock on Brain (1980) Comp.
- Spaceship (1996)
- 30 Jahre Live (1998) 3 CD-Box
- Very Best of Guru Guru (1999)
- Essen 1970 (2003)

with Spacebox:

- Spacebox (1981) (vinyl limited to 1000 copies)
- Kick Up (1984)

== Solo ==
- Real time music (1996)
- Groove along with dong (1998)
- Yestermorrow Songs (2000) with Aja Waalwijk
- Staticsphere (2001)
- Rollomat (2004)
- Multiphonic music (2006)
- Incredible world (2007) with Aja Waalwijk
- Portrait (2009) (Compilation)
