= Cluster II (album) =

Studio album by Cluster
- Released: 1972
- Recorded: January 1972
- Studio: Star-Studio, Hamburg, Germany
- Genre: Krautrock; electronic; space rock; ambient
- Length: 45:09
- Label: Brain
- Producer: Cluster & Conrad Plank

Cluster chronology
Cluster (1971)	Cluster II (1972)	Zuckerzeit (1974)

Cluster II is the second full-length album by German electronic music act Cluster, released in 1972 by record label Brain.

== Production ==
It is their first album with the band reduced to a duo; Conny Plank, who was credited as a member on the first album, decided to concentrate on production and engineering. Plank is still credited as a composer together with Hans-Joachim Roedelius and Dieter Moebius on all tracks.

Cluster II was recorded at Star-Studio in Hamburg, Germany in January 1972.

It was Cluster's first release for legendary krautrock label Brain, a relationship which would last until 1975 and include the subsequent album Zuckerzeit as well as the first two Harmonia albums, a group which included both remaining members of Cluster and Michael Rother of Neu!.

== Content ==
Cluster II continued the transition away from the discordant, proto-industrial sound of Kluster towards a more electronic sound. It was the first album to feature relatively short tracks and it was the first album in which tracks were named. (Earlier Kluster albums as well as the eponymous first Cluster album had unnamed pieces.)

== Release ==
The album was first reissued on CD in 1994 on the Spalax label with subsequent reissues on Universal in 2004, Revisited in 2007 and Esoteric in 2012.

== Reception ==
Professional ratings
Review scores
Source	Rating
AllMusic	3/5 stars
Pitchfork	7.7/10

Julian Cope included Cluster II in his "Krautrock Top 50" list.

== Track listing ==
All tracks written by Hans-Joachim Roedelius, Dieter Moebius and Conrad Plank.

Side A

1. "Plas" – 6:00
2. "Im Süden" ("In the South") – 12:50
3. "Für die Katz'" ("For the Cat") – 3:00

Side B

1. "Live in der Fabrik" ("Live in the Factory") – 14:50
2. "Georgel" – 5:25
3. "Nabitte" ("Please") – 2:40

== Personnel ==
- Hans-Joachim Roedelius – electronics
- Dieter Moebius – electric organ, guitars, effects & electronics
- Conrad Plank – producer
