= The Meteors (Dutch band) =

The Meteors were a Dutch new wave band active 1977 to 1982. Band members included singer Hugo Sinzheimer, Åke Danielson (keyboards) Ferdinand Bakker (guitar), Gerrit Veen (bass) and Kim Haworth (drums).

== Discography ==
=== Albums ===
- 1979 - Teenage Heart, LP, Bovema Negram, 5C 064-26235
- 1980 - Hunger, LP, EMI Group, 1A 062-26540, 1980 - No. 30
- 1982 - Stormy Seas, LP, CNR Records, 655155, 1982
- 2004 - Teenage Heart Xtra, EMI reissue of 1979 album with extra tracks
- 2005 - Hunger Xtra, EMI, reissue of 1980 album

=== Singles ===
- "It's You, Only You" (Mein Schmerz), 7", 1979, Negram 5C 006-26213, b/w "Night Life"
- "Candy", 7 inch, 1980, Harvest 1A 006-26594, b/w "It Sucks"
- "Pilot", 7 inch, 1980, Harvest, 1A 006-26447, b/w "Pilot Conversation"
- "Together Too Long", 7 inch, 1980, Harvest, 1A 006-26539, b/w "Out of the Race"
- "No Way In, No Way Out", 7 inch, 1981, Harvest, 006-26645, b/w "Charms or Chains"
- "Stormy Seas", 7 inch, 1982, CNR, 144926, b/w "Shoot or Be Shot"
- "Cha no yu", maxi disco single, 1982, CNR, 151.084 b/w "Expedition 2 (Radio Version)"
