= Cluster (album) =

- Cluster 71 edition cover

Studio album by Cluster
- Released: 1971
- Recorded: 1971
- Genre: Kosmische; drone; electronic; krautrock; space music
- Length: 44:28
- Label: Philips
- Producer: Conrad Plank

Cluster chronology
Cluster (1971)	Cluster II (1972)

Professional ratings
Review scores
Source	Rating
AllMusic	4.5/5 stars
Pitchfork	8.5/10

Cluster (also reissued as Cluster 71) is the debut studio album by German electronic music outfit Cluster. It was recorded in 1971 and released the same year by record label Philips. It is also the only album on which producer Conny Plank is credited as a member.

== Music ==
Cluster began a transition away from the discordant industrial sound of their earlier group Kluster towards softer atmospheres. Instrumentation included a pair of organs, Hawaiian guitar, cello and audio generators, all played by Moebius and Roedelius and all of which were electronically treated by Conny Plank.

Thom Jurek of AllMusic described Cluster as "a dislocating, disorienting meld of random space music, industrial noise, proto-ambient atmospherics, feedback and soundwash". Spencer Grady of BBC Music stated that "far from providing mere background ambience, [the album's] rolling waves of hypnosis are continually exposed to perforation by disorienting surges of energy, imparting wake-up calls to comfort.

== Release ==
Cluster was released in 1971 by record label Philips; Cluster's only release for the label.

The album was reissued with new artwork and a new title, Cluster 71, by Sky Records in 1980. Cluster 71 was digitally remastered (from a vinyl source, not a tape) and reissued on CD in 1996 by Sky with new artwork: a total of three different cover designs for the album to date. It received its first U.S release in 2006 on the San Francisco based Water label. The Water reissue restored the original Philips cover art but retains the Cluster 71 name. A 1,000 copy limited remastered edition of Cluster 71 with the original Sky LP cover art was reissued by the Japanese Captain Trip label as a CD on September 20, 2007. It was re-released once again in 2010 by Bureau-B with the original cover art and running order, but again mastered from an LP.

== Legacy ==
The Wire placed Cluster's self-titled debut album in their list "One Hundred Records That Set the World on Fire". Spencer Grady of BBC Music depicted the album as an influence on artists like Brian Eno, John Foxx, and Coil, as well as "a new global network of synth-powered cosmonauts [...] from Emeralds and Oneohtrix Point Never to Mountains, Astral Social Club and the Ghost Box imprint," stating that "each owes a colossal debt to Cluster and this album in particular." The Wire wrote that Cluster "prefigures illbient by about 20 years, parts of it sounding uncannily like DJ Spooky", while crediting "patches of regular thudding thudding pulse" for conjuring up "a malformed techno". They praised the album for fusing new possibilities for "electronic noise production" with the "repetitions and resonances" of dub music, resulting in music that resembles "space music with a severe hangover."

== Track listing ==
Side one
No.	Title	Length
1.	"7:42"	7:42
2.	"15:43"	15:43

Side two
No.	Title	Length
1.	"21:32"	21:32

The 1980 Sky label edition reverses the order of the tracks on Side 1.

== Personnel ==
- Hans-Joachim Roedelius – organ, electronically treated cello, audio-generator, amplifier
- Dieter Moebius – organ, Hawaiian guitar, audio-generator, amplifier, helias
- Conrad Plank – electronics, effects, producer
