= Zero Set =

Studio album by Moebius Plank Neumeier
- Released: 1983
- Recorded: 1982
- Genre: Krautrock, Neue Deutsche Welle, proto-techno
- Length: 37:36
- Label: Sky Records
- Producer: Conny Plank, Dieter Moebius, Mani Neumeier

Moebius & Plank chronology
Material (1981)	Zero Set (1983)	En Route (1995)

Professional ratings
Review scores
Source	Rating
AllMusic	4/5 stars

Zero Set is the only album by the German electronic music trio of Dieter Moebius, Conny Plank, and Mani Neumeier. It followed two collaborations by Moebius & Plank as a duo. Zero Set was recorded in September, 1982 at Conny's Studio outside Cologne, and released by Sky Records in 1983. The track "Recall" features Sudanese vocals by Deuka.

Zero Set was reissued by the Gyroscope label on CD on April 16, 1996. This was the first U.S. release for the album. It was also digitally remastered and reissued by Captain Trip Records in Japan on February 25, 2007.

== Reception ==
Matthew Weiner describes it for Soulmind Online: "Though not a dance record per se, Zero Set is one of the earliest extensions of Krautrock’s possibilities on the dance floor, pitting the profoundly electronic sequence patterns of Plank and Moebius against the hyperactive percussives of Guru Guru drummer Mani Neumeier. On tracks such as the prophetically titled 'Speed Display' and 'Pitch Control', the phasing, chattering and decidedly Germanic grooves found on Zero Set constitute vibrant proto-techno at its earliest and finest." David Ross Smith, writing for Allmusic, describes the album: "...a highly percussive affair with Mani Neumeier. The album is saturated in drum and synth rhythms and polyrhythms, resulting in compositions that are energetic and infectious." Zero Set was a turning point for Moebius and Plank, a fact lamented by Steven and Alan Freeman in their book The Crack In The Cosmic Egg. They say, in part: "...working with Mani Neumeier on Zero Set strangely took the music too close to techno for comfort..."

In 2007 Dieter Moebius and Mani Neumeier recorded Zero Set II in Japan as a tribute to Conny Plank.

== Track listing ==
1. "Speed Display" (5:13)
2. "Load" (5:20)
3. "Pitch Control" (6:23)
4. "All Repro" (3:28)
5. "Recall" (8:34)
6. "Search Zero" (8:38)

== Personnel ==
- Dieter Moebius – synthesizers, keyboards
- Conny Plank – production
- Mani Neumeier – drums
- Deuka – vocals on "Recall"
