= Rastakraut Pasta =

Studio album by Moebius & Plank
- Released: 1980
- Recorded: 1979
- Genre: Krautrock, kosmische musik, experimental, electronic
- Length: 35:08
- Label: Sky Records
- Producer: Plank & Moebius

Moebius & Plank chronology
Rastakraut Pasta (1980)	Material (1981)

Rastakraut Pasta is the first full-length album by German electronic music duo of Dieter Moebius and Conny Plank.

Rastakraut Pasta was recorded in September 1979 at Conny's Studio outside of Cologne. It was released by Sky Records in 1980. Instrumentation on the album includes electronics, voice, guitar, and flute, all of which are credited to both Moebius & Plank. Can alumnus Holger Czukay plays bass on three tracks: "Feedback 66", "Missi Cacadou", and "Two Oldtimers".

Steven and Alan Freeman, writing in The Crack In The Cosmic Egg describes Rastakraut Pasta and the 1981 follow-up Material, in part, this way: "Their early albums as a duo were revelations of innovation, bringing unlikely combinations of industrial rock, cosmic and even dub music (on Rastakraut Pasta) together in a hybrid of genres. A reborn spirit of Krautrock that played recklessly with offbeat forms..." Julian Cope includes Rastakraut Pasta in his Krautrock Top 50.

Both Rastakraut Pasta and Material were reissued in their entirety on a single CD on the American Gyroscope label on April 16, 1996, marking the first U.S. release for both albums. Rastakraut Pasta was reissued separately on CD in a digitally remastered, 1000 copy limited edition by the Japanese Captain Trip label on February 25, 2007.

== Track listing ==
1. "News" - 4:53
2. "Rastakraut Pasta" - 6:17
3. "Feedback 66" - 4:57
4. "Missi Cacadou" - 5:31
5. "Two Oldtimers" - 7:02
6. "Solar Plexus" - 4:55
7. "Landebahn" - 1:28

== Personnel ==
- Dieter Moebius
- Conny Plank
- Holger Czukay - bass
- Dave Hutchins - engineering
