= Material (Moebius & Plank album) =

Studio album by Moebius & Plank
- Released: 1981
- Recorded: 1981
- Genre: Krautrock; Kosmische Musik; Experimental Music; Electronic music
- Length: 34:30
- Label: Sky Records
- Producer: Plank & Moebius

Moebius & Plank chronology
Rastakraut Pasta (1980)	Material (1981)	Zero Set (1983)

Material is the second full-length album by German electronic music duo of Dieter Moebius and Conny Plank. Material was recorded in July 1981 at Conny's Studio outside of Cologne. It was released by Sky Records in 1981. Steven and Alan Freeman, writing in The Crack In The Cosmic Egg describe Material and the 1980 Moebius & Plank debut album Rastakraut Pasta, in part, this way: "Their early albums as a duo were revelations of innovation, bringing unlikely combinations of industrial rock, cosmic and even dub music (on Rastakraut Pasta) together in a hybrid of genres. A reborn spirit of Krautrock that played recklessly with offbeat forms..." The incessant, forceful beat on "Conditionierer", the opening track of Material, could easily have been suitable for club dance music if not for all the odd electronic sounds added on top.

Both Rastakraut Pasta and Material were reissued in their entirety on a single CD on the American Gyroscope label on April 16, 1996, marking the first U.S. release for both albums. Material was reissued separately on CD in a digitally remastered, 1000 copy limited edition by the Japanese Captain Trip label on February 25, 2007.

== Track listing ==
1. "Conditionierer" - 8:46
2. "Infiltration" - 7:40
3. "Tollkühn" - 6:11
4. "Osmo-Fantor" - 4:27
5. "Nordöstliches Gefühl" -7:13

== Personnel ==
- Dieter Moebius
- Conny Plank
