= Just a Poke =

Studio album by Sweet Smoke
- Released: 1970
- Genre: Progressive rock; jazz rock; psychedelic rock
- Length: 32:46
- Label: EMI Columbia
- Producer: Rosie Schmitz, Winfried Ebert

Sweet Smoke chronology
Just a Poke (1970)	Darkness to Light (1973)

Professional ratings
Review scores
Source	Rating
Sputnikmusic	5/5 stars

Just a Poke is the first album by the band Sweet Smoke, released in 1970, engineered by Conny Plank. The song "Baby Night" displays the band's progressive jazz fusion style at the time. The song can be divided into three main sections, the highlights being the instrumental sections.

== Track listing ==
Side A
No.	Title	Length
1.	"Silly Sally"	16:22

Side B
No.	Title	Length
2.	"Baby Night" (including ″In The World Of Glass Teardrops″ (A. Guillery), ″The Soft Parade″ (Jim Morrison))	16:24

== Personnel ==
- Michael Paris – tenor sax, vocals, alto recorder, percussion
- Marvin Kaminowitz – lead guitar, vocals
- Steve Rosenstein – rhythm guitar, vocals
- Andrew Dershin – bass
- Jay Dorfman – drums, percussion

== Production ==
- Engineer – Conrad Plank, Klaus Löhmer
- Photography (Linerphoto) – Joachim Hassenburs
