= After the Heat =

Studio album by Eno, Moebius and Roedelius
- Released: April 1978
- Recorded: June 1977
- Studios: Conny's Studio, Cologne, Germany
- Genres: Electronic; ambient
- Length: 40:19
- Label: Sky
- Producers: Brian Eno; Dieter Moebius; Hans-Joachim Roedelius; Conny Plank

Brian Eno chronology
Before and After Science (1977)	After the Heat (1978)	Music for Films (1978)

Cluster chronology
Cluster & Eno (1977)	After the Heat (1978)	Grosses Wasser (1979)

After the Heat is a 1978 album by Brian Eno, Dieter Moebius and Hans-Joachim Roedelius (the latter two being the core members of Cluster), credited to "Eno Moebius Roedelius". The album represents the second collaboration by the trio, the first being 1977's Cluster & Eno. As with the previous album, After the Heat was created in collaboration with the influential krautrock producer Conny Plank.

== Content ==
The track "Tzima N'Arki" contains a reversed vocal track, part of which includes the chorus of Eno's song "King's Lead Hat" (from his album Before and After Science), itself an anagram of "Talking Heads", whose recordings Eno was producing during that period. "Broken Head" makes prominent use of tape flanging on Eno's declaimed vocal.

== Reception ==
Professional ratings
Review scores
Source	Rating
AllMusic	3/5 stars
Mojo	4/5 stars
Pitchfork	9.3/10
Spin	8/10
Spin Alternative Record Guide	6/10
Tom Hull – on the Web	B+

Comparing the album to the musicians' previous collaboration Cluster & Eno (1977), Pitchfork wrote in their favourable retrospective review: "A few piano-centered instrumentals hint at the sound of the earlier record, but After the Heat exists in a fantastic sphere of its own." Trouser Press called the album "an alluring — occasionally compelling — collection of instrumentals that deftly avoid the pitfalls of ambient music".

== Track listing ==
All songs composed by Brian Eno, Dieter Moebius and Hans-Joachim Roedelius.

Side A

1. "Oil" – 4:12
2. "Foreign Affairs" – 3:30
3. "Luftschloß" ("Castle In The Air") – 3:10
4. "The Shade" – 3:08
5. "Old Land" – 4:10

Side B

1. "Base & Apex" – 4:29
2. "Light Arms" – 1:29
3. "Broken Head" – 5:25
4. "The Belldog" – 6:16
5. "Tzima N'Arki" – 4:30

The above list presents the tracks in the order they appeared on the original LP release. Some CD issues have an alternative running order.

== Personnel ==
- Brian Eno – vocals, bass guitar, synthesizers, keyboards
- Dieter Moebius – synthesizers, keyboards
- Hans-Joachim Roedelius – synthesizers, keyboards
- Holger Czukay – bass guitar on "T'zima N'arki"

Technical personnel

- Conny Plank – engineer
- Michael Weisse – cover photography
