= Sowiesoso =

Studio album by Cluster
- Released: 1976
- Recorded: 1976
- Studio: Harmonia Studio, Forst, Germany
- Genre: Electronic; ambient; krautrock
- Length: 37:18
- Label: Sky
- Producer: Cluster; Conny Plank

Cluster chronology
| Zuckerzeit (1974) | Sowiesoso (1976) | Cluster & Eno (1977) |

Alternative cover
- When Sky Records first released the album on CD in the early 1990s, this artwork from the back cover of the LP was used as the front cover. Later CD reissues have restored the original artwork.

Sowiesoso (from German: sowieso, lit. 'anyway') is the fourth studio album by German electronic music band Cluster, released in 1976. It was Cluster's first release for Sky Records. Sowiesoso was recorded in just two days in Forst, Lower Saxony, in 1976, and mixed at co-producer Conny Plank's studio in Wolperath.

== Background ==
Brian Eno had worked with Harmonia, a supergroup consisting of Cluster members Dieter Moebius and Hans-Joachim Roedelius plus Michael Rother of Neu!, prior to the recording of Sowiesoso, and later worked with Cluster alone on two albums in 1977 and 1978. Eno's influence is clearly heard on the softer and more controlled sound of Sowiesoso. Reviewer Russ Curry describes the album as "a fully realized marriage of electronic sounds with a pastoral warmth." Kevin Warwick of the Chicago Reader noted that the album's focus on "ambient electronic soundscapes" represented a divergence from the "motorik grooves" explored by Cluster's krautrock contemporaries.

== Release ==
Sowiesoso was Cluster's first release for Sky Records. Sky would serve as Cluster's label until 1986, by which time the label had released albums recorded by the band with Brian Eno, solo recordings, and three albums by the duo of Moebius and former Cluster member and frequent engineer and producer Conny Plank.

The album was first reissued on CD by Sky Records in 1992. It has also been reissued by the American label Gyroscope in 1996, the San Francisco-based Water label in 2006 and the Japanese label Captain Trip Records in 2007.

== Reception ==
Professional ratings
Review scores
| Source | Rating |
|---|---|
| AllMusic | 4/5 stars |
| Classic Rock | 8/10 |
| Mojo | 5/5 stars |
| Pitchfork | 9.2/10 |
| Record Collector | 5/5 stars |

Julian Cope included Sowiesoso in his "Krautrock Top 50" list. For The Quietus, Euan Andrews called the album "an electronic suite to pastoral living [...] which remains unparalleled in its depiction of another blissful green world. Synthetic birds chirrup, bells chime and life is easy and good."

== Track listing ==
All songs written by Hans-Joachim Roedelius and Dieter Moebius.

Side one

1. "Sowiesoso" ("Anyway") – 8:10 (on most CD reissues this track is shortened with a running time of 7:17)
2. "Halwa" – 2:47
3. "Dem Wanderer" ("The Hiker") – 3:47
4. "Umleitung" ("Detour") – 3:25

Side two

1. "Zum Wohl" ("For the Benefit") – 6:50
2. "Es War Einmal" ("One Upon a Time") – 5:25
3. "In Ewigkeit" ("In Eternity") – 7:10

== Personnel ==
- Dieter Moebius – keyboards, percussion, vocals
- Hans-Joachim Roedelius – keyboards, percussion, vocals
- Conny Plank – producer
