= Cluster & Eno =

Studio album by Cluster and Brian Eno
- Released: 1977
- Recorded: June 1977
- Studios: Conny's Studio, Cologne, Germany
- Genre: Ambient
- Length: 36:10
- Label: Sky
- Producers: Conny Plank; Cluster

Cluster chronology
Sowiesoso (1976)	Cluster & Eno (1977)	After the Heat (1978)

Brian Eno chronology
Discreet Music (1975)	Cluster & Eno (1977)	Before and After Science (1977)

Cluster & Eno is a collaborative album by the German electronic music group Cluster and the English musician Brian Eno. The style of this album is a collection of gentle melodies: a mixture of Eno's ambient sensibilities and Cluster's avant-garde style.

In June 1977, the duo of Hans-Joachim Roedelius and Dieter Moebius joined with Brian Eno for recording sessions at Conny Plank's studio. The first release from those sessions on Sky Records was Cluster & Eno. Guest musicians on the album included Can bassist Holger Czukay and Asmus Tietchens on synthesizer. The association with Eno, already well known for involvement with pop acts like Roxy Music, brought Cluster a much wider audience than previous albums and international attention.

Sky Records issued the album on CD in 1989, shuffling the running order. The American Gyroscope label reissued Cluster & Eno on CD in 1996. The album was also reissued in the United States by the San Francisco–based Water label in 2005.

== Reception ==
Professional ratings
Review scores
Source	Rating
AllMusic	4/5 stars
Mojo	3/5 stars
Pitchfork	8.7/10
Spin	9/10
Spin Alternative Record Guide	6/10

Bryan Reesman, in his editorial review for Amazon, writes, in part:

Meshing Cluster's affinity for loops and repetition and Eno's penchant for processing sounds, the trio proves that ambient music does not merely consist of drawn-out drones and insipid keyboard tapestries. Certainly many of these nine tracks play off of sustained sounds and atmospheres, but their shorter running times make them more digestible, as does their variety of moods and textures. Highlights include the angelic atmosphere of "Für Luise," the classically inspired piano interlude "Mit Samaen," and the Indian-influenced "One," a trippy progenitor of ethnoambient music, ripe with sitar drones, guitar noises, and exotic percussion that features contributions from Okko Becker and Asmus Tietchens.

== Track listing ==
All songs composed by Brian Eno, Dieter Moebius and Hans-Joachim Roedelius.

1. "Ho Renomo" – 5:07
2. "Schöne Hände" ("Beautiful Hands") – 3:03
3. "Steinsame" ("Stone Seeds") – 4:06
4. "Wehrmut" ("Wormwood") – 5:01
5. "Mit Simaen" – 1:30
6. "Selange" – 3:30
7. "Die Bunge" ("The Bungee") – 3:45
8. "One" – 6:06
9. "Für Luise" ("For Louise") – 3:20

Some editions have the track names "Wehrmut" and "Für Luise" swapped.

== Personnel ==
- Hans-Joachim Roedelius
- Dieter Moebius
- Brian Eno

Additional musicians

- Holger Czukay – bass on "Ho Renomo"
- Okko Bekker – guitar on "One"
- Asmus Tietchens – synthesizer on "One"

Technical personnel

- Conny Plank – engineer
- J. Krämer – assistant engineer
- Cluster – cover
