= Stormy Seas =

1923 film directed by J. P. McGowan

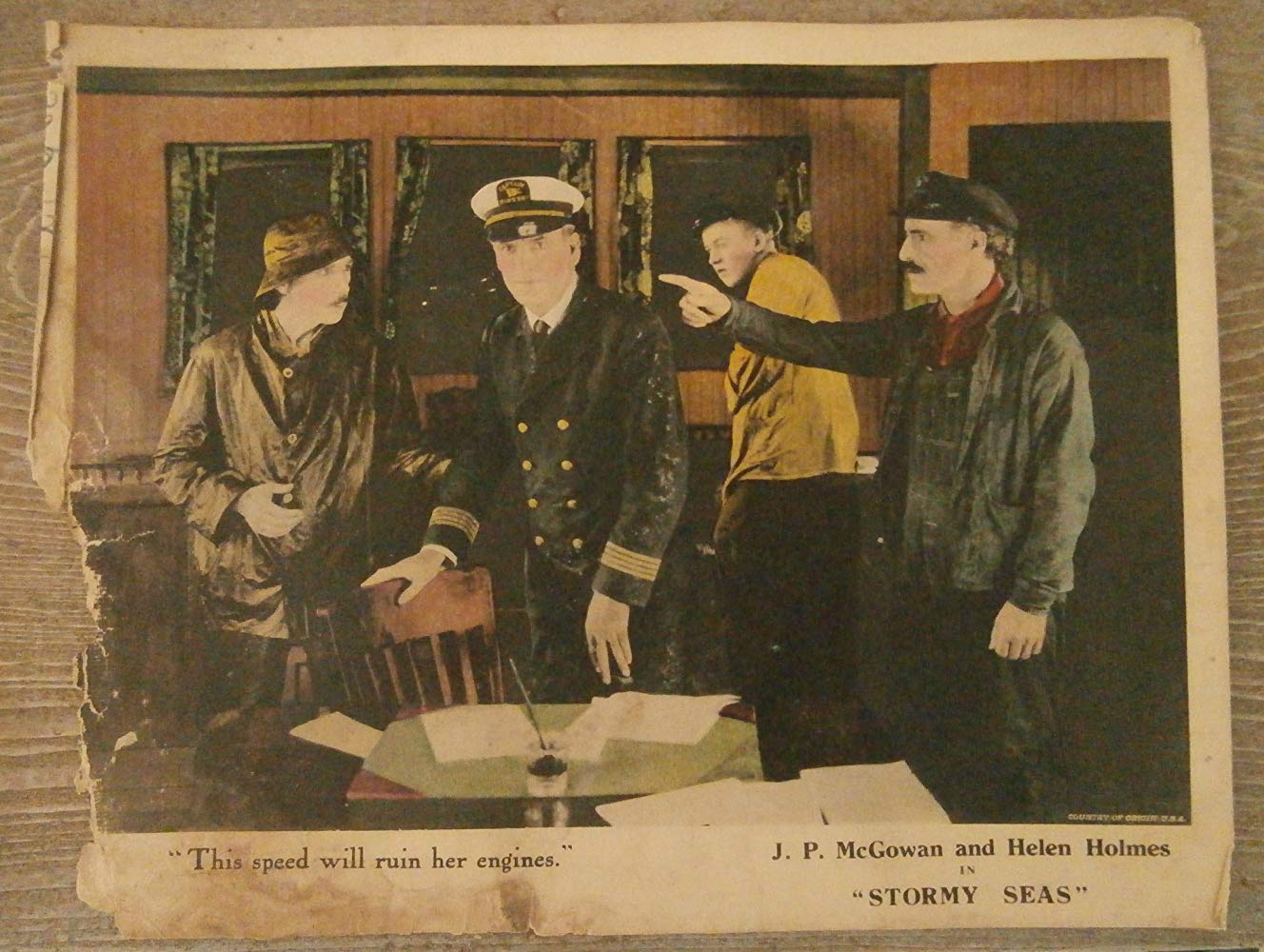
- Directed by: J.P. McGowan
- Written by: Arthur W. Donaldson
- Starring: J.P. McGowan; Helen Holmes; Leslie Casey
- Cinematography: Paul H. Allen; Hap Depew
- Production company: Continental Pictures
- Distributed by: Associated Exhibitors
- Release date: July 1, 1923
- Running time: 5 reels
- Country: United States
- Language: Silent (English intertitles)

Stormy Seas is a 1923 American silent drama film directed by J.P. McGowan and starring McGowan, Helen Holmes, and Leslie Casey.

== Cast ==
- J.P. McGowan as Capt. Morgan
- Helen Holmes as Mary Weems
- Leslie Casey as George Tracey
- Rube Dalroy as Angus McBride
- Francis Seymour as 'Storm' Weems
- Gordon Knapp as 'Shorty' - The Steward

== Preservation ==
With no prints of Stormy Seas located in any film archives, it is a lost film.

== Bibliography ==
- John J. McGowan. J.P. McGowan: Biography of a Hollywood Pioneer. McFarland, 2005.
