= Hans Reffert =

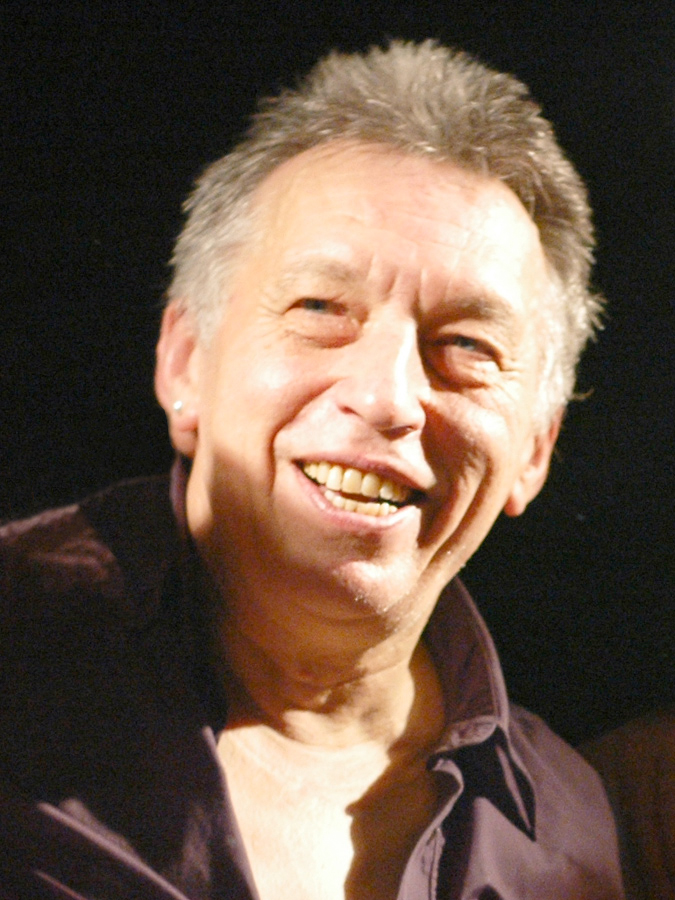
- Hans Reffert in 2006

Background information
- Born: 19 July 1946; Ludwigshafen am Rhein
- Origin: Germany
- Died: 21 February 2016 (aged 69)
- Genres: Krautrock
- Occupation(s): Musician; Guitarist
- Instrument: Guitar
- Years active: 1960–2016

Hans Reffert (19 July 1946 – 21 February 2016) was a German musician and composer.

Although possibly best known for his work with Guru Guru, Reffert was involved with a number of ensembles, including Flute & Voice, Zauberfinger, Sanfte Liebe, and Schrammel & Slide. Reffert studied guitar with Sigi Schwab and flute and composition in Mannheim. He also created commissioned works for the National Theatre Mannheim and other theaters, as well as for cinema and television productions. He died on 22 February 2016 in Mannheim aged 69.

== Discography ==
=== Solo ===
- 1988 Total Normal: Musik für Adolf Wölfli
- 2008 Westlich Bb9

=== With Flute & Voice ===
- 1970 Imaginations of Light
- 1995 Hello Rabbit (recorded 1973)
- 1996 Drachenlieder (material from 1974 to 1975)

=== With Thomas Vogel ===
- 1976 Lieder des Thomas Vogel
- 1978 Flüstern im Geschrei

=== With Werner Pöhlert ===
- 1976 Kollektiv Alte Musik

=== With Zauberfinger ===
- c.1980 Slide
- 1980 Shizzo Rock
- 1981 Zauberfinger 2

=== With Borgward ===
- 1980 Perplex
- 1982 Bermuda Dreieck / Vorwiegend Heiter

=== With Schlauch ===
- 1981 Grosse Gemeinsamkeit
- 1984 Wenn die Stadt erwacht

=== With Idole ===
- 1982 Die Idole
- 1982 Hautnah / Pfahl im Fleisch

=== With Guru Guru ===
See: Guru Guru During 1988, and again from 1997 to 2000

=== With Sanfte Liebe ===
- 1987 Sanfte Liebe
- 1991 New Flowers

=== With Schrammel & Slide ===
- 1991 Deffert + Rörsam
- 1993 Deux
- 1995 HellBillies from Venus
- 1997 Ja Ja
- 1999 Famous for Not Being Famous
- 2003 Pow Wow
- 2011 Sieben/Seven

=== With Claus Boesser-Ferrarri ===
- 2003 Nachmittag eines Fauns

=== With Mani Neumeier ===
- 2010 Der Teufel und sein Guru

=== With Werner Goos ===
- 2011 Stone Cold & Broken
- 2014 I Can't Stop the Voices in My Head

=== With Michael Bauer & Wolfgang Schuster ===
- 2015 Weltunnergangsblues
