= Mani Neumeier =

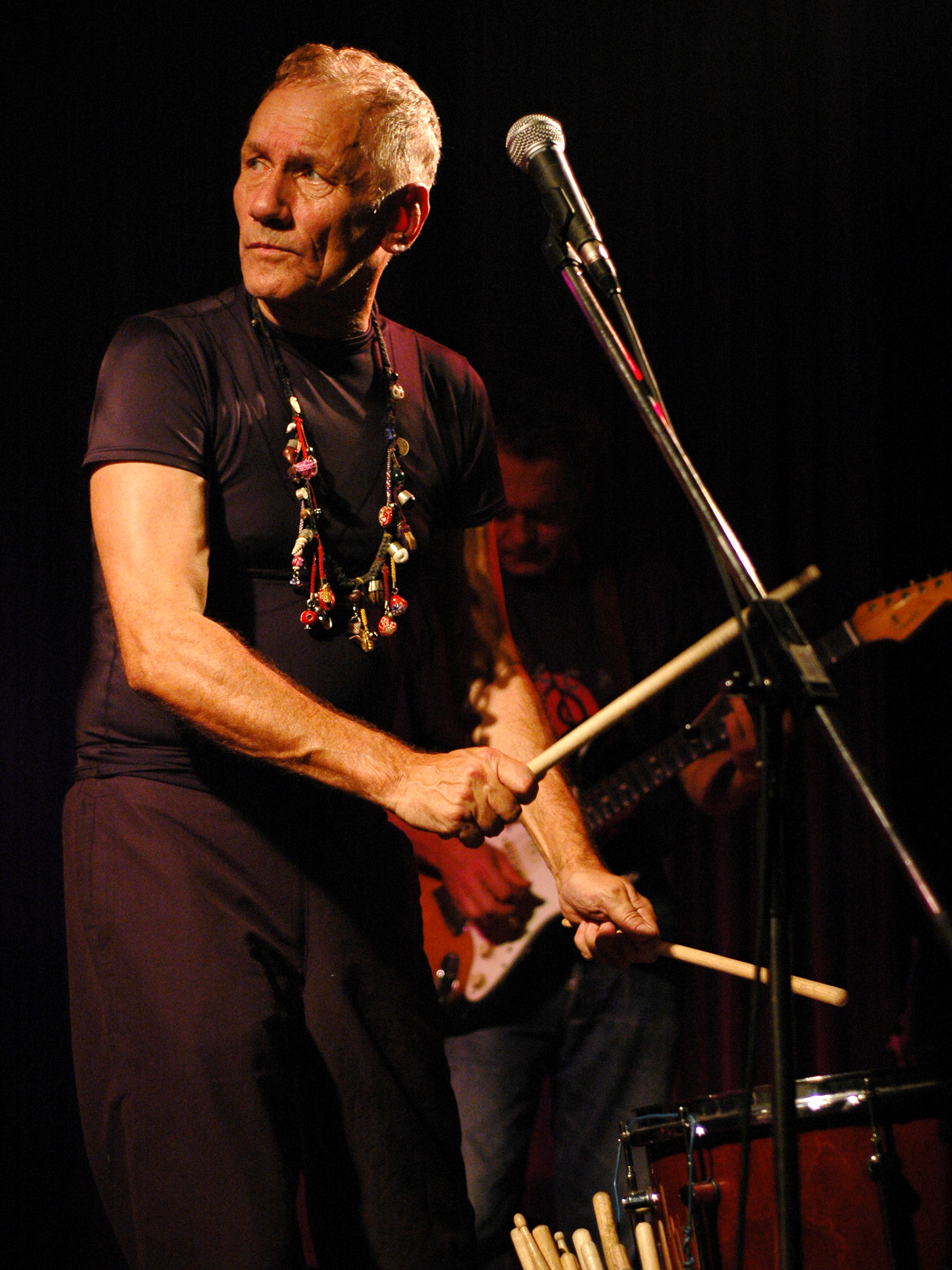
- Mani Neumeier live with his band Guru Guru (18 November 2006)

Background information
- Born: Manfred Neumeier; 31 December 1940 (age 85)
- Origin: Germany
- Genres: Krautrock; Free jazz Experimental Music
- Occupations: Musician; Drummer; Vocalist
- Instruments: drums vocals
- Website: www.mani-neumeier.de

Mani Neumeier (Manfred Neumeier, born 31 December 1940 in Munich) is a German rock musician, free-jazz drummer, artist, and frontman (singer and drummer) of the German Krautrock-band Guru Guru.

Probably best known for his work with Guru Guru, Neumeier collaborated with numerous bands and artists, such as Dieter Möbius, Damo Suzuki, Harmonia, Hans-Karsten Raecke, Irène Schweizer, Peter Brötzmann, Sonny Sharrock, Uchihashi Kazuhisa, Jojo Hiroshige, Kawabata Makoto, Yoshida Tatsuya, and Luigi Archetti. Neumeier has lived in Germany and Japan. The wax museum of Tokyo has a wax figure of him. He has also regularly collaborated with Japanese jam and noise bands Acid Mothers Temple and Hijokaidan.

== Discography ==
=== Solo ===
- 1981 Mani Neumeier
- 1983 Waldmeister (limited MC)
- 1992 Privat
- 1993 Terra Amphibia
- 1998 Terra Amphibia 2
- 2002 Birthday !
- 2005 Terra Amphibia 3 - Deep In The Jungle
- 2007 Sketches aka Mani
- 2009 Smoking The Contracts
- 2014 Talking Drums

=== With Guru Guru ===
See: Guru Guru

=== Collaborations and guest appearances ===
(Source: )

- 1967 Humair, Favre, Antolini, Neumeier, Gruntz From Sticksland With Love
- 1967 Irène Schweizer Trio Jazz Meets India
- 1967 Globe Unity Orchestra
- 1967 Irène Schweizer Trio Early Tapes
- 1967 Wolfgang Dauner Free Action
- 1975 Harmonia Deluxe
- 1975 Highdelberg
- 1982 Ensemble Yniverze Ensemble Yniverze
- 1982 Moebius, Plank, Neumeier Zero Set
- 1983 L.S. Bearforce L.S. Bearforce
- 1986 Alfred Harth Red Art
- 1989 Der Blaue Hirsch Cyberpunk
- 1989 Unknownmix Whaba
- 1992 Der Blaue Hirsch Brain Drain
- 1992 Tiere Der Nacht Hot Stuff
- 1994 Tiere Der Nacht Wolpertinger
- 1996 Cosmic Couriers Other Places
- 1996 Mani Neumeier & Peter Hollinger Monsters Of Drums
- 1997 Irène Schweizer & Mani Neumeier European Masters Of Improvisation
- 1997 Möbius, Engler, Neumeier Space Explosion
- 1997 Damo Suzuki's Network Tokyo On Air West 30-April
- 1997 Damo Suzuki's Network Tokyo On Air West 2-May
- 1997 Damo Suzuki's Network Osaka Muse Hall 4-May
- 1997 Tiere Der Nacht Evergreens
- 1998 Neumeier & Hollinger Monsters Of Drums Meets The Demons Of Bali
- 1998 Tiere Der Nacht Sleepless
- 2000 Damo Suzuki's Network Jpn Ultd 1
- 2001 Lover 303 Modern Fairytales
- 2001 Hans-Karsten Raecke & Mani Neumeier Pescanned Passages
- 2002 Achim Jaroscheck & Mani Neumeier Europlosion
- 2002 Damo Suzuki's Network Jpn Ultd 2
- 2003 Möbius + Neumeier Live In Japan
- 2003 Neumeier Genrich Schmidt Psychedelic Monsterjam
- 2005 Neumeier Genrich Schmidt Intergalactic Travel Agency
- 2006 Acid Mothers Guru Guru Psychedelic Navigator (Live Collaboration with Acid Mothers Temple)
- 2007 Möbius + Neumeier Zero Set II
- 2008 Acid Mothers Temple Festival Vol. 5 DVD (Live Collaboration with Acid Mothers Temple)
- 2010 Hans Reffert & Mani Neumeier Der Teufel und sein Guru
- 2014 Cosmic Couriers Another Other Places
- 2015 Neumeier & Miyashita Echoshock – Krautorock
- 2017 Neumeier & Goos Listen To The Rainbow
- 2018 Neumeier & Rätsch Der Atem Des Drachen
