= Dieter Moebius =

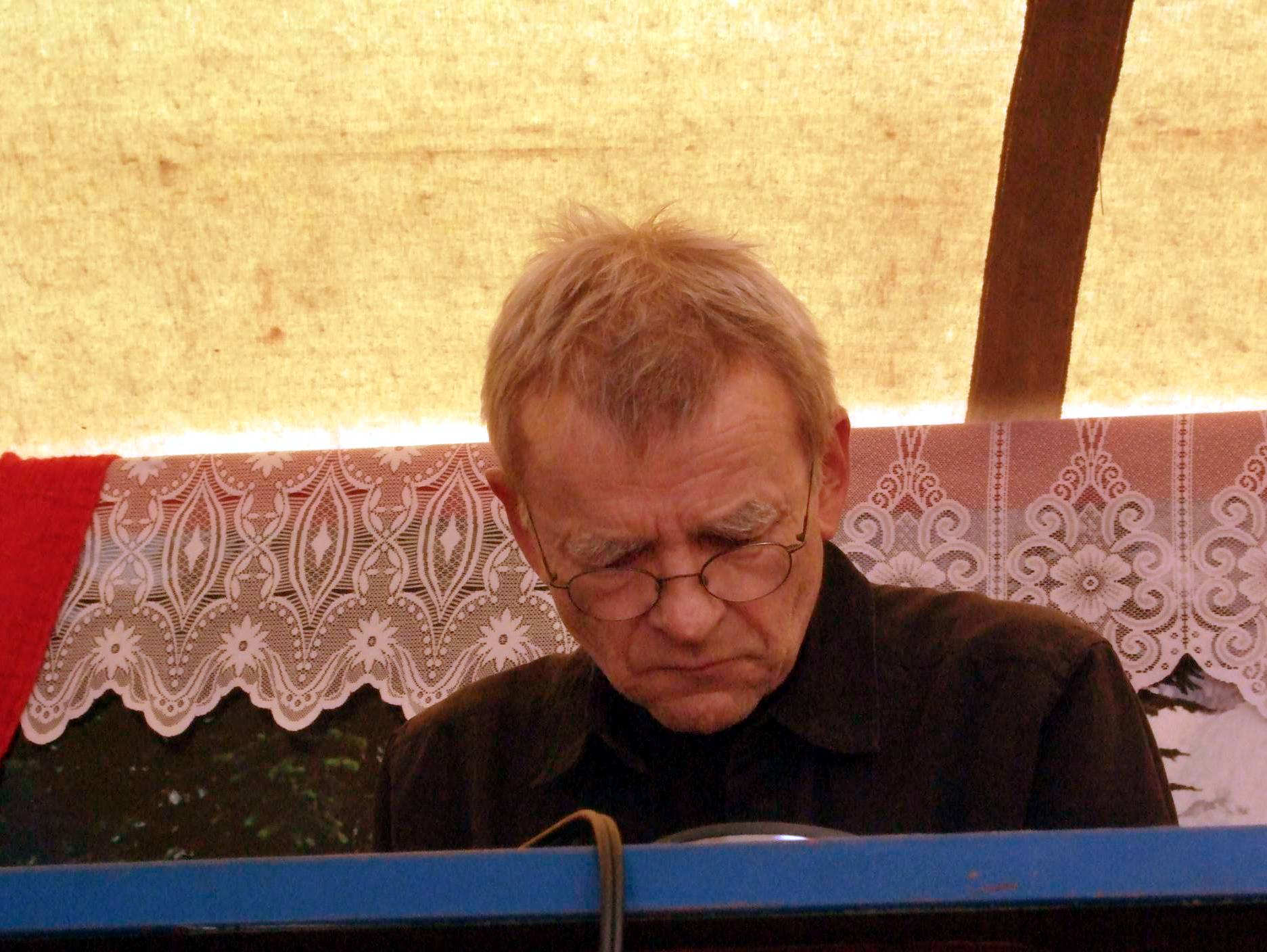
- Moebius performing in 2010

Background information
- Born: 16 January 1944; St. Gallen, Switzerland
- Died: 20 July 2015 (aged 71) Germany
- Genres: Electronic; krautrock; kosmische; ambient; experimental
- Occupation(s): Musician, producer
- Instruments: Synthesizer; keyboards; electric organ; guitar; drum machine
- Years active: 1969–2015
- Labels: Sky; Drag City; Gyroscope; Curious; Captain Trip

Dieter Moebius (16 January 1944 – 20 July 2015) was a Swiss-born German electronic musician and composer, best known as a member of the influential krautrock bands Cluster and Harmonia.

== Career ==
Moebius was studying art at Berlin's Akademie Grafik and working as a restaurant cook when he met Conrad Schnitzler, founder of the Zodiak Free Arts Lab with Hans-Joachim Roedelius. The trio founded the improv group Kluster in 1969. After the departure of Schnitzler, the duo changed their name to Cluster and relocated to the countryside village of Forst, releasing influential albums such as Zuckerzeit (1974) and Sowiesoso (1976). Moebius would also draw on his graphic design training create the cover artwork for various Cluster albums and related collaborations.

Meanwhile, Moebius and Roedelius founded the band Harmonia with Michael Rother of Neu!, releasing the albums Musik von Harmonia (1974) and Deluxe (1975). Admirer Brian Eno would subsequently collaborate with both groups. Moebius began recording solo works in the 1970s and was later involved in numerous side-projects with such musicians as Conny Plank and Mani Neumeier (Guru Guru), including the influential 1983 album Zero Set.

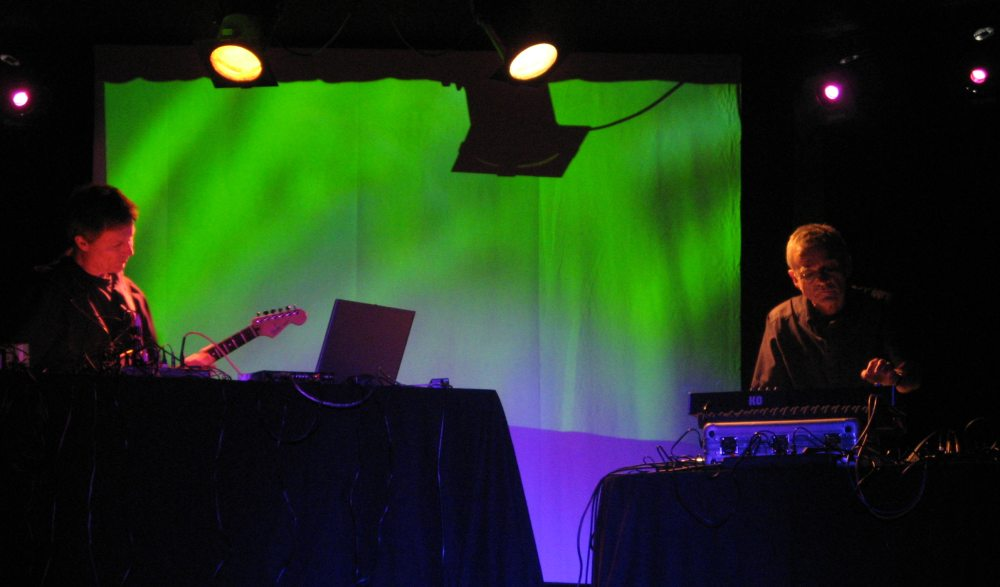
Michael Rother (left) and Moebius live in 2007

Moebius toured with Rother as Rother & Moebius in 2007. Additionally, on 27 November 2007, a Harmonia reunion concert was held in Haus der Kulturen der Welt, Berlin, where the band performed together live for the first time since 1976. He died of cancer on 20 July 2015.

== Discography ==
Solo albums and collaborations

- 1980 Rastakraut Pasta (with Conny Plank)
- 1981 Material (with Conny Plank)
- 1981 Strange Music (with Gerd Beerbohm)
- 1982 Zero Set (with Conny Plank and Mani Neumeier)
- 1983 Tonspuren
- 1983 Double Cut (with Gerd Beerbohm)
- 1986 Blue Moon (Original Soundtrack)
- 1990 Ersatz (with Karl Renziehausen)
- 1992 Ersatz II (with Karl Renziehausen)
- 1995 En Route (with Conny Plank; recorded in 1986, additional mix in 1995)
- 1998 Ludwig's Law (with Conny Plank and Mayo Thompson)
- 1999 Blotch
- 2002 Live in Japan (with Mani Neumeier)
- 2006 Nurton
- 2007 Zero Set II (with Mani Neumeier)
- 2009 Kram
- 2011 Ding
- 2012 Moebius & Tietchens (with Asmus Tietchens)
- 2014 Snowghost Pieces (Moebius, Story, Leidecker)
- 2014 Nidemonex

Posthumous albums

- 2017 Musik Für Metropolis
- 2017 Familiar (Moebius, Story, Leidecker)
- 2017 Kunsthalle Düsseldorf (Live) (12") (Moebius, Schneider)
- 2019 Objective Objects (Dieter Moebius & Dwight Ashley)
- 2023 Aspirin

As Kluster / Cluster

- See Kluster and Cluster

With Brian Eno and Hans-Joachim Roedelius

- 1977 : Cluster & Eno
- 1978 : After the Heat

As Harmonia, with Michael Rother and Hans-Joachim Roedelius

- 1973 : Musik Von Harmonia
- 1975 : Deluxe
- 1997 : Tracks and Traces (recorded 1976 with Brian Eno)
- 2007 : Live 1974

As Cosmic Couriers, with Mani Neumeier and Jürgen Engler

- 1996 : Other Places
- 2014 : Another Other Places

With Liliental

- 1978 Liliental
