= Guru Guru =

German Krautrock band

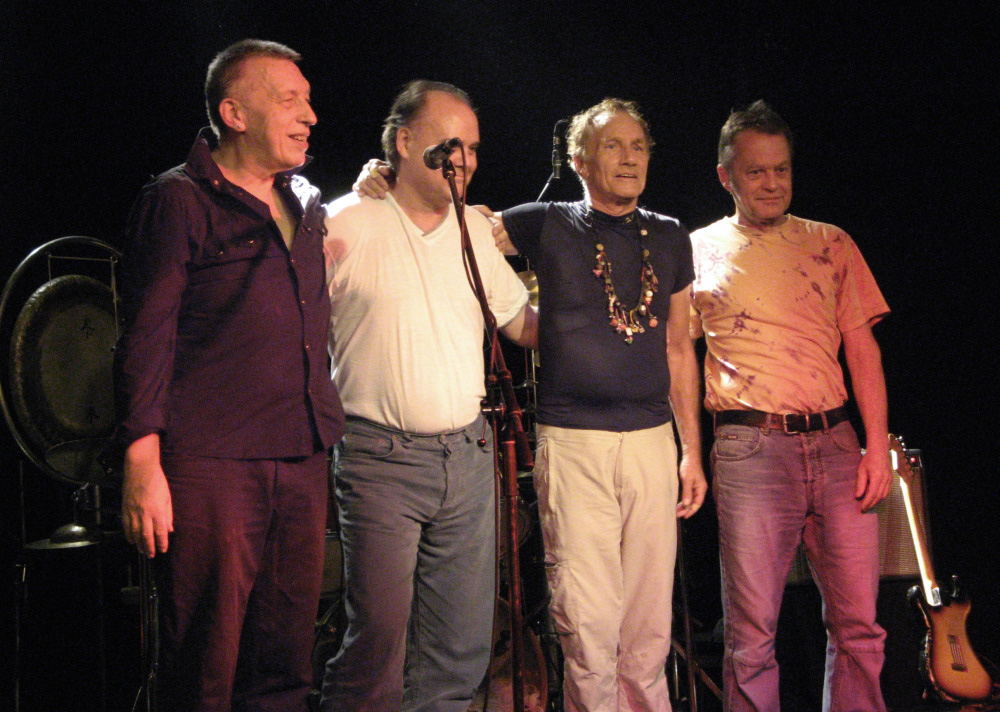
- From left: Hans Reffert, Peter Kühmstedt, Mani Neumeier, Roland Schaeffer (2007)

Background information
- Origin: Heidelberg, Germany
- Genres: Krautrock, experimental rock, psychedelic rock, progressive rock, jazz rock
- Years active: 1968–present
- Members: Mani Neumeier; Peter Kühmstedt; Roland Schaeffer; Zeus B. Held
- Past members: Hans Reffert; Uli Trepte; Eddy Naegeli; Jim Kennedy; Ax Genrich; Bruno Schaab; Conny Veit; Hans Hartmann; Houschaeng Nejadepour; Jogi Karpenkiel; Josef Jandrisits; Butze Fischer; Hellmut Hattler; Dieter Bornschlegel; Peter Wolbrandt; Erwin Ditzner; Barbara Lahr; Uli Zuefle; Razem Ruebel; Luigi Archetti; Jan Lindqvist
- Website: www.guru-guru.com

Guru Guru is a German krautrock band formed in 1968 as The Guru Guru Groove by Mani Neumeier (drums), Uli Trepte (bass) and Eddy Naegeli (guitar), later replaced by the American Jim Kennedy. After Kennedy collapsed on stage due to a serious illness, Ax Genrich replaced him to complete the classic Guru Guru line up, in time for their debut album in 1970.

== Music ==
Guru Guru were related to the free jazz music scene through their work with Swiss pianist Irène Schweizer and through Neumeier, who had already won several jazz prizes. The band was also influenced by psychedelic rock artists, such as Jimi Hendrix, Frank Zappa, The Crazy World Of Arthur Brown, Rolling Stones and early Pink Floyd.

Among the band's closest musical colleagues were Amon Düül, Can and Xhol Caravan, with whom Guru Guru played jam sessions.

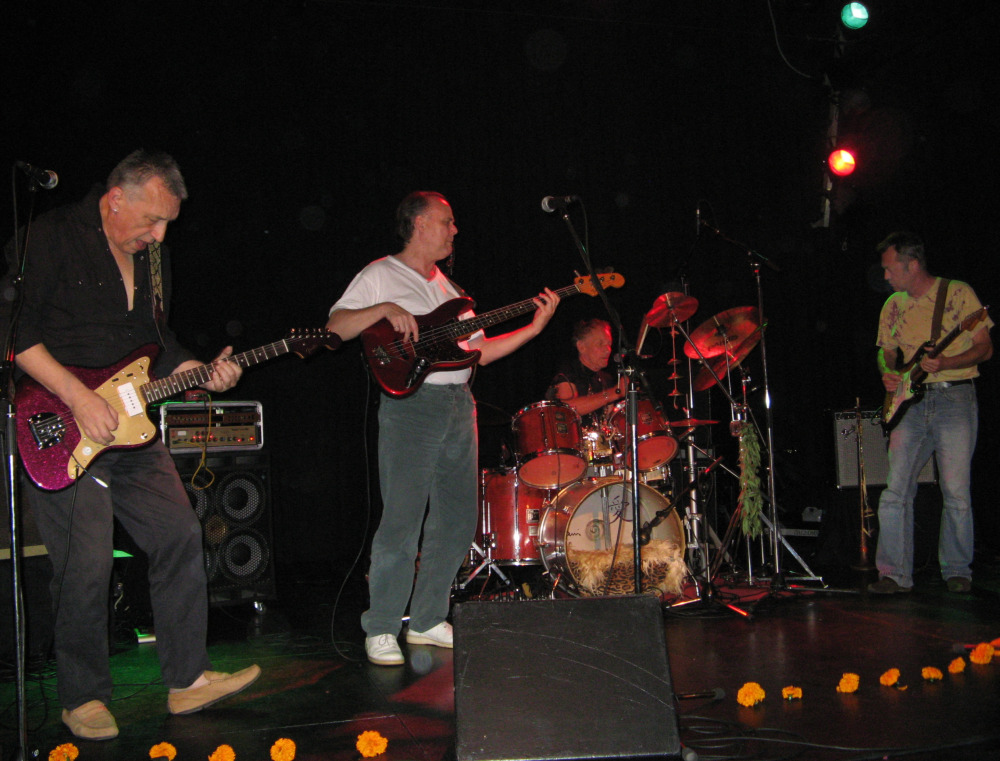
Guru Guru, live in 2007

Frontman Mani Neumeier (drummer and singer) has an original style of playing drums, and is known in the European jazz rock-scene. He was also involved in numerous other projects, including Tiere der Nacht, The Psychedelic Monsterjam, Damo Suzuki's Network, Globe Unity Orchestra, Harmonia, Acid Mothers Guru Guru, Voodootrance and Lover 303.

== Social environment ==
Guru Guru's live performances in the late 1960s and early 1970s were politically left-oriented. They organized concerts together with the Socialist German Student Union, read political texts between the songs, and sporadically gave concerts in prisons. Their shows were extravagant and anarchistic, some of the musicians lived together in a commune in the German Odenwald region, experimented with hallucinogens (one of their songs is titled "The LSD March" / German: "Der LSD-Marsch"). Mani Neumeier is one of the organizers of the annual Krautrock-Festival in Finkenbach, Oberzent.

== Publicity ==
Guru Guru has released over 40 LPs and CDs, and has sold over 500,000 records. The band has played numerous live concerts, appeared in films, radio and television. In 1976, Guru Guru was the first German band to play live on the WDR TV show Rockpalast.

== Discography ==
- 1970 UFO
- 1971 Hinten
- 1972 Känguru
- 1973 Guru Guru
- 1973 Don't Call Us, We Call You
- 1974 Dance of the Flames
- 1974 Der Elektrolurch (2 LP compilation)
- 1975 Mani und seine Freunde
- 1976 Tango Fango
- 1977 Globetrotter
- 1978 Live (2 LP)
- 1979 Hey du
- 1981 Mani in Germani
- 1983 Mani Neumeiers neue Abenteuer (a.k.a. Guru Mani ... )
- 1987 Jungle
- 1988 Guru Guru 88
- 1988 Live 72
- 1992 Shake Well – MC
- 1993 Shake Well
- 1995 Wah Wah
- 1996 Mask (limited edition)
- 1997 Moshi Moshi
- 1999 Live 98 (3-CD set, also on 2 LP)
- 2000 2000 Gurus
- 2003 Essen 1970 (live)
- 2005 In the Guru Lounge
- 2007 Wiesbaden 1972 (live)
- 2008 PSY
- 2009 Live on tour 2008
- 2009 Wiesbaden 1973 (live)
- 2011 Doublebind
- 2011 Live in Germany '71
- 2013 Electric Cats
- 2014 Live at Lido
- 2016 Acid Guru Pond (Collaboration of Bardo Pond, Guru Guru, Acid Mothers Temple members)
- 2018 Rotate!
- 2020 Live in China
- 2023 Incredible World Of Guru Guru
- 2023 Guru Guru - Live in Concert

== See also ==
- List of ambient music artists
