= Hellmut Hattler =

German bassist and composer

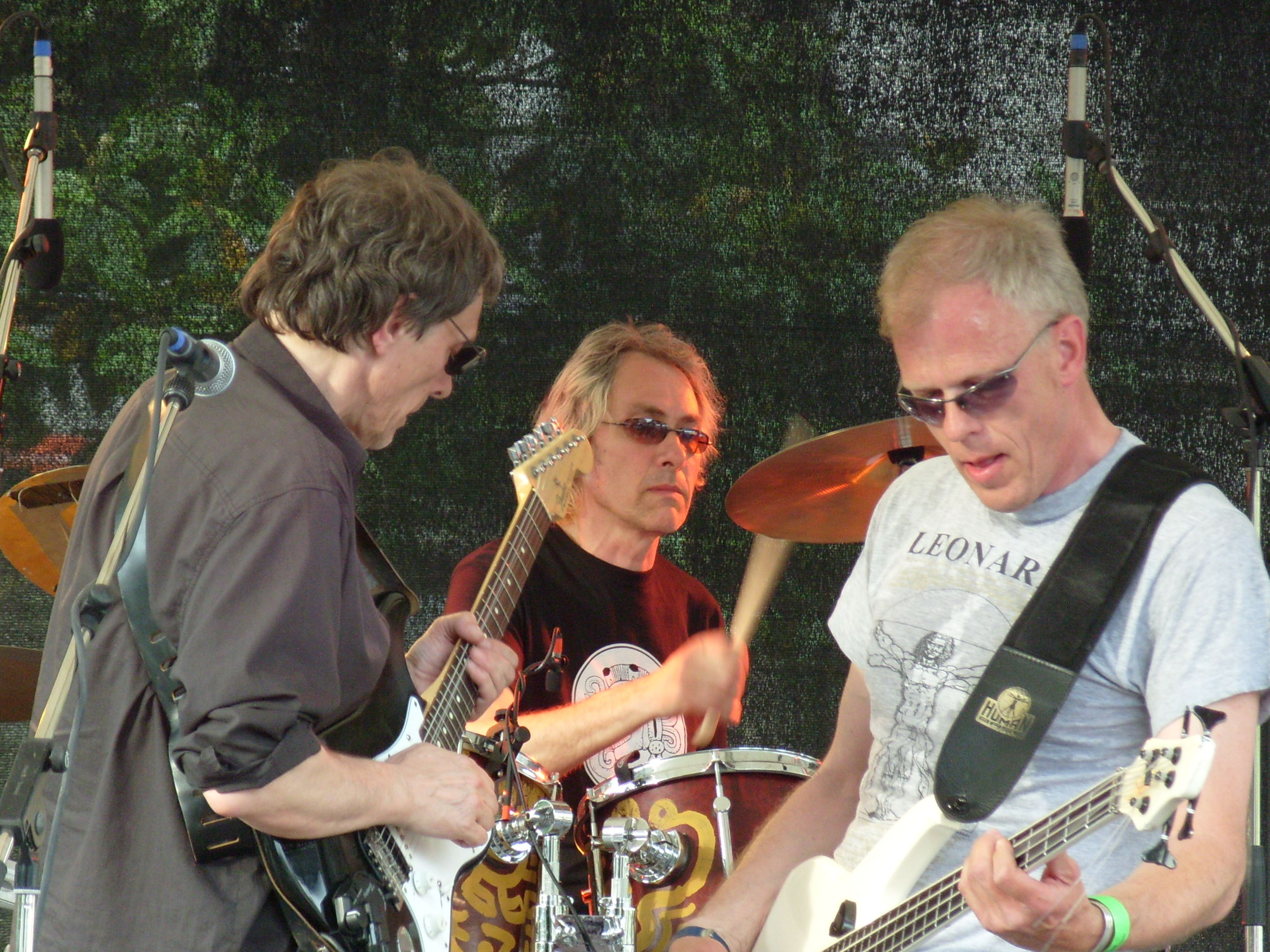
- Hellmut Hattler (on the right) with Kraan 2008

Background information
- Born: 12 April 1952 (age 74); Ulm, West Germany
- Instrument: Bass guitar
- Website: www.hellmut-hattler.de

Hellmut Hattler (born 12 April 1952 in Ulm, West Germany) is a German jazz and rock bassist and composer. Hattler took much of his early influences from Jimi Hendrix. As a child, he received violin lessons, and in the 1960s, he played guitar. Joining Peter Wolbrandt's band marked the debut of his changeover to the bass. In May 1971, he founded the group Kraan with the Wolbrandt brothers Peter and Jan and Johannes Pappert. Kraan's early Krautrock style later developed towards fusion, combining rock, jazz and ethnic elements. Apart from his own projects, Hattler has toured and recorded with many international musicians of various genres including Tina Turner, Billy Cobham, Joachim Kühn, Torsten de Winkel, Alphonse Mouzon, and Nippy Noya.

== Projects ==
=== Kraan ===
When asked about the meaning of the band name he explained "It sounds good because it starts hard and aggressive and finishes softly." This duality, seen from a musical perspective would become the trademark of Hattler and his various projects. His music appealed not only to the groove receptive audiences but also to pure music fans. For the first, he delivers highly dancable grooves, while for the others he simply became the German bassist. After six albums and hundreds of concerts with Kraan, with the support of an all-star team of German musicians, he published Bassball, his first solo album. During its formative years the members of the band lived together for economy. Although the first plans to disband began after seven years, in 1978 Kraan published Flyday which was critically acclaimed as one of the best recordings of their career. Three further albums followed and in 1983 the band was finally dissolved.

Towards the end of the 1980s they reformed for several more years with trumpeter Joo Kraus taking over the keyboards from Ingo Bischof. In the summer of 2000 they made a highly successful comeback, first in Ulm, followed by the Burg Herzberg Festival with Peter Wolbrandt, Jan Fride Wolbrandt, Hellmut Hattler and Ingo Bischof in the line-up. In 2001 Hattler celebrated his 30 years on the stage and published a new CD Live 2000. The band continues to record and play live concerts.

=== Tab Two ===
After a short period as guest bassist with the group Fehlfarben, Hattler met trumpeter Joo Kraus from Ulm. Together with guitarist Torsten de Winkel, who can be heard on all Tab Two albums, the CD deWinkelHattler – Humanimal Talk was produced. After de Winkel moved to the US to work, among others, with the Pat Metheny Group, Hattler and Kraus recorded their first CD as a duo, Mind Movie, in 1991. From their early attempts to combine jazz and Hip-Hop, over their seven highly successful studio albums, they became the pioneers of German Acid and NuJazz. Flagman Ahead became a long-lasting hit on American radio stations, and the duo produced music for Tina Turner. After many world-wide tours, the duo went their separate ways.

End of 2011 the musicians announced a "temporary reunion" with a tour limited to about 10 concerts, and the release of the 3CD best-of album "Two Thumbs Up" end of April 2012. On 12 April 2012, at a festival on occasion of Hellmut Hattler's 60th birthday, Tab Two performed for the first time since 1999. The recordings were released as MP3 EP "Live at the Roxy". Seven tracks recorded during the tour are now available as a bonus CD of the album "...zzzipp! extended", released in April 2013. In 2013 they played two concerts as Tab Two & Friends, with former guest singer Sandie Wollasch again, and for the first time with a real band, Oli Rubow on drums and Ralf Schmid on keyboards.

=== Hattler ===
Inspired by young electronic musicians, Hattler initiated his self-titled project 'HATTLER', setting new impulses with the No Eats Yes album. Recorded with the assistance of long-time partners like Torsten de Winkel, and Joo Kraus, the album was awarded the German ECHO Award for 2001's best jazz production. With his participation in the project Deep Dive Corp., Hattler delved deeper into the electronic music field and contributed to various albums from 2000 to 2006. Since 2006, HATTLER records and tours in its current line up with Fola Dada, Torsten de Winkel and Oli Rubow (CDs The Big Flow, Live Cuts, Gotham City Beach Club Suite, The Kite, Live Cuts II and Warhol Holidays). In 2001, Hattler founded the Bassball Recordings label.

Hattler has published two bass books: the Hip Bass school in which he demonstrates his plectrum technique, and the Hellmut Hattler Songbook, of chords and scores from his 'Hattler' project.

Hattler's son Max Hattler is a film maker.

=== Siyou'n'Hell ===
Since 2009 Hattler is on tour with 'Siyou'n'Hell', an energetic duo with gospel singer Siyou. 'Hell' stands for the short form of his first name Hellmut. They released two albums so far. At some concerts they are joined by additional musicians, mostly in the second half of the show.

== Hattler about himself ==
In 1971 Hattler said "We don't have any regular jobs in this society. We concentrate entirely on the music. In this situation we try to make music that separates us from the pop clichés. We strive towards a closed musical experience that touches on all areas of our lives. We follow no one else - we make our own music."

== Books ==
- Hip Bass 1995, AMA-Verlag, ISBN 978-3-927190-34-4
- Hellmut Hattler Songbook 2009, Bosworth Music, ISBN 978-3-86543-434-0

== Discography ==
=== With Kraan ===
- Kraan (1972)
- Wintrup (1973)
- Andy Nogger (1974)
- Live (1975)
- Let It Out (1976)
- Wiederhören (1977)
- Flyday (1979)
- Tournee (1980)
- Nachtfahrt (1982)
- Kraan "X" (1983)
- Live 88 (1988)
- Dancing In The Shade (1989)
- Soul Of Stone (1991)
- Live 2001 (2001)
- Berliner Ring (2002)
- Through (2003)
- Psychedelic Man (2007)
- Diamonds (2011)
- The Trio Years (2018)
- The Trio Years - Zugabe! (2019)
- Sandglass (2020)

=== With Liliental ===
- Liliental (1978)

=== With Tab Two ===
- Mind Movie (1991)
- Space Case (1992)
- Hip Jazz (1994)
- Flagman Ahead (1995)
- Belle Affaire (1996)
- Sonic Tools(1997)
- Between Us (1999)
- ...zzzipp! (2000)
- Live at the Roxy (2012, download-only)
- Two Thumbs Up (2012)
- ...zzzipp! extended (2013)

=== Solo ===
- Bassball (1978)
- Bassball II (2017)

=== HATTLER ===
- No Eats Yes (2000)
- Remixed Vocal Cuts (2002)
- Mallberry Moon (2003)
- Bass Cuts (2004)
- Surround Cuts (2005, DVD Video)
- The Big Flow (2006)
- Live Cuts (2007)
- Gotham City Beach Club Suite (2010)
- The Kite (2013)
- Live in Glems (2013, MP3)
- Live Cuts II (2014)
- Vinyl Cuts (2015)
- Warhol Holidays (2016)
- Vinyl Cuts 2 (2018)
- Velocity (2018)
- Vinyl Cuts 3 (2019)
- Sundae (2021)

=== With Siyou'n'Hell ===
- Siyou meets Hellmut Hattler (2010)
- two2one (2012)
- Soulscape Screenshots (2015)

=== With Ali Neander ===
- Ali Neander featuring Hellmut Hattler (2010)
- This One Goes To Eleven (2014)

=== With Torsten de Winkel ===
- Mastertouch with Michael Brecker, Kai Eckhardt, Billy Cobham, Joachim Kühn, Ernie Watts, Alphonse Mouzon, and Nippy Noya (1985)
- deWinkelHattler - Humanimal Talk with Naná Vasconcelos, Joo Kraus, Kai Eckhardt, and Joel Rosenblatt (1989)
