= Hattler =

Hattler is a surname and may refer to:

- Christina Hattler, American fashion designer
- Hellmut Hattler (born 1952), German jazz and bass player
- Max Hattler, German video artist and experimental filmmaker
