= Kraan Live =

Live

Live album by Kraan
- Released: 1975
- Recorded: October 19–20, 1974
- Venue: Quartier Latin (Berlin)
- Genre: Jazz rock
- Length: 77:50
- Label: Spiegelei
- Producer: Kraan

Kraan chronology
Andy Nogger (1974)	Live (1975)	Let It Out (1975)

Professional ratings
Review scores
Source	Rating
Allmusic	4.5/5 stars

Live is the first Live album by the German Jazz rock band Kraan. The album was recorded at Quartier Latin in Berlin in October 1974.

== Track listing ==
=== Side one ===
1. "Jerk Of Life" – 5:09
2. "Nam Nam" – 15:09

=== Side two ===
1. "Holiday am Marterhorn including Gipfelsturm" – 12:59
2. "Sarah's Ritt durch den Schwarzwald"– 6:00

=== Síde three ===
1. "Andy Nogger" – 3:30
2. "Andy Nogger - Gutter King" – 6:59
3. "Hallo Ja Ja, I Don't Know" – 10:18

=== Side four ===
1. "Lonesome Liftboy" – 5:12
2. "Kraan Arabia" – 12:30

== Personnel ==
- Peter Wolbrandt - guitar, vocals
- Jan Fride - drums, percussion
- Hellmut Hattler - bass, vocals
- Johannes Pappert - saxophone
