= Two Thumbs Up =

Two Thumbs Up may refer to:

- "Two Thumbs Up", a catchphrase used by the film critic duo Siskel and Ebert and a trademark owned by their families
  - At the Movies (1986 TV program) (previously Siskel & Ebert and Ebert & Roeper), a TV series on which the phrase was frequently used
- Two Thumbs Up (film), a Cantonese film 2015
- Two Thumbs Up, a compilation album by German acid group Tab Two

== See also ==
- "Five Stars and Two Thumbs Up", a song by Danielson from the 2006 album Ships
- Two Thumbs Down (disambiguation)
- Thumbs Up (disambiguation)
