= Palatia jazz =

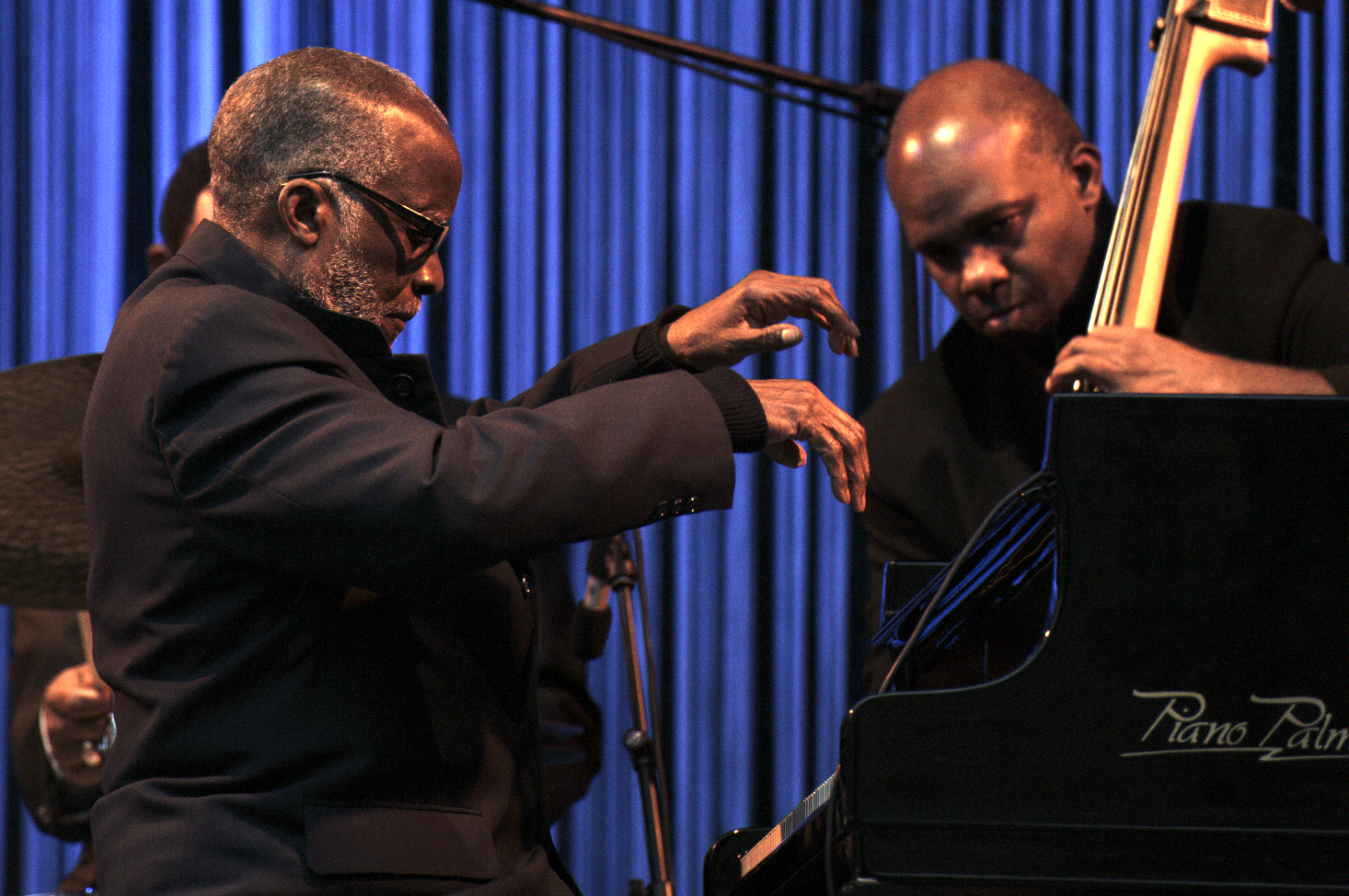
Ahmad Jamal at the 2011 Palatia Jazz Festival

Palatia jazz is a jazz festival in Rhineland-Palatinate, Germany. It has been held annually in August since 1997. The concerts take place at castles, churches, monasteries and historic parks near Kaiserslautern, Heidelberg and Mannheim in the Palatinate of southwestern Germany.

Palatia jazz has attracted musicians such as Manu Katché, David Sanborn, Incognito, Tab Two, Klaus Doldinger, Paul Kuhn Trio, Ahmad Jamal, Nils Landgren, Al Di Meola, Joo Kraus, DePhazz, Jazzkantine, Barbara Hendricks, Cornelius Claudio Kreusch, Till Brönner, Nigel Kennedy, Quadro Nuevo, Chick Corea, NoJazz, Joachim Kühn, Maria João, Tania Maria, Branford Marsalis, Cassandra Wilson, Joshua Redman, Silje Nergaard, Peter Herbolzheimer, Albert Mangelsdorff, Mal Waldron, Joe Zawinul and Herbie Mann.
