= Oytun Ersan =

Turkish Cypriot bass guitarist and composer

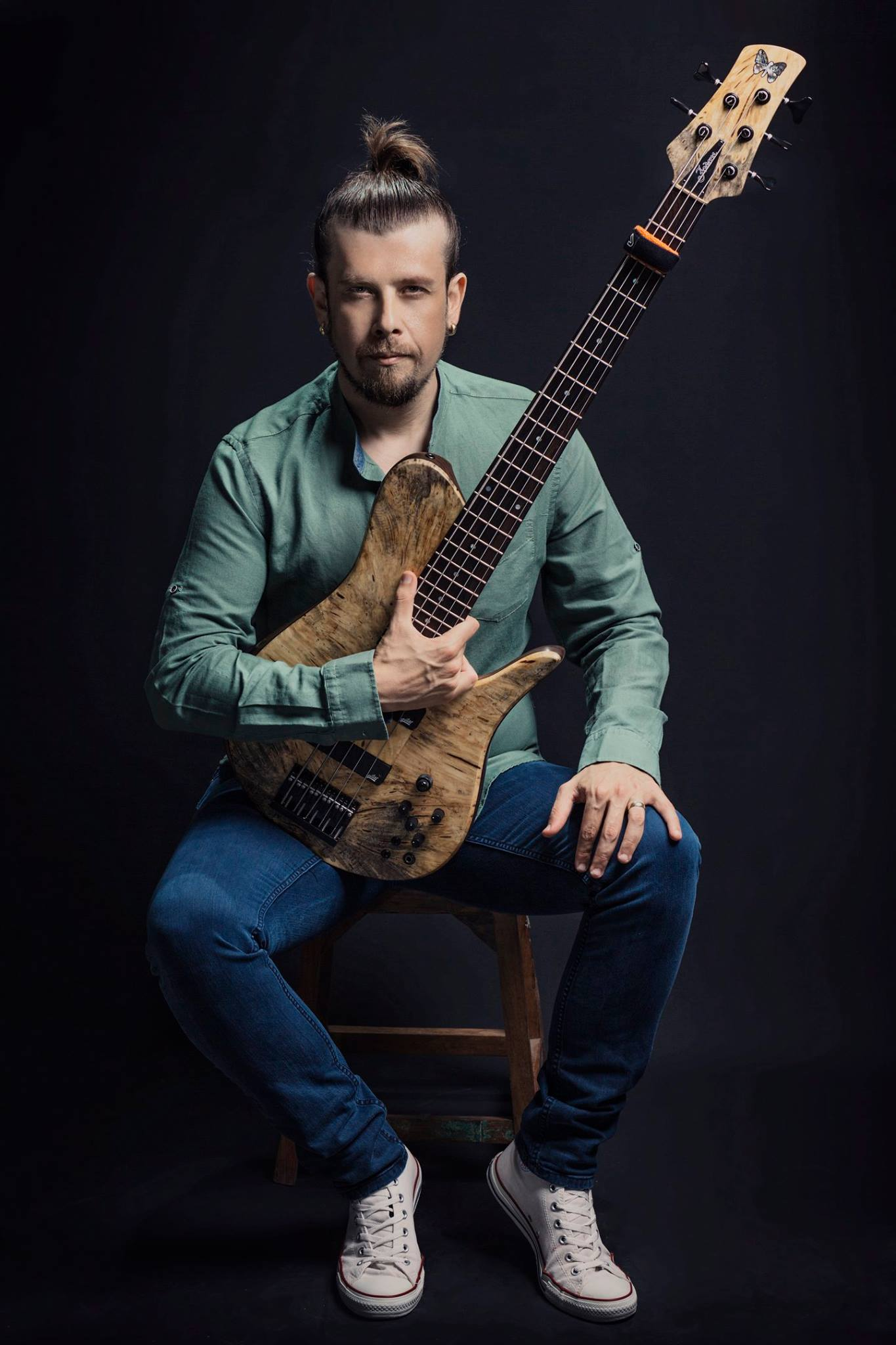

Background information
- Born: 22 June 1978 (age 48); Nicosia, Cyprus
- Genre: Jazz fusion
- Occupation: Musician
- Instrument: Bass guitar
- Years active: 2002–present
- Website: oytunersan.com

Oytun Ersan (born June 22, 1978) is a Turkish Cypriot bass guitarist and composer. He has worked and collaborated with a range of acclaimed artists including Dave Weckl, Eric Marienthal, Simon Phillips, Gary Husband, Mitchel Forman, Mike Miller, Brett Garsed, Dean Brown, Okan Ersan, Karen Briggs, Cliff Almond, Wycliffe Gordon, Ola Onabule, Louie Palmer and Bob Franceschini. In May 2015, he released his album East Meets West. His second album Fusiolicious was released on 4 April 2018 featuring Dave Weckl, Eric Marienthal, Gary Husband, Gerry Etkins, Dean Brown, Mike Miller, Brett Garsed, Karen Briggs. The album was produced, mixed, and mastered by Ric Fierabracci. Ersan performed at various international festivals, venues and events to date, including Leverkusener Jazztage, Allener Jazzfest, Ingolstädter Jazztage, Nublu Jazz Club, Baked Potato Jazz Club and the Bass Bash.

Oytun Ersan is among the Featured Artists of Fodera Guitars and an official artist endorser for Aguilar Amplification and GruvGear.

== Early life and education ==
Ersan joined the Nicosia Municipal Orchestra at the age of 15. He studied Music at the Eastern Mediterranean University. He then gained his MA degree in Special Education from the Near East University in North Cyprus. He completed the Instrumental Conducting Course Masterclass run by Peter Stark from the Royal College of Music in July 2014.

== Discography ==
- East Meets West (2015)
- Fusiolicious (2018)
- Fusiolicious II: Now We're Talking Funk (2021)
- Fusiolicious II: Groove in the Hole (2022)
