= Patatap =

Visual sound software

- Original author: Jono Brandel
- Developer: Jono Brandel
- Initial release: March 25, 2014; 11 years ago
- Platform: Browser, iOS
- Website: patatap.com

Patatap is a visual sound kit application with animations by computer programmer Jono Brandel and Japanese electronic duo Lullatone, consisting of Shawn James Seymour and Yoshimi Tomida.

== Summary ==
Patatap consists of unique palettes of colors, sounds, and shapes that are altered via the spacebar. The 26 melodic and rhythmic sounds that are in each set are triggered by pressing the A to Z keys. All of the sounds present a visual animation over the background when played. A writer for Co.design described the audio textures as ranging from "bells and snaps to pew-pewing lasers and alien spaceship landings."

== Development ==
Jono Brandel had been experimenting with animations serving as visuals for music "over the last couple of years," he said in a 2014 interview. In October 2013, he got in touch with the Japanese duo Lullatone who conceived of making a musical instrument application that was based on visualizing music. As Brandel described the intentions of making Patatap, "we [were] interested in the mixing of aural and visual senses, and wanted to bring that to a format that anyone can enjoy."

In order to develop an instrument where a user with no musical abilities could create a song, Lullatone made sure all the sounds weren't "muddy if someone pressed too many buttons at once." The duo initially made a set consisting of more melodic notes than percussion hits, but they figured out that "too many melodic elements made it hard to create tracks with room to breathe." Thus, the final set of sounds consisted of an equal amount of thirteen melodic sounds and thirteen rhythmic sounds. As Lullatone's Shawn James Seymour explained, "We just chose sounds for each set that we thought would work well together to make a song with a few random dudes thrown it to give it some spice!"

== Release and reception ==
Before its official release, Patatap was featured at the Monarch bar in San Francisco in 2012 and Gray Area's Creative Code program in 2013. Later on, Brandel and Lullatone presented the program at several conventions, such as the eighteenth Japan Media Arts Festival in 2014, Ableton's 2015 Loop convention in Berlin, The Tech Museum of Innovation in 2014, Rhizomatiks' 2014 "Super Flying Tokyo" event, and the Punto y Raya Festival. The app was released officially online on March 25, 2014 and on the iPhone OS on June 6, 2014.

Publications honored the application as "addictive," "only the very best in procrastination," "the most fun you'll ever have with your computer keyboard," and "delightful as the first time you banged on some piano keys or clanged on pots and pans and discovered: Hey, I can make noise!" Refinery29 journalist Colleen Nika stated that the charm of Patatap was that it "takes a familiar conundrum — being supremely bored in front of your computer — and saves you from backsliding into the rabbit hole of wonky cat gifs and "Which Lindsay Lohan Are You?" quizzes. Instead, it encourages you to open your browser, get free-associative, and create something." She also called it superior to other digital audio workstations: "Unlike with actual music software, there's no UI logistics or performance pressure to grapple with — it's a foolproof self-destructing sketchpad for whimsical kicks alone."
