= Flyday =

Studio album by Kraan
- Released: 1978
- Recorded: July – September 1978; Engineer: Dave Hutchins
- Studio: Conny's Studio
- Genre: Jazz rock
- Length: 37:07
- Label: Harvest
- Producer: Kraan and Conny Plank

Kraan chronology
Wiederhören (1977)	Flyday (1978)	Tournee (1980)

Professional ratings
Review scores
Source	Rating
Allmusic	4/5 stars

Flyday is the seventh album by the German jazz rock band Kraan.

== Track listing ==
All songs composed by Helmut Hattler and Peter Wolbrandt.

=== Side one ===
1. "Far West" – 2:31
2. "My Brother Said" – 3:42
3. "Ausflug" – 7:15
4. "Gayu Gaya" – 5:05

=== Side two ===
1. "You're Right" – 5:59
2. "Young King's Song" – 5:36
3. "Buy Buy" – 3:37
4. "Flyday" – 3:19

== Personnel ==
- Peter Wolbrandt – Guitars, vocals, strings, percussions
- Hellmut Hattler – Bass, vocals, percussion
- Ingo Bischof – Moogs
- Udo Dahmen – Drums
