= Ingolstädter Jazztage =

Jazz festival in Germany

Ingolstädter Jazztage is a jazz festival in Germany.

Year	Artists
1984–1995	Ray Charles, Betty Carter, Miles Davis, Fats Domino, Lionel Hampton, Stanley Jordan, Taj Mahal, Maceo Parker, Maynard Ferguson, Airto Moreira, Eddie Palmieri, Mike Mainieri & Steps Ahead, Ray Brown, Klaus Doldinger's Passport, Percussion Academia
30.10.1996–13.11.1996	Al Jarreau & Group, Youssou N'Dour & The Jololi Review feat. Cheikh Lô, Jan Garbarek Group, Mari Boine Group, Steve Coleman & Five Elements, Joe Zawinul's Syndicate, Joseph Bowie's Defunkt, Marc Copland Quartet feat. Randy Brecker, Ray Anderson’s Alligatory Band, David Tronzo, Holly Cole & Band, Larry Garner Blues Band, Swinging Ladies, Black Voices, Inga Rumpf & Joja Wendt Quartet, Kathy Kornprobst & Ina Kohlschowsky, Modern String Quartet, Free Beer & Chicken Blues Company, B.B. & The Blues Shacks, Tonic Strings, Sigi Finkel's Powerstation, Matalex, Charly Böck & Kontrabanda, Rainer Hasenkopf & Pocatello, Rudi Trögl & Friends, Sigi Schwab, Clarino Jazzband, Rudi Trögl (Jazzförderpreis – Gitarre)
31.10.1997–12.11.1997	Herbie Hancock & Wayne Shorter „1 + 1“, Michel Petrucciani Septet, Al Di Meola Project, Aziza Mustafa Zadeh, Jazzkantine, Candy Dulfer & Funky Stuff, Dianne Reeves & Band, Zap Mama, Nguyên Lê Trio, Vernon Reid „My Science“ Project, Gemini Gemini (Tacuma, Puschnig), Nils Landgren „Funk Unit“, Pee Wee Ellis Assembly, Eddy Clearwater Blues Band, Spanish Fly, Veda Hille & Her Smokin' Combo, Moscow Art Trio, Stephan Holstein Acoustic Trio, String Thing, Angela Brown Blues Band, Häns'che Weiss Duo, Friend'n Fellow, Christoph Spendel, Krzysztof Scierànski, Olaf Kübler, Oliver Mochmann, Kurt Bilker, Michal Dabrówka, Green, Coloured Mind, J.A.W. – The Hörmann/Böck Fusion Project, Timo Verbole (Jazzförderpreis – Saxophon)
31.10.1998–11.11.1998	Randy Crawford & Band, David Sanborn & Band, Lee Ritenour Group, Tania Maria Quartet, John Lurie & The Lounge Lizards, Ladysmith Black Mamabazo, Abbey Lincoln Quartet, John Scofield Group, Trilok Gurtu „The Glimpse“, Chucho Valdés Quartet, The Big Swing, Caecilie Norby & Band, Ray Gaskins, Dissidenten, Barbara Dennerlein & Bebab, Till Brönners Ballad Joint, Richard S. & Vibe Tribe, Sydney Ellis and Her Yes Mama Band, Cristina Marques & Gilson De Assis, Christoph Spendel, Michael Sagmeister, Christian Diener, Kol Simcha, Quique Sinesi + Marcelo Moguilevsky, Steps Of Spirit, Blue Note, Florian Helming Quartet, Stephan Holstein, Albert C. Humphrey, Oliver Mochmann (Jazzförderpreis – Gitarre)
31.10.1999–10.11.1999	Branford Marsalis Quartet, Juan De Marco Gonzalez & The Afro Cuban All Stars, Joshua Redman Group, John Patitucci & Band, Melissa Walker Band, Ray Anderson's Pocket Brass Band, Lester Bowie's Brass Fantasy, Nils Landgren Funk Unit, Jonas Hellborg Trio, The Kinsey Report, Smitty Dee's Original New Orleans Brass Band, Terje Rypdal & Ketil Bjornstad, Dieter Ilg Fieldwork, Oscar Klein Jazz Show feat. Charly Antolini, Tommy Schnellers Extravaganza feat. Johnny Rogers, Sammy Vomacka Trio, Tata Dindin, Pim Toscani's Dixieland All Stars, Christoph Spendel, Steve Hooks, Christian Diener, Charly Böck, Carola Grey, Oliver Rudi Trögl Trio, Florian Schmidt's True Geminis, Jörg Widmoser & Hajo Hoffmann, Oscar Klein Duo, Charly Leimer (Jazzförderpreis – Keyboards)
28.10.2000–08.11.2000	James Brown, Dee Dee Bridgewater Trio, Holly Cole & Band, Fourplay, Maceo Parker, Klaus Doldinger's Passport, Mike Stern Trio, Karizma, Doop Troop, Terence Blanchard, Irvin Mayfield Quartet, James Andrew's Brass Band, Alain Caron, Rick Vito & the Lucky Devils, Martin Schmitt & Stephan Holstein, Al Copley & Band, Park Stickney, Joja Wendt & Sydney Ellis, Ingolstädter All-Star Band, 4 of a Kind, Christoph Spendel, Charly Böck, Oliver Mochmann, Charly Leimer, Kenny Martin, Derrick James, Ingolstädter Big Band feat. Josef Spreng, Josef Spreng (Jazzförderpreis)
03.11.2001–14.11.2001	The Supremes, The Temptations feat. Damon Harris, Ellis Marsalis Quartet feat. Delfaeyo Marsalis, Old Friends feat. Klaus Doldinger, Albert Mangelsdorff, Eberhard Weber, Wolfgang Dauner, Manfred Schoof, Ralf Hübner, Ray Charles, Astral Project, Joe Krown Organ Combo, Andy Summers Trio feat. Darryl Jones & Dennis Chambers, Nils Petter Molvær & Group, Manu Dibango, Funky Brotherhood, Victor Bailey Group feat. Poogie Bell, Jim Beard, Bennie Maupin, The Pete York All Star Jazzband „The Tribute to Louis Armstrong“ feat. Liza Shaw, Roy Williams, Bruce Adams, Martin Schrack, Pascal, Michaux, Rocky Knauer, Patrice Fisher & Betsy Braud, Donald Harrison, Larry Garner & Band, Jeanne & Karen Carroll & Band, The James Andrews Band feat. Trombone Shorty, Kim Prevost & Bill Solley, Tomasz Stanko Quartet, Delfaeyo Marsalis, Leon Anderson, James Andrews, Larry Sieberth, Charly Leimer, Charly Böck, Chris Lachotta (Jazzförderpreis – Bass), Yogo Pausch, Günther Brodmann, Matthias Rosenbauer, The Funny Valentines, Christian Wondra Quartet
07.11.2002–13.11.2002	Kool & The Gang, Da Univerzal Playaz feat. Dave Stewart, Jimmy Cliff, Candy Dulfer, Gary „Mudbone“ Cooper, Jan Garbarek Group, Pharoah Sanders Group fest. Jean-Paul Bourelly, Jazz Crusaders, Robben Ford & Blue Line, Tuba Tuba feat. Michel Godard, Dave Bargeron, Joe Barbato, Kenwood Dennard, Cornelius Claudio Kreusch & Fo Doumbé, Donald Harrison Jr. & Group, Evan Christophers Clarinet Road, Rebekka Bakken & Wolfgang Muthspiel Duo, Klaus Doldinger's Passport RMX Vol. 1 feat. Joo Kraus, DJ Mutamassik, DJ Michael Sauer, Richard Leo Johnson, Geoff Goodman Quartet, Torsten de Winkel/ Hellmut Hattler Humanimal Talk, Vince Weber & Michael Maass, Doc Houlind & his New Orleans All Stars of Denmark, Lyambiko, Sharon Martin feat. Lawrence Sieberth & Charly Böck, Olaf Kübler Quartet feat. Christoph Spendel, Benno Sattler & André Nendza, Abaji, Helmut Nieberle/ Bob Rückerl Quartet, Chris Lachotta, Krzysztof Scieranski, Bernard Masseli, Marek Napiorkowski, Ricky Sebastian, Wendell Brunious, Wessell Anderson, Krzysztof Zawadzkie, Rudi Trögl Trio feat. Florian Helming, Nick Flade Trio feat. Dana Milicic, Christian Wondra (Jazzförderpreis – Piano)
07.11.2003–12.11.2003	Dee Dee Bridgewater, Kraan, Jocelyn B. Smith, Squad Cordes Sauvages, Larry Sieberth, Charly Böck, Chris Lachotta, Torsten de Winkel, Benno Sattler, Joo Kraus, Bon Rückerl, Mino Cinelu – Glen Moore – Theodosii Spassov Trio, Soulounge feat. Teddy Richards, Trio Töykeät, Anna Maria Jopek, Beady Belle, Richard Bona, Marcus Miller, The Drum Smiles feat. Charly Böck, Tom Diewock Quartet „Blue room four…“, Florian Schmidt (Jazzförderpreis – Bass)
28.10.2004–10.11.2004	Al Jarreau, Michael Schenker Group, The Jackson Singers, Soulounge, Twin Dragons, Jahcoustix & Dubios Neighbourhood, Ludwig Seuss Zydeco Band, Irith Gabriely Duo, B. Medeiros & M. Sagmeister, „3“ feat. Inga Lühning, Brice Miller Band, Lyn Leon & Band, Moscow Art Trio, Jasper van’t Hof’s Pili-Pili, Silje Nergaard & Band, Masha Bijlsma Band, Joel Harrison & Band, Mezzoforte, Mike Stern feat. Richard Bona, Dennis Chambers, Nils Landgren & Funk Unit, san2 & HIS SOUL PATROL, Carlito’s Latin Jam Band, Tom Diewock (Jazzförderpreis – Schlagzeug)
23.10.2005–09.11.2005	José Feliciano & Band, Gentleman & The Far East Band, Big Mama & The Golden Six Gospel & Spiritual Night, Victor Bailey Group, Nike Flade, Annette Marquard & Christoph Spendel, Joo Kraus Basic Jazz Lounge, The Jim Kahr Band, HeadCornerstone, Rudy Linka Trio, Shurano, Hans Reidel & His New Orleans Joymakers feat. Melanie Bong, Tower of Power, Willem Breuker Kollektief, Manu Katché Band, James Carter, World Saxophone Quartet, Anna Maria Jopek, Birdland Dixie Band, Jazziz, The Jazz Award in Concert
22.10.2006–08.11.2006	The Manhattan Transfer, Take 6, Christian Diener (Jazzförderpreis – Bass), Mike Stern Band, Quadro Nuevo, Solveig Slettahjell Slow Motion Quintet, Soulounge, Meshell Ndegeocello feat. „A Different Girl (Every Night)“, Till Brönner & Band, Al Di Meola Project, Harald Haerter's CatScan feat. Nils Petter Molvær, Lyambiko, Simphiwe Dana, Tony Bulluck, Hands On Strings, The Colors – Scieranski/ Wertico Band, Brian Auger's Oblivion Express, Jamaram, The Wild Bunch, Adjiri Odametey Duo, Triband, Pit Müller's Hot Stuff, Birdland Jazz Band, Late Night Musicians – Charly Böck, Roland Guerin, Quamon Fowler, Lawrence Sieberth, Diethard Stein, Torsten de Winkel
21.10.2007–11.11.2007	Nigel Kennedy Quintet, Roger Cicero & Big Band, The Golden Gospel Singers, Victor Wooten Band, Simon Seidl (Jazzförderpreis – Piano), Avishai Cohen Trio, Chris Karrer & John Weinzierl, Ras Dashan Swept Away, Rad Gumbo feat. Dackel Hirmer, Ben’s Belinga, Dotschy Reinhardt Quintet, Milla Kay, Late Night Band: Lawrence Sieberth, Bill Solley, Roland Guerin, Kim Prevost, Quamon Fowler, John Jones, Curtis Stigers, Fredrika Stahl, Susan Weinert Duo, Maceo Parker, Ola Onabule, Cæcilie Norby Quartet, Kristin Asbjørnsen, Nils Landgren Funk Unit, Incognito, Bill Evans Group, Harald Rüschenbaum, Marcus Kesselbauer, C'est si bon, Young Jazz Players, Blindflug feat. Simon Seidl, Charly Böck Latin Project, Birdland Jazz Band
14.10.2008–09.11.2008	Thilo Wolf feat. Joan Faulkner, Kolsimcha feat. Georgisches Kammerorchester Ingolstadt, Chick Corea & John McLaughlin Five Peace Band with Christian McBride, Kenny Garrett & Vinnie Colaiuta, Herbie Hancock Quintet, The Brand New Heavies, Jazzkantine, Malene Mortensen Group, Lars Danielsson Trio, Wolfgang Haffner Band, David Sanborn, Iiro Rantala New Trio, James Carter, Jamie Wong-Li, Christina Jung (Jazzförderpreis – Vocals), Rita Chiarelli Trio, Caecilie Norby Quartet, Pit Müller's Hot Stuff, Tok Tok Tok, Dana Fuchs & Jon Diamond, Hands on Strings, Wally Warning, Ramesh Shotham, Miles Griffith, C'est si bon, Young Jazz Players, Die Klangpatrouille, Jazz Award Project, Jazzgottesdienst Diewock/Schmidt/Schwarz, Birdland Jazz Band
18.10.2009–08.11.2009	Bernhard Hollinger (Jazzförderpreis – Bass), C'est si bon, Peter Schindler: „Hoppel Hoppel Rhythm Club“, Workshop mit Janice Harrington & Steve Hooks, Christian Wallumrød Ensemble, Young Jazz Players, 4 of a Kind, Jungblut feat. Christina Jung, The Bahama Soul Club, Terrence Ngassa & Dominic Quaye, Steve Gibbons Band, M. Kälberer & M. Tubine – „Tukamama“, Les Babacools, Kim Chong Ensemble, Karolina Glazer, Mari Boine, Late Night Musicians, Power of Chick Corea, Stanley Clarke & Lenny White, PSP Simon Phillips, Philippe Saisse, Pino Palladino, Nils Petter Molvær Group, Tower of Power, The Larry Carlton Trio, The Hang All Stars, Curtis Stigers, Jazz X Change, Birdland Jazz Band, Zap Mama
