= Torsten de Winkel =

German musician and composer (born 1965)

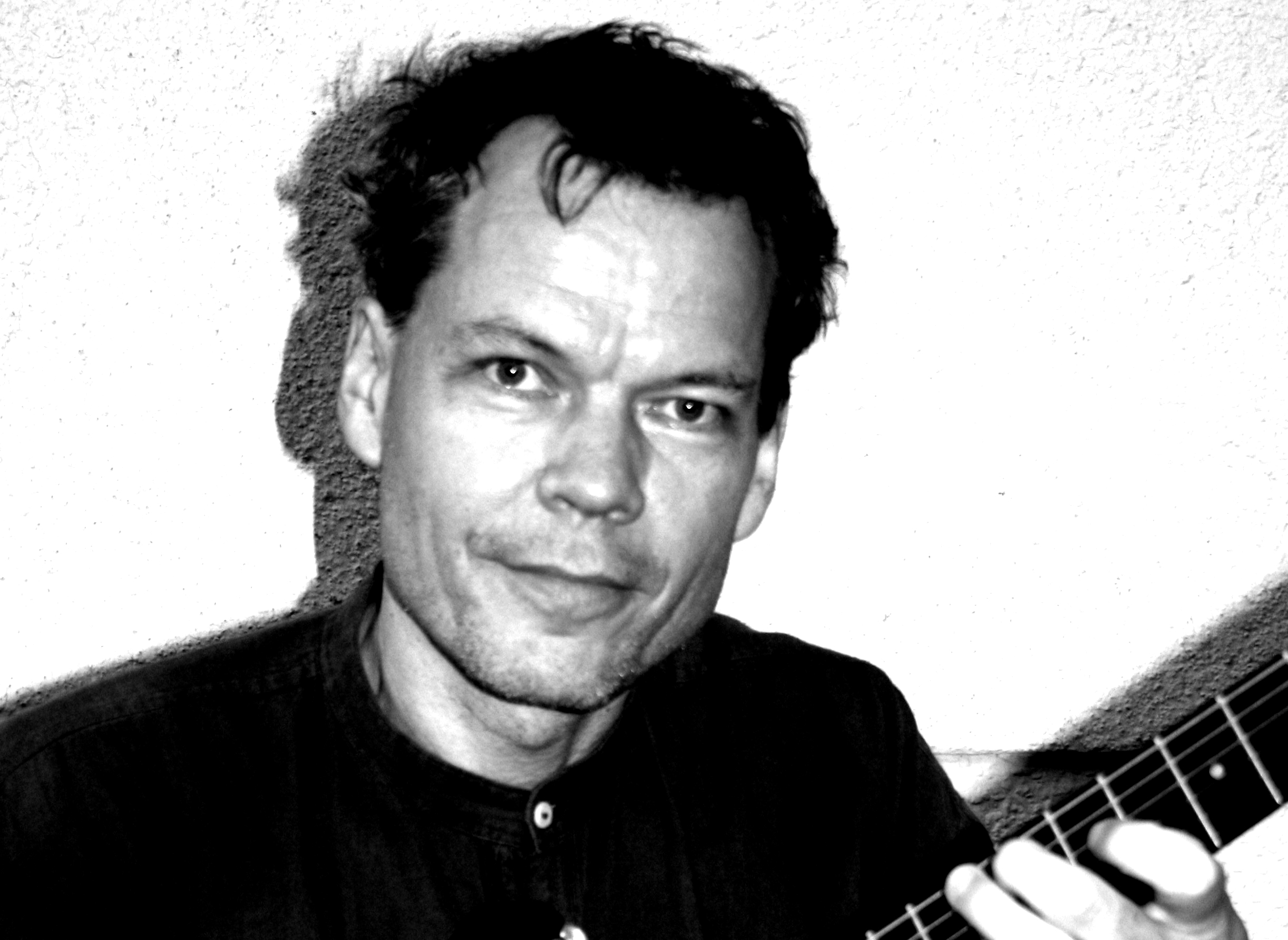

Background information
- Born: 6 January 1965 (age 61); Frankfurt am Main, West Germany
- Genres: Jazz, world music, contemporary fusion
- Occupation: Musician
- Instruments: Guitar, keyboards
- Years active: 1980–present
- Website: torstendewinkel.com

Torsten de Winkel (born 6 January 1965) is a German musician, composer, and philosopher primarily active in the jazz, world music, fusion and electronic music genres. He is known as an electric and acoustic guitarist but also records and performs on electric sitar, keyboards, and percussion. Since the 1990s, he has initiated and participated in several platforms aimed at combining the arts and sustainability.

== Biography ==
At the age of 10, de Winkel picked up the Charango in La Paz, Bolivia where his father worked for the UN. He taught himself guitar and jazz improvisation and attended the Hoch Conservatory in Frankfurt, Germany for a brief period.

For the release of Mastertouch, he collaborated with Michael Brecker, Billy Cobham, Kai Eckhardt, Ernie Watts, Alphonse Mouzon, Hellmut Hattler, Joachim Kühn and various other instrumentalists.

Upon an invitation by Steve Smith and Tom Coster, members of Santana and Journey, de Winkel become successor to Mike Stern and Frank Gambale in their co-led jazz-fusion group Vital Information and toured internationally with this group. He graduated from the Berklee College of Music in Boston. He can also be heard on all ten CDs of the German vanguard electronica-jazz fusion duo Tab Two and continues to tour and record with Hattler, the group of former Kraan head Hellmut Hattler. This group won the Echo Award, the German equivalent of the Grammy Award, for best jazz album in 2001.

== Books ==
- Martin Kunzler: Jazz Lexikon. Rowohlt, Reinbek bei Hamburg 2002.

== Discography ==
=== As leader ===
- Mastertouch (EMI, 1985) – with Michael Brecker, Kai Eckhardt, Joachim Kühn, Ernie Watts and others
- Humanimal Talk (veraBra, 1988) – with Hellmut Hattler, Nana Vasconcelos, Joo Kraus and others
- Torsten de Winkel Acoustic Quartet (Hot Wire, 1991) – with Larry Grenadier, Bob Moses and others
- Tribute: Talking to the Spirits (Hot Wire, 1993) – with Larry Grenadier, Bob Moses and others
- Long Time Coming (nyjg, 1996) – with Buster Williams, Al Foster, Ravi Coltrane and others
- New York Jazz Guerrilla – Method to the Madness *part 1 (nyjg, 1998) – with Jacques Schwarz-Bart, Matthew Garrison, Kurt Rosenwinkel and others
- Bimbache Jazz y Raíces: La Condición Humana (nyjg, 2008) – with Gregoire Maret, Gwilym Simcock, María Mérida and others

=== As sideman ===
With Hellmut Hattler

- Heartware (Vielklang, 1986)
- Mind Movie (Intercord, 1991)
- No Eats Yes (Polydor / Universal, 2000)
- Remixed Vocal Cuts (Bassball, 2002)
- Mallberry Moon (Bassball, 2003)
- Bass Cuts (Bassball, 2004)
- Surround Cuts (Bassball/36music 2004)
- The Big Flow (Bassball/36music 2006)
- Live Cuts (Bassball/36music, 2007)
- Gotham City Beach Club Suite (Bassball/36music, 2010)
- Live in Glems (Bassball/36music, 2013)
- The Kite (Bassball/36music, 2013)
- Live Cuts II (Bassball/36music, 2014)
- Warhol Holidays (36music/Bassball, 2016)
- Bassball II (Bassball/36music, 2017)
- Velocity (Bassball/36music, 2018)

With Tab Two

- Space Case (Intercord, 1992)
- Hip Jazz (Intercord, 1994)
- Flagman Ahead (Virgin, 1995)
- Sonic Tools (Virgin, 1997)
- Between Us (Polydor, 1999)
- Live at the Roxy (36music, 2012)

With others

- Pat Metheny, Secret Story Live (DVD, LD & VHS)
- D.Kay, Individual Soul (Brigand Music, 2007)
- Alphonse Mouzon, The Sky Is the Limit (Pausa, 1985)
- Steve Smith, Fiafiaga (Celebration) (Columbia, 1988)
- Russ Spiegel, Twilight (Double Moon, 2002)
- Aziza Mustafa Zadeh, Inspiration (Columbia, 2000)
- XXL feat. Grandmaster Flash, El Jazz Latino / The Funky Stuff (Sony)
- Deep Dive Corp., Beware Of Fake Gurus
- Timo Maas, Lifer (Rockets & Ponies, 2013)
- Kike Perdomo, A World Of Music (with Chano Domínguez, Eric Marienthal and others) / AC&Funk
- Carola Grey, Drum Attack!
- Various Artists, Basstorius (with Matt Garrison)
- Various Artists,Mysterious Voyages – A Tribute to Weather Report (with Scott Kinsey)
