= Wiederhören =

Studio album by Kraan
- Released: 1977
- Recorded: November–December 1976
- Studio: RÜSSL Studios (Hamburg); Conny's Studio (Neunkirchen)
- Genre: Krautrock
- Length: 41:14 (original); 60:42 (CD Release)
- Label: EMI
- Producer: Kraan

Kraan chronology
Let It Out (1975)	Wiederhören (1977)	Flyday (1978)

Professional ratings
Review scores
Source	Rating
Allmusic	2/5 stars

Wiederhören is the sixth album by the German Krautrock band Kraan. It is the first album after the departure of Johannes Pappert from the band.

== Track listing ==
All songs composed by Kraan.

=== Side one ===
1. "Just One Way" – 4:00
2. "Vollgas ahoi" – 6:07
3. "Silky Way" – 3:58
4. "Rendezvous in Blue" – 5:56

=== Side two ===
1. "Let's Take a Ride" – 5:19
2. "Rund um die Uhr" – 3:45
3. "Yaqui Yagua" – 5:19
4. "Wiederhören" – 7:13

=== Revisited Records 2005 CD Release Bonus Track ===
1. "Ein Wiederhören mit einem Bass Solo" - 19:28

== Personnel ==
- Peter Wolbrandt – guitar and vocals
- Jan Fride – drums
- Helmut Hattler – bass
- Ingo Bischof – keyboards

=== Guest musician ===
- Tommy Goldschmidt – congas and percussion on "Just One Way", "Rund um die Uhr" and "Let's Take A Ride"
