= Palatia =

Palatia may refer to:

- Palatia or Palatias (died 302), a virgin martyr and Roman Catholic and Eastern Orthodox saint - see Palatias and Laurentia
- Palatia was the late medieval name for Miletus
- Palatia was the former name of the main settlement of Marmara Island
  - Nea Palatia, settlement founded by Greeks from Palatia after the 1923 population exchange
- MS Palatia (1928), a German ocean liner
- 415 Palatia, an asteroid
- Palatia jazz, a jazz festival in Germany
- FC Palatia, a predecessor of 1. FC Kaiserslautern, a German association football club

== See also ==
- Corps Palatia Munich, a fencing fraternity
