= Dancing in the Shade =

Studio album by Kraan
- Released: 1989
- Recorded: at AVC Studios during 1989
- Genre: Krautrock
- Length: 50:52
- Label: Intercord
- Producer: Kraan

Kraan chronology
Kraan Live 88 (1988)	Dancing in the Shade (1989)	Soul of Stone (1991)

Dancing in the Shade is a jazz related rock music studio album of the German Krautrock band Kraan, based in Ulm and formed in 1970. Released in 1989, the album contains German progressive rock spiced up with keyboards, drum machines and some Middle East influences.

== Production ==
Kraan had dissolved in the 80s until about 1988. Then they came back, first with a live album (Kraan Live 88) and then with this studio album mostly composed of instrumentals combining elements of both rock and jazz. New member Joo Kraus completes the core of the band - Hattler, Wohlbrandt and Friede - setting accents with his trumpet work. In the sound Kraan brings in its ongoing interest in Middle Eastern melodies, like the instrumentals "Egyptian Cha Cha" and "Middle East Beat".

All tunes are recorded at AVC Studios, Illertissen, except tracks 8 and 9 recorded at Mad Hattler Studio, Ulm. The cover artwork is by Helmut Hattler.

== Track listing ==
All songs composed by Kraan.

1. "Rockets" – 05:06
2. "Good Enough" – 04:44
3. "Egyptian Cha Cha" – 04:43
4. "Polarity" – 05:10
5. "Dancing in the Shade" – 04:08
6. "Banana Moon" – 05:00
7. "Is This the way" – 03:46
8. "Middle East Beat" – 03:50
9. "One Day" – 03:16
10. "Kraan Mooloo" – 06:20
11. "Soldier Drums" – 04:48

== Personnel ==
- Peter Wolbrandt – guitar, vocals
- Helmut Hattler – bass
- Joo Kraus - trumpet, keyboards
- Jan Fride – drums
