= Max Hattler =

German video artist and experimental filmmaker

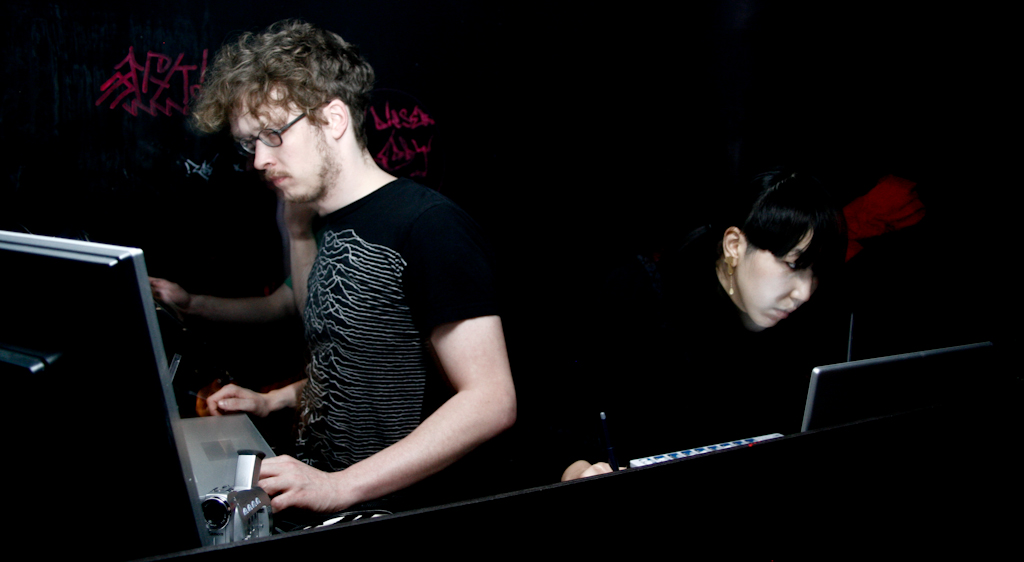
- Max Hattler (left) with Noriko Okaku, 2010
- Born: 2 February 1986 (age 40); Ulm, West Germany
- Education: Goldsmiths (BA), Royal College of Art (MA), University of East London (Professional Doctorate in Fine Art)
- Known for: Video Art, Media Art, Contemporary Art, Abstract animation, Visual music, Animation, Experimental Film, Digital Art, Audiovisual Performance
- Website: www.maxhattler.com

Max Hattler is a German video artist and experimental filmmaker. He created the kaleidoscopic political short films "Collision" (2005) and "Spin" (2010), abstract stop motion works "Shift" (2012) and "AANAATT" (2008), and psychedelic animation loops "Sync", "1923 aka Heaven" and "1925 aka Hell" (2010).

== Biography ==
Max Hattler was born in Ulm, Germany. He is the son of Hellmut Hattler, a German bass player mainly known for his Krautrock band Kraan. Max Hattler holds a BA from Goldsmiths (2001), a Master of Arts in animation from the Royal College of Art (2005) and a doctorate in fine art from the University of East London (2014). He is an associate professor at the School of Creative Media, City University of Hong Kong.

Hattler's work has been described in the following terms: "Max Hattler works on the thin line between abstraction and figuration, being able sometimes to create powerful political statements while eschewing the traditional constraints of narrative, choosing a poetics of implication over the mere construction of a discourse."

Hattler has exhibited internationally at museums and galleries including Erarta, Tate Britain, Pinakothek der Moderne, Tenderpixel (London), Lumen Eclipse (Cambridge, Massachusetts), MoCA Taipei, Exploratorium, Gasworks Gallery, Art Below, Fries Museum, Yota Space and Museumsquartier Vienna.

Hattler also works in the field of audiovisual performance and has performed at Seoul Museum of Art, Punto y Raya Festival and Expo 2015 Milan.

== Awards ==
- First Jury Prize (for "O/S"), Punto y Raya Festival, Lisbon, Portugal, 2023.
- Off-Limits Award (for "Serial Parallels"), Annecy International Animated Film Festival, Annecy, France, 2020.
- Honorary Mention (Computer Animation) (for "Serial Parallels"), Prix Ars Electronica, Linz, Austria, 2020.
- Best Abstract / Non-Narrative Animation (for "Divisional Articulations"), Anifilm, Trebon, Czech Republic, 2018.
- Best Abstract Film for "All Rot" at Third Culture Film Festival, Hong Kong, 2016.
- Best Commissioned Film for "Stop the Show" at Bradford Animation Festival, UK, 2014.
- Visual Music Award (First Prize) for "A Very Large Increase in the Size, Amount, or Importance of Something Over a Very Short Period of Time", Gelnhausen, Germany, 2014.
- Visual Music Award (Special Mention) for "Amnesty International: Stop the Show (a.k.a. WAR)", Gelnhausen, Germany, 2014.
- Bronze Design Lion for "Amnesty International: Stop the Show (a.k.a. WAR)" at Cannes Lions International Festival of Creativity, France, 2013.
- First Prize for "Shift" at Premio Simona Gesmundo, Cetraro, Italy, 2012.
- Award for Best Experimental Film for "Shift" at TOFUZI International Festival of Animated Films in Batumi, Georgia, 2012.
- Visual Music Award (Special Prize) for "Sync", Frankfurt, Germany, 2011.
- Visual Music Award (First Prize) for "AANAATT", Frankfurt, Germany, 2010.
- Prädikat Wertvoll for "Collision" by Filmbewertungsstelle Wiesbaden, Germany, 2008.

== Bibliography ==
- Dan Torre, "Persistent Abstraction: the Animated Works of Max Hattler" In Senses of Cinema, issue 76, 2015
- "Hattlerizer 2.0 – Max Hattler", in: MIMA Artblog, 7 October 2013
- Bruna Volpi: "Max Hattler: Shift", in: Dazed Digital, March 2012 (Interview)
- "Profile: Max Hattler", in: Design Week 26 January 2011
- "Max Hattler", in: Shift Magazine, November 2010 (interview)
- Kate Taylor: "Short Cuts: Max Hattler", in: Electric Sheep Magazine, 1 December 2009
- Andrew Selby: "Experimental Animation in a Post-Critical Age", in: International Journal of the Arts in Society, 3.4, 2008, p. 1-6 (on Max Hattler, Robert Seidel, Semiconductor)
