= Aalener Jazzfest =

Jazz festival in Germany

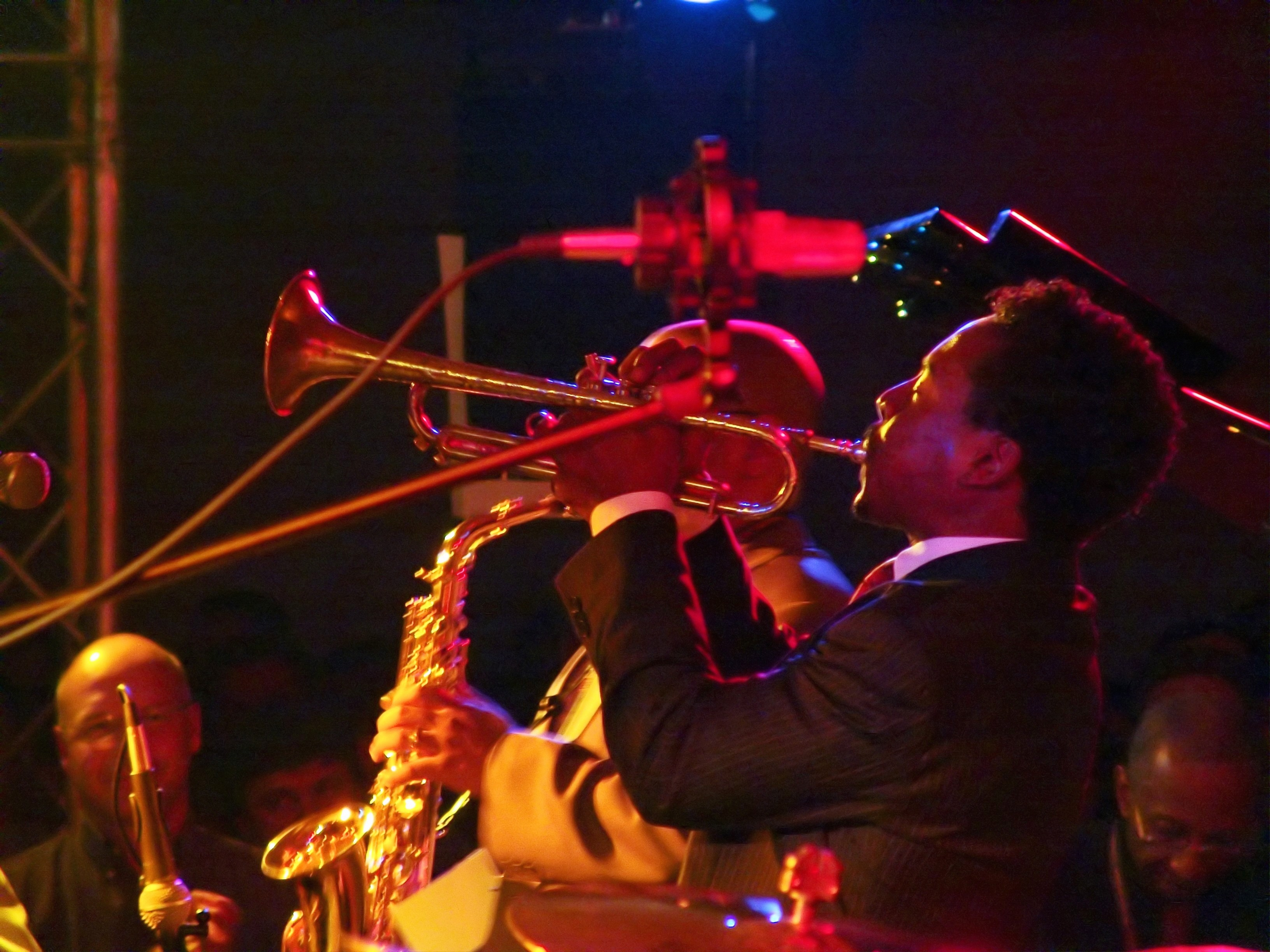
Roy Hargrove at Aalener Jazzfest 2008

Aalener Jazzfest is a jazz festival in Germany. It is held annually on the second weekend in November in Aalen and has about 13,000 visitors annually. Individual concerts in the spring and summer, add to the musical offerings; there are a total of approximately 25 concerts per year. From the beginning, the festival was marked by stylistic openness, accepting jazz fusion, classic hard bop, jazz funk, soul, blues, African music, jazz and world music at the heart of the program. The Aalen Jazz Festival always offers a stage for talent or for musicians who for years have disappeared from the spotlight. Among the sponsors of the Aalen Jazzfest are companies and institutions such as the City of Aalen, various newspapers and utilities.

== History ==
The organization body of the festival, the Aalen Kulturinitiative Association, was established in 1989 and today has about 200 members. Since 2008, the artistic director of the festival has been Ingo Hug. The first Aalen Jazz Festival in 1990 offered an ambitious program with musicians such as Heinz Sauer, Walter "Wolfman" Washington, Jasper van't Hof, Bob Malach and Eddie Harris. A year later, jazz legend Miles Davis played his last European concert on the 2nd Aalen Jazz Festival. Since, Dave Brubeck, Herbie Hancock, Fats Domino, B. B. King, Buddy Guy, Al Jarreau, Van Morrison and Marianne Faithfull appeared at the festival, among others. The main venue is the Aalen City Hall which hosts the big concerts. Smaller venues include the artist's hotel and piano bar. In July 2008, shortly before his death, the late guitarist Hiram Bullock played more than ten times at the festival. He played in spontaneous jam sessions at the piano bar.

== Notable past performers ==
- Dave Brubeck
- Albert Mangelsdorff
- Jim Hall
- David Murray
- McCoy Tyner
- Mike Stern
- Buddy Guy
- Van Morrison
- James Carter
- Miles Davis
- Jan Garbarek
- Mousse T.
- Take 6
- Dianne Reeves
- Archie Shepp
- Dieter Ilg
- The Crusaders
- Maceo Parker
- Joachim Kühn
- Hiram Bullock
- Jimi Tenor
- Esbjörn Svensson Trio
- Joo Kraus
- Kool & the Gang
- Steffen Schorn
- Marianne Faithfull
- Herbie Hancock
- Branford Marsalis
- Gary Moore
- Lizz Wright
- Bireli Lagrene
- Mario Bauza
- Johnny Griffin
- Ron Carter
- Bugge Wesseltoft
- John Scofield
- Charlie Mariano
- Roy Ayers
- Chico Freeman
- Dr. John
- Al Jarreau
- B. B. King
- Ray Charles
- Fats Domino
- Roy Hargrove
- Jan Delay & Disko No. 1
- Tortured Soul
