= Flagman Ahead =

Studio album by Tab Two
- Released: 1995
- Genre: Electronic hip hop
- Length: 55:43
- Label: Virgin

Tab Two chronology
| Robo Talk (1995) | Flagman Ahead (1995) | Belle Affaire (1996) |

Professional ratings
Review scores
| Source | Rating |
|---|---|
| AllMusic | 2.5/5 stars |
| Calgary Herald | B |

Flagman Ahead is the fifth album by the acid jazz band Tab Two. It contains the hit single "No Flagman Ahead".

== Critical reception ==
The Calgary Herald wrote: "Rhythmic enough to get you movin' and yet sweet enough to mellow to, it flows and grows in a space somewhere between 1950s Paris and a London rave."

== Track listing ==
1. MBN Trumpet Intro - 1:06
2. No Flagman Ahead - 5:19
3. Wanna Lay (On Your Side) - 5:24
4. Swingbridge - 4:35
5. (There's) Not A Lot - 5:20
6. Watchagonnado - 4:36
7. Schubertplatz - 5:53
8. Vraiment Paris - 4:49
9. Tab Jam - 4:49
10. Curfew - 5:06
11. Permanent Protection - 5:28
12. No Flagman Ahead (Fog Mix) - 5:18
