= Yota Space =

International digital art festival

Yota Space is a non-profit international digital art festival organized by Yota in St. Petersburg since 2010.

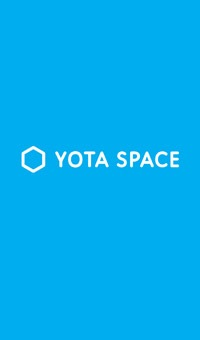
Yota Space Festival Logo

== The Concept ==
Yota Space is an international festival in St. Petersburg, Russia. The festival is dedicated to contemporary digital and interactive art. Yota Space is the space of the future, an exciting creative environment, a platform for sharing experiences and knowledge. The festival is conceived as a space of creative growth and exchange of experience, a major component of the project is an educational program.

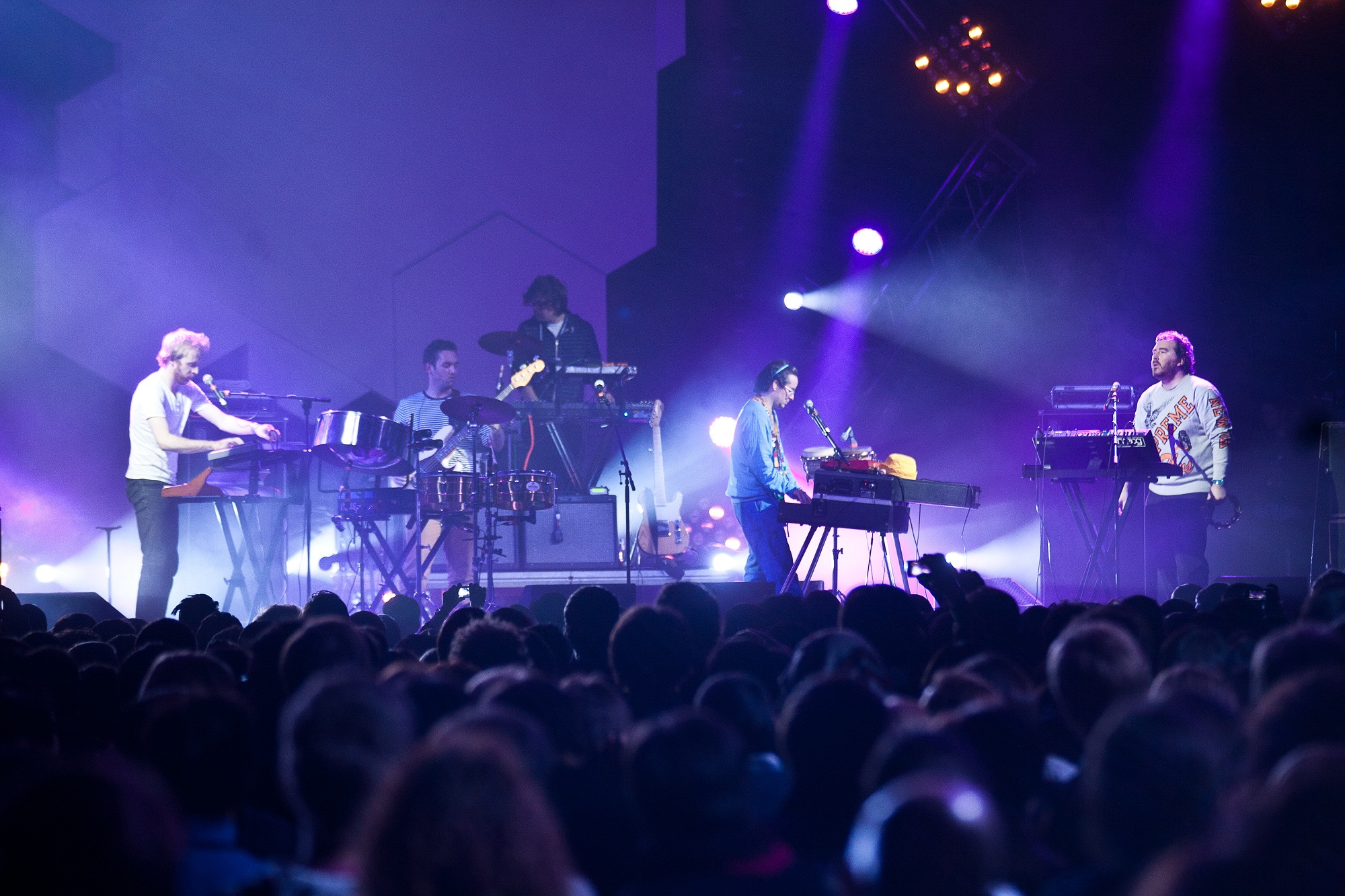
Hot Chip at Yota Space 2010 Grand Opening

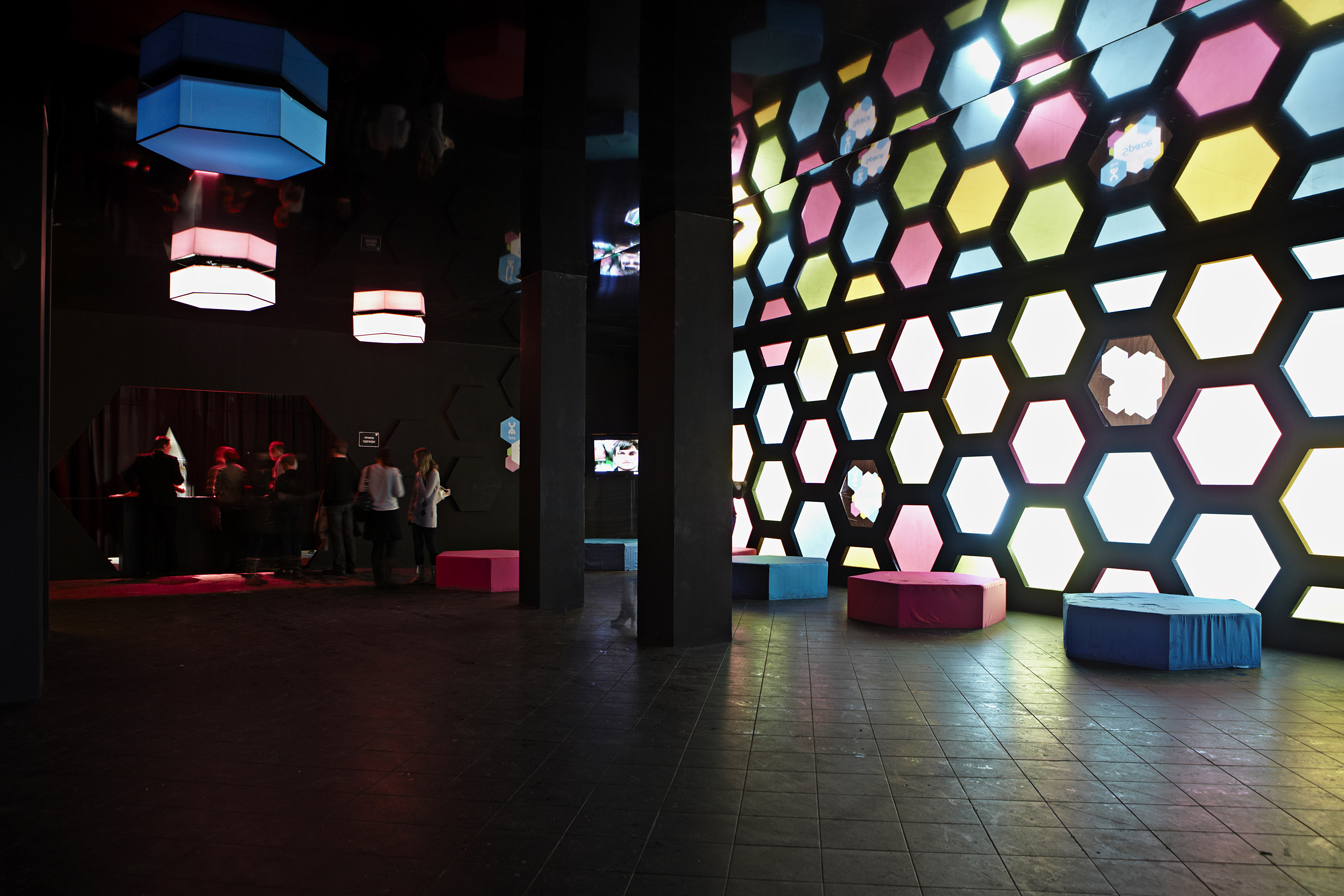
Yota Space 2010. Reception

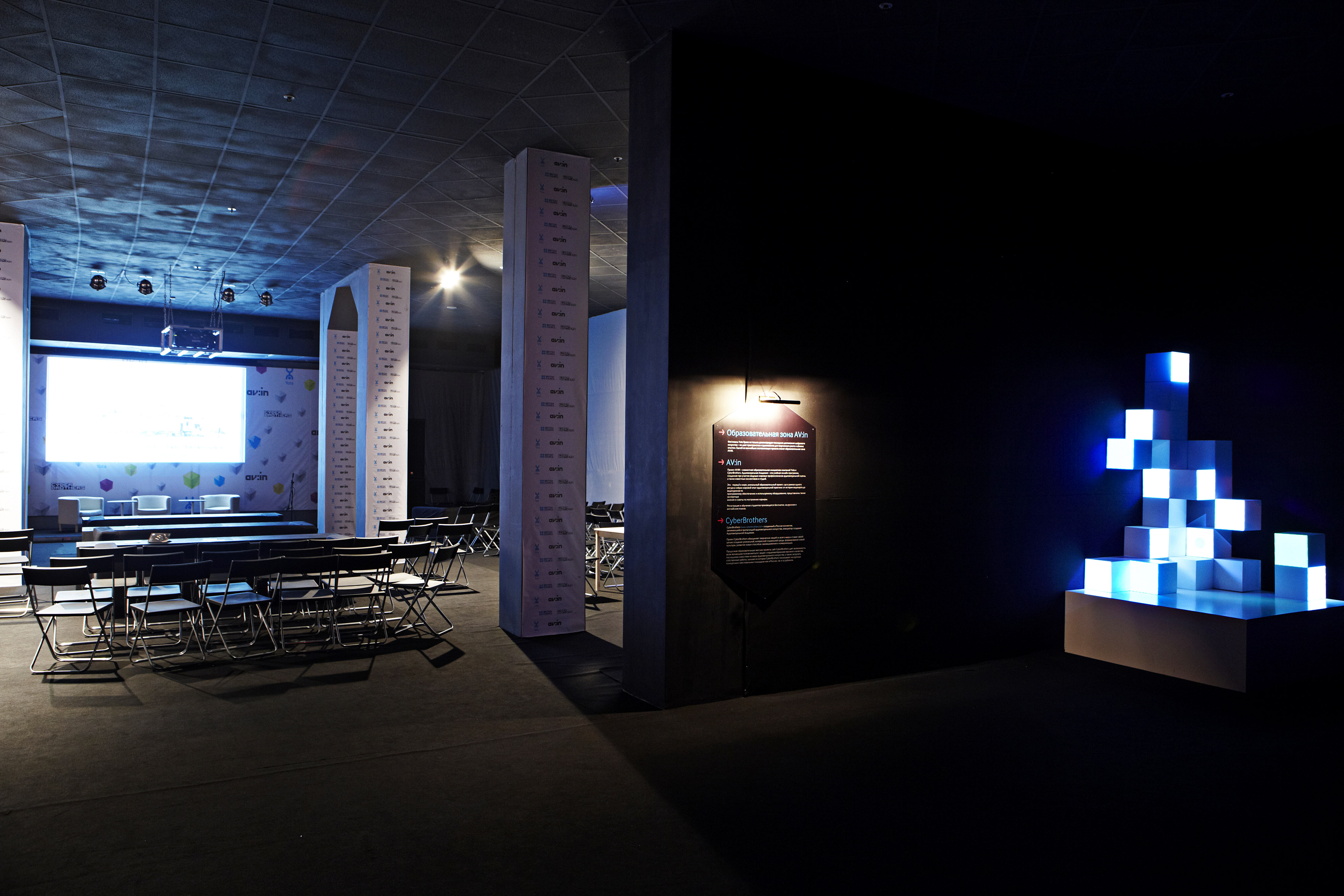
Yota Space 2010. Lecture Hall

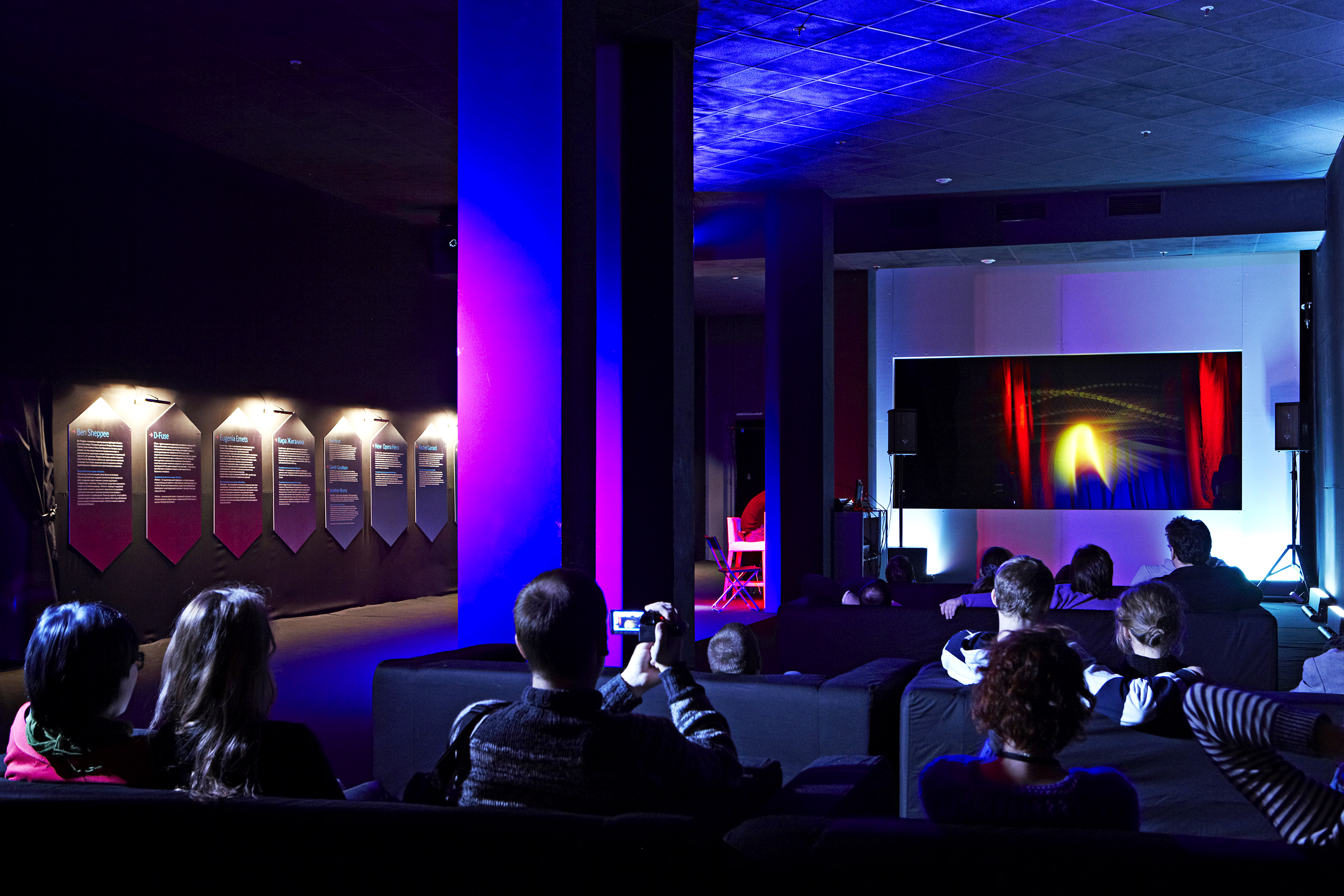
Yota Space 2010. Musion Area

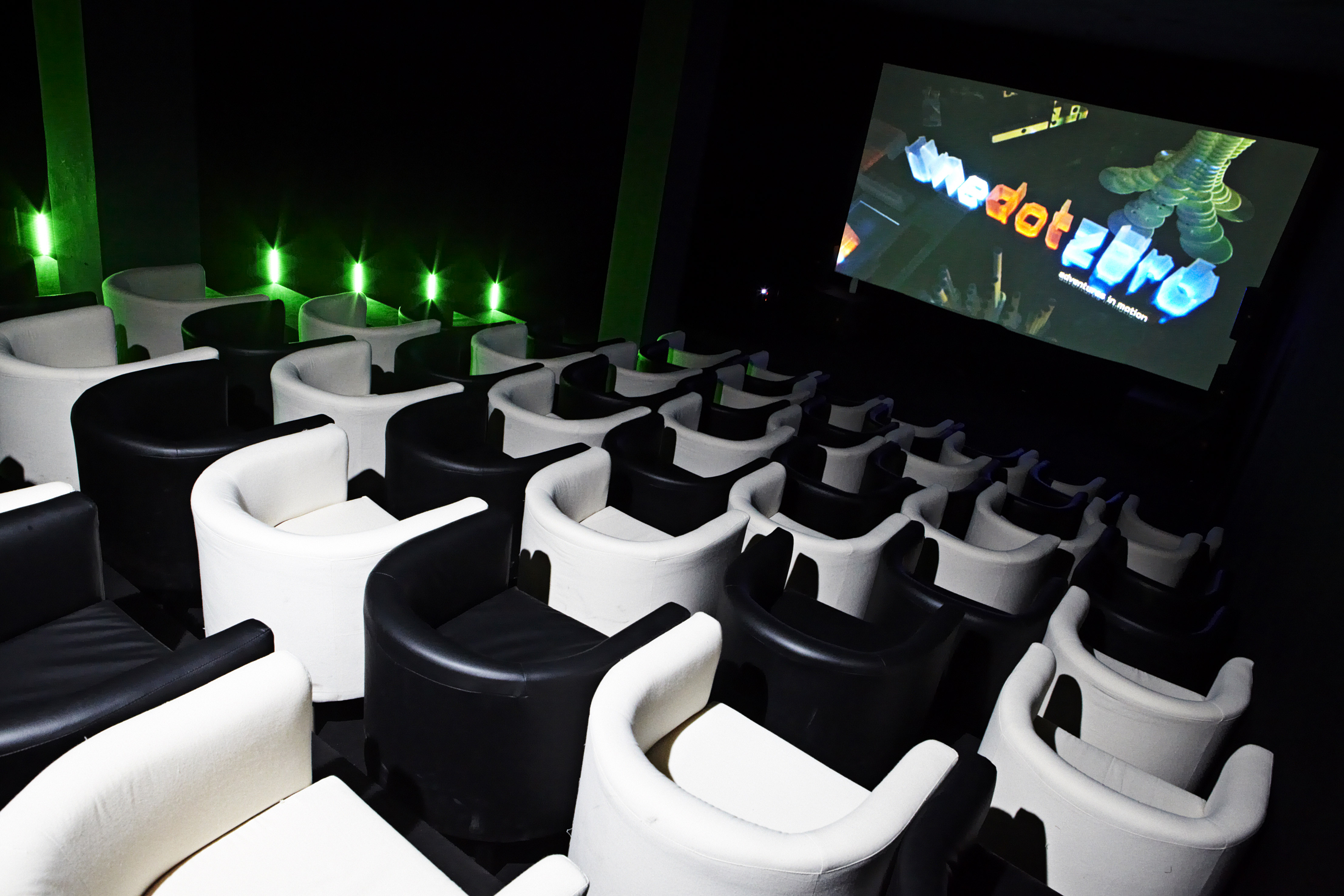
Yota Space 2010. Screening Hall

== Yota Space 2010 ==
The first Yota Space festival was held in St. Petersburg December 5–19, 2010 in a giant former Stalin-era Frunzenskiy department store (Moskovsky Prospect, 60). The festival Grand Opening show was featured with a concert involving Hot Chip, Masters of Skweee, D-Pulse, SCSI-9, etc. The festival received wide coverage in Russian and international press. The Financial Times named Yota Space "The largest digital arts festival in Europe".

=== Artists ===
- onedotzero
- United Visual Artists
- Jason Bruges Studio
- Brian Eno
- MSA Visuals
- Chris Levine
- Hellicar + Lewis
- AntiVJ
- Quayola
- Cassette Playa
- Kin Design
- onedotzero_industries
- Lab212
- Joon Y Moon
- Max Hattler
- Universal Everything
- Musion
- OMG Sounds Productions
- AV:in
- Russian Visual Artists

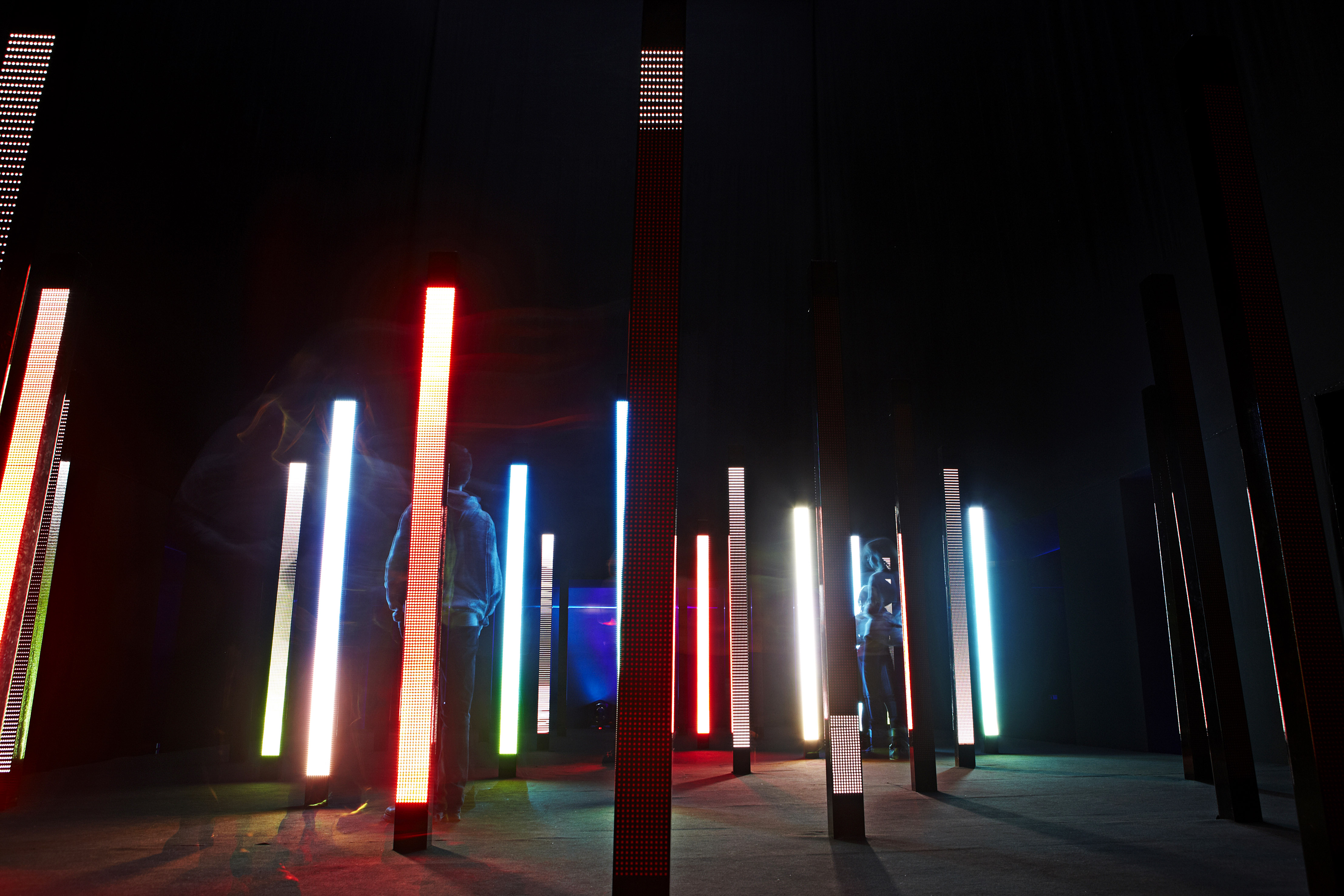
Yota Space 2010. United Visual Artists. Volume installation

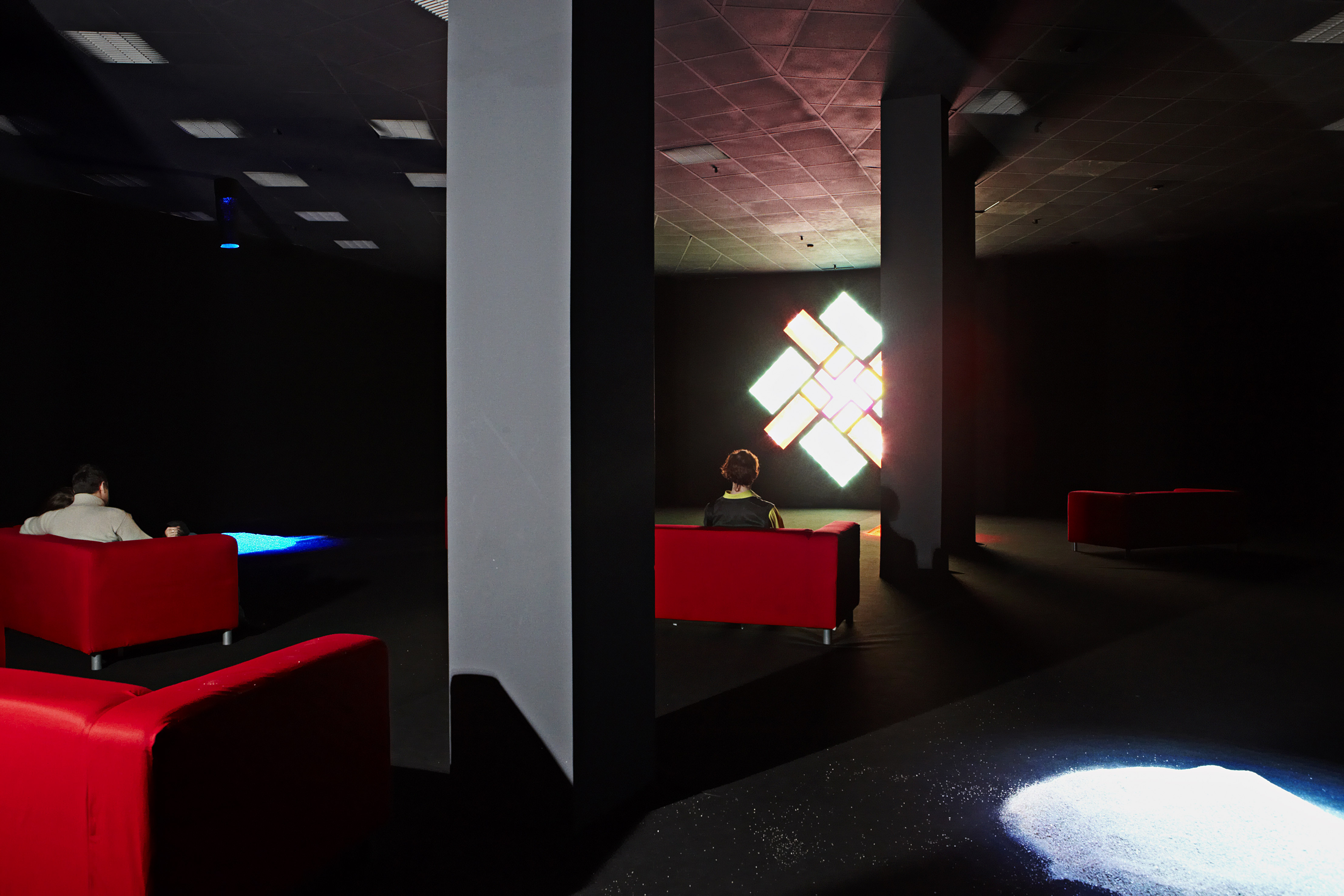
Yota Space 2010. Brian Eno. 77 Million Paintings installation

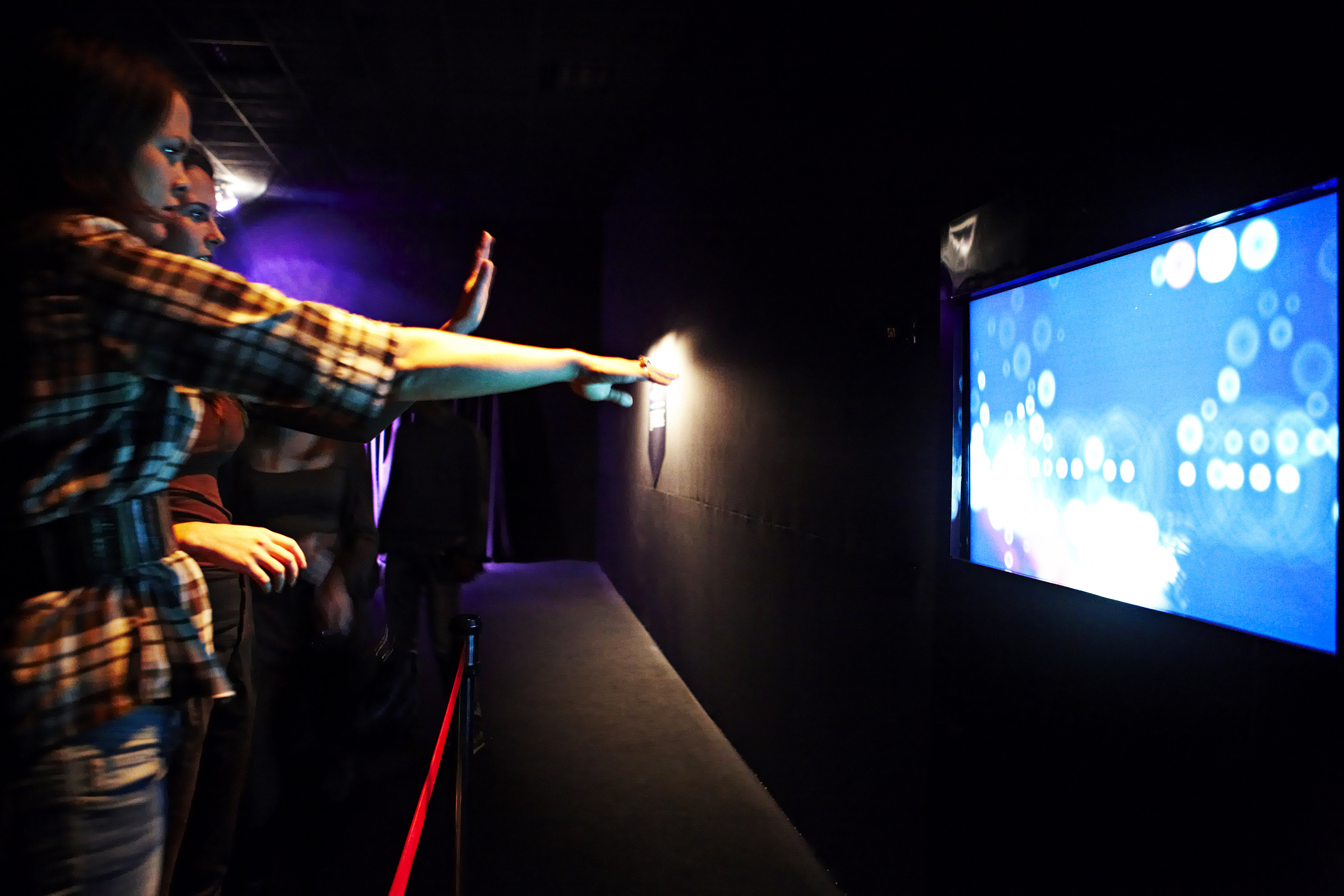
Yota Space 2010. MSA Visuals. Webcam Piano installation

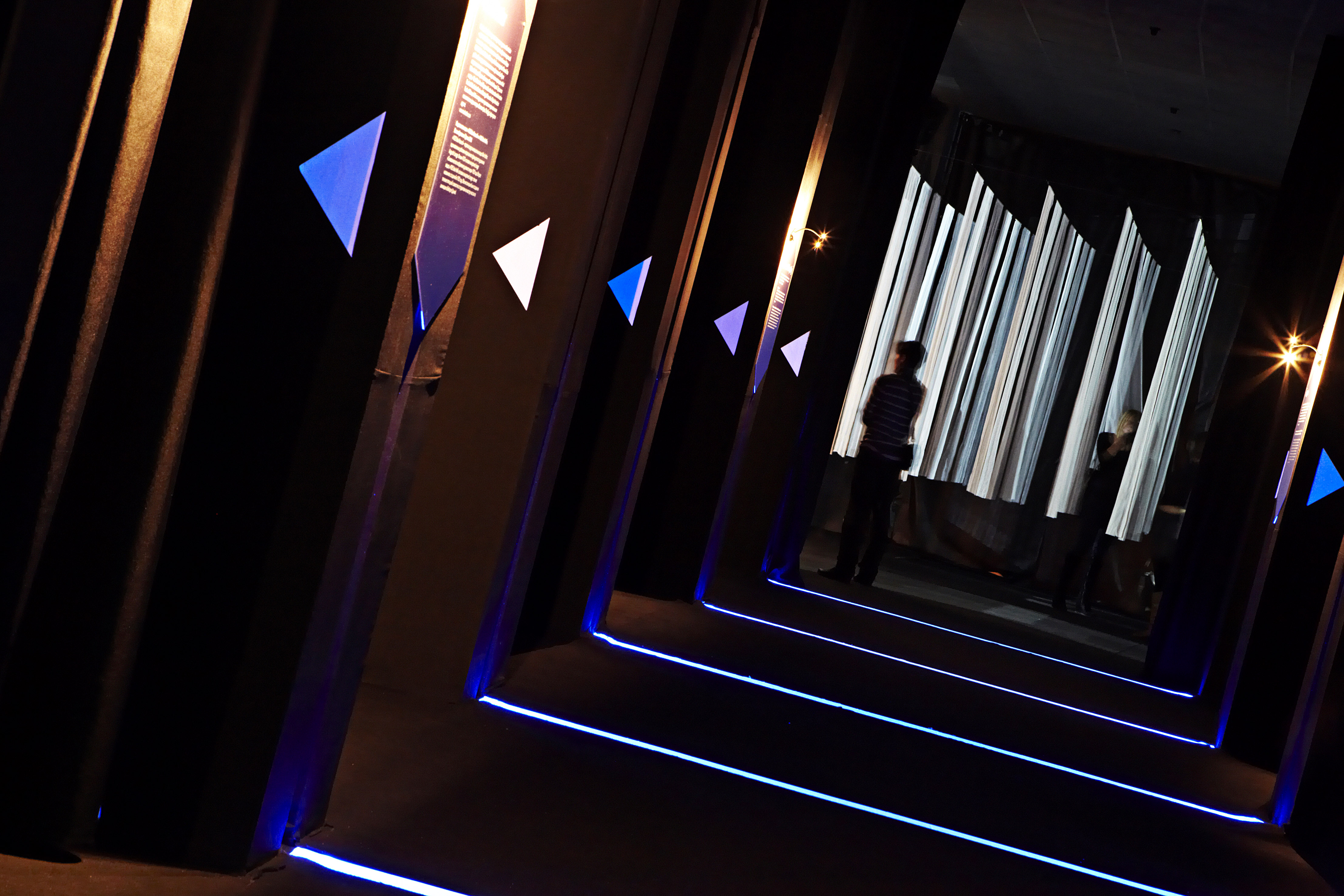
Yota Space 2010. onedotzero area

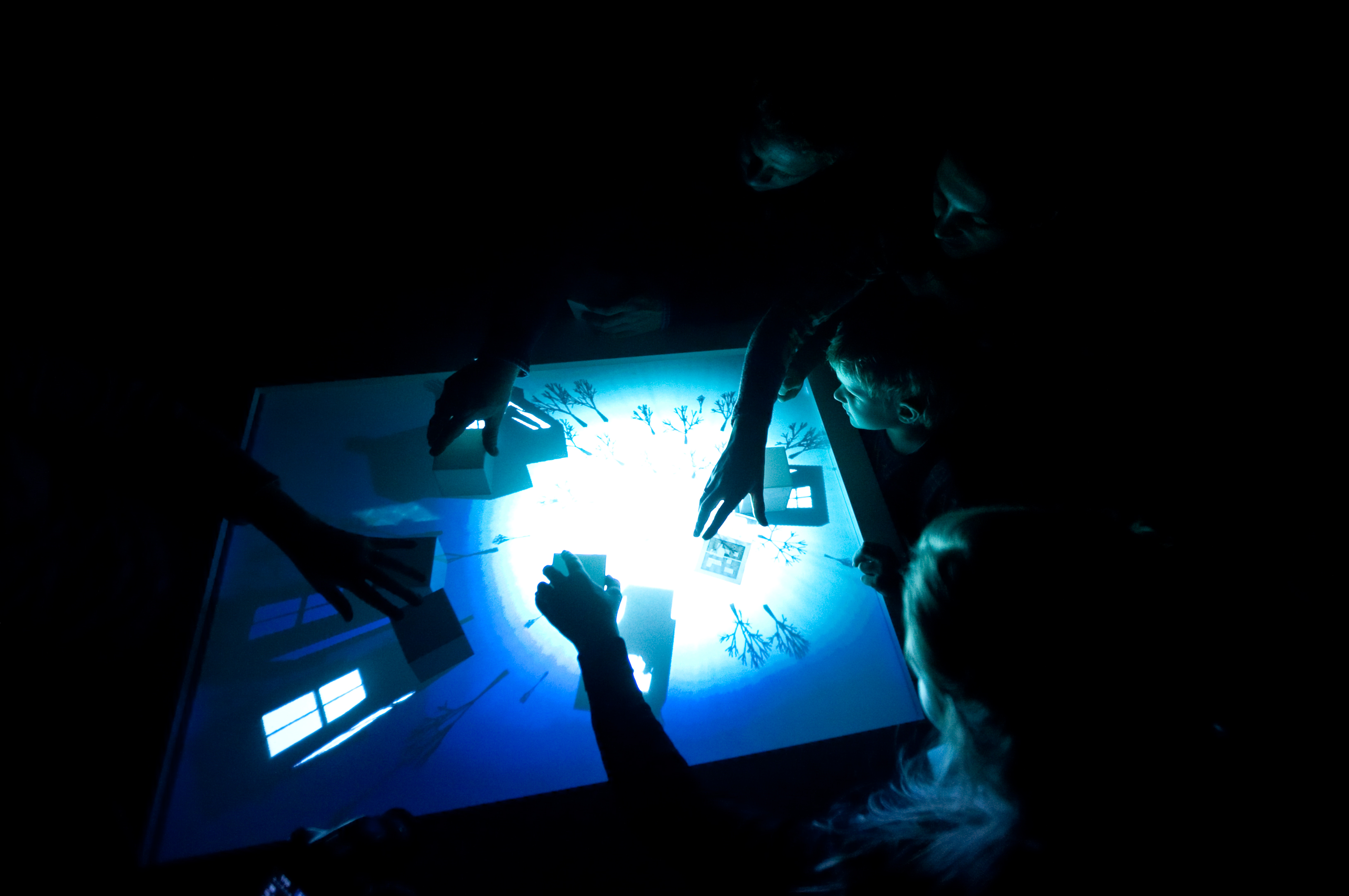
Yota Space 2010. Joon Y Moon. Augumented Shadow installation

== Yota Space 2012 ==
In Spring 2012 St. Petersburg hosted Yota Space International Digital Art again. During six weeks the public was immersed in the interactive space, and transform themselves and their perceptions with new experiences and emotions. As for the first time, the festival was filled with interactive installations, kinetic and media sculptures, 3D-projections, other digital art masterpieces, audio-visual performances, lectures and concerts.

=== Artists ===
Among the participants of Yota Space 2012 are Djeff (France), LAb[au] (Belgium), MSA Visuals (UK), Danniel Hirschman (Germany), Nordic Creative (Norway), Studio Roosergaarde (Netherlands), Zigelbaum + Coelho (USA/Brazil), Jonas Heuer (Germany), Martin Richardson & Chris Levine (UK), Lawrence Malstaf (Belgium), Felix Luque Sanchez (Spain), John Miserendino, Charles Carcopino (Italy), Kurt Hentschläger (Austria / USA), Motoi Ishibashi & Daite Manabe (Japan), Russian Visuals Artists (Russia) and many others.

=== Curatorial Board ===
Yota Space Festival Curatorial Board:

- Alexandra Sanchez-Perez (Yota).
- Shane RJ Walter (onedotzero, Creative Director)
- Ilya Oskolkov-Tsenzieper (Strelka Institute, Russia, Director)
- Olga Sviblova (Moscow Multimedia Art Museum, Director)
