= Tournee =

Live album by Kraan
- Released: 1980
- Recorded: March–November 1979
- Venue: Stadthalle (Neuss); Audimax (Aachen); Finkenbach Festival (Finkenbach); Zitadelle (Jülich)
- Genre: Krautrock, jazz rock
- Length: 42:38
- Label: Harvest
- Producer: Kraan

Kraan chronology
Flyday (1978)	Tournee (1980)	Nachtfahrt (1982)

Tournee is the second live album by the German jazz rock band Kraan. It was recorded in four venues between March and November 1979.

AllMusic described the album as "a competent but unexceptional affair that couldn't help but provoke comparisons to their previous, more exciting live work."

== Track listing ==
1. "Borgward" – 8:24 (recorded at Finkenbach Festival)
2. "Almrausch" – 6:09 (recorded at Zitadelle Jülich)
3. "Peterchens Reise" – 7:01 (recorded at Audimax Aachen)
4. "Vollgas ahoi" – 8:07 (recorded at Stadthalle Neuss)
5. "Yaqui Yagua" – 8:07 (recorded at Audimax Aachen)
6. "Silky way" – 4:46 (recorded at Audimax Aachen)

== Personnel ==
- Udo Dahmen - drums
- Hellmut Hattler - bass
- Peter Wolbrandt - guitar, vocals
- Ingo Bischof - keyboards
