= Thumbs Up (disambiguation) =

Thumbs Up is a hand gesture.

Thumbs Up may also refer to:

- Thumbs Up (film), a 1943 American musical drama
- Thumbs Up! (musical), a 1934 musical revue
- Thumbs Up (newspaper), a Chinese newspaper published in Singapore for school children
- "Thumbs Up", an episode of Rugrats
- "Thumbs Up" (song), by Momoland
- Thumbs Up! (EP), by Pentagon
- 👍, U+1F44D from the Miscellaneous Symbols and Pictographs Unicode block

== See also ==
- Thums Up, an Indian carbonated drink
- Two thumbs up, a trademark held by the Siskel and Ebert families from their film review television shows
- Two Thumbs Up, an album by Tab Two
- Thumbs Down (film), a 1927 silent film directed by Phil Rosen
