= Two Thumbs Down =

Two thumbs down is a catch phrase from Siskel and Ebert's At the Movies (1986 TV program).

It may also refer to:

- "Two Thumbs Down", a 2001 demo from Itchy
- "Two Thumbs Down", an episode from SpongeBob SquarePants.
- "Kitty Flanagan's Two Thumbs Down", a 2012 tour from Kitty Flanagan
- "Statler and Waldorf: Two Thumbs Down", a mini-game from Muppets Inside

== See also ==
- Two Thumbs Up (disambiguation)
- Thumbs Down
