= María Mérida =

Spanish singer (1925–2022)

- Born: 5 June 1925; Valverde, El Hierro, Spain
- Died: 4 January 2022 (aged 96); Candelaria, Tenerife, Spain
- Occupation: Singer

María Mérida (5 June 1925 – 4 January 2022) was a Spanish folk singer.

== Life and career ==
Born in Valverde, Mérida won her first singing contest at 12 years old. She spent her adolescence in Santa Cruz de Tenerife, and later moved to Madrid, where she founded her first ensemble, Hogar Canario, and where she started collaborating with several radio companies including the Radio Nacional de España. Her signature song was "Palmero sube a la palma". The first Canary Islands woman to record an album, she performed on stage with Montserrat Caballé, Plácido Domingo and Alfredo Kraus, among others. Mérida died in Candelaria, Tenerife on 4 January 2022, at the age of 96.
