= Lullatone =

Japanese musical duo

- Origin: Nagoya, Aichi, Japan
- Genres: Electronic, ambient, indie pop
- Years active: 2003–present
- Labels: Audio Dregs, Darla, Childisc
- Members: Shawn James Seymour; Yoshimi Tomida
- Website: www.lullatone.com

Lullatone is a Japanese musical duo based in Nagoya, whose music is characterized by an innocent, childlike quality and spare, lo-fi sounds. Although the group refers to their style of music as "pajama-pop", it is commonly included in such musical subgenres as electronic and indie pop. It is influenced by such diverse sources as bossa nova, French pop music of the 1960s, children's songs and musique concrète.

== History ==
Lullatone's founder was Shawn James Seymour, a native of Louisville, Kentucky. Its other principal member is Japanese native Yoshimi Tomida. Seymour began musical experimentation during his high school years in the late-1990s, using keyboards and cassette tape recorders. He and Tomida met while both were attending Bellarmine University; she as an exchange student from Japan. They soon became romantically involved and when Tomida's visa was due to expire, Seymour decided to return with her to Japan. In the small apartment they shared in Japan, Seymour began composing music late at night while Tomida slept. So as not to disturb her, the songs he created were lullabies. This was the origin of the name "Lullatone", which is also a reference to Raymond Scott's 1964 album Soothing Sounds for Baby. Seymour and Tomida married in 2005.

With Seymour playing a variety of instruments, from the inexpensive Casio SK-1 sampling keyboard to the glockenspiel, melodica, recorders and other compact and simple instruments, and Tomida providing the vocals in both Japanese and English, they recorded their first album in 2003, titled Computer Recital (on the Audio Dregs subsidiary Darla Records). The record was immediately greeted with critical acclaim, garnering considerable attention and reviews from music magazines and independent music blogs such as Pitchfork. Lullatone followed Computer Recital with My Petit Melodies on Japan's Childisc Records, Little Songs about Raindrops in 2005, Plays Pajama Pop Pour Vous in 2006 (both on Audio Dregs), and a self-produced tour EP in 2007 to celebrate their first US tour.

== Members ==
- Shawn James Seymour – vocals, keyboards, percussion, miscellaneous instruments
- Yoshimi Tomida – vocals, percussion, miscellaneous instruments

== Discography ==
=== Studio albums ===
- Computer Recital (2003)
- My Petit Melodies (2003)
- Little Songs About Raindrops (2004)
- Plays Pajama Pop Pour Vous (2006)
- The Bedtime Beat (2008)
- Songs That Spin in Circles (2009)
- Looping Lullabies (2010)
- Elevator Music (2011)
- Soundtracks for Everyday Adventures (2011)
- Alarms & Ringers (2011)
- Thinking About Thursdays (2016)
- Music for Museum Gift Shops (2019)
- Shapes & Time (2022)

=== Compilation albums ===
- We Will Rock You... To Sleep: An Introduction to Lullatone (2009)

=== Extended plays ===
- Music for Apartments (2003)
- Summer Songs (2013)
- Falling for Autumn (2013)
- While Winter Whispers (2014)
- The Sounds of Spring (2015)
- Houseplant Music (2020)
