= Punto y Raya Festival =

Punto y Raya Festival is a festival devoted to abstract film organised by MAD - Moviment d’Alliberament Digital, a non-profit association devoted to cultural engineering through the development of projects involving Art, Science and Technology. The festival aims to explore the "ultimate synthesis of the form·movement duality" in different spheres of human endeavour. Due to the simplicity of its criteria, it uses 'abstraction's prime matter' to reveal the limitations and achievements of our representation systems. Seeking to gain intuition of spacetime in dimensions beyond the perceptible spectrum, the festival offers different editions adding one new dimension to explore at the time.

== Reykjavík Visual Music – Punto y Raya Festival 2014 ==
In 2014, Punto y Raya and Reykjavík Center for Visual Music joined forces to produce "the greatest Abstract Visual Music and Live Cinema event in history" which took place at Harpa and Reykjavik Art Museum in Reykjavík, Iceland. The programme featured live performances by Ryoji Ikeda, Ryoichi Kurokawa, Bret Battey and Hugi Guðmundsson, Max Hattler, D-Fuse, Usaginingen and others; Guest Austrian and Polish Film panoramas, and short film competitions bringing together nearly 500 artists from 46 countries.

== version 0·4 | in space·time ==
This version explores different ways to conceive and represent the fourth dimension.

- In relativistic terms the persistence of an object's movement through Time is a way to represent objects in 4d.
- Films where the "camera" goes right through solid matter to perceive the enclosed interior also represent reality as seen through eyes from the fourth dimension.

== version 0·3 | in space ==
This version explores depth using several projection systems and the notion of perspective in 3d space.

== version 0·2b | with an identity crisis ==
In the second version the festival explored all "dots and lines of a schizoid nature". That is, who suffer from an identity crisis and wish to belong to another dimension. A delightful journey through fractal dimensions inhabited by forms and movements that try to resignify the euclidean categories in a mathematical or poetic way.

== version 0·2 | back to basics! ==
This first "version" of the festival features exclusively dot·lines as ends in themselves. No figuration, no perspective, just dot·lines moving on a plane.
