= Andy Nogger =

Studio album by Kraan
- Released: 1974
- Recorded: at Conny's Studio, July 1974
- Genre: Krautrock
- Length: 38:12
- Label: Spiegelei/Intercord
- Producer: Kraan

Kraan chronology
Wintrup (1973)	Andy Nogger (1974)	Kraan Live (1975)

Professional ratings
Review scores
Source	Rating
Allmusic	4/5 stars

Andy Nogger is the third album by the German Krautrock band Kraan. It is the last studio album from Kraan's original line up.

== Track listing ==
All songs composed by Kraan.

=== Side one ===
1. "Stars" – 5:17
2. "Andy Nogger" – 3:50
3. "Nam Nam" – 5:50
4. "Son of the Sun" – 5:02

=== Side two ===
1. "Holiday am Marterhorn" – 7:40
2. "Home" – 5:40
3. "Yellow Bamboo" – 4:25

== Personnel ==
- Peter Wolbrandt – guitar, vocals
- Jan Fride – drums, percussion
- Helmut Hattler – bass
- Johannes Pappert – alto sax

=== Production ===
- Conny Plank – engineer
- Hans Lampe – assistant
- Walter Holzbauer – supervision
