= Nachtfahrt =

Studio album by Kraan
- Released: 1982
- Recorded: Studio 54 of Berlin; Ege Studio; Conny Plank's Studio
- Genre: Krautrock, jazz rock
- Label: GeeBeeDee
- Producer: Kraan

Kraan chronology
Tournee (1980)	Nachtfahrt (1982)	X (1982)

Professional ratings
Review scores
Source	Rating
Allmusic	2.5/5 stars

Nachtfahrt is the ninth album by the German jazz rock band Kraan.

== Track listing ==
=== Side one ===
1. "Wintruper Echo" (Hattler, Wolbrandt) – 4:30
2. "Faust 1998" (Wolbrandt, Wolbrandt) – 3:56
3. "Elfenbein" (Bischof, Hattler, Wolbrandt) – 5:11
4. "Nachtfahrt" (Bischof, Hattler) – 6:30

=== Side two ===
1. "Playing for You" (Hattler, Wolbrandt) – 3:58
2. "Viel zu heiss" (Wolbrandt, Wolbrandt) – 3:05
3. "Normal" (Hattler, Wolbrandt) – 4:07
4. "Paper Stars" (Hattler, Hattler) – 4:52
5. "Luna Park" (Hattler, Wolbrandt) – 6:02

== Personnel ==
- Peter Wolbrandt – guitars, vocals
- Hellmut Hattler – bass, vocals
- Ingo Bischof – keyboards
- Gerry Brown – drums
- Jan Fride - drums on tracks 1, 5 and 6
