= Let It Out (Kraan album) =

Studio album by Kraan
- Released: 1975
- Recorded: in Wintrup July 1975 and mixed at Conny's studio, Neunkirchen
- Genre: Krautrock
- Length: 38:58
- Label: Spiegelei
- Producer: Kraan

Kraan chronology
Kraan Live (1975)	Let It Out (1975)	Wiederhören (1977)

Professional ratings
Review scores
Source	Rating
Allmusic	2.5/5 stars

Let It Out is the fourth studio album by the German Krautrock band Kraan. It is the first album with Ingo Bischof on keyboards and the last album with saxophonist Johannes Pappert.

== Track listing ==
All songs composed by Kraan.

=== Side one ===
1. "Bandits In The Woods" – 4:19
2. "Luftpost" – 5:18
3. "Degado" – 4:58
4. "Prima Klima" – 4:44

=== Side two ===
1. "Let It Out" – 6:15
2. "Die Maschine" – 4:45
3. "Heimweh Nach Übersee" – 3:12
4. "Picnic International" – 5:22

== Personnel ==
- Peter Wolbrandt – guitar, vocals
- Jan Fride – drums, percussion
- Helmut Hattler – bass
- Johannes Pappert – alto sax
- Ingo Bischof – keyboards

=== Production ===
- Conny Planck – recording and mixing
- Petrus Wippel – assistant
- Walter Holzbaur – supervision
