= Jazzkantine =

German band

- Origin: Braunschweig, Germany
- Genres: Jazz, funk, hip hop
- Years active: 1993–present
- Website: www.jazzkantine.de

Inspired by Guru's Jazzmatazz project, the German formation Jazzkantine was founded in 1993 in Braunschweig. Their first album Jazzkantine won them the "Echo Award" in 1996, the most important German music prize.

The music of Jazzkantine is a cross-over between jazz funk and hip hop music: German rap over music and beats heavily influenced by jazz standards, often interpreted in a very funky way. This genre is also known as jazz rap.

In 1998, they played at the Montreux Jazz Festival.

In 1999, they started a collaboration with the ballet ensemble of Braunschweig, resulting in the successful Tanzzkantine project.

== Discography ==
Year	Title	Chart positions		
Year	Title	Germany	Austria	Switzerland
1994	Jazzkantine	62	-	-
1995	heiß & fettig	38	-	25
1996	Frisch gepresst & Live	90	-	32
1998	Geheimrezept	18	41	19
2000	In Formation	54	-	80
2002	Futter für die Seele	68	-	62
2003	Unbegrenzt haltbar	-	-	-
2004	Best of Jazzkantine	-	-	-
2008	Hell's Kitchen	23	73	-
2009	Unser Eintracht	-	-	-
2012	Jazzkantine spielt Volkslieder	-	-	-
2013	Ultrahocherhitzt	-	-	-
