= Udo Dahmen =

German drummer and author

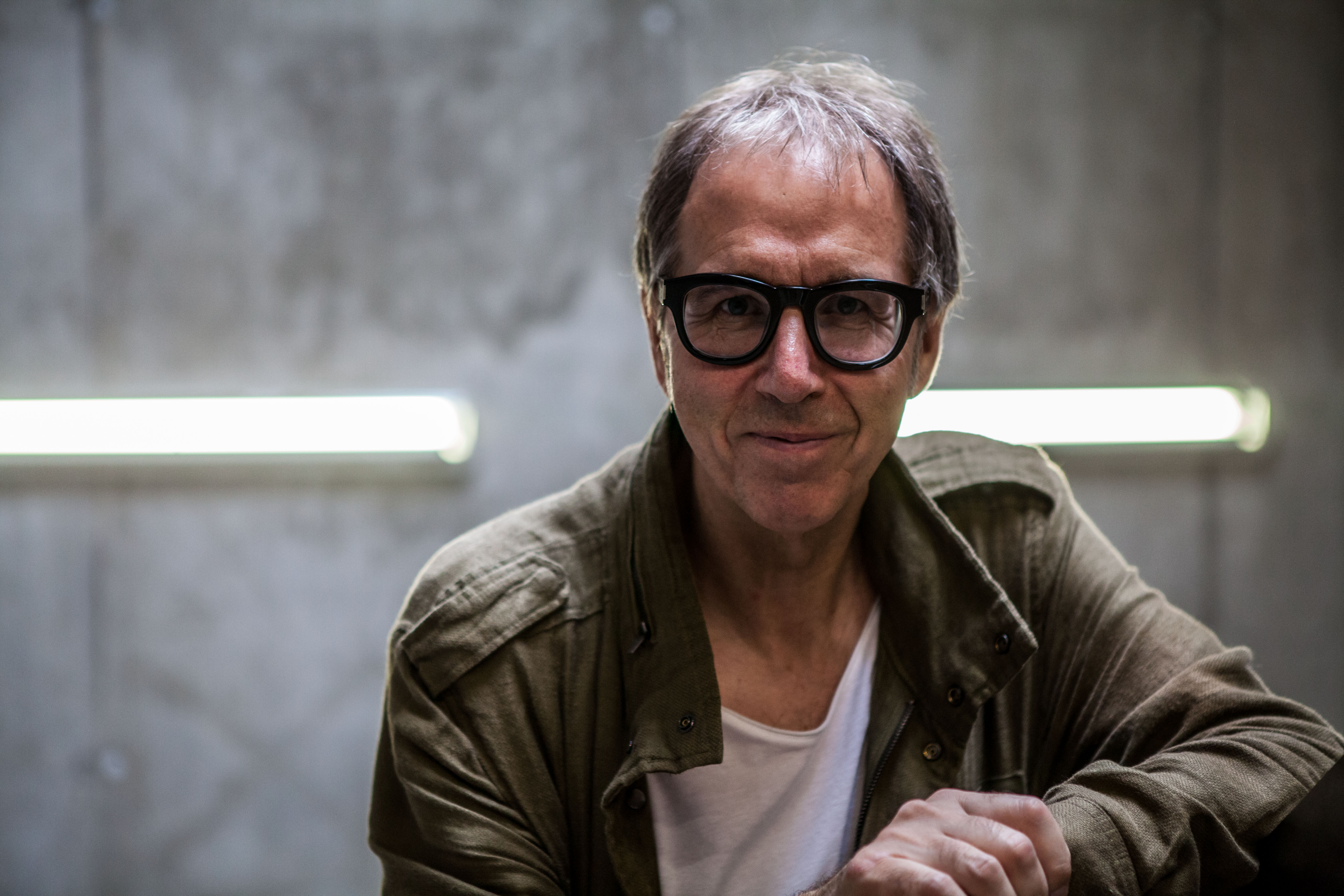
- Dahmen in 2016
- Born: July 12, 1951 (age 74); Aachen, West Germany
- Occupation: Drummer

Udo Dahmen (born 12 July 1951 in Aachen, West Germany) is a drummer, author and CEO of the Popakademie Baden-Württemberg.

== Life ==
Udo Dahmen studied classical percussion in Aachen and Cologne from 1971 to 1976. In Paris he was trained by Dante Agostini. As a session drummer, Dahmen played together with different popular acts such as Kraan, Eberhard Schöner (feat. Sting, Gianna Nannini, Nina Hagen, Jack Bruce, Gary Brooker), Sarah Brightman, Lake, Inga Rumpf, Charly Mariano and many more. Among those, at least ten records made it to the top ten in Germany.

From 1983 to 2003 Udo Dahmen was professor at the Hochschule für Musik und Theater Hamburg. In 1995 he became president of the European drummers' association Percussion Creativ.

Since 2003, Dahmen is vice president of the German Music Council and director of the Popular Music Department at Popakademie Baden-Württemberg in Mannheim.

== Publications ==
- Zwischen Kunst und Pädagogik. Profimusiker unterrichten Jazz und Rock, LAG Musik NRW, Remscheid 1992
- Drumbook, AMA-Verlag, Brühl 1994
- Rhythmisches Training. In: Populäre Musik und Pädagogik, Lüneburg 1994
- Musikalische Reisen für Amateure und Profis. In: Populäre Musik und Pädagogik 2, Lüneburg 1996
- Bodypercussion. In: Musik und Unterricht, Velber 1997
