= Peter Wolbrandt =

German guitarist

Peter Wolbrandt (born 28 October 1949 in Ulm), is a German guitarist most known as a founding member, composer, and player for 40 years in the rock and fusion band Kraan. In the latter part of the 1960s together with his younger brother Jan Fride Wolbrandt and fellow student Hellmut Hattler he played in several formations until they founded Kraan. Wolbrandt is featured in almost all the band's tours and recordings. In 1975 and 1982/83 he played in Mani Neumeiers band Guru Guru. During a two-year pause taken by Kraan in the 1970s, he published a solo album. In 1976 he also recorded the group Highdelberg's eponymous experimental album with Ax Genrich, Hans-Joachim Roedelius, and Hellmut Hattler. In 1980 with Kraan, he composed the film score for the German movie Why the UFOs Steal Our Lettuce. by author and director Hansjürgen Pohland During a longer Kraan break from 1992 to 2000 he worked as a graphic artist and programmer and founded a company with his brother. On the occasion of their 30-year anniversary, Kraan reformed in the spring of 2000 and continues to play with Wolbrandt.

== Discography ==
See Kraan discography

Solo

- So weit (1979)
- Under An1x (1998)
- AND AGAIN (2005)
