= Tab Two =

German acid jazz band

- Origin: Ulm, Germany
- Genres: Acid jazz Hip hop Trip hop Drum and bass
- Years active: 1991–1999, 2012-present
- Labels: 36music, Polydor, Virgin
- Spinoff of: Kraan
- Members: Hellmut Hattler, Joo Kraus
- Past members: Sandie Wollasch
- Website: tabtwo.eu

Tab Two is a German acid jazz band formed in 1991. 'Tab' stands for Trumpet and Bass. The band consists of Hellmut Hattler and Joo Kraus.

== History ==
Bassist Hattler and trumpeter Kraus had played together since 1987, for some of that time as members of Kraan. They began composing together and started Tab Two in 1991. Combining acoustic instruments and electronics, their music was referred to as "hip jazz".

They signed for Virgin Records in Europe, and later Polydor, JVC Victor in Japan, and released eight albums together before splitting up in 1999. Their music was used in commercials for companies such as Mercedes-Benz and Bruno Banani. The duo's 1994 album "Hip Jazz" was named 'CD of the Month' by German magazine Der Wiener.

After interest in reissuing their material, the duo held a press conference in November 2011. The musicians announced a "temporary reunion" with a tour limited to 10 concerts, and the release of the 3CD best-of album Two Thumbs Up in 2012.

In April 2012, at a festival on occasion of Hellmut Hattler's 60th birthday, Tab Two performed for the first time since 1999. The recordings were released as the 6-track album Live at the Roxy, for download only.

In February 2013, Tab Two announced the release of the 3-CD set ...Zzzipp! extended. The album consists of the remastered live recordings from the 2000 album ...Zzzipp! plus an additional track of a rehearsal with the audience, and a bonus CD with seven tracks from the 2012 tour.

In 2013 they played two concerts as Tab Two & Friends, with former guest singer Sandie Wollasch again, and for the first time with a real band, Oli Rubow on drums and Ralf Schmid on keyboards.

== Discography ==
=== Albums ===
- Mind Movie (1991), Intercord Record Service/EMI
- Space Case (1992), Intercord Record Service
- Hip Jazz (1994), Intercord Record Service/Virgin/Victor
- Flagman Ahead (1995), Virgin
- Belle Affaire (1996), Virgin
- Sonic Tools (1997), Virgin
- Between Us (1999), Polydor
- Zzzipp! (2000), Polydor
- Live At The Roxy (2012), 36music (download-only)
- Zzzipp! extended (2013)

=== Compilation albums ===
- Robo Talk (1995), Victor
- Tab Two (1997), Virgin
- Two Thumbs Up (2012), 36music

=== Singles ===
- "My Horn" (1993), Intercord Record Service
- "This Beat Goes Boom" (1993), Intercord Record Service
- "No Flagman Ahead" (1995), Virgin
- "Vraiment Paris" (1995), Virgin - promo only
- "Let It Flow" (1996), Virgin
- "Belle Affaire" (1997), Virgin
- Tab Two (1997) - promo only
- "Get There II" (1998), Polydor
- "No Way No War" (1999), Polydor
