= Kraan =

German jazz rock band

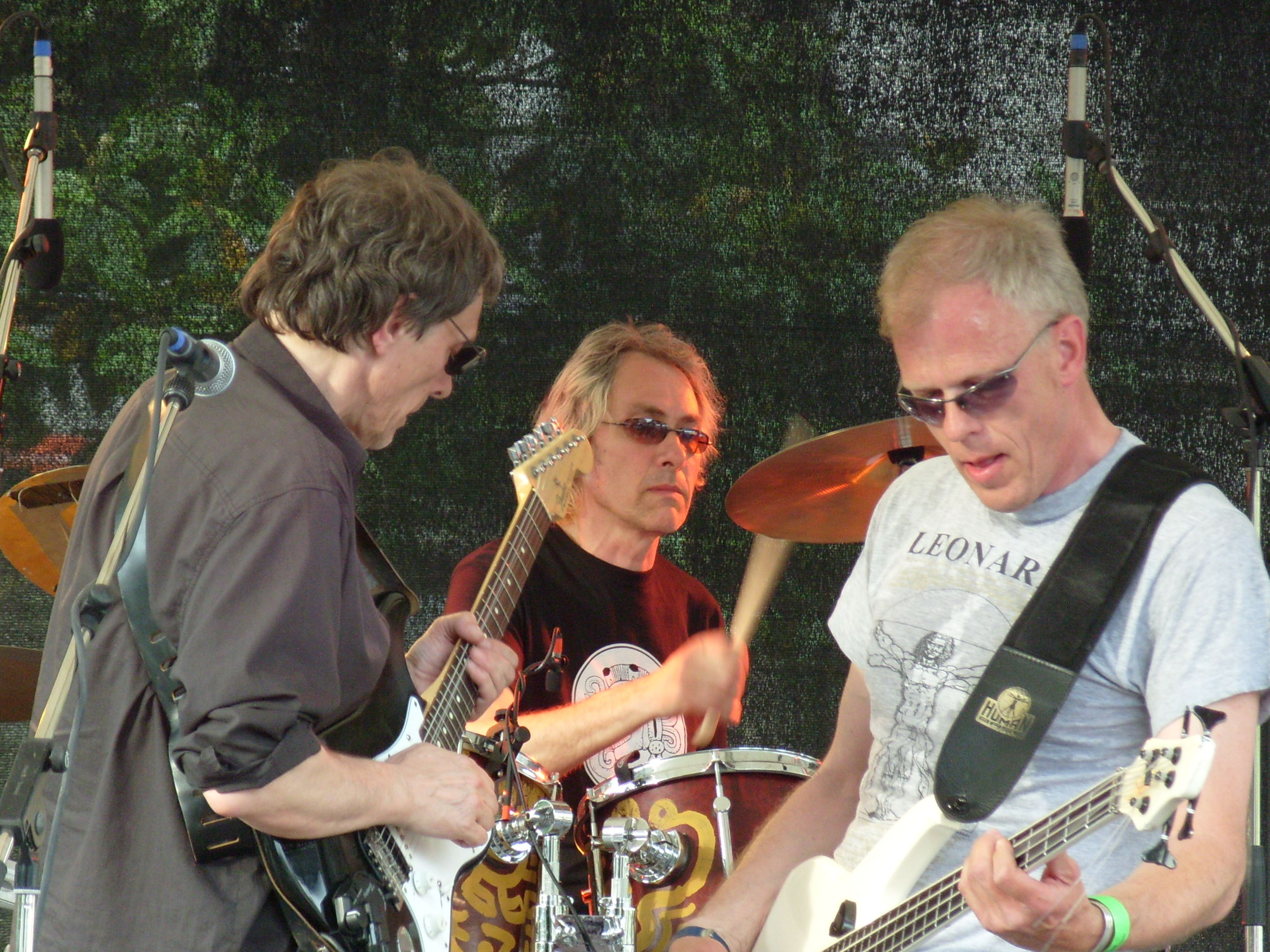
- Kraan in Wiesbaden (25. May 2008)

Background information
- Origin: Ulm, Baden-Württemberg, West Germany
- Genres: Krautrock, progressive rock, jazz fusion
- Years active: 1970–1990; 2000–present
- Labels: Spiegelei/Intercord, EMI, Wintrup Music
- Members: Peter Wolbrandt; Hellmut Hattler; Jan Fride
- Past members: Ingo Bischof; Johannes Pappert; Udo Dahmen; Joo Kraus; Gerry Brown; Eef Albers; Mark McMillen; Tomy Goldschmidt
- Website: www.kraan.de

Kraan is a German band based in Ulm and formed in 1970. It had several minor hits through the 1970s and 1980s. After a break of ten years, the group reunited in 2000. Their early style can be described as Krautrock that turned later to fusion, combining elements of both rock and jazz.

The band was named Kraan, after considering the name Jack Steam. The name means faucet in Dutch, a fact they were apparently unaware of at the time; it has no meaning in German, but they liked it because it was easy to remember.

== Members ==
=== Current line-up ===
- Peter Wolbrandt – guitar, vocals (1970–present)
- Hellmut Hattler – bass guitar, vocals (1970–present)
- Jan Fride – drums (1970–1978, 1984–present)

=== Touring members ===
- Martin Kasper - keyboards (2019-present)

=== Former members ===
- Ingo Bischof (de) – keyboards (1975–2007; died 2019)
- Johannes Pappert – alto saxophone (1970–1976)
- Udo Dahmen – drums (1977–1980)
- Joo Kraus (de) – keyboards, trumpet (1987–1992)
- Gerry Brown – drums, lead vocals (1979–1983)
- Tomy Goldschmidt – drums (1977)
- Eef Albers – guitar (1982–1983)
- Marc McMillen – keyboards, vocals (1982–1983)

== Discography ==
=== Studio albums ===
- 1972 Kraan
- 1973 Wintrup
- 1974 Andy Nogger
- 1975 Let It Out
- 1977 Wiederhören
- 1978 Flyday
- 1982 Nachtfahrt
- 1983 X
- 1989 Dancing In The Shade
- 1991 Soul of Stone
- 2003 Through
- 2007 Psychedelic man
- 2010 Diamonds
- 2020 Sandglass
- 2023 Zoup
- 2026 All In

=== Live albums ===
- 1975 Kraan Live (2lp)
- 1980 Tournee
- 1988 Kraan Live 88
- 2001 Live 2001
- 2018 The Trio Years
- 2019 The Trio Years - Zugabe
- 2020 Finkenbach Festival 2005
- 2025 Aladin Tapes

=== Compilations ===
- 1976 Starportrait (2lp)
- 1983 2 Platten (Best of Kraan) (2lp)
- 1998 The Famous Years Compiled
- 2001 Berliner Ring (Demos and live recordings)
