= Ich Liebe Dich =

Single by La Düsseldorf

from the album Néondian
- B-side: "Kocksnödel"
- Released: February 1983
- Recorded: 1982–3
- Genre: Krautrock, disco, art rock
- Label: Teldec
- Songwriter(s): Klaus Dinger
- Producer(s): Klaus Dinger

Klaus Dinger singles chronology
| "'Dampfriemen'" (1980) | "Ich Liebe Dich" (1983) | "'Mon Amour'" (1985) |

"Ich Liebe Dich" is the fourth and final single released by German band La Düsseldorf. The single was released in advance of a fourth album (to be called "Mon Amour") just before Valentine's Day 1983. Mon Amour was shelved soon after the single's release, although much of its material was worked into Klaus Dinger's debut solo album Neondian, including a remixed version of "Ich Liebe Dich".

== Background & Release ==
Following the failure of La Düsseldorf's third album Individuellos in 1980, tensions between band members became more prevalent. Thomas Dinger recorded a solo album (Für Mich) in 1982, and drummer Hans Lampe threatened to leave the band. Meanwhile, Klaus Dinger used Teldec's sizable advance to build a studio near Kamperland in The Netherlands. In late 1982 Hans Lampe announced he was leaving the band, embarking on legal action to reclaim his share of La Düsseldorf's advance, which Klaus had used to build the studio. Thomas and Klaus worked together for a number of months on the new album, using drum machines more prominently due to their lack of a drummer.

In advance of Valentine's Day 1983 Ich Liebe Dich (German for "I love you") was released by Teldec, backed by a bizarre promotional campaign in which the Dinger brothers filmed themselves spray painting a huge graffiti heart onto the road surface of Königsallee; a Düsseldorf street. The 12" version of the single was released on white vinyl.

Whilst not technically instrumental (the Dinger brothers whisper "Ich Liebe Dich" and "Jag Älskar Dig" over the music) the A-side harks back to 1979's Rheinita in its sound, being primarily synthesizer-driven. The B-side of the 12" single was composed instrumentally by Thomas Dinger, and has many similarities with the music of Thomas' solo album Für Mich.

Shortly after the single's release, Thomas joined Hans in demanding the return of his portion of the band's advance by Klaus, and the band split up. The legal battle over the money and the rights to La Düsseldorf's name and music continued well into the 1990s, Thomas and Klaus finally reaching a settlement in 1997. Hans Lampe refused to back down, and continues to guard the La Düsseldorf name - in 2013 he blocked the release of Klaus' final album - Japandorf - under the La Düsseldorf name.

After the split, Klaus continued to record the album alone, remixing "Ich Liebe Dich" to remove Thomas' contributions and releasing it on his 1985 album Neondian under the name "Jag Älskar Dig". This reflects the song's subject matter - Dinger's failed relationship with his Swedish girlfriend Anita Heedman ("Jag Älskar Dig" is Swedish for "I love you").

== Track listings ==
All tracks composed by Klaus Dinger, except where indicated.

7" vinyl single"

1. "Ich Liebe Dich (Teil 1)" - 5:39
2. "Ich Liebe Dich (Teil 2)" - 2:36

12" white vinyl maxi-single

1. "Ich Liebe Dich" - 6:25
2. "Koksknödel" - 5:32 (Klaus Dinger / Thomas Dinger)

== Personnel ==
- Klaus Dinger - percussion, synthesizer, vocals
- Thomas Dinger - percussion, synthesizer, vocals
