= Mon amour (Klaus Dinger song) =

"Mon Amour"

Single by Klaus Dinger + Rheinita Bella Düsseldorf

from the album Néondian
- B-side: "Pipi AA / America"
- Released: September 1985
- Recorded: 1983–4
- Genre: Krautrock, disco, art rock
- Label: Teldec
- Songwriter: Klaus Dinger
- Producer: Conny Plank

Klaus Dinger singles chronology
"'Ich Liebe Dich'" (1983)	"Mon Amour" (1985)	"'Crazy'" (2010)

Mon Amour is an instrumental tune and single by Klaus Dinger + Rheinita Bella Düsseldorf, released in 1985 to coincide with the album Néondian. In reality, Néondian was a solo album for Klaus Dinger, and Mon Amour in effect his debut (and only) solo single. It was also the first Dinger recording to be released on CD, and the last single Dinger would release in his lifetime.

== Recording & Release ==
After the abandonment of the third La Düsseldorf album "Mon Amour", Dinger worked much of the material into a solo album, released on Teldec under the pseudonym Klaus Dinger + Rheinita Bella Düsseldorf (hinting at La Düsseldorf's most successful single - Rheinita). Dinger recorded the album alone in his Zeeland Studios using synthesizers before asking for the help of Conny Plank, who had produced La Düsseldorf's debut album in 1976. Plank oversaw the overdubbing of Dinger's basic tracks by studio musicians (including members of Belfegore and Jaki Liebezeit). "Mon Amour" was chosen as the lead single and released on CD and vinyl in September 1985. It failed to chart, and in 1986 was deleted from Teldec's catalogue along with Néondian and all La Düsseldorf releases, upon the label's acquirement by WMG.

Confusingly the single was released in three different versions, one of which actually has the song "America" on the A-side and "Mon Amour" on the B-side. Due to the brevity of their production, they are now collector's items. "Mon Amour" is an instrumental, keyboard-based track, whilst "Pipi AA" and "America" are lyrical protest-songs about Ronald Reagan and Neoconservatism.

== Track listings ==
Mon Amour/Pipi AA 7" single

1. "Mon Amour" - 4:40
2. "Pipi AA" - 4:11

America/Mon Amour 7" single

1. "America" - 5:40
2. "Mon Amour" - 4:40

Mon Amour/America 12" single

1. "Mon Amour" - 8:55
2. "America" - 5:40

== Personnel ==
- Klaus Dinger – guitar, percussion, synthesizer, vocals
- Spinello Elze – guitar
- Charly T. Charly [a.k.a. Manfred Therstappen] – drums
- Raoul Walton – bass
