= Isi (song) =

Single by Neu!

from the album Neu! '75
- B-side: "After Eight"
- Released: 20 June 1975
- Recorded: 1974–1975
- Genre: Krautrock, protopunk, art rock
- Length: 3:55 (edit)
- Label: United Artists
- Songwriter(s): Klaus Dinger; Michael Rother
- Producer(s): Conny Plank

Klaus Dinger singles chronology
"Super" (1972)	"Isi" (1975)	"Silver Cloud" (1976)

"Isi" was a 1975 single by the German band Neu!, released in the United Kingdom to promote their album Neu! '75. Like its predecessor "Super", it failed to chart and is now a collector's item due to its rarity. It was sold in an unmarked paper sleeve by United Artists, who marketed Neu! in the UK.

== Background & Recording ==
The recording of Neu! '75, the last of Neu!'s original studio albums, was begun in December 1974 at Conny Plank's studio in Cologne. Like Neu! 2, the album has a definite binary nature, with the first side recorded by the original duo of Dinger and Rother, the second by the expanded four-part Neu!-La Düsseldorf supergroup. "Isi" is taken from the album's A or 'Michael Rother' side, whilst "After Eight" is from the Klaus Dinger-La Düsseldorf dominated side of the album. Dinger recognised this duality, admitting that "me and Michael drift[ed] apart," but Rother maintains that "it was the combination of our two strengths which made the magic." Either way, Dinger's apparent contribution to "Rother's" side of the single is limited to the drums on Isi, whilst Rother's contribution to the "La Düsseldorf" side is the guitar solo, on "After Eight". Neu! '75 was also the first album for which Dinger wrote lyrics, and the subject matter was largely his now ended romance with Anita. The lyrics of "After Eight" feature the repeated refrain, "Help me through the night."

== Track listing ==
All tracks composed by Klaus Dinger and Michael Rother.

1. "Isi" – 3:55
2. "After Eight" – 4:42

== Personnel ==
- Michael Rother – guitar, keyboards, production
- Klaus Dinger – drums
