= Silver Cloud (song) =

Single by La Düsseldorf

from the album La Düsseldorf
- B-side: "La Düsseldorf"
- Released: 1976
- Recorded: 1975
- Genre: Krautrock, Disco, Art Rock
- Label: Teldec, Telefunken, Bureau B
- Songwriter: Klaus Dinger
- Producer: Conny Plank

Klaus Dinger singles chronology
"'Isi'" (1975)	"Silver Cloud" (1976)	"'Rheinita'" (1979)

"Silver Cloud" is the debut single by German band La Düsseldorf, released in advance of their eponymous debut album. The single peaked at number 2 on the German music charts and made La Düsseldorf famous. Unusually for a high-charting single, "Silver Cloud" is entirely instrumental (although the B-side "La Düsseldorf" is not). The single continues to be popular, and was re-released on CD in 2008.

== Background & Success ==
Following the release of Neu! '75 in 1975, Neu! disbanded, and Klaus Dinger began writing music for a La Düsseldorf album. La Düsseldorf had been founded the previous year during Neu!'s 1973-4 hiatus, and both Thomas Dinger and Hans Lampe had featured on Neu! '75 playing drums. Nevertheless, Klaus initially had difficulty composing material for the new album, finally entering Conny Plank's studio in September 1975.

After sessions were completed in December of that year, "Silver Cloud" was selected as the album's lead single. It quickly rose through the charts, making Thomas, Klaus and Hans overnight celebrities, particularly in their home city of Düsseldorf, where the band logo was spray-painted on the streets by fans and Thomas became a fashion icon.

== Releases & track listings ==
In Germany the single was released by Teldec on 7" vinyl. In 2008 Bureau B re-released the single on CD. The track listing on both releases was as follows—

All tracks composed by Klaus Dinger.

1. "Silver Cloud" - 3:38
2. "La Düsseldorf" - 2:34

In Spain, Teldec's parent company Telefunken released a promotional single Düsseldorf, which did not feature "Silver Cloud" but "Düsseldorf", another song from La Düsseldorf's debut album—

All tracks composed by Klaus Dinger.

1. "Düsseldorf Part 1" - 4:00
2. "Düsseldorf Part 2" - 3:27

== Personnel ==
La Düsseldorf

- Klaus Dinger - guitar, keyboards, synthesizer, vocals
- Thomas Dinger - drums, percussion, vocals
- Hans Lampe - electronics, keyboards, percussion, synthesizer

other musicians

- Harald Konietzko - bass
