= Düsseldorf (album) =

Studio album by La! Neu?
- Released: December 1996
- Recorded: 1995–6
- Length: 69:33
- Label: Captain Trip Records
- Producer: Klaus Dinger

Klaus Dinger chronology
Neu! '72 Live in Dusseldorf (1996)	Düsseldorf (1996)	Zeeland (1997)

Düsseldorf is a 1996 album by the German band La! Neu?, recorded in the year following the band's formation in summer 1995. The album features several members of the Düsseldorf band Kreidler, and was recorded primarily in the city after which it is named. It was released during a period of intense musical activity for Klaus Dinger, who had just signed to the Japanese record label Captain Trip Records, which he used to market two previously unreleased Neu! albums. It is La! Neu?'s debut album, although of the musicians featured on it only Dinger and Victoria "Wicki" Wehrmeister would form a consistent part of the future La! Neu?

== Background and recording ==
In late 1994 Dinger was contacted by a group of young Düsseldorf musicians who had recently formed Kreidler and released their debut album "Riva". Dinger jammed with the band twice in his Düsseldorf studios and was pleased with the result (although these sessions were not recorded). In 1995 he travelled to Berlin to sit-in on sessions for Kreidler's second album "Weekend", and quickly identified keyboardist Andreas Reihse as a future collaborator.

On 9 May 1995 (on his mother's 72nd birthday), Dinger recorded the majority of the track "Hero '96" in his home studio, using drum machines and his 16-track tape recorder. He improvised lyrics using a piece of pop art (entitled "New Dead-Line (12345 Mandela)" and reproduced in the CD booklet) which he was working on at the time. The song title and lyrics refer to the Neu! track "Hero" which he had written twenty years earlier. When he played the track to Reihse at their next meeting, Reihse suggested that a backing vocal track be recorded, using his acquaintance Victoria Wehrmeister. Wehrmester was at that time vocalist and saxophonist for "Superbilk", another Düsseldorf band which had released a joint single with Kreidler ("Kookaï / Bildidee" ) earlier that year.

Dinger immediately arranged to meet Wehrmeister at a nearby ice-cream parlour. The pair then rode to Dinger's studio on their bicycles and Wehrmeister recorded improvised backing vocals in her trademark ululating style. A few days later Dinger allowed Reihse to record a final improvised synthesizer track for "Hero '96", before announcing the song complete.

In December 1995 Dinger and Reihse decided to see if it was possible to record a song using all sixteen tracks of Dinger's tape recorder. The pair organised a jamming session on 22 December, inviting Kreidler's drummer Thomas Klein and Die Engel des Herrn's drummer Klaus Immig as well as Dinger's friends Dirk Flader and Konstantin Wienstroer (who had appeared on Die Engel des Herrn's album Live As Hippie-Punks). The six musicians recorded a lengthy track featuring multi-layered synthesizer and guitar tracks, which appears on the album as "D.- 22.12.95". The jam was never intended for release (Dinger says that "it wasn't taken particularly seriously by anybody except that it was fun"), but Dinger discovered the unmixed recording nine months later when preparing the album, and asked Reihse and Flader to mix it.

Some time earlier, Dinger had recorded the entirety of "Mayday '95" in his studio with Andreas, and now recorded an acoustic version with Wehrmeister. The audio tape version was stolen in a burglary in late 1996 before it could be mastered, but an 8" video recording survived, the audio from which was subsequently used for the album under the name "Mayday '96".

== Production and packaging ==
Dinger mastered the album in the autumn of 1996, now envisaging it as the first part of a two album set paying homage to his two homes – Düsseldorf and Zeeland. The recordings feature audio clicks and drop-outs prominently, as well as a difference in volume between tracks. Far from being accidental, Dinger viewed these as being "part of the production game", i.e. part of his low-fi, pop art artistic scheme.

The album was released by Captain Trip Records in December 1996 (just prior to the start of La! Neu?'s Japanese tour). The artwork was created by Dinger and Reihse on the latter's WP8 computer, then photographed by Ken Matsutani (head of CTR) for release. The booklet features photographs from a 1996 exhibition of Dinger's visual art in Auckland, New Zealand, as well as still shots of Neu!. It is accompanied by a press release in Japanese and English written by Satoru Higashiseto of CTR.

== Track listing ==
All tracks composed by Klaus Dinger except where indicated.

1. "Hero '96 (J'Accuse)" – 22:42
2. "Mayday '95" – 4:31
3. "D.- 22.12.95" – 33:44 (Klaus Dinger / Dirk Flader / Klaus Immig / Thomas Klein / Andreas Reihse)
4. "Mayday '96" – 8:36

== Personnel ==
- Klaus Dinger – bass, drums, guitar, vocals
- Dirk Flader – guitar (tr. 3)
- Klaus Immig – drums (tr. 3)
- Thomas Klein – drums (tr. 3)
- Andreas Reihse – piano, synthesizer (tr. 1, 2 & 3)
- Victoria "Wicki" Wehrmeister – vocals (tr. 1 & 4)
- Konstantin Wienstroer – bass (tr. 3)
