= Néondian =

Néondian (Klausi scheißt auf Hollywood)

Studio album by Klaus Dinger + Rheinita Bella Düsseldorf
- Released: 1985
- Recorded: 1983–4
- Label: Teldec
- Producer: Conny Plank

Klaus Dinger chronology
Individuellos (1980)	Néondian (Klausi scheißt auf Hollywood) (1985)	Die Engel des Herrn (1992)

Singles from Néondian
- 1. "Ich Liebe Dich" Released: February 1983; 2. "Mon Amour" Released: September 1985

Néondian is a 1985 album by the German musician Klaus Dinger. Néondian was originally intended to be released as the fourth La Düsseldorf album (and titled Mon Amour), but the departure of Dinger's two bandmates in 1983 and the ensuing legal battle over the band's name forced Teldec to release the album under the obscure moniker "Klaus Dinger + Rheinita Bella Düsseldorf" (referencing La Düsseldorf's best selling single - "Rheinita").

== Recording ==
The basic tracks for the album were recorded in 1983 by Klaus and Thomas Dinger at the newly built Zeeland Studios near the Dutch town of Kamperland. For the first time, Dinger had access to digital synthesizers and other new technology, which he made use of on the record. This later led him to dismiss the album as "mechanical music". In late 1983 the single "Ich Liebe Dich" was released under the La Düsseldorf name, but soon after Thomas Dinger left the sessions (drummer Hans Lampe had left several months previously). Dinger removed his brother's vocal contributions and finalised the tracks alone.

Feeling dissatisfied with the music produced, Dinger travelled to Cologne to enlist the help of Conny Plank, who had produced the first La Düsseldorf album.

"I must say, Conny was very friendly to me after having been very angry with me for leaving him since "Viva". He accepted me from the beginning to help me, and out of this came "Néondian"."

Plank and Dinger finished the album with studio musicians, including Jaki Liebezeit and members of Belfegore. By late 1984 sessions were completed, although their cost had driven Dinger into debt.

== Content ==
The album's subject matter is largely darker than Dinger's previous three albums, mirroring changes in German culture. Like contemporary bands such as D.A.F., Dinger wrote of America's political and cultural hegemony over the western world, often comparing the policies of Ronald Reagan to those of the Nazis ("Heil Ronald!" is a lyric from the song Pipi AA). Dinger also criticises the commercialism and inhumanity of society ("Businessmen verkauft die Welt / Tod und Leben gegen Geld" -- Businessmen sell the earth / Death and life versus money). By far the most famous (and inflammatory) song to come from Néondian is America, an anti-US pop song, which Warner Bros. refused to print the lyrics of in the album's official CD re-release. Perhaps the most striking lyrics are -- "Don't say you fight for freedom / You stole all your land from Indians / In a holocaust / And you still do!" This reflects Dinger's outrage at the Reagan administration's treatment of Native American Indians, an issue which he was passionate about, and for which the album is named (Néon = Neon (urban), -dian = Indian). The album cover art features visual representations of many of these themes, Dinger having a white feather stuck to his head with a sticking plaster, and the lid of a Coca-Cola bottle stuck to the photo.

== Releases ==
Due to his ongoing legal battle with Thomas Dinger and Hans Lampe over the rights to the La Düsseldorf material (which at that time was going well for Klaus), Teldec chose to avoid delaying the album any longer and release it under the project name "Klaus Dinger + Rheinita Bella Düsseldorf". This decision enraged Dinger, who rightly foresaw the album's commercial failure without the use of the La Düsseldorf name. Two singles were also released from the album - "Mon Amour" and "America".

In 1987 Teldec was acquired by Warner Bros. Records, and the new label head Jürgen Otterstein stopped production of Néondian as well as the three La Düsseldorf albums. In the 1990s Dinger re-released the album on Captain Trip Records in Japan, including a remodelled cover and booklet. In 2006 when Warner Bros. finally agreed to release the three La Düsseldorf albums on CD, Néondian was re-released under its original name "Mon Amour" with several bonus tracks. This, too, was cancelled after six months in print due to copyright issues.

== Track listing ==
All titles written by Klaus Dinger, except where stated otherwise.

Teldec and Captain Trip Releases

1. "Mon Amour" - 8:56
2. "Pipi AA" - 4:10
3. "Néondian" - 7:58
4. "America" - 5:40
5. "Cha Cha 2000|85" - 7:17
6. "Jag Älskar Dig" - 6:25

Warner Bros. Release (as "Mon Amour" by "la-duesseldorf.de")

1. "Mon Amour" - 8:56
2. "America" - 5:40
3. "Jag Älskar Dig" - 6:25
4. "Néondian" - 7:58
5. "Pipi AA" - 4:10
6. "Koksknödel" - 5:32 (Klaus Dinger, Thomas Dinger, originally released on the "Ich Liebe Dich" single)
7. "Cha Cha 2000|85" - 7:17
8. "Ich Liebe Dich" - 6:26 (originally released on the "Ich Liebe Dich" single)
9. "Geld 2006 (Internet Warm-Up Version)" - 5:02 (remix of "Geld" from Viva featuring Herbert Grönemeyer)

== Personnel ==
Original album

- Raoul Walton - bass (tracks 1, 3, 4, 6)
- Charly T. Charly [a.k.a. Manfred Therstappen] - drums (tracks 1, 3, 4, 6)
- Klaus Dinger - guitar (tracks 2–6)
- Rudige "Spinello" Elze - guitar (tracks 1, 3, 4)
- Niklaus van Rhejin - synthesizer, piano, tambourine
- Klaus Dinger - vocals
- Klaus Dinger, Conny Plank, René Tinner - production
- Klaus Dinger, Sabine Crittall - artwork

2006 release

- Synthesizer, vocals (Koksknödel) - Thomas Dinger
- Bass, guitar (Geld 2006) - Klaus Dinger
- Drums (Geld 2006) - Hans Lampe
- Vocals (Geld 2006) - Herbert Grönemeyer, Miki Yui
- Remastering - Peter Harenberg, Wolfgang Michels
- Artwork - Klaus Dinger, Sabine Crittall, Anton Corbijn, Harald Tucht, Miki Yui
