= Super (Neu! song) =

Single by Neu!

from the album Neu! 2
- B-side: "Neuschnee"
- Released: 1972 (GER); 19 January 1973 (UK)
- Recorded: Summer 1972
- Studio: Conny Plank's studio, Cologne
- Genre: Krautrock; protopunk; art rock
- Length: 3:07
- Label: Brain Records; United Artists
- Songwriters: Klaus Dinger; Michael Rother
- Producer: Conny Plank

Klaus Dinger singles chronology
"Super" (1972)	"'Isi'" (1975)

"Super" is a single by German band Neu!, released in 1972. It failed to chart and has never been re-released, but has become a collector's item due to the rarity of the original 7-inch vinyl. After the single's recording both the A and B side tracks were added to the album Neu! 2, which was released the following year.

== Recording, release and remixing ==
Both tracks were recorded quickly at Conny Plank's studio in Cologne during the summer of 1972, six months after the release of Neu!'s debut album. Brain were pessimistic about the single's chances, and had to be convinced to release it by Dinger and Rother. When it was released, it was backed by only minimal promotion, and predictably failed to make any impact on the German music charts (though some Krautrock acts – such as Can – did have successful singles in the early '70s).

When Dinger and Rother returned to the studio in early 1973 to record Neu! 2, they decided to fill the second side of the new album with tape manipulated remixes of the "Super/Neuschnee" single. There have been several conflicting explanations as to why this was done, the most quoted being Dinger's assertion that:

When the money ran out, I got the idea of taking the single, play around with it and put the results on side 2 of the album.

However, this has been refuted by Michael Rother, who claims that the second side was made to aggravate their record label, who they felt had insufficiently promoted the original release of the "Super/Neuschnee" single, and not as a result of financial problems. Either way, the second side of the album was ill-met by fans who thought, according to Rother, that "we were making fun of them." This issue contributed to the widening gap between Dinger and Rother, both creatively and personally. Dinger later said of the issue:

[The second side of Neu! 2] was absolutely my idea. I came from that world, Pop Art thinking. Michael did not like the idea. These days he claims that everything in NEU! was 50/50. Financially: yes. Creatively: no. He was always very conventional.

The single was also released in the UK on the United Artists label with a different cover.

== Track listing ==
All tracks composed by Klaus Dinger and Michael Rother.

1. "Super" – 3:07
2. "Neuschnee" – 3:59

== Personnel ==
- Klaus Dinger – drums, vocals
- Michael Rother – bass, guitar
