= Live as Hippie-Punks =

Die Engel des Herrn

Live album by Die Engel des Herrn
- Released: 1995
- Recorded: 21 June 1993
- Label: Captain Trip Records, L.S.D.
- Producer: Klaus Dinger

Klaus Dinger chronology
Die Engel des Herrn (1992)	Die Engel des Herrn (1995)	Neu! 4 (1995)

Live as Hippie-Punks (styled as LIVE! AS HIPPIE-PUNKS) is a 1995 live album by the band Die Engel des Herrn. It was recorded at a 1993 concert in Düsseldorf which was the band's final performance, as they split up immediately following the concert. When Klaus Dinger signed to the Japanese record label Captain Trip Records in 1995, the recording was made into a live album and released (bearing the same "L.S.D." imprint as the band's debut album although being marketed only by Captain Trip).

== Concert ==
Following a succession of personal tragedies related to the band (including the deaths of Dinger's father and Klaus Immig's son) and their failure to secure the support of a major record label, the decision was made to split up. The three band members organised a final concert at Malkasten in Düsseldorf, in which they were supported by bass guitarist and double bassist Konstantin Wienstroer and slide guitarist Dirk Flader.

The set list includes a mixture of songs from Die Engel des Herrn's debut album and the La Düsseldorf album Viva. The D.E.D.H. songs differ greatly from their studio versions; three are exclusive to this album. The version of "Cha Cha 2000" on the album is notable for its free-form middle section, featuring Wienstroer's double bass as well as a variety of tuned percussion instruments.

== Release ==
"Live as Hippie-Punks" was released two years after the concert by Captain Trip Records, Tokyo. It was the first of many Klaus Dinger albums to be released on this label, and Dinger's first official live album. It was also the last album to bear the "L.S.D." imprint Dinger had adopted in 1992, although it was an L.S.D. release only in name. The concert represents Dinger's last recorded performance with Gerhard Michel (who subsequently formed trance band "Musiccargo" with Gordon Pohl) and his first with Wienstroer and Flader (who accompanied him on his 1996 Japanese tour). "Live as Hippie-Punks" was the first Dinger album not to be released in LP format.

== Track listing ==
All tracks written by Klaus Dinger except where indicated.

1. "Intro" - 0:50
2. "Viva" - 5:24
3. "S.O.S." - 2:06 (Klaus Dinger, Gerhard Michel)
4. "Bitte, Bitte '93!" - 4:13 (Michel)
5. "The Song" - 10:54
6. "The Waltz '93" - 6:33 (Michel)
7. "Somewhere" - 3:48
8. "Cha Cha 2000" - 26:18
9. "Little Angel" - 5:39
10. "Tschüs" - 12:37

== Personnel ==
Die Engel des Herrn

- Klaus Dinger - artwork, bells, electronics, guitar, harmonica, percussion, production, remastering, vocals
- Klaus Immig - drums
- Gerhard Michel - bells, guitar, vocals

others

- Bernd Bruhns - photography
- Dirk Flader - slide guitar
- Ken Matsutani - artwork
- Marion Paas - photography, production
- Konstantin Wienstroer - bass, contrabass
