= Neu! 4 =

1995 studio album by Neu!

Studio album by Neu!
- Released: 17 October 1995
- Recorded: October 1985 – April 1986
- Length: 58:01
- Label: Captain Trip Records
- Producer: Neu!

Neu! chronology
Neu! '75 (1975)	Neu! 4 (1995)	Neu! '72 Live in Dusseldorf (1996)

Klaus Dinger chronology
Live As Hippie-Punks (1995)	Neu! 4 (1995)	Neu! '72 Live in Dusseldorf (1996)

Neu! 4
Review scores
Source	Rating
AllMusic	2.5/5 stars

Neu! '86

Studio album by Neu!
- Released: 10 May 2010 (Boxset); 16 August 2010 (CD)
- Recorded: October 1985 - April 1986
- Length: 44:14
- Label: Grönland Records
- Producer: Neu!

Neu! chronology
Neu! Vinyl Box (2010)	Neu! '86 (2010)

Klaus Dinger chronology
Neu! Vinyl Box (2010)	Neu! '86 (2010)	Japandorf (2013)

Singles from Neu! '86
- 1. "Crazy" Released: 17 April 2010

Neu! '86
Review scores
Source	Rating
Chart Attack	3.5/5 stars
The Independent	Positive

Neu! 4 is the fourth and final studio album by krautrock band Neu!, released in October 1995. It was revised and re-released as Neu '86 in 2010.

== Recording ==
Neu! 4 was recorded and mixed between October 1985 and April 1986 at Grundfunk Studio and Dingerland-Lilienthal Studio in Düsseldorf, Germany, and Michael Rother Studio in Forst, Germany. This was the first time Rother and Klaus Dinger had entered a studio together since 1975. However, the sessions were not completed and the planned album was abandoned.

== Release ==
During the 1990s, the first three Neu! albums were available on CD on Germanofon Records, a dubious label allegedly based in Luxembourg who specialized in unauthorized and illegal reissues of otherwise unavailable krautrock albums. Germanofon managed to get a number of their releases, including the three Neu! albums, into mainstream distribution. According to Rother's account, Dinger released Neu! 4 "in an act of despair, so he says" in late 1995 as a response to the bootlegs, which Dinger railed against in the liner notes. Neu! 4 was issued by the Japanese label Captain Trip Records, without Rother's input, knowledge or consent. He only learned what had happened in a telegram congratulating him on the release of the album. Rother, writing in March 2007, described this experience as "a rather painful disaster between Klaus Dinger and myself".

The release of Neu! 4 exacerbated the disagreements between Rother and Dinger, which prevented an official CD release of the first three Neu! albums until 2001. The 2000 agreement between Rother and Dinger which led to the CD releases on Astralwerks in the U.S. and Grönland Records in the UK and Europe called for Neu! 4 to be recalled, and it has been out of print since then.

Despite Rother's continued objection to Dinger's original decision to release Neu! 4 and his oft-stated opinion "that [Neu! 4] isn't a legal/real Neu! album", Rother had no objection to fans buying the CD secondhand and would always leave open the possibility that Neu! 4 could be reissued legally with his consent in the future. Rother and Dinger did attempt to negotiate such a release after the official reissue of the first three albums. In March 2007, Rother termed the failure to reach such an agreement "unfortunate". With Dinger's death in 2008, such an agreement seemed unlikely.

== Neu! '86 ==
In early 2010, Rother announced that he had arrived at an agreement arranged with Dinger's heir, Miki Yui, and had completely remastered the album from original multitrack and master tapes to produce Neu! '86, which he termed "our fourth studio album".

The new album shared several tracks in common with the original release, but contained several new or remixed tracks.

== Track listing ==
=== Neu! 4 (1995) ===
All tracks are written by Klaus Dinger and Michael Rother.

No.	Title	Length
1.	"Nazionale"	3:11
2.	"Crazy"	3:15
3.	"Flying Dutchman"	3:56
4.	"Schöne Welle (Nice Wave)"	4:30
5.	"Wave Naturelle"	5:37
6.	"Good Life (Random-Rough)"	3:51
7.	"'86 Commercial Trash"	3:18
8.	"Fly Dutch II"	5:06
9.	"Dänzing"	5:08
10.	"Quick Wave Machinelle"	3:46
11.	"Bush-Drum"	3:10
12.	"La Bomba (Stop Apartheid World-Wide!)"	5:59
13.	"Good Life"	3:42
14.	"Elanoizan"	3:24

Tracks 5, 6, 7, 8 and 14 were selected by Klaus Dinger from "(then) waste material" and other tracks are from "compilation 4 from 27. April [19]86".

=== Neu! '86 (2010) ===
All tracks are written by Klaus Dinger and Michael Rother.

No.	Title	Neu! 4 title	Length
1.	"Intro (Haydn slo-mo)"	"Nazionale"	0:33
2.	"Dänzing"	"Dänzing"	5:05
3.	"Crazy"	"Crazy"	3:14
4.	"Drive (Grundfunken)"	new track	5:13
5.	"La Bomba (Stop Apartheid World-Wide!)"	"La Bomba (Stop Apartheid World-Wide!)"	5:30
6.	"Elanoizan"	"Elanoizan"	2:31
7.	"Wave Mother"	"Wave Naturelle"	4:52
8.	"Paradise Walk"	new track	5:11
9.	"Euphoria"	"Quick Wave Machinelle"	3:57
10.	"Vier 1/2"	"Fly Dutch II" and "Dänzing"	1:01
11.	"Good Life"	"Good Life"	3:41
12.	"November"	"Wave Naturelle"	1:42
13.	"KD"	"La Bomba (Stop Apartheid World-Wide!)"	1:55

== Personnel ==
=== Neu! 4 ===
Neu!

- Klaus Dinger and Michael Rother – producer, recording, mixing, performer, programming
- Klaus Dinger – voice, guitar, OB8, mix, drums, percussion, programs, other stuff
- Michael Rother – Fairlight, synthesizer, guitar, bass, voice, programs, other stuff

Additional personnel

- Gigi – drums (6, 13)
- Konrad – bass (5, 6, 13)
- Jochen and Brigit – voices (12)

Technical credits

- Michael Grund – engineer
- Klaus Dinger – artwork, editing
- Klaus Dinger and Ken Matsutani – front cover
- Thomas Dinger, Klaus Dinger – original photography
- The Editor (Klaus Dinger) – liner notes

=== Neu! '86 ===
Neu!

- Klaus Dinger and Michael Rother – producer, recording, mixing, performer, programming
- Klaus Dinger – vocals, drums, guitar, keyboards
- Michael Rother – guitar, bass, keyboards, Fairlight Music Computer, remix

Additional personnel

- Georg Sessenhausen – drums (3, 4, 8, 11)
- Michael Grund – bass, percussive sounds (8)
- Jochen and Brigit – voices (5)

Technical credits

- Michael Grund – engineer (basic recordings of tracks 3–5, 7, 8)
- Michael Rother – rework of original master and multi-track tapes (July–December 2009)
- Tom Meyer – mastering (Master and Servant, Hamburg, January 2010)
- Klaus Dinger – original artwork front cover
- Walter Schönauer, Miki Yui, Michael Rother – adaptation album artwork 2010
- Michael Rother – Polaroid and Grundfunk studio view
- Klaus Dinger – drawing
- la.dusseldorf.de – portraits from video stills

== Release history ==
Region	Date	Label	Format	Catalogue
Japan	17 October 1995	Captain Trip Records	CD (Neu! 4)	CT CD 020
UK & Europe	16 August 2010	Grönland Records	LP (Neu! '86)	LPGRONIV
UK & Europe	16 August 2010	Grönland Records	CD (Neu! '86)	CDGRONIV
