= Neu! '72 Live in Düsseldorf =

Neu! '72 Live! in Düsseldorf

Studio album by Neu!
- Released: 1996
- Recorded: 6 May 1972
- Genre: Krautrock
- Length: 57:01
- Label: Captain Trip Records
- Producers: Klaus Dinger, Ira Goldsuit

Neu! chronology
Neu! 4 (1995)	Neu! '72 Live! in Düsseldorf (1996)	1972 Live (2009)

Klaus Dinger chronology
Neu! 4 (1995)	Neu! '72 Live in Dusseldorf (1996)	Düsseldorf (1996)

Neu! '72 Live! in Düsseldorf is the final entirely new album released to date by krautrock band Neu!.

It was recorded on 6 May 1972 at the congregation hall of St. Maria Unter Dem Kreuz. Despite the title, it is not a live album in any conventional sense, but instead is a transcription of a cassette tape recording of a rehearsal session. In the liner notes, Klaus Dinger described the recording as a "non-public test/self-audition with Eberhard Kranemann for a series of 6/7 concerts later in '72". The sound quality of the tape and the resulting CD is generally regarded as poor, with clearly audible tape hiss and distortion.

== Overview ==
During the 1990s, the first three Neu! albums were available on CD on Germanafon Records, a dubious label allegedly based in Luxembourg who specialized in unauthorized and illegal reissues (bootlegs) of otherwise unavailable Krautrock albums. Germanofon managed to get a number of their releases, including the three Neu! albums, into mainstream distribution. According to Michael Rother's account, Dinger released the previous album, Neu! 4 "in an act of despair, so he says" in late 1995 as a response to the bootlegs without Rother's input, knowledge or consent. Rother, writing in March 2007, described this experience as "a rather painful disaster between Klaus Dinger and myself".

The release of Neu! 4 exacerbated the disagreements between Rother and Dinger, which prevented an official CD release of the three classic Neu! albums until 2001. Despite this Dinger went ahead with the release of Neu! '72 Live in Düsseldorf in 1996, once again without consulting Rother, further infuriating his former partner in Neu! The CD was issued by the Japanese label Captain Trip Records. A 2000 agreement between Rother and Dinger to finally reissue the first three albums on CD on Astralwerks in the U.S. and Grönland Records in the U.K. called for Neu! '72 Live! In Düsseldorf to be recalled. It has been out of print since then.

In 2010, the recordings were released again in the Neu! Vinyl Box released by Grönland Records. The recordings were heavily edited and remixed by Michael Rother and included as the bonus maxi-single; 6 May 72 - Non-Public Test.

== Reception ==
Professional ratings
Review scores
Source	Rating
AllMusic	1/5 stars

Reviews for this album are almost unanimous in disparaging it. For example, Stewart Mason, writing for AllMusic, stated, in part:

Welcome to the bottom of the Krautrock barrel. A recording of aimless rehearsals for a concert in Dusseldorf on May 6, 1972, that has all the audio fidelity of a malfunctioning Dictaphone, 72 Live! can barely even be labeled "for completists only," because even completists might balk at the sound quality.

Rother and many Neu! fans who support his point of view do not consider Neu! 72 Live! In Düsseldorf to be a real Neu! album.

== Track listing ==
No.	Title	Length
1.	"6 May '72 Part 1"	38:55
2.	"Silence"	11:11
3.	"6 May '72 - Part 2"	8:55

== Personnel ==
Personnel adapted from original liner notes

- Klaus Dinger, Michael Rother, Eberhard Kranemann – performer, composer, improvisations
- Thomas Dinger – recording (cassette), photography
- Klaus Dinger – mastering, editing, artwork, drawing
- Joe Stick - location arranger
- Klaus Dinger and Ira Goldsuit – producer

Musician credits

- Michael Rother – guitar, voice
- Klaus Dinger – drums, voice
- Eberhard Kranemann – bass, voice
