= Romantic Warriors IV: Krautrock =

- DVD cover
- Directed by: Adele Schmidt; José Zegarra Holder
- Written by: Adele Schmidt; José Zegarra Holder
- Produced by: Adele Schmidt; José Zegarra Holder; Jurriaan Hage; Jonathan Jarrett; Doug Curran
- Starring: Irmin Schmidt; Jaki Liebezeit; Malcolm Mooney; Damo Suzuki; Werner "Zappi" Diermaier; Jean-Hervé Péron; Dick Städler; Theo König; Dieter Klemm; Vridolin Enxing; Miki Yui; Wolfgang Flür; Eberhard Kranemann; Harald Grosskopf; Michael Rother; Hans Lampe
- Cinematography: Adele Schmidt; José Zegarra Holder
- Edited by: Adele Schmidt
- Music by: Can; Faust; Floh de Cologne; Neu!; La Düsseldorf; Japandorf; Krautwerk; Electric Orange; Wume; Damo Suzuki's Network
- Distributed by: Zeitgeist Media
- Release date: April 15, 2019 (Part 1)
- Running time: 129 minutes
- Country: United States
- Languages: English; German

Romantic Warriors IV: Krautrock is a trilogy of feature-length documentaries about progressive music written and directed by Adele Schmidt and José Zegarra Holder. RW4 focuses on the progressive rock music from Germany popularly known as Krautrock, although the integration of Krautrock into the progressive rock genre is a purely American notion. In Europe, the conventional wisdom is that Krautrock can be considered at most as the connection between psychedelic rock and progressive rock. The term "Krautrock" was applied after-the-fact by British journalists, and in fact the German bands share very few similarities.

Part 1 deals with bands from the Cologne, Düsseldorf, and Hamburg regions of Germany. Part 2 focuses on bands from Munich, Wiesbaden, Ulm, and Heidelberg (including Guru Guru, Amon Düül II, Xhol Caravan, Embryo, Kraan, Popol Vuh, Witthüser & Westrupp). Part 3 will focus on bands from Berlin and Hamburg (including Tangerine Dream, Klaus Schulze, Günter Schickert, Agitation Free, Conrad Schnitzler, A.R. & Machines, Nektar and some contemporary bands such as Robert Rich & Markus Reuter and Coolspring).

The first DVD was completed with the aid of an Indiegogo campaign in 2018. The second followed the same funding model in 2020.

== Background ==
Adele Schmidt and José Zegarra Holder are co-founders of Zeitgeist Media LLC, a video production company based in Washington, D.C. Schmidt is an adjunct lecturer on Film and Media Arts at American University, as well as other honors. She has won the 2008 Gabriel Award and the 2009 Telly Award. Previous progressive rock documentary films in the series include Romantic Warriors: A Progressive Music Saga (2010), Romantic Warriors II: A Progressive Music Saga About Rock in Opposition (2012) and Romantic Warriors III: Canterbury Tales (2015).

== Synopses ==
=== Part 1 ===
Romantic Warriors IV: Krautrock (Part 1) begins with attempts to define the term "Krautrock" by members of Floh de Cologne, Electric Orange and Stephan Plank (Conny Plank's son). Next a history of the band Can is given by Irmin Schmidt, Jaki Liebezeit and Malcolm Mooney. Vintage performance footage is interspersed with discussions of their albums Monster Movie and Delay 1968. After Malcolm leaves, Damo Suzuki is interviewed about Tago Mago and the band's desire to create a music not based on American rock of the period. The albums Ege Bamyasi and Future Days are discussed, then Damo left and Can recorded Soon Over Babaluma without a vocalist. Can's engineer describes Landed, their first album in a multi-track studio and how this changed their sound. Rosko Gee and Rebop Kwaku Baah further added to Can's evolution. Next Damo Suzuki's Network is featured, with live footage and a discussion with Damo on how he works with different musicians wherever he tours.

A portrait of Floh de Cologne follows, where they claim they were not musicians but actors pretending to be musicians.

Kraftwerk is profiled next, with Wolfgang Flür and Eberhard Kranemann interviewed. Michael Rother and Stephan Plank talk about Kraftwerk, and their albums Autobahn, Radio-Activity, Trans-Europe Express and The Man-Machine are shown and described. Krautwerk, a contemporary duo of Harald Grosskopf and Kranemann is featured next, with interviews and performance footage.

A brief return to Floh de Cologne is followed by the story of Neu!, with Rother and Plank describing their respective roles. Neu!'s three albums are described, and this leads into a profile of La Düsseldorf. Hans Lampe describes the albums and the tensions that led to an early breakup. Next the band Faust is extensively profiled, with Werner "Zappi" Diermaier and Jean-Hervé Péron interviewed at length. Their history, and the influence of their producer Uwe Nettelbeck, are detailed. Collaborations with Slapp Happy and Tony Conrad are described, along with their passing from Polydor Records to Virgin Records to Table of Elements Records. Finally performance footage and interviews with the contemporary Krautrock-influenced duet Wume is shown. A final goodbye from Floh de Cologne closes this first episode of the Krautrock trilogy.

A companion DVD, entitled Got Krautrock? Romantic Warriors IV: Special Features DVD, was released May, 2019 with additional interview footage and unused performance footage.

=== Part 2 ===
Romantic Warriors IV: Krautrock 2, the second disc in the trilogy, was released March 1, 2021 and begins with footage from the Internationale Essener Songtage festival of 1968, the first major rock and pop music festival in all of Europe. Frank Zappa and The Mothers of Invention performed, as well as Tangerine Dream, Amon Düül II, Xhol Caravan, Guru Guru, Frumpy, The Moody Blues, The Fugs and others. It was organized by Rolf-Ulrich Kaiser, a German promoter, producer and record label owner who would go on to become a central figure in the development of "Krautrock." The Freeman brothers, Alan and Steve, are interviewed next. From their home in Leicester England they opened Ultima Thule record store, published Audion magazine, and chronicled Krautrock in a series of definitive books.

The film turns to performance footage of Amon Düül II (reunion band, 2016), followed by a history of the band as told through new interviews with singer Renate Knaup and guitarist Chris Karrer. Intercut with the interviews is extensive live footage of the band from 1975 and 2016. Amon Düül was originally formed as a hippie commune during the time of the West German student movement and the May 68 student riots in France. The commune ended up splitting into a political wing Amon Düül and a musical wing Amon Düül II.

Xhol Caravan/Soul Caravan/Xhol is featured next, with drummer/leader Gilbert 'Skip' van Wyck, an American living in Germany. Period photos and recordings detail the evolution of the band from soul music to psychedelic music between 1966-1972. The influence of LSD is discussed without guile or apology.

Witthüser & Westrupp are the third profiled band. Initially a busking folk duo, Walter Westrupp describes their association with Rolf-Ulrich Kaiser, Sergius Golowin and Timothy Leary. They were one of the first bands signed to Kaiser's Ohr Records.

The fourth band up is Guru Guru and its leader Mani Neumeier. Performance footage from 2016 and period photos combine with stories of their origin in the Irène Schweizer band and Guru Guru Groove Band. Neumeier is featured extensively, describing his evolution as a drummer and the various incarnations of his band, which is still active. Like Chris Karrer and Skip van Wyck, he was heavily inspired by Jimi Hendrix's appearances in Germany, as well as the Essener Songtage festival. An interview with Zappa about the festival is featured.

Footage of the yearly Finkenbach festival in Germany, curated by Neumeier, leads into a profile and interview with Electric Orange, a contemporary Krautrock-influenced band.

Popol Vuh is described in 1974 interviews with Florian Fricke for WDR, plus a long new interview with guitarist Daniel Fichelscher. Album covers, music samples and period photos intersperse the interviews, talking about how the band evolved from purely electronic music to acoustic music to spiritual music to film soundtracks for Werner Herzog. Renate Knaup made seven records with Popol Vuh.

Kraan closes out the DVD with 2016 performance footage and interviews with bassist/leader Hellmut Hattler. Hattler shows the album covers and describes his efforts to keep the band together since 1970. Kraan bridges the gap between Krautrock and jazz fusion.

A companion DVD, Got Krautrock 2?, was released simultaneously with the second volume of the Krautrock trilogy. It contains additional performance footage by Amon Düül II, Guru Guru, Kraan and Walter Westrupp, as well as unused interviews with Renate Knaup, Mani Neumeier, Hellmut Hattler and Skip van Wyck (Xhol Caravan).

=== Part 3 ===
The last disc in the trilogy is scheduled for release in 2024. It will focus on Berlin and Hamburg bands.

== Reception ==
Extensive reviews of the Romantic Warriors films have been posted on the producers' website (https://www.progdocs.com/reviews/), including:

- Progmistress Raffaella Berry wrote: "Although the deep poignancy that pervaded Canterbury Tales also emerges in Krautrock 1, the documentary never lingers too long on feelings of loss, but celebrates the unbounded vitality of the movement and its protagonists. In many ways, as the film shows with unrelenting clarity, Krautrock ran counter to the original prog movement, being closer in nature to punk and new wave than to Yes and ELP, though equally ambitious in its outspoken goal of creating a kind of music that was uniquely German. The film works both as an introduction for those who are still unfamiliar with the movement, and as a fascinating insight into its development for those who are already invested in it. Whether it will be enough to convert any unbelievers remains to be seen. In any case, even if the music may not be everyone's cup of tea, Krautrock 1 is a must-see not only for fans of progressive music, but also for those interested in the history and culture of post-war Europe." About Part 2 she writes: "From the trippy, spaced-out offerings of Amon Düül II and Xhol Caravan to the intricate, bass-driven jazz-rock of Kraan, through the weird psych folk of Witthüser & Westrupp, Guru Guru’s forays into free jazz and avant-garde, and Popol Vuh’s haunting, ethnic-tinged mysticism, the film spotlights the stunning diversity of the Krautrock scene…Krautrock 2 is essential viewing for anyone interested not just in the music, but also the history and culture behind it. It will, however, provide a rewarding viewing experience to everyone – even to committed fans of very different subgenres of progressive rock. On a personal level, both Krautrock films have helped me to gain an appreciation of the music that had previously eluded me. Now we can only steel ourselves to wait patiently for 2023, when Krautrock pt. 3 – dedicated to the Berlin scene – is slated to be released."
- Sid Smith, in Prog magazine, wrote: "There really should be a Prog award handed out to filmmakers Adele Schmidt and Jose Zegarra Holder for their incredible work in documenting progressive music's origins and development. Having already focused on the successors to the classic bands of the '70s, the RIO movement and the historical and current strands of the Canterbury scene, their affectionate gaze has now turned to Germany's heroes. Detailing the anarchic collision between the avant-garde impulses of the art scene, agit-prop theatre and a defiant pushback away from US dominance in pop and rock culture, the distinctive world they created is explored via a series of fascinating, insightful interviews with several sonic pioneers including Michael Rother, Irmin Schmidt, Faust's Jean-Hervé Péron and Kraftwerk's Wolfgang Flür. Allowing them and several others the space to relate first-hand experiences, simply and directly without any of the jarring editorial leaps that so often mar the rockumentary format, gives this history an authoritative feel. Sympathetically interspersed with rare footage and, where applicable, some superb contemporary performances, this two-hour installment of the Romantic Warriors series eschews gratuitous nostalgia while bearing witness to an innovative movement." Of Part 2 Sid wrote: “Filmmakers Adele Schmidt and Jose Zegarra Holder are tenacious in their ongoing quest to meticulously document progressive music’s various tributaries. Every bit as enthralling and exhaustive as their previous explorations of Rock In Opposition and the Canterbury Scene, this second installment of a projected trilogy covering Krautrock spends more than two hours on the bands that emerged in Southern Germany including Xhol Caravan, Amon Duul II, Guru Guru, Kraaan and many others."
- Lee Henderson, in bigbeautifulnoise, wrote: "The fourth film project in the Romantic Warriors progressive music saga series by Adele Schmidt and Jose Zegarra Holder, appears to be the most expansive and info packed subject yet (the results of Part II & III will confirm that). I cannot help but think that with Germany being Schmidt's birthplace, her connections and ability to dig into the background and realization of this all important subject, is why the project has turned out so superior. No book or previous film on the topic comes close to the broad and insightful minutes of the KRAUTROCK Part I."
- Peter Thelen, at Exposé Online, wrote: "The film begins with a lengthy section on the group Can, and features interview clips and some excellent footage and stills of the band in their earliest days with all the original band members including singer Malcolm Mooney, who together with Irmin Schmidt shed plenty of light on the band’s formation and earliest days. Mooney’s departure is covered as well as the recruitment of new singer Damo Suzuki, and follows the band through their classic period (Tago Mago through the mid-70s) as well as the later 70s when ex-Traffic guys Rosko Gee and the late Reebop Kwaku Baah joined the lineup, through the band’s eventual dissolution; an additional segment focusing on Damo Suzuki’s Network finishes that first lengthy but very worthwhile segment. Another section focuses on the origins of Kraftwerk, from the forerunner band Spirit of Sound, the split of the original Kraftwerk between the first and second LPs, and subsequent successes with albums like Autobahn and Radio Activity, most taken from an excellent interview with Wolfgang Flür, who explains why, as their music became more and more programmed, he felt he had no purpose within the group, and split following The Man Machine. A third major section focuses on the band Faust, including interviews and footage with the original band, explaining the chance that major label Polydor took signing them for two albums, and then Virgin signing them for the next two albums, as well as how their collaboration with Tony Conrad for Outside the Dream Syndicate came about, a very interesting story. This is a long film, about two hours and ten minutes total, so have a good supply of popcorn ready, you are bound to see many clips and interviews that have never been seen before!"
- Charles Snider of Strawberrybricks.com wrote: "Like the other movies in this series, Romantic Warriors - A Progressive Music Saga are not superficial documentaries. They are intimate conversations directly with the artists about their history, their music, and their stories. Essential viewing for all progressive music fans!"
- Mike Huhman at ProgArchives writes: "These documentaries are truly addictive as it only makes you want to know more and explore artists that you have heard of but possibly haven’t actually heard. Guru Guru for example is a band I have heard a couple albums but haven’t really explored thoroughly. Zeitgeist Media has produced nothing less than visual aphrodisiacs that will whet your appetite to explore the scene even further and if you were lucky enough to live through those glorious times, to transport you back to when the magic was in action and then reel you back to the present to find out where these musicians have landed in the brave new world. I love these so much and can only hope that this series continues to infinity because there are so many tales in the world of progressive rock to tell and nobody does it better than Adele Schmidt and José Zegarra Holder. Bravo!”

== Romantic Warriors series ==
- Romantic Warriors: A Progressive Music Saga (2010)
- Romantic Warriors II: A Progressive Music Saga About Rock in Opposition (2012)
- Romantic Warriors III: Canterbury Tales (2015)
- Romantic Warriors IV: Krautrock (2019, three parts)
