= Japandorf =

Studio album by Klaus Dinger + Japandorf
- Released: 25 March 2013
- Recorded: 2007–8
- Genre: Krautrock, post-punk, pop
- Label: Grönland Records
- Producer: Klaus Dinger

Klaus Dinger chronology
Neu! '86 (2010)	Japandorf (2013)

Singles from Japandorf
- 1. "Immermannstraße" Released: 11 January 2013; 2. "Udon" Released: 19 March 2013; 3. "CHA CHA 2008" Released: 10 April 2013

Japandorf is a 2013 album by Klaus Dinger and several other musicians, released under the name "Klaus Dinger + Japandorf" by Grönland Records. It was recorded in the year before Dinger's death on Good Friday 2008 and is the only one of three albums made since 1998 to have been released. It was originally intended to be released as a La Düsseldorf album, but this was blocked at the last minute by Hans Lampe, the band's original drummer.

== Background and recording ==
In July 1998 Dinger disbanded La! Neu? after a final concert in Düsseldorf. After the concert he was approached by a Japanese artist named Masaki Nakao, who had moved to Düsseldorf from Japan in 1989. Over the next ten years Nakao and Dinger became close friends, and in 1999 Nakao introduced Dinger to a group of Japanese musicians living in Düsseldorf. Dinger organised a "festival" at his Zeeland studios for midsummer 1999, to which many of these Japanese musicians were invited (as well as a selection of Dinger's collaborators from 1966 onwards). Dinger was later to say that "Nakao opened the door to Japandorf".

Dinger's first acquaintance was Kazuyuki Onouchi, who had studied traditional Japanese painting at Tama Art University. Onouchi was advised by his lecturer Noi Sawaragi to come to Düsseldorf if he wanted to pursue a career in music, which he subsequently did. Kazu's friend Miki Yui was also present at the Zeeland Festival. She was born in Tokyo, having moved to Düsseldorf in 1994 to pursue a career in installation art, particularly involving ambient sound recordings.

Dinger, Nakao, Yui and Onouchi worked together with Victoria Wehrmeister, Andreas Reihse (both of La! Neu?), Maki Umehara and Thea Djordjadze the following year on an album named as "Pre-Japandorf" and as yet unreleased. Recorded in tandem with this was a second album named "Viva Remix" (a remix of the La Düsseldorf album) to which Dinger, Yui, Nakao and Onouchi contributed along with Herbert Grönemeyer and Renate Dinger. Some time after the year 2000, Dinger and Miki Yui were married.

In 2001 Satoshi Okamoto - a keyboard player from Kobe who had previously worked with J-Pop acts - came to Zeeland to join sessions for Viva Remix. In the same year, Kazu helped Klaus to master the final La! Neu? album "Live at Kunsthalle Düsseldorf". Viva Remix was completed in 2003 and presented to various record labels without avail. The group returned to the studio to improve the album, but Dinger found it difficult to finance these sessions, having to sell much of his studio equipment. In the meantime, Onouchi and Okamoto began working together independently of the rest of the group, forming themselves into a band they named "sub-tle." [hyphen and full-stop part of band name.]

In the summer of 2007 the band travelled to Zeeland to work on a third album named "Japandorf". "Immermannstraße", "Udon" and "Spacemelo" (all songs which had developed over the previous eight years) were fully recorded during this period. Sessions continued in the spring of 2008, in which time "Cha Cha 2008", "Sketch No. 4", "Sketch No. 1_b" and finally "Karnival" were recorded. On 21 March 2008 (Good Friday) Dinger died in his sleep after a sudden heart attack, having almost completed the album. His will left his estate to Miki Yui, and she set about completing the album, writing and recording her vocals to "Spacemelo" amongst other things.

In late 2008 Onouchi and Okamoto released their debut album as sub-tle. - "pre_mary" - on the Düsseldorf "Onpa)))))" label. Over the next three years Kazu and Miki mastered all three of the albums recorded since 1998, and Miki began to digitalise Dinger's video archive (also creating a new website: http://www.klausdinger.com/). In 2010 she collaborated with Michael Rother in the re-release of Neu! 4 and the Neu! Vinyl Box. In 2012, a photo-book covering Dinger's life was published by Slowboy, ISBN 978-3-00-037427-2, and an associated exhibition was held in Düsseldorf. On 25 March 2013 Japandorf was released by Grönland Records. Initial press shots of the album artwork show the La Düsseldorf logo in place of the "Klaus Dinger + Japandorf" sticker, but this was blocked by Hans Lampe, the only surviving member of the original La Düsseldorf.

== Content ==
"Immermannstraße" is named for a street in Düsseldorf's Japanese town which Dinger was introduced to by Kazu and Miki soon after meeting them. The vocals on the song are by Masaki Nakao - it was released as the first YouTube 'single' in advance of the album. "Domou Arigatou" (Japanese for "thank-you very much") was recorded by Miki Yui in a Japanese bookshop on Immermannstraße. "Sketch 1_b" is a jam between Kazu and Klaus recorded in 2008, an early version of which was included on the 2009 compilation/Grönland sampler "Brand NEU!" under the name "Sketch 1_08". Onouchi's synthesizer is noticeably less prominent in the Brand NEU! version than the Japandorf version.

"Udon" is named after a Japanese noodle soup, which Nakao cooked when he joined sessions in Zeeland for "Viva Remix" in 2000. After eating the meal and drinking tequila around the outside campfire, the band returned to the studio where Klaus picked up a guitar and began playing a riff, announcing into the microphone "now Nakao will tell us how to cook udon". Nakao sung the lyrics to "Udon" without any prior preparation, and with a few alterations this is how the song appears on the album. "Kittelback Symphony" is named after Kittelbach, a small river in Unterrath where Dinger grew up.

"Cha Cha 2008" is a cover version of La Düsseldorf's song "Cha Cha 2000", which emerged spontaneously from a jamming session between Kazu and Klaus in 2008, later being overdubbed with vocals and synthesizer. It was the last time Dinger would ever perform the song. "Ai" is a spoken word description of the Japanese word for love, whilst "Sketch No. 4" is another jam between Onouchi and Dinger.

"Spacemelo" originated in a melody Miki Yui wrote for a track of the same on her album "Magina" (released 2010). Dinger played it "upside down (kind of backwards)" on guitar, and built a song around it. Miki Yui wrote and recorded the vocal part after Dinger's death; the song functions as an homage to Dinger. "Karnival" was recorded in February 2008 at the time of the Düsseldorf carnival, to which it refers. "Osenbe" was recorded outside at Zeeland near the campfire, with Nakao and Yui providing vocals over Dinger's acoustic guitar before collapsing into laughter. The final track - "Andreaskirche" - is a recording of church bells at a church in Düsseldorf.

== Reception ==
The album was positively received by most, with Phil Newall of Louder than War calling it "a fitting tribute to Klaus Dinger and a suitable closure for the entire La Dusseldorf project". A review on Julian Cope's Head Heritage website describes "Sketch No. 4" as follows—

‘Sketch No. 4’ is another guitar and drum jam between Dinger and Onouchi, starting on one painfully distorted chord, from which it does not progress for the first three minutes. It is a rhythmic thrashing, a baptism of fire. Dinger is just so angry: if you were ever going to headbang to a Dinger track this would be it. We then move onto a two chord format, which feels much less punishing by comparison. Finally, in the closing moments of the jam, the guitar breaks into the most rapturously beautiful four chord motif, releasing all the energy which has built up over the previous nine minutes. This is a climax rivalled only by the twenty minute version of ‘America’ presented on ‘Blue’, and like that song it quite literally sends shivers down your spine. It’s the kind of climax which makes you want to kick doors down or destroy a hotel room. It’s the real stuff, the eye watering distillation of sixty years of rock’n’roll in ten minutes. It’s what we've all been waiting for.

The album was the best selling record on Grönland for several weeks after its release.

== Track listing ==
1. "Immermannstraße" - 2:35 (Klaus Dinger, Masaki Nakao, Satoshi Okamoto, Kazuyuki Onouchi, Miki Yui)
2. "Doumo Arigatou" - 0:36 (Yui)
3. "Sketch No. 1_b" - 4:46 (Dinger, Onouchi)
4. "Udon" - 5:10 (Dinger, Nakao, Okamoto, Onouchi)
5. "Kittelbach Symphony" - 5:26 (Dinger, Okamoto, Onouchi)
6. "CHA CHA 2008" - 12:36 (Dinger)
7. "Ai" - 0:12 (Dinger)
8. "Sketch No. 4" - 10:10 (Dinger, Onouchi)
9. "Spacemelo" - 5:36 (Dinger, Okamoto, Onouchi, Yui)
10. "Karnival" - 4:11 (Dinger, Onouchi)
11. "Osenbe" - 3:00 (Dinger)
12. "Andreaskirche" - 0:32 (Yui)

== Personnel ==
Japandorf

- Klaus Dinger - bass, (tr. 1, 4, 5, 9 & 10), guitar (tr. 1, 3-6 & 8-11), vocals (tr. 6, 7 & 10)
- Masaki Nakao - percussion (tr. 5), vocals (tr. 1, 4 & 11)
- Satoshi Okamoto - keyboard (tr. 1 & 9), piano (tr. 4 & 5)
- Kazuyuki Onouchi - bass (tr. 8), drums (tr. 1, 3-6 & 8-10), engineering, mixing, synthesizer (tr. 3 & 6)
- Miki Yui - artwork, percussion (tr. 5), recording (tr. 2 & 12), synthesizer (tr. 6), vocals (tr. 1, 4, 6, 9 & 11)

Non-musicians

- Kai Blankenberg - mastering
- Walter Schönauer - artwork

== Filmography ==
- 2019: Romantic Warriors IV: Krautrock (DVD)
