= Neu! '75 =

Neu! 75

Studio album by Neu!
- Released: February 1975
- Recorded: December 1974 – January 1975
- Genres: Krautrock; kosmische musik; experimental rock; psychedelic rock; proto-punk
- Length: 42:33
- Labels: Brain, United Artists
- Producers: Conny Plank, Neu!

Neu! chronology
Neu! 2 (1973)	Neu! 75 (1975)	Neu! 4 (1996)

Klaus Dinger chronology
Neu! 2 (1973)	Neu! 75 (1975)	La Düsseldorf (1976)

Singles from Neu! 75
- 1. "Isi" Released: 1975

Neu! 75 is the third studio album by the German krautrock band Neu!, released in February 1975 on Brain Records. It was recorded and mixed at Conny Plank's studio between December 1974 and January 1975. The album was officially reissued on CD on 29 May 2001 by Astralwerks in the US and Grönland in the UK.

== Overview ==
This album saw Neu! regroup after a few years' hiatus, during which time Michael Rother had worked with Cluster as the supergroup Harmonia. By this time, Rother and bandmate Klaus Dinger had somewhat diverged in their musical intentions for the band, with Dinger preferring a more aggressive, rock-influenced style than Rother's ambient predilections; the two compromised, and the resulting album showcases both sounds. Side one of the record, which reflects Rother's preferences, was recorded as a duo. On side two, Dinger switched from drums to guitar and lead vocals, with his brother Thomas Dinger and Hans Lampe double drumming; following the dissolution of Neu!, the Dinger brothers and Lampe would form La Düsseldorf. On both sides, the use of keyboards and phasing effects increased compared to the band's earlier records. Fact described the album's sound as "spartan psych-rock set to power driven drum tracks," while Thomas Jerome Seabrook identified it with kosmische Musik.

The track "Hero" inspired many musicians of the time, including John Lydon of the Sex Pistols, and is considered an example of proto-punk. David Bowie also alluded to the track with the title of his album "Heroes" and its title track. Negativland, themselves named after a song on Neu!'s first album, named their record label Seeland after the song of the same name on Neu! '75.

== Reception ==
Professional ratings
Review scores
Source	Rating
AllMusic	4.5/5 stars
The Austin Chronicle	3.5/4 stars
Pitchfork	8.5/10
NME	10/10
Q	5/5 stars
Rolling Stone	4/5 stars

In 1979, NME critic Andy Gill gave Neu! '75 a perfect score. Reflecting that the band "took the repetitive pulse of rock, stretched it out and wove lush, shifting layers of sound over the framework to produce a distinctive, hypnotic music which, whilst undeniably rock, was definitely outside-looking-in," he stated that this style reached its "full fruition" on the "pivotally important" album. He considered side two "damn-near perfect as makes no difference, an achievement which exhausts superlatives," and the first side "less immediate but only slightly less satisfying: evocative, entropic, hot-summer-daze music which balances — and is even more successfully 'ambient' than — side two's sweaty nightclub pulse".

Ben Sisario of The New York Times described the album and its predecessors as "landmarks of German experimental rock".

== Track listing ==
All tracks are written by Klaus Dinger and Michael Rother.

Side one
No.	Title	Length
1.	"Isi" (phonetically: "Easy"; also an abbreviation commonly used in German-speaking countries for the name Isabella)	5:06
2.	"Seeland" ("Sea Land" or "Lake Land"; also the name of various locations - "Neuseeland" is the German name for New Zealand)	6:54
3.	"Leb' Wohl" ("Farewell")	8:50

Side two
No.	Title	Length
4.	"Hero"	7:11
5.	"E. Musik" ("Serious Music", a contraction of ernste Musik, as opposed to "entertainment music", Unterhaltungsmusik)	9:57
6.	"After Eight" (Refers to the number "9", in German "neun".)	4:44

== Personnel ==
Neu!

- Michael Rother – electric guitar, bass guitar, keyboards, vocals
- Klaus Dinger – drums (side 1); electric guitar (side 2), vocals
- Thomas Dinger – drums (side 2)
- Hans Lampe – drums (side 2)

Additional personnel

- Konrad "Conny" Plank – producer, engineer
