= Neu! 2 =

Studio album by Neu!
- Released: 1973
- Recorded: January 1973
- Genres: Krautrock; experimental rock; proto-punk
- Length: 42:14
- Labels: Brain, United Artists
- Producers: Conny Plank, Neu!

Neu! chronology
Neu! (1972)	Neu! 2 (1973)	Neu! '75 (1975)

Klaus Dinger chronology
Neu! (1972)	Neu! 2 (1973)	Neu! '75 (1975)

Singles from Neu! 2
- 1. "Super/Neuschnee" Released: 1972

Professional ratings
Review scores
Source	Rating
AllMusic	4/5 stars
The Austin Chronicle	4/4 stars
Pitchfork	7.5/10
PopMatters	positive
Q	3/5 stars
Rolling Stone	3/5 stars
Martin C. Strong	8/10

Neu! 2 is the second studio album by the krautrock band Neu!. It was recorded in January 1973 and mixed in February 1973, both at Windrose-Dumont-Time Studios in Hamburg, West Germany, and released in 1973 by Brain Records. It was reissued by Astralwerks in the US and by Grönland in the UK and Europe on 29 May 2001.

Critic Paul Morley included it in a list of the "100 Greatest Albums of All Time" in 2003.

== Overview ==
This album further focused the classic Neu! krautrock sound, with the opening track "Für Immer" being an archetypal example of their style — a forward-driving vamp propelled by Klaus Dinger's motorik drumming and Michael Rother's layered guitars. Pitchfork described the album as featuring a proto-punk sound, while Fact labeled it "spartan psych-rock set to power-driven drum tracks."

Side 2 of the record caused consternation at the time. Neu! had run out of money to finish recording the album, so the second side consists entirely of their previously released single "Neuschnee/Super", manipulated at various playback speeds on a record player and a cassette recorder. Critics at the time dismissed this as a cheap gimmick. While it was born of necessity, it was entirely in keeping with Neu!'s pop art aesthetics, taking a "readymade" sound object and re-presenting it with a series of manipulations, and also in keeping with the way Neu! deconstructed and pared down rock music. Dinger subsequently pointed to side 2 as being a prototype of the multiple remixes which typically accompany contemporary pop singles.

== Legacy ==
Ben Sisario of The New York Times described the album, along with Neu! and Neu! 75, as "landmarks of German experimental rock".

"Super 16" appears in the films Master of the Flying Guillotine and Kill Bill.

== Track listing ==
All tracks are written by Klaus Dinger and Michael Rother.

Side one
No.	Title	Length
1.	"Für Immer" ("Forever")	11:17
2.	"Spitzenqualität" ("Top Quality")	3:35
3.	"Gedenkminute (für A + K)" ("Minute's Silence (For A + K)")	2:06
4.	"Lila Engel" ("Lilac Angel")	4:37

Side two
No.	Title	Length
5.	"Neuschnee 78" ("Fresh Snow 78")	2:32
6.	"Super 16"	3:39
7.	"Neuschnee" ("Fresh Snow")	4:07
8.	"Cassetto" ("Cassette")	1:48
9.	"Super 78"	1:36
10.	"Hallo Excentrico!" ("Hello Excentrico!")	3:44
11.	"Super"	3:11

== Personnel ==
Neu!

- Michael Rother – guitar, bass guitar, keyboards, zither, percussion, electronics, cassette recorder
- Klaus Dinger – drums, percussion, taishōgoto ("Japanese banjo"), 11-string guitar, Farfisa Professional Piano, vocals, electronics, record player

Additional personnel

- Conny Plank – producer, engineer
- Hans Lampe – engineer
