= Individuellos =

Studio album by La Düsseldorf
- Released: 31 December 1980
- Studio: La Düsseldorf Studio
- Length: 40:16
- Label: Nova
- Producer: Klaus Dinger

Klaus Dinger chronology
Viva (1978)	Individuellos (1980)	Néondian (1985)

Singles from Individuellos
- 1. "Dampfriemen" Released: 1980

Professional ratings
Review scores
Source	Rating
Allmusic	2/5 stars

Individuellos is the third album by the German band La Düsseldorf. It was shortly before the time Individuellos was released that La Düsseldorf's piano player Andreas Schell committed suicide. This is marked by a cross next to his credit. His credit for piano on "Das Yvonnchen" is the only musician's credit on the album.

Writers' credits go to Klaus Dinger, Thomas Dinger (Tintarella Di ...), K+T Dinger (Dampfriemen), and Klaus Dinger, Thomas Dinger, Hans Lampe and Andreas Schell for "Das Yvonnchen".

Musically, "Lieber Honig 1981" has nothing in common with NEU!'s "Lieber Honig"; it is an instrumental version of "Menschen". "Sentimental" and "Flashback" are ambient pieces, featuring "Menschen" played backwards.

== Track listing ==
All tracks composed by Klaus Dinger; except where indicated

1. "Menschen 1" – 5:46
2. "Individuellos" – 3:07
3. "Menschen 2" – 2:58
4. "Sentimental" – 4:24
5. "Lieber Honig 1981" – 5:53
6. "Dampfriemen" (Klaus Dinger, Thomas Dinger) – 3:33
7. "Tintarella Di ..." (Thomas Dinger) – 4:40
8. "Flashback" – 3:52
9. "Das Yvönnchen" (Klaus Dinger, Thomas Dinger, Hans Lampe, Andreas Schell) – 6:03
