= Neu! =

German rock band

- Neu! in 2000. From left to right: Klaus Dinger, Michael Rother.

Background information
- Origin: Düsseldorf, Germany
- Genres: Krautrock, electronic rock, experimental rock, proto-punk
- Years active: 1971–1975; 1985–1986
- Labels: Brain, United Artists, Grönland, Captain Trip, Astralwerks
- Spinoff of: Kraftwerk
- Past members: Klaus Dinger; Michael Rother; Eberhard Kranemann; Uli Trepte; Thomas Dinger; Hans Lampe; Konrad Mathieu; Georg Sessenhausen

Neu! (pronounced [nɔʏ]; German for "New!"; styled in block capitals) were a West German experimental and electronic rock band formed in Düsseldorf in 1971 by Klaus Dinger and Michael Rother following their departure from Kraftwerk. The group's albums were produced by Conny Plank, who has been regarded as the group's "hidden member". They released three albums in their initial incarnation—Neu! (1972), Neu! 2 (1973), and Neu! '75 (1975)—before disbanding in 1975. They briefly reunited in the mid-1980s.

Although Neu! had minimal commercial success during their existence, the band are retrospectively considered a central act of West Germany's 1970s krautrock movement. They are known for pioneering the "motorik" beat, a minimalist 4/4 rhythm associated with krautrock artists. Their work has exerted a widespread influence on genres such as electronica and punk.

== History ==
=== 1970–1971: Pre-formation ===
Neu! was formed in 1971 in Düsseldorf as an offshoot from an early line-up of another seminal krautrock band, Kraftwerk, whose early works were also produced by Conny Plank. Drummer Klaus Dinger had joined Kraftwerk midway through sessions for their eponymous debut album. Guitarist Michael Rother was then recruited to the Kraftwerk line-up on completion of the album. (Rother had been playing in a local band called The Spirits of Sound, the line-up of which also included drummer Wolfgang Flür, who would himself go on to join Kraftwerk two years later.)

Kraftwerk co-founder Ralf Hütter left the band at this point to complete his studies; for six months, Kraftwerk consisted of a trio of Rother, Dinger and Florian Schneider. This line-up played sporadic gigs and made a live appearance on German television programme Beat Club. Recording sessions at Conny Plank's Windrose studio were unsuccessful (Rother later attributed the failure to "a difference of temperament"). Dinger and Rother parted company from Schneider and began Neu! with Plank. Hütter rejoined Schneider and the pair continued recording the second Kraftwerk album with Plank.

=== 1971–1975: Main career ===
The band name Neu! ("new!") was inspired by the prevalence of the advertising business in Düsseldorf at the time, according to Dinger, who described it as "the strongest word in advertising" and even owned a pro forma advertising agency himself for the purpose of booking studios. The band's eponymous first album showcased a cover inspired by Andy Warhol's pop art and sold just 30,000 records. Klaus Dinger made use of the Motorik beat which had been pioneered by him and drummer Jaki Liebezeit.

Their second album, Neu! 2, features some of the earliest examples of musical remixes. The duo, excited about recording another album, decided to expand their horizons by purchasing several new instruments. With the money they had left as an advance from the record company, they could record only half an album's worth of material. The company would not increase their advance because the first album did not sell well enough and the label did not see a reason to further finance what was most likely to become a flop. To rectify the lack of material, the band filled the second side with manipulated versions of their already-released single "Neuschnee"/"Super", playing back each song at different speeds and sometimes warbling the music by messing with the tape machine or placing the record off center on the turntable. The songs "Super 16" and "Super 78" (slowed down and sped up versions of the song "Super," respectively) unwittingly became the theme songs to the 1976 martial arts cult classic Master of the Flying Guillotine by Jimmy Wang Yu. This film was later referenced by Quentin Tarantino in Kill Bill Volume 1 by also featuring the track "Super 16".

Dinger and Rother both differed in creative directions which led to their final album of the 1970s, Neu! '75. Side One was Rother's more ambient productions which were similar to the first album, albeit more keyboard-driven while Side Two was Dinger's songs.

To aid with performing on the album (and more importantly, live), Hans Lampe and brother Thomas Dinger were enlisted to help execute more music than was possible by two men. Upon its release, and arguably to this day, Neu! '75 is the most diverse record available from the krautrock scene. While this can be seen as a positive point, the differences in musical direction (as well as personal issues) not only isolated the Dinger/Rother duo, it isolated their already small fan base. Neu! broke up after the release of Neu! '75.

=== 1975–1986: Band inactivity and reunion ===
In 1974, Rother had already collaborated with German electronic duo Cluster, recording as Harmonia an album titled Musik Von Harmonia. In 1975, he recorded a second Harmonia album, Deluxe, and further sessions followed with Brian Eno, which were not released until 1997 as Tracks and Traces. In 1977, Rother started recording as a solo artist. His first three albums; Flammende Herzen (1977), Sterntaler (1978), and Katzenmusik (1979) were recorded with Neu! producer Conny Plank.

Klaus Dinger, his brother Thomas and Hans Lampe formed La Düsseldorf, cited by David Bowie as "the soundtrack of the eighties". The band released three successful albums; La Düsseldorf (1976), Viva (1978) and Individuellos (1981).

Between October 1985 and April 1986, Dinger and Rother tried to rekindle the flame that was Neu! by adding more synthesizers and a slightly more commercial aspect to some compositions, the band sounded like a cross between their old selves and the recent new wave groups. However, they were torn apart again by personal and musical issues.

An example of the sharp contrast between Dinger and Rother was evidenced by such tracks as "Crazy", Rother's attempt at pop, and "'86 Commercial Trash", a Dingerian collage of dialogue and sound effects from Germany's television commercials of that year. The work that took place in these sessions would later resurface as Neu! 4 in late 1995.

=== 1987–2009: Acrimony, CD reissues, Dinger's death ===
Dinger and Rother did not work together during the 1990s. Indeed, there was some degree of bitterness existed between them, not least because Dinger had released a couple of old substandard Neu! recordings on the Japanese Captain Trip label without Rother's knowledge or consent. In late 1995, this label released the previously mentioned Neu! 4 recordings from the 1985–1986 sessions. It also released Neu! '72 Live in Düsseldorf (recorded on 6 May 1972), which comprised poorly recorded rehearsals for some abortive live shows, but notable for the inclusion of Eberhard Kranemann, who had briefly been in Kraftwerk with Dinger.

A 1999 tribute album, entitled A Homage to Neu! (Cleopatra Records), features covers from artists including the Legendary Pink Dots, Download, Autechre, Dead Voices on Air, Khan, System 7, and James Plotkin, as well as an original track from Rother entitled "Neutronics 98 (A Tribute to Conny Plank)". Plank had died in 1987.

For many years the acrimony and legal wrangling between Rother and Dinger prevented their reaching agreement over licensing arrangements to make Neu!'s music available on CD. In the ensuing vacuum, illegal and inferior-quality bootleg CDs (mastered from old vinyl records) were distributed by an outfit called Germanofon.

This situation was finally resolved in 2001, when Rother and Dinger put aside their differences and entered a studio to transfer the three Neu! albums to CD, from the original master tapes (reportedly mastering each album three times). These were produced and released by Grönland Records (licensed to the Astralwerks label in the United States), packaged with stickers featuring rave reviews by notable artists, including Thom Yorke of Radiohead. Following the release of the first three albums, Dinger and Rother tried but failed to agree on a legal release of Neu! 4. Rother called the failure of those negotiations "unfortunate".

Rother has said that he and Dinger had been considering recording a fifth Neu! album, but the idea was aborted after personal disagreements resurfaced between them. Dinger died of heart failure on 21 March 2008. Rother said that he was unaware of Dinger's illness until just before he died.

Rother writes and produces solo albums. Before his death, Dinger was a member of the band La! Neu? (whose name also irritated Rother), as well as collaborating with Miki Yui and band sub-tle. in a project that is unreleased to this date.

=== 2009–present: Brand Neu!, Neu! '86, Hallogallo 2010 ===
On 25 May 2009, the new record label Feraltone released a compilation CD called Brand Neu! containing tracks by many modern artists who credit Neu! as an influence. Most notably, it featured a track from Michael Rother from the previous Neu! homage album (A Homage to Neu!) and a new track by La Duesseldorf.de, one of Klaus Dinger's final recordings before he died. The compilation features both new and established artists from all around the world including Oasis, Primal Scream, Kasabian, School of Seven Bells, Ciccone Youth (Sonic Youth), Holy Fuck and the young band Pets With Pets from Australia. This was to outline the enormous influence of Neu! which spans multiple decades and countries.

The rights to the Neu! back catalogue are jointly owned by Rother, Dinger's estate and Plank's widow, Christa Fast. Rother worked with them to produce a box set that included all of Neu!'s recordings including material that appeared on the Neu! 4 album (now officially released as Neu! '86). Neu! Vinyl Box was released in May 2010 and Neu! '86 followed as a standalone release later that year. The box set included some of the 'live' recordings from 1972 on a maxi single.

In 2010 Rother teamed up with Steve Shelley (of Sonic Youth) and Aaron Mullan (of Tall Firs) for Hallogallo 2010, a live project to present Neu! music and some new pieces. He has since toured sporadically with the German trio Camera, performing the work of Neu!, Harmonia and his own solo music, occasionally with Dieter Möbius of Cluster. Since 2014 he has toured with Hans Lampe and former Camera guitarist Franz Bargmann.

To celebrate the 50th anniversary of the Neu! debut album, Rother played two concerts, Michael Rother & Friends: Celebrate 50 years NEU!. The first in Berlin, on 26 October 2022, and a second concert in London on 3 November 2022.

== Musical style ==
Neu!'s rhythms and sparse atmospherics have been widely influential on genres such as electronica and punk. Their sound was described as "a droning, hypnotic style made up of Mr. Dinger’s simple, perpetual-motion rhythms and Mr. Rother’s fluid guitar effects" by The New York Times critic Ben Sisario. Sisario called their first three albums "landmarks of German experimental rock, a genre that was quickly labeled Krautrock by journalists and fans." AllMusic noted their penchant for "minimalist melodies and lock-groove rhythms."

The band pioneered the "motorik" beat, a minimalist 4/4 beat often used by drummers associated with krautrock. It is characterised by a kick drum-heavy, pulsating groove, that created a forward-flowing feel. It was probably first used by the group on their debut album and was later adopted by other krautrock bands. Dinger himself later referred to it as the "Apache beat".

== Influence ==
Artists such as David Bowie, Brian Eno, Iggy Pop, Siouxsie Sioux of Siouxsie and the Banshees, OMD, Thom Yorke, John Lydon of the Sex Pistols and Public Image Ltd, Sonic Youth, Stereolab, and Tortoise have cited Neu! as an influence. Simple Minds took influence from Neu!'s motorik, repetitive grooves on albums such as Real to Real Cacophony (1979) and Empires and Dance (1980). Siouxsie and the Banshees cited the band in their influences. Joy Division and New Order drummer Stephen Morris has cited Klaus Dinger's drumming as an important influence on him. Japanese experimental group Boredoms cite Neu! as a prominent influence on their later sound, evident in their unique application of tape manipulation remix techniques and driving 4/4 rhythms pioneered by Rother and Dinger.

Negativland would take their name from the 1972 NEU! song of the same name.

Neu! are highly praised in Julian Cope's Krautrocksampler, along with other krautrock artists such as Kraftwerk and Can, and Cope has also written a song called "Michael Rother" which appears on CD2 of the Deluxe edition of the album Jehovahkill.

== Personnel ==
- Klaus Dinger – vocals, drums, guitars, keyboards, koto, taishōgoto, percussion (1971–1975, 1985–1986; died 2008)
- Michael Rother – guitars, bass guitar, keyboards, occasional vocals (1971–1975, 1985–1986)
- Eberhard Kranemann – bass guitar, slide guitar (1972)
- Uli Trepte – bass guitar (1972; died 2009)
- Thomas Dinger – drums (1974-1975; died 2002)
- Hans Lampe – drums (1974-1975)
- Konrad Mathieu – bass guitar (1985–1986)
- Georg Sessenhausen – drums (1985–1986)

== Discography ==
All Neu! albums on Brain Records were reissued in 2001 by Astralwerks and Grönland Records. All Neu! albums on Captain Trip Records have at least in part been re-released as part of the 2010 Grönland Records Vinyl Box.

=== Studio albums ===
Year	Title	Notes
1972	Neu!: Label: Brain Records	
1973	Neu! 2: Label: Brain Records	
1975	Neu! '75: Label: Brain Records	
1995	Neu! 4: Released: 17 October 1995; Label: Captain Trip Records	
2010	Neu! '86: Released: 16 August 2010; Label: Grönland Records	Authorised re-release of Neu! 4 with a different track listing.

=== Compilation, out-take and live albums ===
Year	Title	Notes
1982	Black Forest Gateau: Label: Cherry Red	Compilation album; Contains 2 tracks from Neu! and 4 from Neu! '75
In 1984 Brain Records released a double album putting together Neu! and Neu 2 reissued as a double album. Limited edition on see-through vinyl, also available on marbled multi-coloured vinyl.
1996	Neu! '72 Live in Dusseldorf: Label: Captain Trip Records	Rehearsal recording
2009	Avantgarde History: Released: November 2009; Label: Eberhard Kranemann self-release	CD-R compilation; Featuring 3 unreleased Neu! tracks recorded in the tour that followed the recording of Neu! '72.
2010	Vinyl Box: Released: 10 May 2010; Label: Grönland Records	Box set; Contains all three studio albums, out-takes album Neu! '86, Neu! '72 (live 18-minute maxi-single).; 36-page picturebook, stencil, Neu! T-shirt, and digital download code.
2022	50!: Released: 23 September 2022; Label: Grönland Records	Box set; Contains all three studio albums, Neu! '86 and a tribute album.

=== Singles ===
- 1972 – "Super"/"Neuschnee" (Brain Records)
- 1975 – "Isi"/"After Eight" (United Artists Records)
- 2010 – "Crazy"/"Euphoria" (Grönland Records)
- 2022 - "Hallogallo (Stephen Morris and Gabe Gurnsey Remix)" (Grönland Records)

=== Tribute albums ===
- 2001 – A Homage to Neu! (Cleopatra Records)
- 2009 – Brand Neu!: Tribute to Neu! (Feraltone)
- 2022 – Tribute (Grönland Records; part of 50! box set)

== Videography ==
- Romantic Warriors IV: Krautrock (2019)
