= Neu! (album) =

Studio album by Neu!
- Released: March 1972
- Recorded: December 1971
- Studios: Star Studios, Hamburg
- Genres: Krautrock; experimental rock; psychedelic rock
- Length: 45:51
- Label: Brain
- Producers: Conny Plank; Neu!

Neu! chronology
Neu! (1972)	Neu! 2 (1973)

Neu! is the debut studio album by the German krautrock band Neu!, released in 1972 by Brain Records. It was the first album recorded by the duo of Michael Rother and Klaus Dinger after leaving Kraftwerk in 1971. They continued to work with producer Conny Plank, who had also worked on the Kraftwerk recording sessions.

Upon release, the album was largely ignored internationally but did well in West Germany, selling 35,000 copies. In 2001, the album was reissued by Grönland Records and then licensed to Astralwerks for US distribution. In 2014, Fact named it the 36th best album of the 1970s.

== History ==
Having left an early incarnation of Kraftwerk, Michael Rother and Klaus Dinger quickly began the recording sessions for what would become Neu!. The pair recorded the album across four nights in December 1971 at Star Studios in Hamburg with producer and engineer Conny Plank. Dinger noted that Plank served as a "mediator" between the often disagreeing factions within the band.

According to Dinger, the first two days of the sessions were unproductive until he brought a taishōgoto ("Japanese banjo") to the sessions, a heavily treated version of which can be heard on "Negativland", the first of the album's six tracks to be recorded. It was during these sessions that Dinger first played his famous "motorik" beat, as featured on "Hallogallo" and "Negativland". Dinger claimed never to have used the term "motorik" himself, preferring either "lange gerade" ("long straight") or "endlose gerade" ("endless straight"). He later changed the beat's "name" to the "Apache beat" to coincide with his 1985 solo album Néondian.

The band was christened by Dinger (Rother had been against the name, preferring a more "organic" title) and a pop art style logo was created, featuring italic capitals. Dinger recalled Neu!'s logo:

... it was a protest against the consumer society but also against our "colleagues" on the Krautrock scene who had totally different taste/styling if any. I was very well informed about Warhol, Pop Art, Contemporary Art. I had always been very visual in my thinking. Also, during that time, I lived in a commune and in order to get the space that we lived in, I set up an advertising agency which existed mainly on paper. Most of the people that I lived with were trying to break into advertising so I was somehow surrounded by this Neu! all the time.

== Reception ==
Professional ratings
Review scores
Source	Rating
AllMusic	4.5/5 stars
The Austin Chronicle	3.5/4 stars
Mojo	5/5 stars
NME	8/10
Pitchfork	9.7/10
Q	4/5 stars

Neu! sold well for an underground album at the time, with approximately 35,000 copies sold in West Germany.

In 2001, Q described the album's motorik beat as "krautrock's defining relentless rhythm" and an influence on subsequent ambient music and punk. In 2008, Ben Sisario of The New York Times described the album and its successors as "landmarks of German experimental rock."

American experimental electronic band Negativland named themselves after the Neu! track of the same name.

The track "Hallogallo" provided the name for the Chicago-based indie rock zine Hallogallo, and from there to the local group of artists it documented.

== Track listing ==
All tracks are written by Neu! (Klaus Dinger and Michael Rother).

Side one
No.	Title	Length
1.	"Hallogallo" (Play on "Halligalli", a German slang term for "wild partying", with the word "hallo" being German for "hello")	10:07
2.	"Sonderangebot" ("Special Offer")	4:51
3.	"Weissensee" ("White Lake"; Weißensee is a town in Carinthia, Austria, and a borough of Pankow, Berlin)	6:46

Side two - Jahresübersicht ("Year Overview")
No.	Title	Length
4.	"Im Glück" ("Lucky")	6:53
5.	"Negativland" ("Negative Land")	9:47
6.	"Lieber Honig" ("Dear Honey" or "Preferably Honey")	7:18

== Personnel ==
Neu!

- Michael Rother – electric guitar, bass guitar, bowed bass
- Klaus Dinger – drums, electric guitar, taishōgoto, vocals

Additional personnel

- Konrad "Conny" Plank – production, engineering
