= La Düsseldorf (album) =

Studio album by La Düsseldorf
- Released: June 1976
- Recorded: September–December 1975
- Studio: Conny Plank's, Wolperath, Neunkirchen-Seelscheid
- Genre: Krautrock; proto-punk
- Length: 35:10
- Label: Nova (Germany), Radar (UK)
- Producer: La Düsseldorf, Conny Plank

Klaus Dinger chronology
| Neu! '75 (1975) | La Düsseldorf (1976) | Viva (1978) |

Singles from La Düsseldorf
- 1. "Silver Cloud" Released: November 30, 1976

La Düsseldorf is the first album of the German band La Düsseldorf, released in June 1976 by Nova (Germany) and Radar Records (UK).

== Background and release ==
After Neu! broke up in 1975, Klaus Dinger formed La Düsseldorf with his brother Thomas and friend Hans Lampe, both of whom previously appeared on side two of Neu! '75. They recorded the eponymous album with producer Conny Plank.

On November 30, 1976, La Düsseldorf released "Silver Cloud" as a 7-inch vinyl record single, paired with the song "La Düsseldorf".

The band bought their own studio, principally using the money from the sales of their first record. All La Düsseldorf's albums combined have sold over a million copies.

== Music ==
La Düsseldorf strikes a stylistic compromise between the "art-focused" Neu! and Dinger's "anarchic, noisier inclinations", creating a more mellow, grand, and pop-friendly album. The songs are built on driving, motorik beats, creating a feeling of a "body-reverent trance", and "set under atmospheric swathes of keyboard and guitar, but with more emphasis on vocals than the mostly instrumental Neu! had made room for". The album preserves some of Dinger's "punk instincts" with "pop's vain sheen on top".

According to Stylus Magazine, La Düsseldorf has an impressive range, incorporating "hard-won [sonical] eclecticism": on the first two tracks inching closer to disco and punk, and subtly steering into erudite pop on "Silver Cloud" and "Time". "Silver Cloud" features "careening synths and 'Chu Chu Chu' electric guitars, at once too agile for space rock and too wide and waddling for dance music.

At the start, the song "La Düsseldorf" incorporates an audio recording of an exultant soccer crowd "singing for forty seconds before Dinger begins chanting the song's title". Wilson Neate of AllMusic thought the chant seemed "almost a prescient parody of the brainless variant of punk that would later turn the movement into self-caricature".

== Critical reception ==
Professional ratings
Review scores
| Source | Rating |
|---|---|
| AllMusic | 4.5/5 stars |

Andrews Gaerig, reviewing La Düsseldorf for Stylus Magazine, praised the band for the innovative sound, pushing boundaries of disco and punk music before "the true pinnacle of either genre, thus establishing Dinger as a plugged-in craftsman, if not an out-and-out visionary". Gaerig additionally highlighted that, compared to the "art-focused" Neu!, Dinger is "availing himself commercially" on La Düsseldorf. He singled out "Time" as the album's "masterwork", and regarded "Silver Cloud" as the album's "simplest and cleanest track, though engagingly so". Gaerig compared "Time", beginning at the four-minute mark, to LCD Soundsystem's song "All My Friends".

AllMusic's Wilson Neate felt the album set "a foot in the post-punk era", exemplified by the closing tracks "Silver Cloud" and "Time", which has been "looking forward to the pared-down, monochromatic austerity that would follow punk's color-cartoon demise". Neate chose "Silver Cloud" as his favorite song, comparing its "synths and mechanical rhythms" to David Bowie's Berlin albums.

== Track listing ==
Side one
| No. | Title | Length |
|---|---|---|
| 1. | "Düsseldorf" | 13:17 |
| 2. | "La Düsseldorf" | 4:28 |

Side two
| No. | Title | Length |
|---|---|---|
| 1. | "Silver Cloud" | 8:01 |
| 2. | "Time" | 9:24 |

== Personnel ==
La Düsseldorf

- Klaus Dinger – guitar, vocals
- Thomas Dinger – lighting, percussion, vocals
- Harald Konietzko – bass
- Hans Lampe – electronics, keyboards, percussion, synthesizer
- Nikolaus VanRhein – keyboards, synthesizer

Technical

- Klaus Becker – proofreading
- Dinger Brothers – artwork, stylist
- Gary Hobish – re-issue mastering, remastering
- Stephen Iliffe – liner notes
- Konrad Plank – audio engineer, audio production, engineer, producer
- Nathaniel Russell – re-issue design, re-issue layout
- Filippo Salvadori – re-issue producer
