= Rheinita =

Single by La Düsseldorf

from the album Viva
- B-side: "Viva"
- Released: 1979
- Recorded: 1977–8
- Genre: Krautrock, disco, art rock
- Label: Teldec, Bureau B
- Songwriter(s): Klaus Dinger
- Producer(s): Klaus Dinger

Klaus Dinger singles chronology
"'Silver Cloud'" (1976)	"Rheinita" (1979)	"'Dampfriemen'" (1980)

"Rheinita" is a 1979 single by German band La Düsseldorf. It was the band's most successful single. The success of the single in both its 7" and 12" versions led EMI to offer the band a 1 million DEM advance, should they break their contract with Teldec.

== Recording & release ==
Following the success of their debut album, La Düsseldorf decided to dispense with producer Conny Plank and buy their own studio in Düsseldorf. Viva evolved over several years in the studio, the band now having unrestricted studio access. The album was released in 1978, and was followed the next year by the "Rheinita" single.

Unusually for a hit record it is instrumental (as was Silver Cloud) and over seven minutes long in the full 12" version. Nevertheless it sold well in Germany, some music magazines making it "record of the year". The band were forced to go on tour in support of the single, an enterprise made difficult by the heavily overdubbed nature of their music, and of "Rheinita" in particular. They played a free concert for television, recordings of which are widely available on the internet, in which the band members mimed their parts and danced enthusiastically on stage.

The song itself refers to Klaus Dinger's two great loves – the Rhein, which flows through Düsseldorf, and Anita Heedman, Dinger's girlfriend who had moved to Norway in 1971. The B-side – "Viva" – is vocal, unlike "Rheinita", and features lyrics in English, German, French and Italian.

The single was re-released on CD in 2008 by Hamburg record label Bureau B.

== Track listing ==
All tracks composed by Klaus Dinger.

7" Single and CD

1. "Rheinita" – 4:22
2. "Viva" – 2:52

12" Maxi-Single

1. "Rheinita" – 7:40
2. "Viva" – 2:52

== Personnel ==
- Klaus Dinger – guitar, keyboard, percussion, synthesizer, vocals
- Thomas Dinger – percussion, vocals
- Hans Lampe – drums, percussion
