= Brain Records =

German Krautrock record label

- Parent company: Metronome Musik GmbH
- Founded: 1972
- Founder: Bruno Wendel, Günter Körber
- Status: Inactive
- Distributor: PolyGram Records
- Genre: Krautrock, Kosmische Musik
- Country of origin: West Germany
- Location: Hamburg

Brain was a Hamburg-based record label prominent in the 1970s releasing several important Krautrock records by bands such as Neu!, Cluster and Guru Guru. Many of its more prominent records are currently being reissued on CD by Repertoire Records.

In the middle of 1971, Rolf-Ulrich Kaiser's management style at Ohr caused two of his A&R men, Bruno Wendel and Günter Körber, to leave Ohr and set up their own record company, which they called Brain. Wendel & Korber brought Guru Guru with them from Ohr, and immediately signed Cluster, who had recorded one LP for Philips; they soon recorded and released Cluster II.

Brain was rapidly a success throughout West Germany and much of western Europe, although had little presence in the US. Signings throughout the seventies and into the eighties included Neu!, Cluster, Harmonia, Klaus Schulze, Edgar Froese, Guru Guru, Grobschnitt, Novalis, Jane, Birth Control, Embryo, Popol Vuh, Curly Curve, Scorpions, Electric Sun, Accept and many more.

A later reissue series called Rock On Brain saw many early Brain recordings reissued, although mostly with entirely different sleeves and even album titles. Brain also reissued a number of recordings licensed to their parent company Metronome, such as Amon Düül's first album Psychedelic Underground. Many came out on the M2001 label which is closely linked to Brain.

Brain licensed and issued a number of British releases for the West German market, in this case mainly featuring the original sleeves. These included Greenslade, Caravan, If, Spirogyra, Atomic Rooster, Alexis Korner, Gryphon and Steamhammer. There were of course exceptions - the Brain issue of Atomic Rooster's Nice n Greasy features an entirely different sleeve to the UK issue, and If's Double Diamond didn't receive a UK release at all.

Some Brain releases later proved highly influential. Brain 1004 was Neu!'s eponymous debut Neu!; Brain 1062 was Neu! 75, which undoubtedly contributed to the sound of punk rock.

Körber left in 1976 to start Sky Records, which released much Cluster-related music plus Michael Rother's early solo work, and bands like Streetmark. When he left the labels of Brain LPs changed from green to orange.

== Discography ==
- 1001 – Scorpions – Lonesome Crow
- 1002 – Jane – Together
- 1003 – Gomorrha – I turned to See Whose Voice It Was
- 1004 – Neu! – Neu!
- 1005 – Spirogyra – St. Radigunds – licensed release (UK: B & C, 1042)
- 1006 – Cluster – Cluster II
- 1007 – Guru Guru – Känguru
- 1008 – Grobschnitt – Grobschnitt
- 1009 – Steamhammer – Speech – licensed release (non German band)
- 1010 – Caravan – Waterloo Lily – licensed release (UK: Deram, SDL 8)
- 1011 – Atomic Rooster – Made in England – licensed release (UK: Dawn, DNLS 3038)
- 1012 – Spirogyra – Old Boot Wine – licensed release (UK: Pegasus, 13)
- 1013 – Light – Story of Moses
- 1014 – Gash – A Young Man's Gash
- 1015 – Os Mundi – 43 Minuten
- 1016 – Wolfgang Dauner Group – Rischka's Soul
- 1017 – Creative Rock – Gorilla
- 1018 – Electric Sandwich – Electric Sandwich
- 1019 – Khan – Space Shanty – licensed release (UK: Deram, SLDR 11)
- 1020 – Sameti – Sameti
- 1021 – Thirsty Moon – Thirsty Moon
- 1022 – Alexis Korner – Korner & Snape – licensed release (US: WB, BS 2647)
- 1023 – Embryo – Steig Aus
- 1024 – Spirogyra – Bells, Boots and Shambles – licensed release (UK: Polydor, 2310 246)
- 1025 – Guru Guru – Guru Guru
- 1026 – Spermüll – Spermüll
- 1027 – Greenslade – Greenslade – licensed release (UK: WB, K 46207)
- 1028 – Neu! – Neu! 2
- 1029 – Novalis – Banished Bridge
- 1030 – Cornucopia – Full Horn
- 1031 – Lava – Tears are going home
- 1032 – Jane – Here we are
- 1033 – Atomic Rooster – Nice 'n' Greasy – licensed release (non German band)
- 1034 – Kollektiv – Kollektiv
- 1035 – if – Double Diamond – licensed release (Canada: GRT, 9230-1032)
- 1036 – Embryo – Rocksession
- 1037 – Emergency – Get Out of the Country
- 1038 – Caravan – For Girls Who Grow Plump in the Night – licensed release (UK: Deram, SKLR 12)
- 1039 – Alexis Korner & Snape – Live on Tour in Germany (2LP) – licensed release (non German band)?
- 1040 – Curly Curve – Curly Curve
- 1041 – Thirsty Moon – You'll never Come Back
- 1042 – Greenslade – Bedside Manners are Extra – licensed release (UK: WB, K46259)
- 1043 – Steamhammer – This is... (2LP)
- 1044 – Harmonia – Musik von Harmonia
- 1045 – Yatha Sidra – A Meditation Mass
- 1046 – Various – Krautrock (3LP)
- 1047 – Zabba Lindner & Carsten Bohn – Vollbedienung Of Percussion
- 1048 – Jane – Jane III
- 1049 – Satin Whale – Desert Places
- 1050 – Grobschnitt – Ballermann (2LP)
- 1051 – Klaus Schulze – Black Dance
- 1052 – Emergency – No Compromise
- 1053 – Edgar Froese – Aqua
- 1054 – Caravan – Caravan and the New Symphonia – licensed release (UK: Deram, SKLR 1110)
- 1055 – If – Not just another Bunch of Pretty Faces – licensed release (UK: Gull, 1004)
- 1056 – Release Music Orchestra – Life
- 1057 – Guru Guru – Der Electrolurch (2LP) – Reissue of Känguru (1007) and Guru Guru (1025)
- 1058 – Tasavallan Presidentti – Milky Way Moses – licensed release (Finland/UK: Sonet, SNTF 658)
- 1059 – Jukka Tolonen – Tolonen! – licensed release (Finland: Love, LRLP 47)
- 1060 – Hardcake Special – Hardcake Special
- 1061 – Creative Rock – Lady Pig
- 1062 – Neu! – Neu 75
- 1063 – Tasavallan Presidentti – Lambert Land – licensed release (Finland/UK: Sonet, SNTF 636)
- 1064 – If – Tea Break Over Back – licensed release (UK: Gull, 1007)
- 1065 – Cluster – Zuckerzeit
- 1066 – Jane – Lady Jane
- 1067 – Klaus Schulze – Picture Music
- 1068 – Achim Reichel – Erholung
- 1069 – Eroc – Eroc
- 1070 – Novalis – Novalis
- 1071 – Gryphon – Red Queen to Gryphon Three – licensed release (UK: Transatlantic, TRA 287)
- 1072 – Release Music Orchestra – Garuda
- 1073 – Harmonia – De Luxe
- 1074 – Edgar Froese – Epsilon in Malaysian Pale
- 1075 – Klaus Schulze – Time Wind
- 1076 – Grobschnitt – Jumbo (version en Ingles)
- 1077 – Klaus Schulze – Irrlicht
- 1078 – Klaus Schulze – Cyborg (2LP) – reissue (Kosmische Musik, KM2/58.005)
- 1079 – Thirsty Moon – Blitz
- 1080 – Günter Schickert – Samtvogel – reissue (Sch 33003)
- 1081 – Grobschnitt – Jumbo (version en Aleman)
- 1082 – Tangerine Dream – Alpha Centauri/Atem (2LP) – reissue (Ohr, OMM12 & OMM31)
- 1083 – Release Music Orchestra – Get the Ball
- 1084 – Jane – Fire, Water, Earth & Air
- 1085 – Locomotiv GT – Mindig Magasabra – licensed release (non German band)
- 1086 – Tangerine Dream – Zeit (2LP) – reissue (Ohr, OMM21)
- 1087 – Novalis – Sommerabend
- 1088 – Klaus Schulze – Moondawn
- 1089 – Guru Guru – Tango Fango
- 1091 – Various – Brain history of German Rock (2LP)

=== 60.000 – series ===
- 60.007 – Eroc – Zwei
- 60.008 – Edgar Froese – Macula Transfer
- 60.009 – Thirsty Moon – A Real Good Time
- 60.010 – Schicke, Führs & Fröhling (SFF) – Symphonic Pictures
- 60.019 – Birth Control – Backdoor Possibilities
- 60.031 – Ruphus – Let Your Light Shine
- 60.000 – serie (en Brain naranja)
- 60.039 – Guru Guru – Globetrotter
- 60.040 – Klaus Schulze – Mirage
- 60.041 – Grobschnitt – Rockpommel's Land
- 60.042 – Gate – Live
- 60.047 – Klaus Schulze – Body Love
- 60.053 – To Be – To Be
- 60.055 – Jane – Between Heaven and Hell
- 60.065 – Novalis – Konzerte
- 60.066 – Birth Control – Increase
- 60.068 – Schicke, Führs & Fröhling (SFF) – Sunburst
- 60.078 – Message – Using the Head
- 60.079 – Popol Vuh – Herz aus Glas
- 60.093 – Gate – Red Light Sister
- 60.094 – Novalis – Brandung
- 60.097 – Klaus Schulze – Body Love Vol.2
- 60.104 – Blonker – Die Zeit Steht Still
- 60.105 – Führs & Fröhling – Ammerland
- 60.115 – Release Music Orchestra – Beyond the Limit
- 60.117 – Liliental – Liliental
- 60.120 – Zeus B. Held – Zeus' Amusement
- 60.124 – Jane – Age of Madness
- 60.139 – Grobschnitt – Solar Music Live
- 60.149 – Birth Control – Titanic
- 60.164 – Novalis – Vielleicht Bist Du Ein Clown?
- 60.165 – Message – Astral Journeys
- 60.167 – Popol Vuh – Brüder des Schattens – Söhne des Lichts
- 60.173 – Schicke, Führs & Fröhling (SFF) – Ticket to Everywhere
- 60.185 – Epitaph – Return to Reality
- 60.186 – Anyone's Daughter – Adonis
- 60.187 – Guru Guru Sunband – Hey Du!
- 60.188 – Accept – Accept
- 60.194 – Release Music Orchestra – News
- 60.196 – Electric Sun – Earthquake
- 60.197 – Eroc – Eroc3
- 60.218 – Jane – Sign No. 9
- 60.219 – Novalis – Wer Schmetterlinge Lachen Hort (compilation)
- 60.223 – Führs & Fröhling – Strings
- 60.224 – Grobschnitt – Merry Go Round
- 60.225 – Klaus Schulze – Dune
- 60.240 – Birth Control – Live '79
- 60.242 – Popol Vuh – Die Nacht der Seele
- 60.274 – Epitaph – See You In Alaska
- 60.291 – Grobschnitt – Volle Molle
- 60.000 – serie (en Brain negro)
- 60.353 – Klaus Schulze – Dig It
- 60.354 – Jane – Jane
- 60.365 – Grobschnitt – Ilegal
- 60.385 – Epitaph – Live
- 60.397 – Scorpions – Lonesome Crow (reissue)
- 60.510 – Grobschnitt – Razzia
- 60.513 – Accept – Restless and Wild
- 60.519 – Jane – Germania

=== 80.000 – series ===
- 80.001 – Jane – Live at home
- 80.013 – Various (Jane, Novalis, etc.) – Brain Festival Essen
- 80.014 – Neu! – 2 Originals – Reissue Neu! (1004) and Neu!2 (1028)
- 80.017 – Various (Novalis, SFF, etc.) – Brain Festival Essen 2
- 80.018 – Guru Guru – Live
- 80.023 – Klaus Schulze – X
- 80.048 – Klaus Schulze – Live

=== 200.100 – series ===
- 200.145 – Guru Guru – This Is Guru Guru
- 200.146 – Amon Düül – This Is Amon Duul
- 200.148 – Julie Driscoll – This Is Julie Driscoll
- 200.149 – Brian Auger – This Is Brian Auger
- 200.150 – Wolfgang Dauner – This Is Wolfgang Dauner
- 200.151 – Atomic Rooster – This Is Atomic Rooster
- 200.164 – Caravan – This Is Caravan

=== Albums Sampler ===
- 201.035 – Various (neu, guru guru, release music orchestra, emergence, cluster, grobschnitt, jane, hardcake special) – German Super Rock
- 888 – Various (Neu, Kollektiv, etc.) – German Rock Scene – 1973

== See also ==
- List of record labels
- List of electronic music record labels
