= Motorik =

Musical rhythm

The basic motorik drum beat pattern

Motorik rhythm
A sample of a motorik rhythm

Motorik is the 4/4 beat often used by, and heavily associated with, krautrock bands. Coined by music journalists, the term is German for "motor skill". The motorik beat was pioneered by Jaki Liebezeit, drummer with German experimental rock band Can. Klaus Dinger of Neu!, another early pioneer of motorik, later called it the "Apache beat". The motorik beat is heard in one section of Kraftwerk's "Autobahn", a song composed to convey the feeling of driving on the German highway. It is heard throughout Neu!'s "Hallogallo", from their self-titled album Neu!, and used on all subsequent Neu! albums with differing tempos and variations; Hawkwind reproduced Neu!'s "Hallogallo" motorik beat on the track "Opa-Loka" on their 1975 Warrior on the Edge of Time album.

Some music critics observed that the motorik style conveys a similar sense of forward momentum as the music of Beethoven and Rossini and bears a resemblance to the rhythmic drumming in jazz. They opined that it initially evoked the "glorification of the industrial modern era".

The motorik beat is in 4/4 time, at a moderate tempo. The pattern is repeated in each bar throughout the song. A splash or crash cymbal is often hit at the beginning bar of a verse or chorus. Klaus Dinger emphasized that it was "very much a human beat," adding, "It's essentially about life, how you have to keep moving, get on and stay in motion."

== Etymology ==
The word's use in music journalism may be derived from a punning modification of "motoric", a term long used by music critics to describe relentless ostinato rhythm, or simply from a combination of "motor" and "music" (German: "musik"). In addition, Motorik is the German word for motor skills. The name may derive from the repetitive yet forward-flowing feel of the rhythm, which has been compared to the experience of driving on a motorway.

== Application ==
The drumming style of Moe Tucker, the drummer in the Velvet Underground, has specifically been characterized by music critic Chris Jones as "proto-motorik". Apart from the German krautrock bands, the motorik beat has been used by bands from many different genres, most often in psychedelic rock, post-punk, indie rock, and contemporary non-German "krautrock" bands. The motorik beat was a characteristic feature in the music of Siouxsie and the Banshees through the involvement of drummers Kenny Morris and Budgie. Other notable artists include Joy Division, Beak, the War on Drugs, Electrelane, the Rapture, LCD Soundsystem, King Gizzard & the Lizard Wizard, Squid, Thee Oh Sees, the Modern Lovers, Iggy Pop, Public Image Ltd, Ultravox, Stereolab, Yo La Tengo, Arctic Monkeys, Endless Boogie, Idles, Moon Duo, and Sam Fender.
