= Thomas Dinger =

German musician (1952–2002)

- Born: 28 October 1952; Düsseldorf West Germany
- Died: 9 April 2002 (aged 49)
- Genres: Krautrock, protopunk, art rock
- Occupation: Musician
- Instruments: drums, guitar, vocals
- Years active: 1975-1981; 1999–2002
- Formerly of: Neu! La Düsseldorf; 1-A Düsseldorf

Thomas Dinger (28 October 1952 — 9 April 2002) was a German drummer, singer and songwriter who was active in solo pursuits in addition to having been a member of Neu! and La Düsseldorf, both with his brother Klaus Dinger, and 1-A Düsseldorf.

== Biography ==
=== Neu! and La Düsseldorf ===
Alongside Hans Lampe, Thomas Dinger performed percussions on the second side of the third album, recorded by the Krautrock band Neu!. After Neu! disbanded Dinger co-formed La Düsseldorf, along with his brother Klaus Dinger, Harald Konietzko, and Hans Lampe. Thomas Dinger took parted in the recording sessions for the albums La Düsseldorf album (1976) and Viva (1978), playing percussion and performing vocal parts. Thomas, however, quit the band during the production of Viva, "tired of quarreling endlessly with his imperious brother Klaus", and "promptly set off for the south of France". In early 80s, he wrote several tracks for the La Düsseldorf final album Individuellos (1981).

=== Solo album and reception ===
In 1982 he released his only solo album, Für Mich, which according to a press release by Bureau B, was "imbued with the spirit of La Düsseldorf, yet more measured and melancholic, redolent of the music of Michael Rother or Wolfgang Riechmann". His band mate Hans Lampe recalled that Dinger "wanted to create something by himself, something just for him and nobody else", hence the album title Für mich. It was recorded La Düsseldorf's studio in 1981, with the help of Lampe as co-producer and engineer and asked his brother Klaus to refrain from participating in recording and mixing sessions. The songs prominently feature "layers of synthesizer sounds", and in contrast to his previous contributions characterized by motorik rhythm (4/4 signature), only one song structured in motorik. Two tracks are written in a 3/4 signature.

Hans Lampe fondly recalled the sessions with Dinger, saying: "There was a large balcony to the rear of Thomas's apartment, looking onto a vast, overgrown courtyard. A little park, a verdant oasis in the big city. We sat here often, listening to music, working on the LP and musing on life. Thomas and I complemented each other marvellously, bouncing ideas off each other. Our understanding was so great, the mood was so deep and heartfelt, we thoroughly enjoyed working together."

Chris Roberts, writing for Louder Sound, considered Für Mich to be a Krautrock often overlooked by critics and described it as "lighting-in-a-bottle one-off". Roberts highlighted arty curios. It’s melancholy and beautiful, a hidden treasure.

=== Later career ===
Thomas reunited with his brother on the La! NEU? album Goldregen (1998), recorded in two sessions occurred in 1994 and in March 1995.

Thomas Dinger died in 2002 at the age of 49. On 3 August 2013, Bureau B reissued Für Mich in both CD and LP formats.

== Discography ==
=== Solo albums (as Thomas Dinger) ===
- Für Mich (1982)

=== with Neu! ===
- Neu! '75 (1975)

=== with La Düsseldorf ===
- La Düsseldorf (1976)
- Viva (1978)
- Individuellos (1981)

=== with La! NEU? ===
- Goldregen (1998)

=== with 1-A Düsseldorf ===
- Fettleber (1999)
- Königreich Bilk (1999)
- D.J.F.(2000)
- Live (2001)
- Pyramidblau (2003, memorial album recorded by his bandmates)
