= Klaus Dinger =

German musician

- Dinger in 2000

Background information
- Born: 24 March 1946; Scherfede, Westphalia, American occupation zone in Germany
- Died: 21 March 2008 (aged 61)
- Genres: Krautrock; proto-punk; art rock; post-punk
- Occupations: Musician; carpenter; artist; producer
- Instruments: Drums; guitar; keyboards; vocals
- Years active: 1968–2008
- Labels: Brain; Teldec; LSD; Captain Trip
- Website: klausdinger.com dingerland.de

Klaus Dinger (24 March 1946 – 20 March 2008) was a German musician and songwriter most famous for his contributions to the seminal krautrock band Neu!. He was also the guitarist and chief songwriter of new wave group La Düsseldorf and briefly the percussionist of Kraftwerk.

== 1946–1971: The No, The Smash, and Kraftwerk ==
Klaus Dinger was born in Scherfede, Westphalia, Germany, to Heinz and Renate Dinger on 24 March, 1946. He was their first child.

Before he was a year old, his parents moved from the town, which had been badly damaged by an Allied siege at the end of World War II, to Düsseldorf.

In 1956 he attended Görres Gymnasium School for the first time. During his time there he was part of an a cappella choir, which he had to leave when his voice broke. He was part of the school swing band (as a drummer) despite having no prior musical experience. He left the school with a Mittlere Reife (German equivalent of leaving school at 16), later accusing the school of misinterpreting his "free mindedness" as misbehaviour.

After leaving school in 1963 Dinger began to learn carpentry. He also became more interested in music, and practiced drums with spare bits of wood until he could afford a drum kit. In 1966 he formed a band with friends Norbert Körfer, Lutz Bellman and Jo Maassen: The No. The band was influenced largely by English rock acts such as The Kinks and The Rolling Stones. The band sent a demo tape to EMI but the record label never replied. He also worked in a free jazz ensemble, making what he later called "noise". During a concert in Düsseldorf with this ensemble, he spotted Florian Schneider, with whom he would later work in Kraftwerk, sitting in the audience (Dinger said that Schneider "Had a face I will never forget"). Schneider was at that time part of a free jazz ensemble called Pissoff fronted by another future collaborator Eberhard Kranemann.

In 1966 Dinger also started studying architecture at Krefeld. However, in 1968 he took 6 months leave, after experiencing LSD for the first time, in order to become more proficient as a drummer. In 1969 The No split up and he joined cover band The Smash and began touring southern Germany. During this period he realised that he could make a living as a musician alone, and never returned to his architecture studies.

In Summer 1970 Dinger received a telephone call from Ralf Hütter. Hütter was bandmates with Florian Schneider in Kraftwerk and was three-quarters of the way through recording their debut album. Their previous drummer (Andreas Hohmann) had left to join sister-group Ibliss after only two of the album's tracks had been made. Hütter and Schneider set out to find a new drummer; in the meantime they recorded a third track without the use of a drummer.

Dinger's role would be to record the drum part for the fourth and final track: "Vom Himmel Hoch". Dinger recalls:

...I recorded the drums on side 2. Ralf and Conny Plank, the producer, were very pleased with the results. Florian was away on holiday at the time and when he came back, he didn't like it at all. I recorded the same tracks again and they sounded exactly the same. Florian, however, was very pleased but that's another story, a "Ralf & Florian story".

Having impressed both Hütter and Schneider, Dinger was installed as a permanent member of the band. The homeless drummer moved into the house of Florian's parents, Florian leaving shortly after, but Klaus was kept on as a lodger. Here he met Anita Heedman. Anita, or "Hanni", was a friend of Florian's sister (who died in 2002). Hanni would be Klaus Dinger's girlfriend for most of his time in Neu! and Kraftwerk.

After touring extensively with the band, Ralf Hütter suddenly decided that "he couldn't play anymore" and left the group. This left Schneider and Dinger without a guitarist or bass player. They toured with what Dinger called "a floating line-up" of ever changing musicians.

The line-up settled down somewhat by June 1971, and it stood as Dinger on drums, Schneider on flute and organ, Eberhard Kranemann (Florian Schneider's bandmate from Pissoff) on bass and Michael Rother on guitar, who had been poached from local band Spirits of Sound. Kranemann's talents as a bass player were not always needed and in 1972 the trio of Dinger, Schneider and Rother appeared on German TV show Beat Club.

The performance was different from the Kraftwerk style and is seen by many as a transition from that towards Neu!'s style. The track had originally been titled "Rückstoß Gondoliere", but was mis-pronounced by the television announcer as "Truckstop Gondolero" and has subsequently been known as the latter. Shortly afterwards Rother and Dinger seceded from Kraftwerk to form their own group: Neu!. Ralf Hütter returned to Kraftwerk at the request of Schneider, who was now without a guitarist or drummer. Kraftwerk would continue, recording Kraftwerk 2 at around the same time as Neu!'s debut album. The lack of a drummer would force them to pioneer the use of drum machines and electric percussion, and, in 1974, they made their chart debut with Autobahn.

In June 1971 Dinger's girlfriend moved with her family (her father, a banker, was unhappy about her being with Klaus) to Norway. Here Dinger visited her in the summer of 1971. During this holiday, Dinger recorded the "watery" sounds featuring on several of his subsequent songs (Im Glück, Lieber Honig, Gedenkminute, Lieber Honig 1981) whilst on a rowing boat with Anita. The pair would continue to see each other irregularly, and often with long intervals between meetings, through 1971, 1972 and 1973.

== 1971–1973: Neu! ==
Having broken off from Kraftwerk, Rother and Dinger quickly began the recording sessions for what would become Neu!. The band was christened "Neu!" by Dinger (Rother had been against the name, preferring a more "organic" title) and a pop-art style logo was created, featuring italic capitals: NEU! Dinger later said of the logo:

...it was a protest against the consumer society but also against our "colleagues" on the Krautrock scene who had totally different taste/styling if any. I was very well informed about Warhol, Pop Art, Contemporary Art. I had always been very visual in my thinking. Also, during that time, I lived in a commune and in order to get the space that we lived in, I set up an advertising agency which existed mainly on paper. Most of the people that I lived with were trying to break into advertising so I was somehow surrounded by this Neu! all the time.

The pair recorded in Star Studios in Hamburg, with the up-and-coming Krautrock producer Konrad Plank, as Dinger had with Kraftwerk. Dinger describes Conny's abilities as a "mediator" between the often disagreeing factions within the band. The band were booked into the studio for four days in late 1971, according to Dinger, the first two days were unproductive, until Dinger brought his Japanese banjo to the sessions, a heavily treated version of which can be heard on "Negativland", the first of the album's six tracks to be recorded.

It was during these sessions that Dinger first played his famous "motorik" beat. Motorik is a repeated 4/4 drumbeat with only occasional interruptions, perhaps best showcased on "Hallogallo". Dinger claims never to have called the beat "motorik" himself, preferring either "lange gerade" ("long straight") or "endlose gerade" ("endless straight"). He later changed the beat's "name" to the "Apache beat" to coincide with his 1985 solo album Neondian.

Neu! sold well for an underground album at the time, according to Dinger approximately 30,000 copies were sold. In order to promote the release the record label, Brain Records, organised a tour. Ex-Pissoff frontman Eberhard Kranemann was brought in to play bass, the trio recording a "practice" jam in preparation. The recording of this would later be released as Neu! '72 Live in Dusseldorf. Only some of the tour dates allotted were ever fulfilled, Rother later saying that he felt Neu! were not a touring band and that he and Dinger were at loggerheads over performance style:

At some shows blood splashed, when Klaus hurt himself with a broken cymbal. The audience was very much impressed by this radical and ecstatic performance. I never felt the need for this kind of performance and always tried to come across with just the music. So I sat behind my few effect devices and pedals and focused on the developing music and not so much on the audience.

In summer 1972 Dinger and Rother went to Conny Plank's studios in Köln to record a single. Dinger later said that the record company had tried to dissuade them from making it as it was not commercially viable. Nevertheless, the single Super/Neuschnee was released. The A-Side, Super, showcased the proto-punk style that Dinger would later adopt for his band La Düsseldorf.

The following January, Neu! again entered the studio to record their second album: Neu! 2. Far more heavily produced than their debut, the first side was recorded relatively slowly in the first and second months of 1973, and was aimed more specifically at foreign markets—the opening track "Fũr Immer" was subtitled "Forever", an English translation. Brain's parent label Metronome Records licensed the Neu! albums and single to United Artists for release in Britain around this time, the first with an alternative cover featuring sleeve notes by Hawkwind's Dave Brock, hoping to mirror the success of other German bands, such as Faust and Tangerine Dream, but unfortunately sales failed to match their German counterparts.

The second side of Neu! 2 has become notorious in the music press since its release. It features various tape manipulated versions of the two tracks from the Super/Neuschnee single released the previous summer. There have been several conflicting explanations as to why this was done, the most quoted being Dinger's assertion that: "When the money ran out, I got the idea of taking the single, play around with it and put the results on side 2 of the album."

However, this has recently been contested by Rother, who claims that the second side was made to aggravate their record label, who they felt had insufficiently promoted the original release of the Super/Neuschnee single, and not as a result of financial problems. Either way, the second side of the album was poorly received by fans who thought, according to Rother, that "we were making fun of them." This issue contributed to the widening gap between Dinger and Rother, both creatively and personally. Dinger later said of the issue:

[The second side of Neu! 2] was absolutely my idea. I came from that world, Pop Art thinking. Michael did not like the idea. These days he claims that everything in NEU! was 50/50. Financially: yes. Creatively: no. He was always very conventional.

== 1973–1975: Neu! and La Düsseldorf ==
Following the release of Neu! 2, Brain still expected the group to tour in support of the album, but the failure of the previous year's tour prompted Dinger and Rother to seek a new backing band and tour venues. To this end, Dinger travelled to London with his brother Thomas to try and organise a Neu! tour there. Although the visit was planned to last only six weeks or so, the Dinger brothers failed to return, staying for substantially longer. Despite this they achieved, in Dinger's words, "nothing," having met both John Peel and Karen Townshend (wife of Pete) and presented them with copies of Neu!'s debut, but - in spite of receiving an enthusiastic response from Peel, who played several tracks from the album on his BBC Radio 1 show - failed to drum up any commercial interest in the band.

Meanwhile, in Germany, Michael Rother had travelled to the famous Forst Commune, in an attempt to recruit Dieter Moebius and Hans-Joachim Roedelius of Cluster to play in an extended Neu! line-up. Rother, who unlike Dinger was interested in the Krautrock scene contemporary with Neu!, had been impressed by the track "Im Süden" from Cluster's second album Cluster II. After an initial jam between Moebius, Roedelius and Rother at Forst (captured in the track "Ohrwurm" on Harmonia's debut) Rother decided to stay at Forst and prepare a new album with Moebius and Roedelius as Harmonia, essentially abandoning his work with Dinger. Rother keeps a studio at Forst to this day.

Whilst Rother was at Forst, the Dinger brothers returned from London. Whilst in London, Dinger too had come up with a solution to Neu!'s problems, hoping to expand Neu!'s line-up to contain his brother and studio engineer Hans Lampe. Lampe had worked as Conny Plank's assistant throughout much of 1972, and was keenly interested in Neu!, having engineered Neu! 2 with Plank. Dinger began taking guitar lessons, in the hope that he would be able to take up the role of frontman in a new Neu!, with Rother on lead guitar and Thomas Dinger and Lampe both on drums: "During the recording of NEU! 2 I realized that I had done everything that I could do with drumming [...] I wanted to be more concreted and to reach more people."

In anticipation of this new line-up, the Dinger brothers and Lampe played several small concerts under the name La Düsseldorf whilst Rother remained at Forst.

Rother's continued absence was the cause of many problems, as Dinger was at this point far from proficient at guitar. That summer the trio travelled to Forst to meet Rother. Finding him entrenched in the recording of Musik von Harmonia and the Cluster album Zuckerzeit, Dinger attempted to convince his ex-bandmate of a Harmonia-La Düsseldorf supergroup which would include himself, Rother, Moebius, Roedelius, Lampe and Thomas Dinger, but this suggestion was rebuked by Rother, who no longer wished to have any involvement with Neu!.

Dinger returned to Düsseldorf disheartened, and immediately began to work on projects of his own. With the help of his friends from the Düsseldorf commune, Dinger set up the short-lived Dingerland Records. The label, which had its logo designed by Dinger's friend, the artist Achim Duchow (who would later design the La Düsseldorf logo) released only one album, "I'm Not Afraid to Say "Yes"" by the Lilac Angels. Dinger remembers:

I had started my own record company and had produced a band called Lilac Angels. I pressed too many records and around the same time I also organized two free concerts in Düsseldorf and received no help from the industry or the press. As a result, I went bankrupt, to the tune of 50,000 marks, an enormous sum for me.

Although releases by Eberhard Kranemann and Achim Duchow had been intended for the label, neither made it into print (although Kranemann's album "Fritz Müller Rock" was released by the "Röthe Hande" label in 1977). The Lilac Angels did not disband, but released a further two albums, meeting moderate popular acclaim in Germany. 1974 was also the year that Dinger's relationship with Anita finally ended. He has since maintained that she was "the love of my life" and continued to write songs addressed to her well into the 1990s.

Shortly after the collapse of Dingerland, Brain Records began enquiring after the third album Neu! were contracted to produce. In 1971 Dinger and Rother had agreed to a four-year contract with Brain, which specified that three albums be made, and the label, which was itself in financial difficulty, demanded that a final album be made. By late 1974 Harmonia had begun to factionalise, Rother preferring a more guitar driven sound and extensive touring, whilst Moebius and Roedelius favoured the electronic sound that characterised Cluster, and resented Rother's attempts to transform Harmonia from an art-orientated to a pop-orientated ensemble. Consequently, Rother was well placed to return to Düsseldorf in late 1974, to perform with the three members of La Düsseldorf in concert as Neu!. A live version of Hero was recorded for television, and is widely available on the internet. The performance highlights the disparity and enmity between Dinger and Rother, with Dinger playing guitar at the front of the stage, theatrically singing his lyrics, and Rother sat behind the stage machines, quietly providing the track's lead guitar parts.

The recording of Neu! '75, the last of Neu!'s original studio albums, was begun in December 1974 at Conny's studio in Cologne. Like Neu! 2 the album has a definite binary nature, with the first side recorded by the original duo of Dinger and Rother, the second by the expanded four-part Neu!-La Düsseldorf supergroup. Dinger recognised this duality, admitting that "me and Michael drift[ed] apart," but Rother maintains that "it was the combination of our two strengths which made the magic." Either way, Dinger's apparent contribution to "Rother's" side of the album is limited to the drums on Isi and Seeland plus and vocals on Leb' Wohl, whilst Rother's contribution to the "La Düsseldorf" side is two guitar solos, on Hero and After Eight respectively. The soft-loud dynamic of the album's two sides have directly influenced many artists since, most notably David Bowie, who used the inverse of that format on his albums Low and "Heroes". Neu! '75 is considered Neu!'s best album by many.

Neu! '75 was also the first album for which Dinger wrote lyrics, and the subject matter was largely his now ended romance with Anita. Hero displays her loss ("Honey went to Norway"), and Dinger's anger at the music industry following the failure of Dingerland and the insufficient promotion by their record label ("Fuck the company, Your only friend is money"), whilst After Eight's lyrics feature the repeated refrain "Help me through the night". The latter is a reference to a recurring dream Dinger had of Anita, which plagued him for many years, and manifest themselves in lyrics such as "Come to me" (Lieber Honig 1981, 1981), "I want to touch you tonight" (Touch Me Tonight, 1986) and "Jag Älskar Dig" (Ich Liebe Dich, 1983).

Immediately following the release of Neu! '75, Neu! disbanded. Rother returned to Forst to complete a second album with Harmonia, whilst Dinger continued to tour with La Düsseldorf.

== 1975–1983: La Düsseldorf ==
Having completed his contract with Brain, Dinger left the label and signed to Teldec, a major label in Germany at the time, which specialised in pop music, unlike the more eclectic Brain. Dinger would remain signed to Teldec until he was dramatically dropped in 1984.

Dinger spent the summer of 1975 improving his guitar playing and writing lyrics, intending to turn La Düsseldorf into a viable pop group. It was also in this period that Dinger began to use his signature Open-E tuning for the guitar, which would remain his tuning of favour for the rest of his career. Dinger's guitar playing, at first criticised as amateurish, developed in time to be as simplistic yet rhythmically advanced as his drumming, and Dinger never played a full drum kit on record again until 1998's Year of the Tiger.

In September 1975, La Düsseldorf entered the studio to begin recording their debut album, retaining Conny Plank as producer and featuring the same line-up as played on Neu! '75 (minus Rother) with the addition of ex-Thirsty Moon bass player Harald Konietzko for the album's B-side. The album took the longest to record of any Dinger album yet made, sessions lasting until December 1975, and this is reflected in a higher quality of production, with multiple overdubs of guitar, organ and synthesiser created.

The music featured on La Düsseldorf is far more commercial than the La Düsseldorf tracks that had appeared on Neu! '75. Whilst the latter can be described as proto-punk, tracks like Düsseldorf and Silver Cloud lean further towards the sound of post-punk and is greatly influenced by Kraftwerk's album Autobahn which had achieved commercial success worldwide in 1974. Like Autobahn, the album was very successful in Germany, but was unfortunately not marketed abroad. La Düsseldorf's lead single — Silver Cloud — reached number 2 on the German hit parade on its release in early 1976, an achievement all the more striking given that the song was instrumental.

The album itself was released by Teldec in the summer of 1976, with all tracks written by Dinger. The personnel listing also featured a "Nicolas van Rhein" on keyboards, a pseudonym that Dinger would continue to use (sometimes insincerely) for the rest of his career, although more commonly spelled using the Dutch version "Niklaus van Rheijn" after Dinger's relocation to The Netherlands.

La Düsseldorf's success turned the band members into celebrities with the band "logo sprayed all over Düsseldorf streets" by fans, and Thomas becoming "one of the most glamorous people in Düsseldorf." All three band members began wearing White Overalls, a uniform Dinger had kept since before the advent of Neu!:

We were very conscious of [fashion]. The look with the white overalls was an idea that I came up with for NEU! and it can be seen in the only official NEU! publicity shot[s]. The others were a bit hesitant at first but we ended up using it as a uniform in La Düsseldorf. It clicked, it functioned. I realized at a very early stage in my life that I would never be able to afford expensive clothes so I had to create my own style. Besides, I never liked the idea that you could just buy "good taste". I had the same attitude to clothes as to [record] sleeves. They had to be based on cheap things, everyday things.

La Düsseldorf also maintained a feeling of unity and coherence as a band which had been visibly lacking in Neu!: "We didn't live together but we were always together and we felt the same."

The commercial success of their debut album made the band wealthy enough for to be able to create their own studio in Düsseldorf, and from 1976 the band dispensed with Conny Plank, preferring to produce their own material, Hans being a trained studio engineer. Their new facilities were soon put to use, as the band began to record a follow-up to La Düsseldorf. The album Viva took shape over a period of a year and a half, studio time no longer being an issue for the band. The album is markedly more commercial than its predecessor, and was specifically aimed at foreign markets—especially Britain and America—, most of the lyrics being in English (although French, Italian and German lyrics also featured). However, the international success Teldec anticipated never materialised, as the label's foreign distributor went bust just before Viva's release. As a result, the promised release of both Viva and La Düsseldorf abroad only occurred in the UK (where the debut was released by Decca and its follow-up by Radar, and some foreign fans who had pre-ordered the albums were left un-refunded.

Viva sold well within Germany however (over 150,000 copies), and is considered by some to be La Düsseldorf's finest album. It was preceded by the release of the single Rheinita, which although reached only number 3 on the hit parade, far outsold its predecessor Silver Cloud. The single was voted "track of the year" by several German radio stations, and stayed at number one on some unofficial charts for over a year. Like Silver Cloud, it was an instrumental, dominated by rhapsodic melodies played in diatonic thirds, which would become a familiar mode in Dinger's music from then on. The track's title alluded to Dinger's two great loves: the Rhein and his departed Lieber Honig Anita.

The great commercial success of both the album and the single prompted La Düsseldorf to perform in concert, something which they had avoided up until then due to their music's heavily overdubbed nature and the fact that Klaus played all instruments except drums, making concerts a practical impossibility. Nevertheless, they made several TV appearances in which they mimed their performances. A recording of their "performance" of Rheinita at a free concert in Düsseldorf in 1979 is widely available on the internet.

Viva also saw the first release of a song which would become a concert (and studio) staple for Dinger over the years: Cha Cha 2000. The song—twenty minutes in length on Viva, taking up the entire of side two—explores in its lyrics Dinger's vision of paradise "where the air is clean / and the grass is green," although Dinger paradoxically implores his listeners to "stop smoking and doping;" activities in which all three members of the band had engaged copiously since the early 70s. The central section of the song features a lengthy piano solo by Andreas Schell; a new recruit to the band. Despite appearing on Viva far less than Harald Konietzko, Schell seems to have been adopted as the band's fourth member, appearing in publicity shoots and many of the polaroids that make up the Viva gatefold photo-montage.

In 1979 the "maxi-single" version of Rheinita was released, attracting the attention of EMI, who made the group a 1 million mark offer, which they subsequently refused. The increasing wealth the band was generating began to cause tensions amongst the band members:

The problem was "too much, too fast". Big money was coming in and we had no one to advise us on how to handle it. How to handle big money had never been a problem in our family.

The recording sessions for a follow-up to Viva: Individuellos, were soured by arguments, and the band's popularity decreased in the wake of the Neue Deutsche Welle phenomenon, with bands such as Einstürzende Neubauten creating music that was drastically at odds with that of La Düsseldorf (although other bands such as Rheingold actively imitated La Düsseldorf's style). These issues were compacted by the suicide of Andreas Schell (who was due to feature more prominently on the album) in 1980, midway through the sessions. Schell's loss was heavily mourned, and the sleeve of Individuellos features a tribute to him. The album was never completed, partly as a consequence of Schell's death, and is far less professionally made as a result. As on Neu! 2, Dinger opted to recycle various versions of the same song on the album, with the melody of "Menschen" featuring on "Menschen 1", "Menschen 2", "Lieber Honig 1981", and played backwards on both "Sentimental" and "Flashback". The latter two tracks are abstract tape collages, and given that much of the album's second side was given over to overtly humorous and playful faux-oompah pieces, the content of Individuellos is often seen as slim. Despite this, the album has recently become critically popular, with Stephen Thrower commenting that: "[Individuellos] is equally as good as Viva, and it actually has a streak of experimentalism that takes it further out than the other two [La Düsseldorf albums]."

Released in December 1980, the album sold poorly, and the single "Dampfriemen" failed to chart. The album was the first La Düsseldorf album to feature songs credited to others than Klaus Dinger, with the jam "Das Yvönchen" credited equally to the Dinger brothers, Lampe and Schell and Thomas Dinger receiving a co-credit with Klaus on "Dampfriemen" and a solo credit on "Tintarella Di...". The degree to which the other band members contributed to La Düsseldorf's output during the band's existence led Klaus to court several times in the 1980s.

The production of Individuellos was immediately followed by that of a Thomas Dinger solo album: Für Mich. Für Mich featured both Klaus and Hans Lampe as co-producers, and Hans on drums. Stylistically similar to the Thomas Dinger-written tracks on Individuellos, it exhibits the electronic sound the band would adopt more and more in their final years.

In 1983 the Dinger brothers moved their studio from Düsseldorf to Zeeland, on the Dutch coast. Their parents, Heinz and Renate, kept a holiday home just outside the village of Kamperland, and the adjoining barn was converted into a studio. Dinger would keep a studio there for the rest of his life, first christening it Langeweg Studios after the road on which it sat, and then Zeeland Studios, which it was most commonly known as from the 1990s onwards.

With the studio being built and preparations being made for a fourth La Düsseldorf album (which had been announced the previous year, in accordance with a renewal of the band's contract with Teldec) Hans Lampe began to take part less and less in sessions. Like the recording of Individuellos, the period was marked by arguments between band members, and by the time of the band's next record, Hans Lampe had left the group.

However, La Düsseldorf had not split up, and the Dinger brothers continued as a duo for several months, preparing the fourth album. To this end a single was released in 1983: "Ich Liebe Dich". More electronic in feel than the band's previous singles, but along the same lines as Rheinita. It was written by Klaus alone, but the B-side, "Koksknödel", was composed instrumentally by Thomas (and is similar in sound to "Für Mich") with lyrics written by Klaus. This was to be the brothers' final collaboration until 1998's Goldregen, as Thomas finally left the group in late 1983. The songs written for the proposed fourth album, including a reworked version of "Ich Liebe Dich", were to be included on Klaus's debut solo album Néondian. The acrimony of the split was reflected in a series of legal battles fought between band members until a settlement was finally reached in 1997.

== 1984–1987: Néondian, Neu! 4 and Blue ==
In the wake of Thomas' departure, Dinger fled to Zeeland, where he began recording what he envisaged to be a fourth La Düsseldorf album alone. All of the album's songs had already been written, and one, "Ich Liebe Dich", was already released as a single under the La Düsseldorf name. The basic tracks for the upcoming album were recorded by Dinger in early 1984, to be mixed and overdubbed by other musicians later on.

The album's subject matter is largely darker than Dinger's previous three albums, mirroring changes in German culture. Like contemporary bands such as D.A.F., Dinger wrote of America's political and cultural hegemony over the western world, often comparing the policies of Ronald Reagan to those of the Nazis ("Heil Ronald!" is a lyric from the song Pipi AA). Dinger also criticises the commercialism and inhumanity of society ("Businessmen verkauft die Welt / Tod und Leben gegen Geld" — Businessmen sell the earth / Death and life versus money). By far the most famous (and inflammatory) song to come from Néondian is America, an anti-US pop song, which Warner refused to print the lyrics of in the album's official CD re-release. Perhaps the most striking lyrics are "Don't say you fight for freedom / You stole all your land from Indians / In a holocaust / And you still do!" This reflects Dinger's outrage at the Reagan administration's treatment of Native American Indians, and issue which he was passionate about, and for which the album is named (Néon = Neon (urban), -dian = Indian (Dinger felt himself persecuted by popular culture)). The album cover art features visual representations of many of these themes, Dinger having a white feather stuck to his head with a sticking plaster, and the lid of a Coca-Cola bottle stuck to the photo.

The absence of Dinger's usual studio engineer, Hans Lampe, meant that a substitute had to be found, and as a result Conny Plank was welcomed back to produce the album (having last worked with Dinger in 1976). The studio musicians brought in to overdub Dinger's basic recordings included ex-Kowalski guitarist Rudiger Elze (known as "Spinello"), Belfegore bassist Raoul Walton and drummer Charly Therstappen, who would all collaborate with Dinger for the next four years (and longer in the case of Elze). Jaki Liebezeit of Can also featured briefly, being credited with "percussion" on Mon Amour. The album is arguably the most electronic Dinger would ever make, a fact that has earned it a bad reputation. Dinger later said (somewhat paradoxically) that: "...I find mechanical music unacceptable, there must be something human and tangible about recorded music."

By 1985 the Néondian material was ready for release, but the process was stimied by the intervention of Thomas Dinger and Hans Lampe. Dinger's ex-bandmates objected to the new album being released under the La Düsseldorf name, and took him to court over the matter. Teldec was eager to make the release quickly, and so put the LP out before the court case was heard, under the name "Klaus Dinger + Rheinita Bella Düsseldorf", hoping to attract La Düsseldorf fans by the obvious allusion to Rheinita. The single Mon Amour/America was also released, and jointly they were the first releases by Dinger to appear on CD. Like Ich Liebe Dich and Dampfriemen, the new single failed to chart, but more worryingly for Teldec, the album sales were the lowest of any of Dinger's album's to date, undoubtedly harmed by the name change. In reaction to this, the album was withdrawn from production after only a week, much to Dinger's outrage. As few music retailers had bought up stocks of the record, first-printing copies of the album are extremely rare. The music videos which had been recorded for both America and Ich Liebe Dich were never released, although Dinger incorporated stills into the CD booklets of both Blue (released 1999) and the re-release of Néondian — Mon Amour (released 2006).

With the La Düsseldorf name blocked, Dinger turned back to his first successful project: Neu!. Since the group disbanded in 1975, Michael Rother had recorded a further two albums with Harmonia and five solo albums. The recording of the last of these, Lust, had coicided with the recording of Néondian. Conny Plank had worked with Rother on his first three studio albums, as had Jaki Liebezeit, and both had also appeared on Néondian. As a result, Dinger was well connected with Michael Rother in 1985, and an arrangements were made for a Neu! reunion album, and supporting tour. Dinger and Rother were unable to secure the help of Conny Plank—vital as a "mediator"—who was engaged with Dieter Moebius in a world tour as Moebius & Plank. Recording thus began in Dinger's Düsseldorf studios (named "Im Gründ" here and elsewhere) in late 1985.

Sessions were troubled, not least by the difficult relationship Dinger and Rother maintained. Dinger also disliked Rother's new style of music, exhibited on Lust, which forwent guitar for synthesizers: "One of the reasons the spark did not jump during the recordings with Michael Rother in '85 [was that] he had to search so long to find a guitar, so in the end he stuck to his Fairlight [synthesizer]."

After several weeks of recording, sessions began to break down, and by early 1986 the project had been abandoned. The album was partly finished, with the songs "Good Life", "Crazy", "Dänzing" and "La Bomba (Stop Apartheid World Wide!)" being complete. However, this amounted only to half of a potential album, with the remainder of material being unfinished and fragmentary, lacking vocals, instrumental overdubs, or both. Dinger and Rother sealed the master reels with wax, intending to resume sessions at a later date. Dinger moved back to Zeeland with Mâri and her children, decorating and furnishing the old farmhouse as a permanent family home.

Here, Dinger worked on a number of tracks he had roughly recorded alone after the release of Neondian. These tracks would eventually come to constitute the album Blue, which was released in 1999 on Captain Trip Records.

== La! Neu? ==
La! Neu? is a later project that Dinger headed. Through the mid-1990s, the group released albums on Captain Trip Records, the label that also issued the "semi-official" recordings Neu! 4 and Neu! '72 Live! (both of which were released without Rother's consent).

== Death ==
Klaus Dinger died unexpectedly of heart failure three days before his 62nd birthday. The funeral took place in the presence of his closest family members.

== Discography ==
with Kraftwerk

- Kraftwerk (1970; on track 4 only)

with Neu!

- Neu! (1972)
- Neu! '72 Live in Düsseldorf (1972, released 1996)
- 1972 Live (1972, released 2009, private CD-R release)
- Neu! 2 (1973)
- Neu! '75 (1975)
- Neu! 4 (1986, released 1995)

with La Düsseldorf

- La Düsseldorf (1976)
- Viva (1978)
- Individuellos (1980)

solo albums

- Néondian (1985, released as K.D. + Rheinita Bella Düsseldorf, re-released in 2006 as Mon Amour by la-düsseldorf.de)
- Blue (1987, released 1999 under la! Neu? name)

with Die Engel des Herrn

- Die Engel des Herrn (1989, released in 1992)
- Live As Hippie-Punks (1993, released 1995)

with la! Neu?

- Düsseldorf (1996)
- Zeeland (1997)
- Live in Tokyo 1996 Vol. 2 (1996, released 1999)
- Cha Cha 2000 - Live in Tokyo (1996, released 1998)
- Goldregen (1998)
- Year of the Tiger (1998)
- Live at Kunsthalle Düsseldorf (1998, released 2001)

with la-duesseldorf.de

- Mon Amour (2006, re-release of Neondian with bonus tracks)

as Klaus Dinger + Japandorf

- Japandorf (2008, released 2013)
- Pre-Japandorf: Live 2000! (2018, a live album)

produced by Dinger

- I'm not afraid to say yes! - Lilac Angels (1973)
- Rembrandt: God Strikes Back - Rembrandt Lensink (1997, Released as la! Neu?)
- Bluepoint Underground in New York City - Bluepoint Underground (1998)
- Kraut? - Die With Dignity (1998)
- Magina - Miki Yui (2010)
