= La Düsseldorf =

German band

- Origin: Düsseldorf, West Germany
- Genres: Krautrock; proto-punk; art rock; electronic
- Years active: 1975–1983; 2001–2008
- Labels: Teldec; Decca Records; Captain Trip Records; Warner Music; Nova Records; Strand Records; Radar Records; Albion Records
- Members: Klaus Dinger; Thomas Dinger; Hans Lampe; Harald Konietzko; Andreas Schell; Nikolaus Van Rhein

La Düsseldorf was a German krautrock band formed in 1975 by Klaus Dinger (formerly of Neu!), his brother Thomas Dinger, and Hans Lampe.

La Düsseldorf released a string of successful albums (with sales totaling over a million) during the late 1970s and early 1980s, and were considered highly influential by Brian Eno and David Bowie, with Bowie going so far as calling La Düsseldorf "the soundtrack of the eighties". OMD also cited the band as an influence. The release of their third record Individuellos was followed by a "years-long legal dispute" with Warner Records and disagreements between the Dinger brothers.

== Overview ==
=== Core members ===
- Klaus Dinger – vocals, guitar, keyboards
- Thomas Dinger – vocals, drums, percussion
- Hans Lampe – drums, percussion, keyboards, electronics

=== Other members ===
- Harald Konietzko (1978) – bass
- Andreas Schell (1978) – piano
- Nikolaus Van Rhein (1976–1981) – keyboards (this is a pseudonym of Klaus Dinger)

== Discography ==
=== Albums ===
- 1976 – La Düsseldorf (Teldec Records)
- 1978 – Viva (Teldec)
- 1980 – Individuellos (Teldec)

The following albums were released by Klaus Dinger without the participation of any other band members. Due to legal disputes, the albums could not be released under the La Düsseldorf name, but were subtitled "La Düsseldorf 4" and "La Düsseldorf 5" respectively.

- 1985 – Néondian (Teldec, released under the name "Klaus Dinger and Rheinita Bella Düsseldorf")
- 1999 – Blue (Captain Trip Records, recorded between 1985 and 1987, released under the name "La! Neu?")

In 2006 Klaus Dinger sought to revive La Düsseldorf properly, but was again blocked by legal problems. He instead chose to release under the name "La-duesseldorf.de" (also the name of his most recent website) or "Klaus Dinger + Japandorf". This project features only Klaus of the original band.

- 2006 – Mon Amour (Warner Records; a re-release of Néondian with bonus tracks that was only briefly in print)
- 2013 – Japandorf

=== Singles ===
- 1976 – "Silver Cloud/La Düsseldorf" (Teldec)
- 1978 – "Rheinita/Viva" (Teldec)
- 1980 – "Dampfriemen/Individuellos" (Teldec)
- 1983 – "Ich Liebe Dich (Teil 1)/Ich Liebe Dich (Teil 2)" (Teldec)

=== Maxi-singles ===
- 1978 – "Rheinita/Viva" (Teldec)
- 1980 – "Dampfriemen/Individuellos" (Teldec)
- 1983 – "Ich liebe Dich/Koksknödel" (Teldec)

=== Video ===
- 2004 – Rheinita 1979 (a live performance of Rheinita that can be viewed for free on Klaus Dinger's website)
- Romantic Warriors IV: Krautrock (2019)

The booklets of "Neondian" and "Blue" also hint at the existence of videos for "America" (Neondian) and "Ich Liebe Dich" (single) although neither have been released.

== See also ==
- Amon Düül II (aka Amon Duul II)
- Ash Ra Tempel
- Can (band)
- Cluster (band)
- The Cosmic Jokers
- Faust (band)
- Harmonia (band)
- Hawkwind
- Kraftwerk
- La! Neu?
- Neu!
- Popol Vuh (band)
