= Viva (La Düsseldorf album) =

Studio album by La Düsseldorf
- Released: 1978
- Recorded: June – September 1978
- Studio: La Düsseldorf Studio
- Length: 40:19
- Label: Radar
- Producer: Klaus Dinger

Klaus Dinger chronology
La Düsseldorf (1976)	Viva (1978)	Individuellos (1980)

Singles from Viva
- 1. "Rheinita" Released: 1979

Professional ratings
Review scores
Source	Rating
Allmusic	4.5/5 stars
Smash Hits	7/10

Viva is the second album by La Düsseldorf, led by Klaus Dinger. It has both "Rheinita", which was their most successful single, and "Cha Cha 2000", which has become their most famous song. Overall, it was their most successful release.

Different mixes/edits of "Rheinita" and "Viva" were released as singles; the single version of "Viva" is slightly longer and has a fadeout, the album version segues into "White Overalls". "Vögel" ("Birds") is a minute and a half of bird noises. All songs are written by Klaus Dinger.

== Reception ==
At the time of release, Smash Hits opined "If you're looking for something different or something new to pose with and say ever-so-casually 'oh, haven't you heard of them?' to your friends, then try this. It's modern German rock with lots of synthesisers but it's also bright and melodic and completely house-trained."

== Track listing ==
All tracks composed by Klaus Dinger.

1. "Viva" – 2:36
2. "White Overalls" – 2:07
3. "Rheinita" – 7:41
4. "Vögel" – 1:27
5. "Geld" – 6:35
6. "Cha Cha 2000" – 19:53

== Personnel ==
La Düsseldorf

- Thomas Dinger – vocals, percussion
- Hans Lampe – drums, percussion
- Andreas Schell – piano on '6'
- Klaus Dinger – vocals, percussion, guitars
- Nikolas van Rhijn (a pseudonym for Klaus Dinger) – keyboards, synthesizers
- Harald Konietzko – bass on '5' and '6'
