= Herbert Grönemeyer discography =

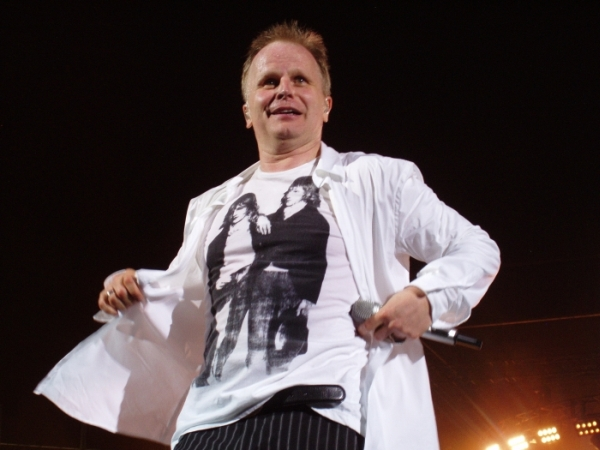
- Grönemeyer performing in 2007
- Studio albums: 17
- Live albums: 5
- Compilation albums: 2
- Singles: 40
- Video albums: 6

German singer Herbert Grönemeyer has released 17 studio albums, five live albums, as well as two compilations, six video albums and 40 singles. According to Bundesverband Musikindustrie, Grönemeyer is the best-selling artist in Germany, with over 18 million records sold. IFPI Austria lists sales of more than one million records, while the singer sold more than 650,000 records in Switzerland, according to IFPI Switzerland.

== Albums ==
=== Studio albums ===
==== German language studio albums ====
List of studio albums, with chart positions and certifications
Title	Album details	Peak chart positions				Certifications
Title	Album details	GER	AUT	NLD	SWI	Certifications
Grönemeyer	Released: 1979; Label: Intercord Records; Formats: CD, LP	—	—	—	—	
Zwo	Released: 1980; Label: Intercord Records; Formats: CD, LP	—	—	—	—	
Total Egal	Released: 1982; Label: Intercord Records; Formats: CD, LP	—	—	—	—	
Gemischte Gefühle	Released: 1983; Label: Intercord; Formats: CD, LP	43	—	—	—	BVMI: Gold
4630 Bochum	Released: 14 August 1984; Label: Electrola Records; Formats: CD, LP	1	7	—	12	BVMI: 11× Gold; IFPI AUT: 2× Platinum; IFPI SWI: Platinum
Sprünge	Released: 30 April 1986; Label: EMI Records; Formats: CD, LP	1	1	—	1	BVMI: 2× Platinum; IFPI AUT: Gold; IFPI SWI: Gold
Ö	Released: 30 March 1988; Label: Electrola Records; Formats: CD, LP	1	1	—	1	BVMI: 7× Gold; IFPI AUT: 2× Platinum; IFPI SWI: Platinum
Luxus	Released: 17 September 1990; Label: Electrola Records; Formats: CD, LP	1	1	—	6	BVMI: 2× Platinum; IFPI AUT: Platinum; IFPI SWI: Gold
Chaos	Released: 24 May 1993; Label: Electrola Records; Formats: CD, LP	1	2	—	8	BVMI: 3× Gold; IFPI AUT: Gold; IFPI SWI: Gold
Bleibt alles anders	Released: 17 April 1998; Label: Grönland Records; Formats: CD, LP	1	1	—	3	BVMI: 3× Gold; IFPI AUT: Platinum; IFPI SWI: Platinum
Mensch	Released: 30 August 2002; Label: Grönland Records; Formats: CD, LP, SACD	1	1	38	1	BVMI: 21× Gold; IFPI AUT: 8× Platinum; IFPI SWI: 5× Platinum
12	Released: 2 March 2007; Label: Grönland Records; Formats: CD, LP	1	1	64	1	BVMI: 4× Platinum; IFPI AUT: 3× Platinum; IFPI SWI: 3× Platinum
Schiffsverkehr	Released: 18 March 2011; Label: Grönland Records; Formats: CD, LP	1	1	34	1	BVMI: 2× Platinum; IFPI AUT: Platinum; IFPI SWI: Gold
Dauernd jetzt	Released: 21 November 2014; Label: Grönland Records; Formats: CD, LP, digital download	1	1	65	1	BVMI: 5× Gold; IFPI AUT: 2× Platinum; IFPI SWI: Platinum
Tumult	Released: 9 November 2018; Label: Grönland Records; Formats: CD, LP, digital download	1	1	122	2	BVMI: Platinum; IFPI AUT: Platinum; IFPI SWI: Gold
Das ist los	Released: 24 March 2023; Label: Grönland Records; Formats: CD, LP, digital download	2	1	—	3	
Von allem anders – Unplugged N°2	Released: 17 October 2025; Label: Grönland Records; Formats: CD, LP, digital download	3	—	—	6	
"—" denotes a recording that did not chart or was not released in that territory.

==== English-language studio albums ====
List of studio albums, with chart positions
Title	Album details	Peak chart positions				
Title	Album details	GER	AUT	NLD	SWI	CAN
? What's All This	Released: 1988; Label: Capitol Records; Formats: CD, LP	—	—	—	—	
Luxus	Released: 1992; Label: EMI Records; Formats: CD, LP	—	—	—	—	
Chaos	Released: 1995; Label: Electrola Records; Formats: CD, LP	—	—	—	—	
I Walk	Released: 2012; Label: Grönland Records; Formats: CD, LP, digital download	18	19	—	48	
"—" denotes a recording that did not chart or was not released in that territory.

==== Soundtrack albums ====
- 2010: The American
- 2014: A Most Wanted Man

=== Live albums ===
Year	Title	Chart positions			Notes
Year	Title	GER	AUT	SWI	Notes
1995	Grönemeyer live	3 (46 weeks)	3 (64 weeks)	4 (19 weeks)	Release: 30 October 1995; Sales: + 815,000
1995	Unplugged Herbert	6 (31 weeks)	8 (22 weeks)	9 (17 weeks)	Release: 30 October 1995; Sales: + 1,000,000
2000	Stand der Dinge	—	—	—	Release: 13 November 2000; Sales: + 150,000
2003	Mensch live	1 (20 weeks)	*	34 (7 weeks)	Release: 7 November 2003; Sales: + 320.000 * see DVD
2012	Live at Montreux 2012	30 (2 weeks)	*	*	Release: 16 November 2012 * see DVD
2016	Live in Bochum	7 (... weeks)	40 (... weeks)	48 (... weeks)	Release: 25 November 2016

=== Remix albums ===
Year	Title	Chart positions			Notes
Year	Title	GER	AUT	SWI	Notes
1994	Cosmic Chaos	16 (16 weeks)	—	—	Release: 20 October 1994
2003	Mensch Remixe	*	*	*	Release: 29 September 2003 * see Mensch

=== Compilation albums ===
Year	Title	Chart positions			Notes
Year	Title	GER	AUT	SWI	Notes
1992	So gut (1979–1983)	—	—	—	Release: 1 March 1992
2008	Was muss muss (Best of)	1 (45 weeks)	1 (26 weeks)	8 (... weeks)	Release: 21 November 2008; Sales: + 700,000

=== Box sets ===
Year	Title	Chart positions			Notes
Year	Title	GER	AT	CH	Notes
1990	Die ersten Vier	—	—	—	Released: 1 September 1990
2016	Alles	15 (... weeks)	—	—	Released: 25 November 2016

== Singles ==
=== Singles ===
Title	Year	Peak chart positions			Certifications	Album
Title	Year	GER	AUT	SWI	Certifications	Album
"Pompeji"	1979	–	–	–		Grönemeyer
"Anna"	1982	–	–	–		Total Egal
"Currywurst"	1982	–	–	–		Total Egal
"Kaufen"	1983	–	–	–		Gemischte Gefühle
"Musik, nur wenn sie laut ist"	1983	–	–	–		Gemischte Gefühle
"Etwas warmes"	1983	–	–	–		Gemischte Gefühle
"Männer"	1984	7	–	27		4630 Bochum
"Alkohol"	1984	33	–	–		4630 Bochum
"Flugzeuge im Bauch"	1985	44	–	–		4630 Bochum
"Kinder an die Macht"	1986	33	10	–		Sprünge
"Tanzen"	1986	–	—	—		Sprünge
"Nur noch so"	1986	–	–	–		Sprünge
"Unterwegs"	1987	–	–	–		Sprünge
"Ich hab' dich lieb"	1988	–	–	–		Zwo
"Was soll das?"	1988	3	15	–		Ö
"Vollmond"	1988	21	–	–		Ö
"Halt mich"	1988	33	–	–		Ö
"Mit Gott"	1988	–	–	–		Ö
"? What's All This"	1988	–	–	–		? What's All This
"Full Moon"	1988	–	–	–		? What's All This
"Komet"	1989	59	–	–		Ö
"Deine Liebe klebt"	1990	8	23	–		Luxus
"Luxus"	1990	35	–	–		Luxus
"Marie"	1991	53	–	–		Luxus
"Haarscharf"	1991	64	–	–		Luxus
"Video"	1991	–	–	–		Luxus
"Onur"	1991	–	–	–		So gut (1979–1983)
"Hard Cash"	1992	–	–	–		Luxus (English)
"Chaos"	1993	20	–	–		Chaos
"Fisch im Netz"	1993	51	–	–		Chaos
"Land unter"	1993	52	–	–		Chaos
"Die Härte"	1994	92	–	–		Chaos
"Morgenrot"	1994	–	–	–		Chaos / Cosmic Chaos
"Halt mich"	1995	71	–	–		Unplugged Herbert / Grönemeyer Live
"Ich hab dich lieb (Live)"	1996	–	12	–		Grönemeyer Live
"Land unter (Live)"	1996	–	–	–		Grönemeyer Live
"Bochum (Live)"	1996	–	–	–		Grönemeyer Live
Ich will mehr (Unplugged)	1996	–	–	–		Unplugged Herbert
"Bleibt alles anders"	1998	25	16	36		Bleibt alles anders
"Letze Version"	1998	79	–	–		Bleibt alles anders
"Fanatisch"	1998	–	–	–		Bleibt alles anders
"Nach mir"	1998	–	–	–		Bleibt alles anders
"Stand der Dinge"	1998	–	–	–		Bleibt alles anders
"Ich dreh mich um dich"	1999	79	–	–		Bleibt alles anders
"Da Da Da"	2000	54	–	–		Pop 2000
"Lächeln"	2000	–	–	–		Sprünge
"Flugzeuge im Bauch (Live)"	2000	42	–	–		Stand der Dinge
"Mensch"	2002	1	1	2	GER: Platinum; SWI: Gold	Mensch
"Der Weg"	2002	12	14	35		Mensch
"Demo (Letzter Tag)"	2003	36	53	–		Mensch
"Zum Meer"	2003	81	–	–		Mensch
"Unbewohnt"	2003	–	–	–		Mensch
"Celebrate the Day / Zeit, dass sich was dreht"	2006	1	2	17	GER: Platinum	Voices from the FIFA World Cup
"Lied 1 – Stück vom Himmel"	2007	1	5	3		12
"Lied 3 – Du bist die"	2007	42	67	99		12
"Lied 2 – Kopf hoch, tanzen"	2007	66	–	–		12
"Lied 6 – Leb in meiner Welt"	2007	71	–	–		12
"Glück"	2008	4	3	26		Was muss muss (Best of)
"Komm zur Ruhr"	2010	7	–	–		non-album-single
"Schiffsverkehr"	2011	10	33	45		Schiffsverkehr
"Fernweh"	2011	93	65	–		Schiffsverkehr
"Zu dir"	2011	76	72	–		Schiffsverkehr
"Will I Ever Learn"	2012	–	–	–		I Walk
"Morgen"	2014	5	8	12		Dauernd jetzt
"Fang mich an"	2015	41	–	–		Dauernd jetzt
"Bochum 2015 (Die 5. Strophe)"	2015	–	–	–		non-album-single
"Sekundenglück"	2018	36	–	100		Tumult
"Doppelherz / Iki Gönlüm"	2018	–	–	–		Tumult
"Warum"	2018	–	–	–		Tumult
"Deine Hand"	2022	36	–	100		Das ist los
"Urverlust"	2022	–	–	–		Das ist los
"—" denotes a recording that did not chart or was not released in that territory.

=== Collaboration singles ===
Year	Title	Chart positions			Notes
Year	Title	GER	AUT	SWI	Notes
1979	Don't Begin	—	—	—	(with Ocean Orchestra)
1985	Nackt im Wind	3 (10 weeks)	—	—	Release: 21 January 1985 (with Band für Afrika)
1993	Dance Chaos	—	—	—	(with Matiz / AC 16)
1994	Die Härte	—	—	—	(with Matiz / AC 16)
2002	Mensch	—	—	—	(with Spacemonkeyz)
2003	Taxi Europa	—	—	53 (14 weeks)	Release: 26 May 2003 (with Stephan Eicher and Gazzè)
2004	Everlasting	—	—	—	(with Cheb Mami and George Dalaras)
2007	Einfach sein Fornika	11 (27 weeks)	13 (29 weeks)	22 (15 weeks)	Release: 25 May 2007 (with Die Fantastischen Vier)
2012	Die Staubkornsammlung	—	—	—	(with Gang of Four)
2016	Jeder für jeden	27 (... weeks)	—	—	Release: 22 April 2016 (with Felix Jaehn)

=== Other collaborations ===
- 1985 "Nackt im Wind" (Single) by Band for Africa (with Nena, Udo Lindenberg, Peter Maffay, Rio Reiser, Wolfgang Niedecken and others)
- 1991 The Fall of the House of Usher as The Herbalist (album by Peter Hammill and Judge Smith)
- 1996 "Uebers Meer" (Album: Tribute to Rio Reiser)
- 2003 "Taxi Europa" (Album: Taxi Europa) by Stephan Eicher
- 2004 "Everlasting" (Album: Unity – Athens 2004) with Youssou N'Dour
- 2005 "Einmal nur in unserem Leben" (Album: Dreimal Zehn Jahre BAP) by BAP
- 2006 "Grauschleier" (Album: 26½) by Fehlfarben
- 2006 "Zeit, dass sich was dreht / Celebrate the day / Fetez cette journée" (Single) with Amadou and Marjam
- 2006 "Geld 2006 (Internet Warm-Up Version)" song released as a bonus track on rarities compilation "Mon Amour" by Klaus Dinger
- 2007 "Einfach sein" (Album: Fornika) by Die Fantastischen Vier
- 2008 "Will I Ever Learn" (Album: Was muss muss) with Antony Hegarty
- 2009 "Mes Emmerdes" (Album: Duos) with Charles Aznavour
- 2009 "Als es mir beschissen ging" (Album: Duos) with Charles Aznavour
- 2015 ″Staubkorn (The Dying Rays)″ (Album: What Happens Next) with Gang Of Four

== Videos ==
=== Video albums ===
List of video albums, with chart positions and certifications
Title	Album details	Peak chart positions				Certifications
Title	Album details	GER	AUT	NLD	SWI	Certifications
Ö-Tour ′88	Released: 1988; Label: Electrola Records; Formats: VHS, DVD	—	—	—	—	
Luxus – Live ′91	Released: 26 September 1991; Label: Electrola Records; Formats: VHS, DVD	—	—	—	—	
Unplugged Herbert	Released: 30 November 1995; Label: Electrola Records; Formats: VHS, DVD	—	—	—	—	
Stand der Dinge	Released: 13 November 2000; Label: Electrola Records; Formats: VHS, DVD	—	—	—	—	BVMI: 4× Platinum
Mensch – Live	Released: 10 November 2003; Label: Grönland Records; Formats: DVD, Blu-ray	1	1	—	34	BVMI: 6× Platinum; IFPI AUT: 2× Platinum
12 live	Released: 16 November 2007; Label: Grönland Records; Formats: DVD, Blu-ray	—	—	—	—	
Schiffsverkehr 2011 Tour	Released: 18 November 2011; Label: Grönland Records; Formats: DVD, Blu-ray	—	—	23	5	
Live at Montreux 2012	Released: 16 November 2012; Label: Eagle Records; Formats: DVD, Blu-ray	30	1	27	5	
I Walk – Live	Released: 10 September 2013; Label: Grönland Records; Formats: DVD, Blu-ray	—	—	—	—	
Dauernd jetzt – Live	Released: 30 October 2015; Label: Grönland Records; Formats: DVD, Blu-ray	—	—	—	—	
Tumult – Clubkonzert Berlin	Released: 8 March 2019; Label: Vertigo Records; Formats: DVD, Blu-ray	—	—	—	—	
"—" denotes a recording that did not chart or was not released in that territory.
