= Ernst-Happel-Stadion =

Stadium in Vienna

Ernst Happel Stadion
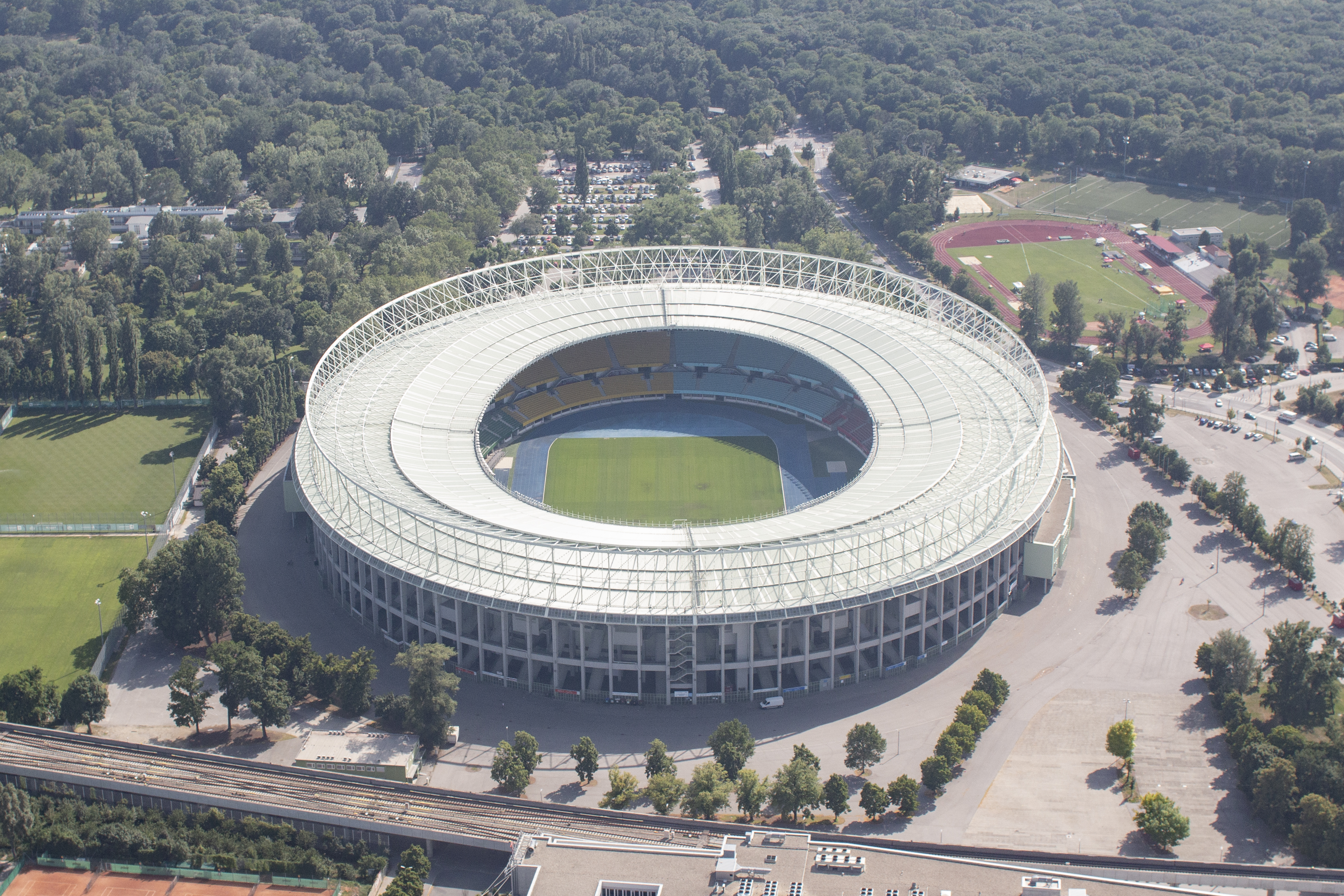
- UEFA
- Interactive map of Ernst Happel Stadion
- Former names: Praterstadion (1931–1992)
- Location: Meiereistraße 7, Vienna, Austria
- Coordinates: 48°12′26″N 16°25′15″E
- Owner: City of Vienna
- Operator: Wiener Stadthalle Betriebs- und Veranstaltungsgesellschaft m.b.H.
- Capacity: 50,865 (end-stage); 68,500 (center-stage)
- Type: UEFA Category 4 Stadium
- Surface: Lawn
- Record attendance: 90,726 (Austria vs. Spain, 30 October 1960)
- Field size: 105 m × 68 m (344 ft × 223 ft)

Construction
- Groundbreaking: 1929
- Built: 1929–1931
- Opened: 11 July 1931
- Renovated: 1986, 2008
- Cost: 39.6 million euros (conversion 2005-2008)
- Architect: Otto Ernst Schweizer

Tenants
- Austria national football team (1931–present, selected matches)

Ernst-Happel-Stadion, known as Praterstadion until 1992, is a football stadium in Leopoldstadt, the 2nd district of Austria's capital Vienna. With 50,865 seats, it is the largest stadium in Austria. It was built between 1929 and 1931 for the second Workers' Olympiad to the design of German architect Otto Ernst Schweizer. The stadium was renamed in honour of Austrian footballer Ernst Happel following his death in 1992. The stadium hosted seven games in UEFA Euro 2008, including the final which saw Spain triumph over Germany.

The stadium is owned by the City of Vienna (Municipal Department 51 – Sports of the City of Vienna). It is managed by the Wiener Stadthalle Betriebs und Veranstaltungsgesellschaft m.b.H., a subsidiary of Wien Holding. It is a UEFA Category 4 stadium, and as such, it is the home of the Austria national football team. It also hosts the Viennese clubs' matches in UEFA competitions.

The stadium is served by Stadion station on the U2 metro line, 18 tram line and 77A and 11A bus lines.

== History ==
=== 1928–1945 ===
The foundation stone was laid in November 1928 in honor of the 10-year celebration of the Republic of Austria. The stadium was constructed in 23 months, from 1929 to 1931. It was built according to a design by the Tübingen architect Otto Ernst Schweizer and the second Workers' Olympiad. Schweizer also designed the adjacent Stadionbad (with 400,000 sq m, Europe's largest swimming pool). According to its location in Vienna's Prater, it was initially named Prater Stadium. It was a modern stadium at the time, particularly in Europe, because of its short discharge time of only 7 to 8 minutes. Initially the stadium had a capacity of approximately 60,000 people.

During the Nazi era, following Anschluss (1938–1945), the stadium was used as a military barracks and staging area and as a temporary prison for the deportation of Jewish citizens. Between 11 and 13 September 1939, after the attack on Poland, over a thousand Polish-born Viennese Jews were detained on the orders of Reinhard Heydrich. They were imprisoned beneath the grandstands in the corridors of Section B. On 30 September, 1,038 prisoners were deported to the Buchenwald concentration camp. The next day, the stadium was back to being used as a football pitch. 44 men were released in early 1940, 26 were freed in 1945, the rest were murdered in the camps. In 1988, one of the surviving victims, Fritz Klein, was awarded compensation by the Austrian government equivalent to 62,50 euros for being detained in the stadium. In 2003 a memorial plaque, commemorating these events, was unveiled in the VIP area by a private initiative. In 1944, the stadium was severely damaged during a bomb attack on the Wehrmarcht Staff offices.

=== 1945–2000 ===
After the war and the reconstruction of the stadium, it was again sporting its original use. In 1956, the stadium's capacity was expanded to 92,708 people by Theodor Schull, but in 1965 the capacity was reduced. The attendance record was 90,726 spectators set on 30 October 1960 at the football match between Spain and Austria (0–3).

In 1970, the stadium was the venue of the 1970 European Cup Winners' Cup final which saw Manchester City F.C. beat Górnik Zabrze 2–1. Neil Young and a Francis Lee penalty sealed the win for City. This final was played under torrential rain in what was then an uncovered stadium. This along with the fact no Polish supporters were allowed to travel to the match restricted the attendance, which is variously reported at between 7,900 and 15,000 spectators.

In the 1980s, the stands were covered and fully equipped with seats. At its reopening a friendly match against archrival Germany was organised. Austria won the match 4–1. After the death of former Austrian top player and coach Ernst Happel (1925–1992), the Prater Stadium was renamed after him in 1992.

In 1964, 1987, 1990, and 1995, the Ernst Happel Stadium was the venue of the European Cup/UEFA Champions League final.

== UEFA Euro 2008 ==
During the UEFA Euro 2008 tournament, the Ernst Happel-Stadion hosted seven games (three group matches involving Austria, two quarter-finals, a semifinal match, and the Final match). In preparation for the tournament, the first and second place additional rows of seats increased the stadium's capacity to 53,000 seats.

Leading up to the tournament, it was fitted with a heated pitch in the summer of 2005. In May 2008, a connection to the Vienna U-Bahn was established, easing access from all over the city. The cost of the rebuilding was €39,600,000.

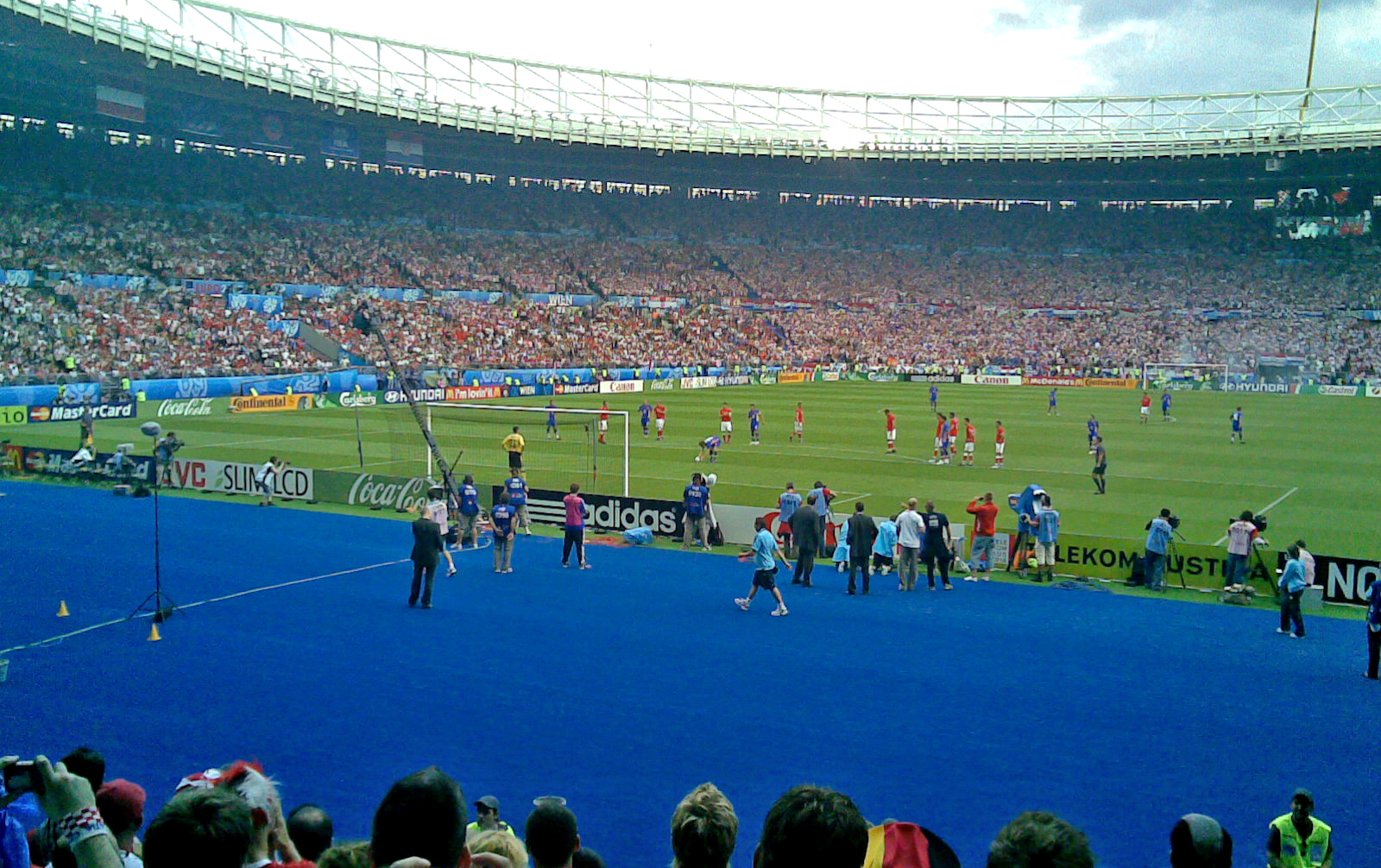
Stadium opening match in the Euro 2008 between Austria and Croatia

The following games were played at the stadium during the UEFA Euro 2008:

Date	Time (CET)	Team #1	Result	Team #2	Round	Spectators
8 June 2008	18.00	Austria	0–1	Croatia	Group B	51,428
12 June 2008	20.45	Austria	1–1	Poland	Group B	51,428
16 June 2008	20.45	Austria	0–1	Germany	Group B	51,428
20 June 2008	20.45	Croatia	1–1 (a.e.t.) (1–3 pen.)	Turkey	Quarter-finals	51,428
22 June 2008	20.45	Spain	0–0 (a.e.t.) (4–2 pen.)	Italy	Quarter-finals	48,000
26 June 2008	20.45	Russia	0–3	Spain	Semi-final	51,428
29 June 2008	20.45	Germany	0–1	Spain	Final	51,428

== Football ==
The Ernst Happel Stadium is the largest football stadium in Austria. It is the home of the Austria national football team. Club football matches are generally limited to the domestic cup final and international competitions featuring one of Vienna's top clubs, FK Austria Wien and SK Rapid Wien, as their regular stadiums are too small to host UEFA Champions League and UEFA Cup matches. Vienna derby matches between FK Austria and SK Rapid have also been played in the stadium.

The stadium is rated one of UEFA's Five Star Stadiums permitting it to host the UEFA Champions League final. The seating capacity was temporarily expanded to 53,008 for the UEFA Euro 2008 championship, with the final played in the stadium. The stadium also hosted 3 group games, 2 quarter-final matches, a semi-final and final. The attendance record of 92,706 for the match against the Soviet Union was in 1960. The capacity has since been reduced.

=== Notable matches held in the stadium ===
- 1964 European Cup Final: Internazionale 3–1 Real Madrid
- 1970 European Cup Winners' Cup Final: Manchester City 2–1 Górnik Zabrze
- 1987 European Cup Final: Porto 2–1 Bayern Munich
- 1990 European Cup Final: Milan 1–0 Benfica
- 1994 UEFA Cup Final: Internazionale 1–0 Austria Salzburg
- 1995 UEFA Champions League Final: Ajax Amsterdam 1–0 Milan
- UEFA Euro 2008 Final: Spain 1–0 Germany

== Other sports ==
Other sporting events are held in the stadium, including athletics, cycling and tennis. In 1950, 35,000 watched Austrian Josef Weidinger win the European Heavyweight crown against Stefan Olek (of France), and a temporary pool in the stadium was the venue for the 1995 European LC Championships.

During the 1950 and 1960s, motorcycle speedway took place at the stadium until the track was demolished. Major events included the final of the 1963 Speedway World Team Cup.

On 16 July 2011, the American Football World Championship final took place where USA defeated rivals Canada with a score of 50–7 in front of 20,000 spectators.

On 6 and 7 June 2014, the three games of the final stage of the 13th European Championship of American Football took place in this stadium. In the final 27,000 spectators saw Austria lose to Germany 30–27 in double overtime.

== Concerts ==
The stadium was scheduled to host Taylor Swift's Eras Tour for three shows from 8–10 August 2024. The shows were canceled out of caution on 7 August by its organiser after the revelation of a terror plot targeting the shows.

List of concerts at Ernst-Happel-Stadion, showing date, artist, tour and attendance
Date	Artist	Tour	Attendance
8 July 1980	Santana	—	—
3 July 1982	The Rolling Stones	European Tour 1982	—
14 June 1983	Supertramp	Famous Last Tour	—
16 June 1987	Genesis	Invisible Touch Tour	—
1 July 1987	David Bowie	Glass Spider Tour	—
2 June 1988	Michael Jackson	Bad World Tour	—
1 July 1988	Pink Floyd	A Momentary Lapse of Reason Tour	—
9 September 1988	Van Halen	OU812 Tour	—
16 September 1989	The Beach Boys	—	—
14 June 1990	Tina Turner	Foreign Affair: The Farewell Tour	—
31 July 1990	The Rolling Stones	Urban Jungle Tour	—
8 September 1990	Tina Turner	Foreign Affair: The Farewell Tour	—
24 May 1991	Herbert Groenemeyer	Luxus-Tour	—
18 July 1991	Simple Minds	Real Life Tour	—
13 June 1992	Elton John	The One Tour	—
3 July 1992	Dire Straits	On Every Street Tour	—
16 July 1992	Genesis	We Can't Dance Tour	—
25 July 1992	Bryan Adams	Waking Up the World Tour	—
26 August 1992	Michael Jackson	Dangerous World Tour	—
29 May 1993	Lenny Kravitz, Def Leppard, Robert Plant	Rock in Wien 1993	—
30 May 1993	INXS, Faith No More, Leonhard Cohen	Rock in Wien 1993	—
2 June 1993	Guns N' Roses	Use Your Illusion Tour	—
3 September 1993	Bon Jovi	I'll Sleep When I'm Dead Tour	—
5 July 1995	R.E.M.	Monster Tour	—
22 June 1996	The Kelly Family	—	—
3 July 1996	Tina Turner	Wildest Dreams Tour	—
10 July 1996	Tina Turner	Wildest Dreams Tour	—
13 July 1996	Luciano Pavarotti	—	—
2 July 1997	Michael Jackson	HIStory World Tour	—
16 June 1998	Elton John & Billy Joel	Face to Face 1998	—
1 July 1998	Eros Ramazzotti	—	—
1 August 2000	Tina Turner	Twenty Four Seven Tour	—
29 June 2001	Bon Jovi	One Wild Night Tour	—
24 May 2003	Herbert Groenemeyer	Mensch Open Air-Tour 2003	—
28 May 2003	Bon Jovi	Bounce Tour	—
18 June 2003	The Rolling Stones	Licks World Tour	—
28 June 2003	Bruce Springsteen	The Rising Tour	—
4 July 2003	Robbie Williams	2003 Tour	—
13 June 2003	Elton John	—	—
2 July 2005	U2	Vertigo Tour	55,645
14 July 2006	The Rolling Stones	A Bigger Bang	—
18 August 2006	Robbie Williams	Close Encounters Tour	—
19 August 2006	Robbie Williams	Close Encounters Tour	—
27 May 2007	Herbert Groenemeyer	12	—
24 May 2009	AC/DC	Black Ice World Tour	—
5 July 2009	Bruce Springsteen	Working on a Dream Tour	37,798
30 August 2010	U2	U2 360° Tour	69,253
18 June 2011	Herbert Groenemeyer	Schiffsverkehr	—
22 July 2011	Bon Jovi	Bon Jovi Live	56,280
11 July 2012	Bruce Springsteen	Wrecking Ball World Tour	50,293
29 July 2012	Madonna	The MDNA Tour	33,250
27 June 2013	Paul McCartney	Out There Tour	—
23 August 2013	Roger Waters	The Wall Live	36,385
16 June 2014	The Rolling Stones	14 On Fire	57,700
10 June 2015	One Direction	On the Road Again Tour	43,788
30 June 2015	Helene Fischer	Farbenspiel Live	—
1 July 2015	Helene Fischer	Farbenspiel Live	—
19 May 2016	AC/DC	Rock or Bust World Tour	50,364
11 June 2017	Coldplay	A Head Full of Dreams Tour	56,246
10 July 2017	Guns N' Roses	Not in This Lifetime... Tour	54,847
11 July 2018	Helene Fischer	Helene Fischer Live 2017/2018	—
26 August 2017	Robbie Williams	The Heavy Entertainment Show Tour	—
7 August 2018	Ed Sheeran	÷ Tour	—
8 August 2018	Ed Sheeran	÷ Tour	—
2 June 2019	Phil Collins	Still Not Dead Yet Live Tour	—
17 July 2019	Bon Jovi	This House Is Not For Sale Tour	—
24 July 2019	P!nk	Beautiful Trauma World Tour	55,873
16 August 2019	Metallica	WorldWired Tour	54,176
22 August 2019	Rammstein	Europe Stadium Tour 2019	—
23 August 2019	Rammstein	Europe Stadium Tour 2019	—
31 August 2019	Andreas Gabalier	10 Jahre Volks Rock'n Roll 2019	—
19 June 2022	Green Day, Fall Out Boy, Weezer	Hella Mega Tour	—
13 July 2022	Guns N' Roses	Guns N' Roses 2020 Tour	—
15 July 2022	The Rolling Stones	Sixty	57,141
1 September 2022	Ed Sheeran	+–=÷× Tour	124,800
2 September 2022	Ed Sheeran	+–=÷× Tour	124,800
1 July 2023	P!nk	Pink Summer Carnival	—
2 July 2023	P!nk	Pink Summer Carnival	—
8 July 2023	Harry Styles	Love On Tour	—
14 July 2023	Red Hot Chili Peppers	Global Stadium Tour	—
18 July 2023	Bruce Springsteen	2023 Tour	—
26 July 2023	Rammstein	Rammstein Stadium Tour	—
27 July 2023	Rammstein	Rammstein Stadium Tour	—
23 June 2024	AC/DC	Power Up Tour	118,066
26 June 2024	AC/DC	Power Up Tour	118,066
21 August 2024	Coldplay	Music of the Spheres World Tour	251,399
22 August 2024	Coldplay	Music of the Spheres World Tour	251,399
24 August 2024	Coldplay	Music of the Spheres World Tour	251,399
25 August 2024	Coldplay	Music of the Spheres World Tour	251,399
12 July 2025	Robbie Williams	Robbie Williams Live 2025	—
14 July 2025	Justin Timberlake	JT Live 2025	—
17 July 2025	Iron Maiden	Run for Your Lives World Tour	—
24 July 2025	Guns N' Roses	Because What You Want & What You Get Are Two Completely Different Things Tour	—
9 June 2026	Linkin Park	From Zero World Tour	—
3 July 2026	Foo Fighters	Take Cover Tour	—
21 July 2027	Stray Kids	Run It World Tour	—

== See also ==
- Lists of stadiums

Events and tenants
Preceded by Wembley Stadium; London	European Cup; Final venue 1964	Succeeded by San Siro; Milan
Preceded by St. Jakob Stadium; Basel	European Cup Winners' Cup; Final venue 1970	Succeeded by Karaiskakis Stadium; Athens
Preceded by Estadio Ramón Sánchez Pizjuán; Seville	European Cup; Final venue 1987	Succeeded by Neckarstadion; Stuttgart
Preceded by Camp Nou; Barcelona	European Cup; Final venue 1990	Succeeded by Stadio San Nicola; Bari
Preceded by Olympic Stadium; Athens	UEFA Champions League; Final venue 1995	Succeeded by Stadio Olimpico; Rome
Preceded by Estádio da Luz; Lisbon	UEFA European Championship; Final venue 2008	Succeeded by NSC Olimpiyskyi; Kyiv
Preceded by Todoroki Athletics Stadium; Kawasaki	IFAF World Championship; Final venue 2011	Succeeded by Tele2 Arena; Stockholm
