= Leonard Bernstein Conducts West Side Story =

1985 studio recording

Studio album by Leonard Bernstein, Kiri Te Kanawa, José Carreras, Tatiana Troyanos, Kurt Ollmann, Marilyn Horne, pick-up orchestra
- Released: 1985
- Recorded: 1984
- Studios: Emil Berliner Studios, Berlin; RCA Studios New York
- Label: Deutsche Grammophon
- Producer: John McClure

Leonard Bernstein Conducts West Side Story, or simply West Side Story, is a 1985 album containing an "operatic" production of the musical West Side Story as orchestrated and conducted by Leonard Bernstein for the Deutsche Grammophon record label, with Kiri Te Kanawa and José Carreras in the leading parts. It was the first time that Bernstein conducted a complete performance of that work.

== Background ==
Bernstein recalled to his biographer, Humphrey Burton: "l'd always thought of West Side Story in terms of teenagers and there are no teenage opera singers, it's just a contradiction in terms. But this is a recording and people don't have to look 16, they don't have to be able to dance or act a rather difficult play eight times a week. And therefore, we took this rather unorthodox step of casting number-one world-class opera singers. I suppose the only foreseeable problem was that they might sound too old – but they don't, they just sound marvellous!”.

== Recording ==
The album was produced by John McClure.

The recording was made by Deutsche Grammophon in 1984 at the Emil Berliner Studios in Berlin and the RCA Studios New York.

=== The Making of West Side Story ===
The BBC filmed the recording sessions, and Deutsche Grammophon released it on DVD. The documentary is known under the titles Leonard Bernstein Conducts West Side Story: The Making of the Recording and The Making of West Side Story. PBS showed it on Great Performances. Several unreleased clips show Carreras struggling with the score and Bernstein's frustration.

== Cast ==
The production featured Kiri Te Kanawa as Maria, José Carreras as Tony, Tatiana Troyanos as Anita , Kurt Ollmann as Riff, and a pick-up orchestra. Marilyn Horne sang the off-stage voice in "Somewhere".

Other roles:

- Rosalia – Louise Edeiken
- Francisco – Angelina Reaux
- Consuela – Stella Zambalis
- Action – David Livingston
- Diesel – Marty Nelson
- Baby John – Stephen Bogardus
- A-rab – Peter Thom
- Snowboy – Todd Lester
- Bernardo – Richard Harrell
- Dialogue: Nina Bernstein (Maria), Alexander Bernstein (Tony)

== Critical reception ==
Professional ratings
Review scores
Source	Rating
AllMusic	4/5 stars

Thor Eckert Jr. of The Christian Science Monitor found that the British accent of Maria, a Puerto Rican, and the Spanish accent of Tony, who is American, is blurring the drama at the centre of the story. AllMusic rates the album four stars on a scale of five.

== Chart performance ==
The album became the first to top the "Classical" half of the newly established Billboard's Top Compact Discs chart on June 1, 1985.

== Track listing ==
2 × LP – Deutsche Grammophon 415 253

Side 1
No.	Title	Length
1.	"No. 1 Prologue"	4:05
2.	"No. 2 Jet Song"	3:11
3.	"No. 3 Something's Coming"	2:32
4.	"No. 4 The dance at the gym: Blues – Promenade – Mambo – Cha-Cha; Meeting scene, Jump"	7:45

Side 2
No.	Title	Length
1.	"No. 5 Maria"	15:19
2.	"No. 6 Balcony scene – Tonight"	7:29
3.	"No. 7 America"	4:48

Side 3
No.	Title	Length
1.	"No. 8 Cool; Fugue"	4:36
2.	"No. 9 One Hand, One Heart"	5:38
3.	"No. 10 Tonight"	3:40
4.	"No. 11 The rumble"	3:03

Side 4
No.	Title	Length
1.	"No. 12 I Feel Pretty"	3:21
2.	"No. 13 Ballet sequence – Scherzo – Somewhere – Procession and nightmare"	9:04
3.	"No. 14 Gee, Officer Krupke"	4:20
4.	"No. 15 A Boy like That / I Have a Love"	5:36
5.	"No. 16 Taunting scene"	1:26
6.	"No. 17 Finale"	2:36

== Charts ==
Chart (1985–1986)	Peak position
US Billboard Top Compact Discs – Classical	1
US Billboard Top Crossover Albums	8

=== Highlights version ===
Chart (1986)	Peak position
US Billboard Top Crossover Albums	5

== Awards ==
Year	Award type	Categories	Results	Ref.
1986	Grammy Awards	Best Cast Show Album	Won	
