= Hansa Tonstudio =

German recording studio

Hansa Studios
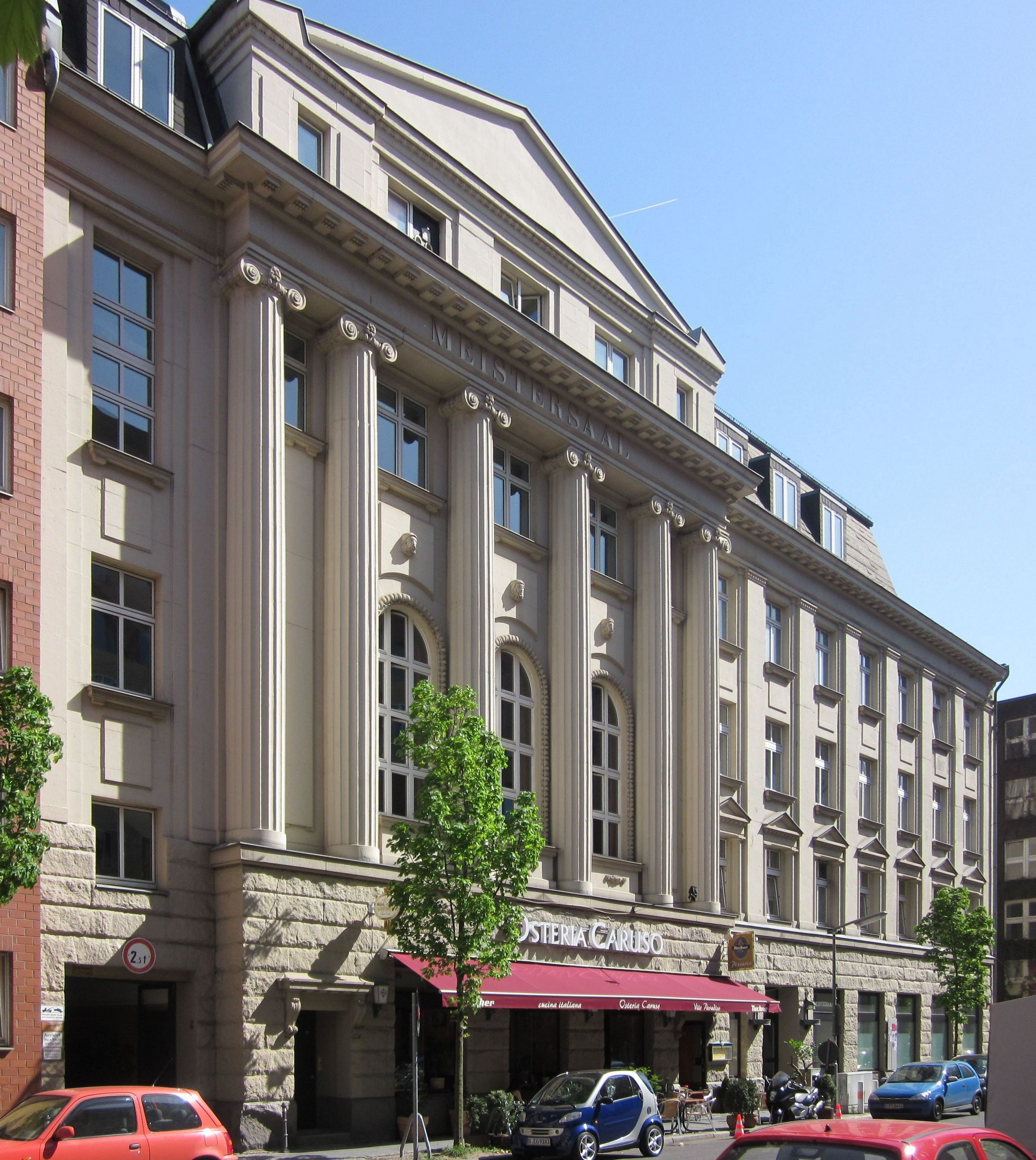
- Facade on Köthener Strasse
- Interactive map of Hansa Studios
- Address: Köthener Strasse 38, Berlin 10963, Germany
- Location: Berlin
- Coordinates: 52°30′23.2″N 13°22′38.97″E
- Type: recording studio

Construction
- Built: 1913
- Opened: 1962

Website
- hansastudios.de/en/home/

Hansa Tonstudio is a recording studio located in the Kreuzberg district of Berlin, Germany. The studio, famous for its Meistersaal recording hall, is situated approximately 150 metres (yards) from the former Berlin Wall, giving rise to its former nicknames of "Hansa Studio by the Wall" or "Hansa by the Wall". Today, Hansa Studios' fully-restored Meistersaal is used for recording, as well as for concerts and other events.

== History ==
In 1962 brothers Peter and Thomas Meisel of Edition Meisel & Co. founded Hansa Musik Produktion company and the Hansa Records label. The label's name (and the name of the related recording studio) was inspired by the Hanseatic League, a medieval Northern European maritime trade network. Beginning in 1965, Hansa rented Ariola Records' production facilities at the historic Meistersaal located within the building at Köthener Straße 38. The company built its own recording studio at its offices in 1969, before establishing Hansa Studio I on Nestorstrasse in Berlin's Halensee neighbourhood in 1973.

In 1975, the Meisel brothers bought the Köthener Strasse building from Ariola and assumed management of the Meistersaal studio, which they named Hansa Studio II, establishing a total of five studio rooms in the building. The studios were used for Hansa's Schlager productions as well as operas and film soundtracks, and the combination of Hansa's good equipment and the outstanding acoustics of the Meistersaal, as well as the studio's affordability for international clients attracted a growing number of projects.

In 1976, David Bowie and Iggy Pop came to Berlin to complete their respective albums Low and The Idiot at Hansa's studios before also recording their follow-up albums, "Heroes" and Lust for Life at Hansa with producer Tony Visconti and Brian Eno. Bowie is said to have written Heroes at a window of the studio, from which he saw Visconti kiss backing vocalist Antonia Maass, an image that made it into the song's lyrics.

In the late 1970s, Hansa Studio 1 was closed and its equipment was used to build a second studio within the Köthener Strasse building, which opened in 1980. Hansa purchased three custom Solid State Logic SL 4000 E consoles in a color scheme that's come to be known as "Hansa blue" (two of these consoles are still in use). A third studio, located on the building's ground floor, was added in 1982. The studios hosted numerous notable acts in the late 1970s through the 1980s, including Tangerine Dream, Nina Hagen Band, Killing Joke, David Sylvian, Nick Cave and The Bad Seeds, Marillion, Siouxsie and the Banshees, Wire, and The Psychedelic Furs, firmly establishing the studio's reputation in the post-punk and synthpop genres.

In 1983, Depeche Mode, Daniel Miller, and Gareth Jones mixed Construction Time Again at Hansa, and returned to the studio to record the band's breakthrough single "People Are People" and subsequent album, Some Great Reward, with band member Martin Gore recording "Somebody" in the Meistersaal in the nude.

After 1993, due to declining demand for large recording studios, the Meisels decided to focus primarily on Hansa Studio 1 and discontinue use of Studio 2 and 3. Hansa Studio 2 was restored back to the Meistersaal, which is also available as a recording space. The former Hansa mixing room was permanently rented, and serves as headquarters to Swedish producer/engineer Michael Ilbert. Offices for film production companies were built into Studio 3, and in 2010 Emil Berliner Studios relocated to that studio, which is no longer part of Hansa Studios.

In late 1990, U2 began work on Achtung Baby at Hansa Studios before relocating to a rented house near Dublin to continue work on the album.

More recently, Hansa Studios has been utilized for projects by Manic Street Preachers, R.E.M., Snow Patrol, Kent, Living Things and Go Go Berlin.

== References in popular culture ==
The band performances for the music video for the track Kayleigh by Marillion were filmed in the Meistersaal with exterior shots filmed in the surrounding areas of West Berlin.

The first of three videos created for U2's 1992 song "One", directed by Anton Corbijn, featured the band members performing at Hansa Studios.

In 2018, the studio was the subject of a documentary feature by filmmaker Mike Christie titled Hansa Studios: By The Wall 1976-90, which aired across Europe on Sky Arts and Sky Arte.

== Selected list of Hansa Studio recordings (by year) ==
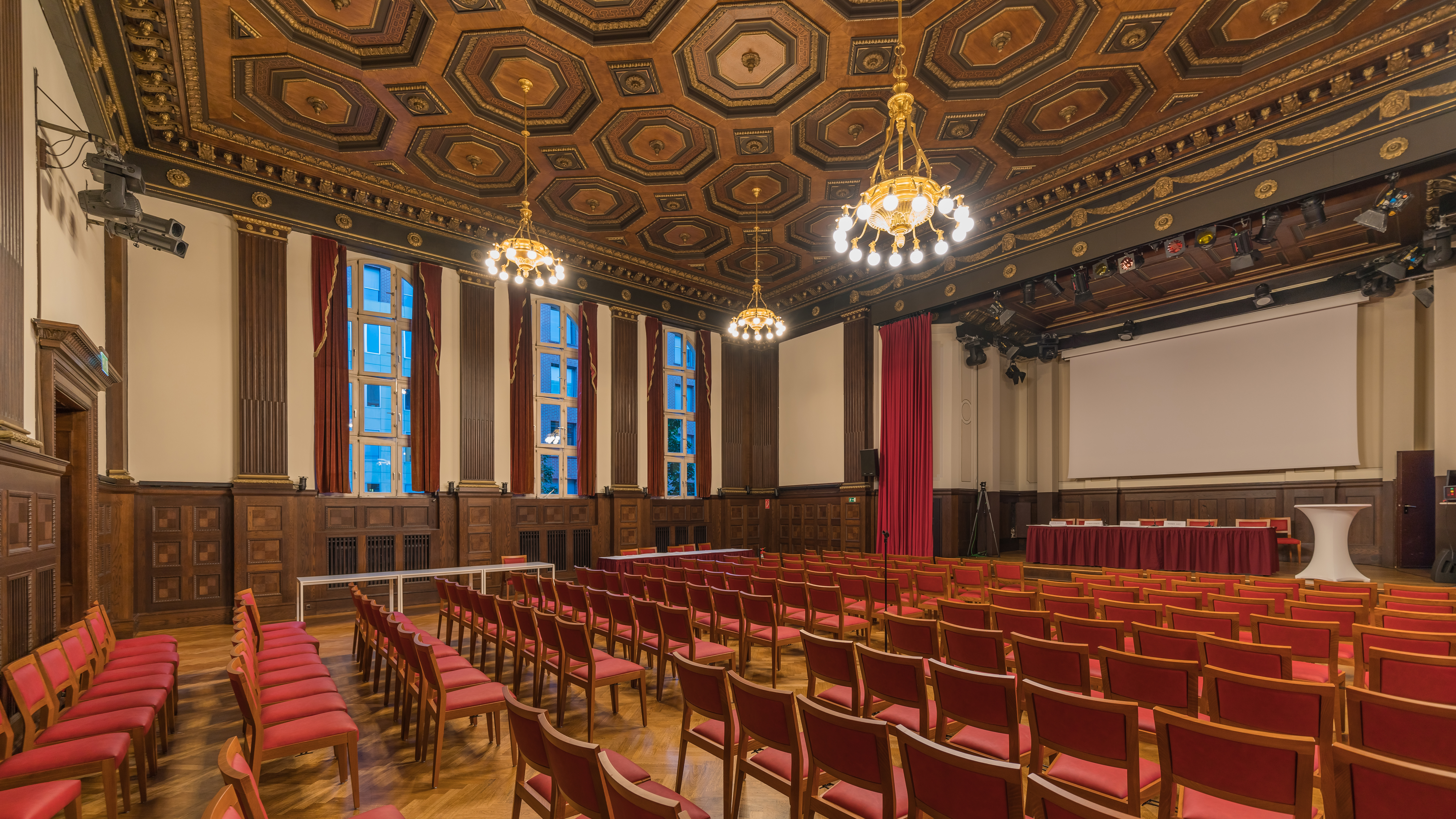
Meistersaal

Iggy Pop- The Passenger (1977)

- David Bowie - Low (1977)
- Iggy Pop - The Idiot (1977)
- David Bowie: "Heroes" (1977)
- Iggy Pop: Lust for Life (1977)
- Nina Hagen Band: Nina Hagen Band (1978)
- Tangerine Dream: Force Majeure (1979)
- Nina Hagen Band: Unbehagen (1979)
- David Bowie: Baal (1982)
- Depeche Mode: Construction Time Again (1983) (mixing)
- Killing Joke: Night Time (1984)
- David Sylvian – Brilliant Trees (1984)
- Nick Cave and The Bad Seeds – The Firstborn Is Dead (1984)
- Depeche Mode – Some Great Reward (1984)
- Einstürzende Neubauten – Halber Mensch (1985)
- Marillion – Misplaced Childhood (1985)
- Depeche Mode – Black Celebration (1986)
- Killing Joke – Brighter Than a Thousand Suns (1986)
- Ministry - Twitch (1986)
- Nick Cave and The Bad Seeds – Your Funeral... My Trial (1986)
- Siouxsie and the Banshees – Tinderbox (1986)
- Wire – The Ideal Copy (1987)
- The Gun Club – Mother Juno (1987)
- The Psychedelic Furs - Midnight to Midnight (1987)
- Stump – A Fierce Pancake (1988)
- Pixies – Bossanova (1990)
- U2 – Achtung Baby (1991)
- Snow Patrol - A Hundred Million Suns (2008)
- Supergrass – Diamond Hoo Ha (2008)
- Ossler – Ett Brus (2008)
- Kent – Röd (2009)
- KT Tunstall – Tiger Suit (2010)
- R.E.M. - Collapse into Now (2011)
- Herbert Grönemeyer – Schiffsverkehr (2011)
- Royal Republic - Save the Nation (2012)
- Hank & Cupcakes - Naked (2013)
- Manic Street Preachers – Rewind the Film (2013)
- Manic Street Preachers – Futurology (2014)
- In Flames – Siren Charms (2014)
- Herbert Grönemeyer – Dauernd jetzt (2014)
- Ling Tosite Sigure – Es or S (2015)
- TK from Ling Tosite Sigure – Secret Sensation (2016)
- Rome – Hansa Studios Session (2017)
- Vetusta Morla – Mismo Sitio, Distinto Lugar (2017)
- Chvrches – Hansa Session (EP) (2018)
- Pet Shop Boys – Hotspot (2020)
- Parcels – Live Vol.1 (album) (2020)
- Blood Incantation - Absolute Elsewhere (2024)
- Biffy Clyro - Futique (2025)

== See also ==
- Meisel Music
- Hansa Records
