= Bochum (disambiguation) =

Bochum is a city in North Rhine-Westphalia, Germany. Bochum may also refer to:

== Places ==
- Bochum, Limpopo, a town in South Africa

== Germany ==
- Bochum Observatory, a research institute in Bochum, Nordrhein-Westfalen, Germany.

== Music ==
- 4630 Bochum, studio album by Herbert Grönemeyer
- Bochum Welt, electronic musician
- Bochum Total, annual music festival in Bochum, Germany

== Sports ==
- TuS Bochum, Turn- und Sportverein Bochum 1908, was a German association football club from the city of Bochum, North Rhine-Westphalia
- VfL Bochum, German association football club based in the city of Bochum, North Rhine-Westphalia
