= I Walk =

Studio album by Herbert Grönemeyer
- Released: 19 October 2012
- Genre: Soft rock
- Length: 53:04
- Label: Grönland
- Producer: Herbert Grönemeyer, Alex Silva

Herbert Grönemeyer chronology
Schiffsverkehr (2011)	I Walk (2012)	Dauernd jetzt (2014)

I Walk is the fifth English-language album by German singer Herbert Grönemeyer, released in October 2012. All songs on this album are sung in English. Ten of these songs are English reworks of previous works, and three are newly written songs for this album.

The album peaked at #18 in Germany, #19 in Austria and #48 in Switzerland.

== Track listing ==
No.	Title	Original German title	Length
1.	"Mensch (feat. Bono)"	Mensch	4:33
2.	"All That I Need"	Glück	3:54
3.	"Will I Ever Learn (feat. Antony Hegarty)"		3:52
4.	"Keep Hurting Me"		3:02
5.	"To the Sea (feat. James Dean Bradfield)"	Zum Meer	5:17
6.	"Because of You"	Zu Dir	3:56
7.	"Before the Morning"	Deine Zeit	3:50
8.	"I Walk"	Ich versteh	3:34
9.	"Airplanes in My Head"	Flugzeuge im Bauch	4:31
10.	"Behind the Glass"	Stand der Dinge	4:05
11.	"Same Old Boys"		3:22
12.	"The Tunnel"	Erzähl mir von Morgen	4:36
13.	"Mensch"	Mensch	4:32
