= Dietrich Grönemeyer =

German professor of medicine (b.1952)

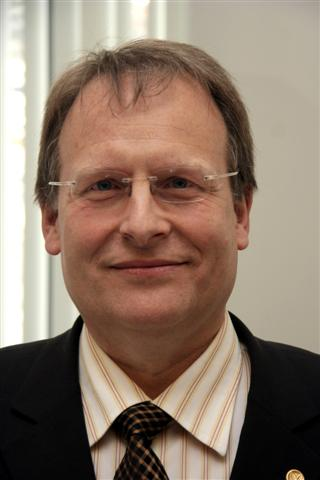
Dietrich Grönemeyer.

Dietrich H. W. Grönemeyer (born 12 November 1952) is a German professor of medicine and one of the inventors of Microtherapy. He grew up in Bochum with his two brothers. One of them, Herbert Grönemeyer, is a popular musician.

After studying sinology and romance languages in Bochum and medicine in Kiel Grönemeyer graduated in 1978. In 1982 he received a Ph.D., and at the Witten/Herdecke University in 1990 he finished his habilitation, a work that is usually needed in Germany to become a university professor.

He is the director of the "Grönemeyer Institute for MicroTherapy" in Bochum, and he teaches radiology and microtherapy at the privately financed Witten/Herdecke University. He is also a visiting professor at Harvard Medical School in Boston, Georgetown University in Washington, D.C., and Steinbeis-Hochschule in Berlin.

== Publications ==
- with Rainer M. Seibel: Interventionelle Computertomographie. Wien 1989, ISBN 3-89412-061-4.
- with Robert B. Lufkin: Open Field Magnetic Resonance Imaging. Berlin u. a. 1999, ISBN 3-540-63781-8.
