= Meistersaal =

Building in Berlin, Germany

Coordinates: 52°30′22″N 13°22′37″E

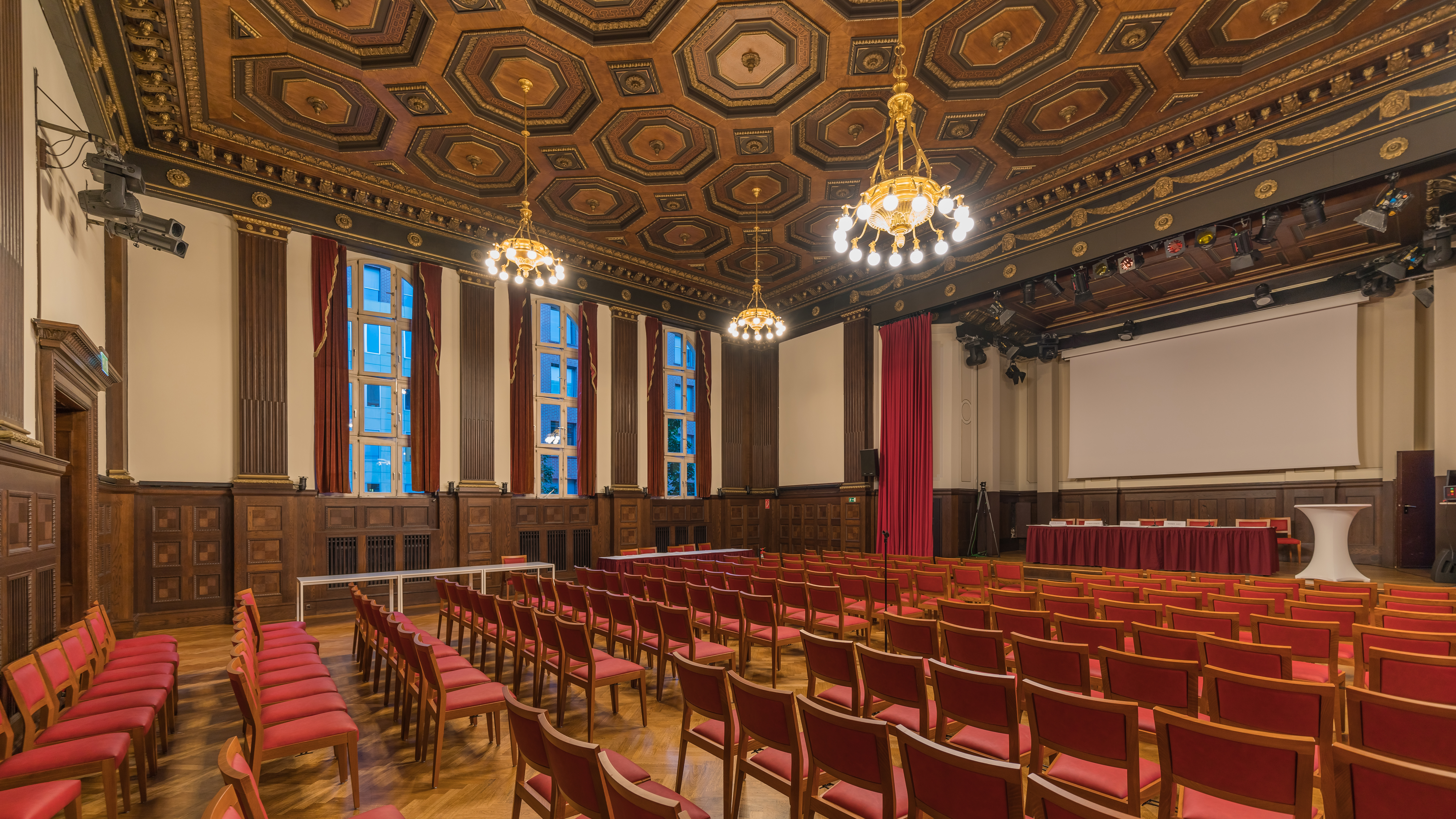
Meistersaal interior

The Meistersaal is a historic concert hall in Berlin, Germany. Built in 1910 as a chamber music concert hall, the building today enjoys protected building status. It is located in Berlin-Mitte near Potsdamer Platz. Its major claim to fame stems from the times when it was Studio 2 of Hansa Tonstudio. Since the 1990s, the Meistersaal has found use as a location for all manner of events.

== History ==
=== 1910–1913: Foundation ===
In 1910 the Real Estate Association of Berlin and its Suburbs – which later became the Guild of Maisons – bought the plot of land on the Köthener Straße 38, with the intent of building the association's head office on the site. After three years of construction the building was completed with offices for the association together with some solicitors' offices as well as a bookshop. It was officially opened by the association's chairman, Otto Heuer, in October 1913. Even in its early days many small meetings and concerts were held within its 266-square-metre (2,860 sq ft) chamber music room located at the building's centre. The name Meistersaal was first coined as part of the invitation for tender for the project. The room found further use as the venue for the graduation ceremonies of the newly qualified guildsmen.

=== The swinging 1920s ===
In the 1920s the Meistersaal started to build a reputation for itself amongst the blooming artistic scene in Berlin. On the ground floor of the building the publishers Malik-Verlag, under the management of Wieland Herzfelde, and the Gallery George Grosz took up residence here. And on 27 January 1921 Kurt Tucholsky performed a reading in the Meistersaal.

Furthermore, stars of the nascent silver screen made regular appearances here such as the silent film actor Carl de Vogt and Ludwig Hardt staged frequent performances in the Meistersaal. As a result of some rather controversial exhibitions held in the ground floor gallery, which took a critical look at social issues of the times and gained some notoriety in Berlin, The Guild of Masons, who considered themselves to be representatives of conservative morality, refused to extend the leases to their unpopular tenants. Therefore, the Malik-Verlag house was forced to find new premises in 1926. Today their presence here is commemorated by a plaque.

=== 1933–1945: National Socialistic times and the 2nd World War ===
From 1933 the State Chamber Music Orchestra held their concerts in the Meistersaal and in 1936 the Chilean pianist Claudio Arrau held a series of concerts here performing the entire piano works of Johann Sebastian Bach, a feat that aided considerably his subsequent fame and popularity. During the night from the 22 to 23 November 1943 the rear wing of the building was completely destroyed by an allied bombing attack. The Meistersaal itself remained relatively intact although during the war no further events took place there.

=== 1945–1961: Ballhaus Susi and Cabaret ===
In 1945 the Guild was dispossessed by the Allied forces. The building was put under marshal ownership and after some essential renovation work the building was used mostly as a concert hall under different forms of management whilst on the ground floor a cinema was introduced. Although attempts to establish the Meistersaal as a theatre failed to make an impact, the venue became popular for cabaret performers for example the famous magician Fredo Marvelli. In 1948 the Meistersaal was renamed as Ballhaus City and then later in 1953 as Ballhaus Susi. It continued in this guise until the erecting of the Berlin wall in 1961 which brought about an abrupt end to activities. Its location which once placed it at the epi-centre of a bourgeoning capital city, now left it high and dry, cut off from its public, at the centre only of a political dispute.

=== 1961–1976: Recording studios of Ariola ===
From 1961 the record label Ariola used the Meistersaal as a recording studio. Amongst the famous artists of this epoque who recorded here were the composer and conductor Robert Stolz, the Tenor Rudolf Schock, Peter Kreuder, Ivan Rebroff, Erika Köth, René Kollo, Norbert Schultze, Peter Alexander as well as the Swedish singer and actress Zarah Leander. Its proximity to the Berlin Wall now left it in a quiet backwater, the ideal pre-requisite for locating a recording studio.

=== 1976–1991: Period of Hansa recording studio ===
In 1976, the music publishing group Meisel Musikverlage bought the entire building in the Köthener Straße 38 and created within it five Hansa Tonstudio studios. Many of the bomb-damaged rooms were renovated and converted to meet the demands of a recording studio. A restaurant opened on the ground floor, whereas the Meistersaal was reborn as Studio 2. Over the next years, the Meistersaal became famous worldwide within the music industry as it was the recording studio of choice for many pop stars from around the globe, including U2, Iggy Pop, Depeche Mode, David Bowie, Eartha Kitt, Richard Clayderman, Marillion, Mike Batt, David Byrne, Nick Cave, Snow Patrol, Jon Bon Jovi and Supergrass to name but a few. Rubbing shoulders with the international stars were the local heroes of the time, including Peter Maffay, Udo Lindenberg, Udo Jürgens, Roland Kaiser, Nina Hagen, Einstürzende Neubauten, Nena, Marianne Rosenberg, Die Toten Hosen, Heiner Pudelko, Ute Lemper, Trio, Reinhard Mey, Max Raabe, Jack White and Paul Kuhn.

The falling of the Berlin Wall in 1989 meant the Meistersaal was back in the throng of things and lost some of the advantage it had had for recording music. Concurrently, the overall demand for recording studios of this kind was also in decline, meaning Studio 2 became no longer economically feasible and was closed. However, it went out with a bang as the last production done there was Achtung Baby by U2.

=== Since 1991 ===
Thomas Meisel, co-founder of the Hansa Music Produktion and owner of the building, decided to return the Meistersaal as near as possible to its original condition and run it as an event location. The restoration work began on 1 March 1993 and lasted 18 months, more than twice as long as originally intended. One of the main reasons for this was that a commemorative brochure from the original opening of the Meistersaal from 1913 came to light showing pictures of the rooms in their original condition. Although most of the work was almost finished by then certain areas had to be completely changed to remain true to the original. From October 1994 the Meistersaal was under the directorship of Kurt Lutz, co-founder of the "Berliner Globe Theatre" which had been located in what was previously the Hotel Esplanade on the Potsdamer Platz. He also went on to perform here himself for a period of time. The programmes concentrated on piano and choral evenings, theatre pieces and readings. However, without state support it was unable to pay for itself. Towards the end of 2002 Mr Lutz left the Meistersaal and was superseded by the auctioneer Mark Karhausen; Although his reign, as it were, was fairly short lived too, spanning some six years. In February 2009, after a further phase of technical refurbishment, the Meistersaal was re-opened for a third time, this time through the auspices of BESL Business Event Services & Locations GmbH. Since then the Meistersaal has been run as an event location and platform for cultural events. And after Emil Berliner Studios (which was once the recording studios for Deutschen Grammophon) relocated to the premises in 2010, the rooms are once again being used to record music.

In 2018, the story of Meistersaal featured within the documentary feature by filmmaker Mike Christie titled 'Hansa Studios: By The Wall 1976-90' which aired across Europe on Sky Arts and Sky Arte.

== Architecture ==
The Meistersaal-Ensemble with its associated rooms today extends over two floors and covers a total area of some 650 sq metres, of which 266 sq metres is the Meistersaal itself (including stage). On the ground floor the foyer and cloakroom are located. Leading up from here is the staircase to the first floor lobby which itself leads to the Meistersaal and the adjacent Grüner Salon. The 79 sq metre Grüner Salon is the official bar area of the Meistersaal complete with fixed bar-counter. Toilets can be found on both ground floor and first floor and after a general smoking ban was introduced in 2009 a smokers lounge was created next to the Grüner Salon.

=== The facade ===
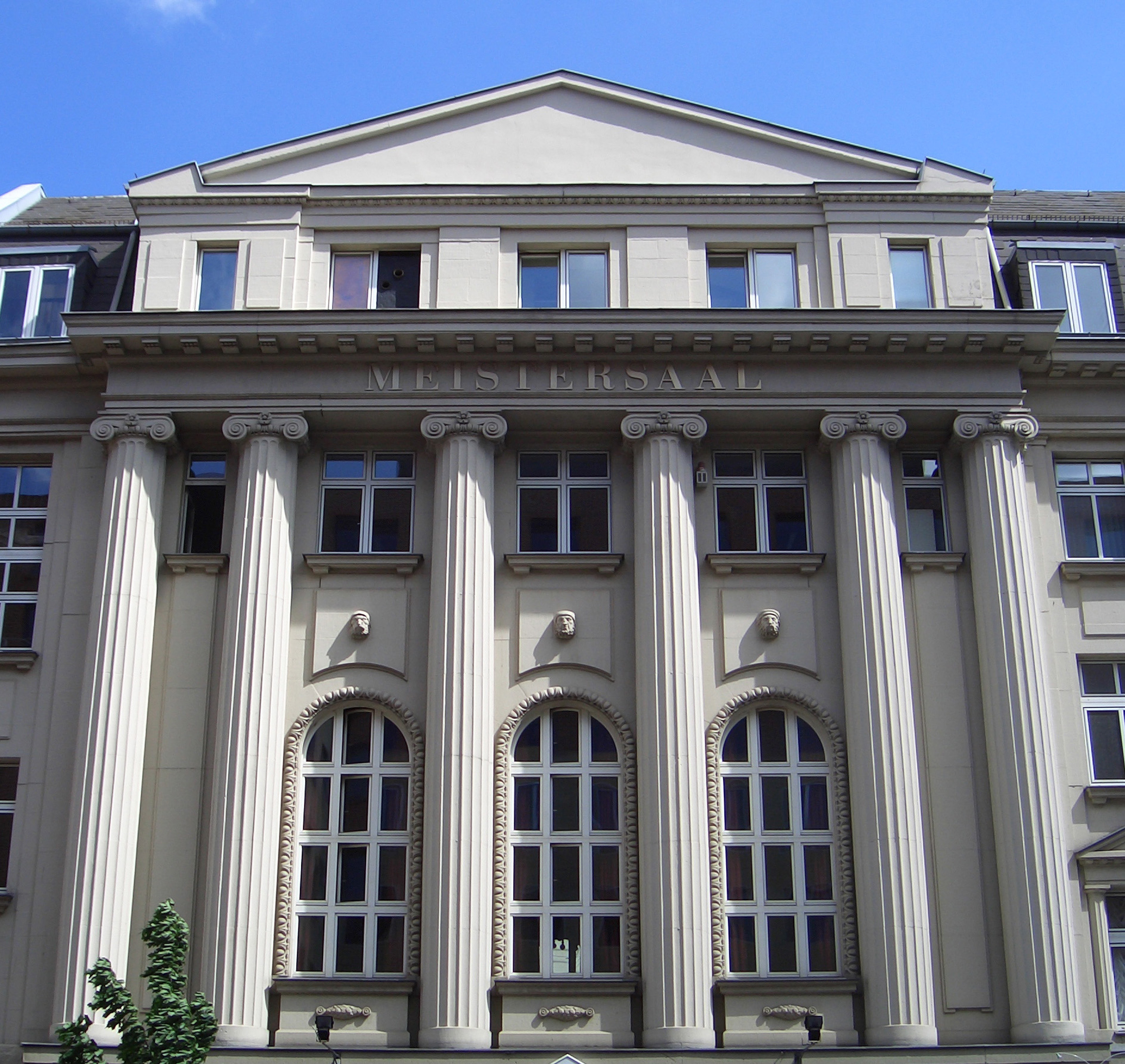
Front view of the Meistersaal today

The façade of the Meistersaal was restored in a strictly neo-classic style. Six period Ionian columns separate the northern part of the building from the rest. Within the frieze directly above the columns, the name and year of the association is engraved into the columns in triangular gables. Today you can see the word "Meistersaal" engraved in the frieze whilst the newly created gables are without writing or decoration.

=== The Entrance Area ===
The entrance area, originally known as the vestibules, is distinctive with its dark marble cladding and heralds the entrance to the foyer and the Meistersaal as well as providing access to the staircase and lifts to the offices. On the left hand side there is a display cabinet from the Meistersaal that only came to light during the restoration work and has subsequently itself been the subject of restoration. In the middle of the room there is a golden board with the signs of the companies residing in the building. To the right is a large mirror. Previously there was a small house for the concierge that was most probably removed during restoration.

=== The Foyer ===
The Foyer together with its staircase as it exists today was originally foreseen as a lobby area to the Meistersaal. When comparing to the original floor plans from 1913 one can ascertain that this part of the building has undergone the most constructional changes. A large part of the former cloakroom has been split by the building of a wall and now forms part of the restaurant adjacent to the Meistersaal. According to the original floor plans the ground floor contained only a ladies toilet; a gentleman’s toilet has subsequently been added. The ground floor also was home to the cashier’s desk but that is now no longer recognisable today.

=== Wandelhalle ===
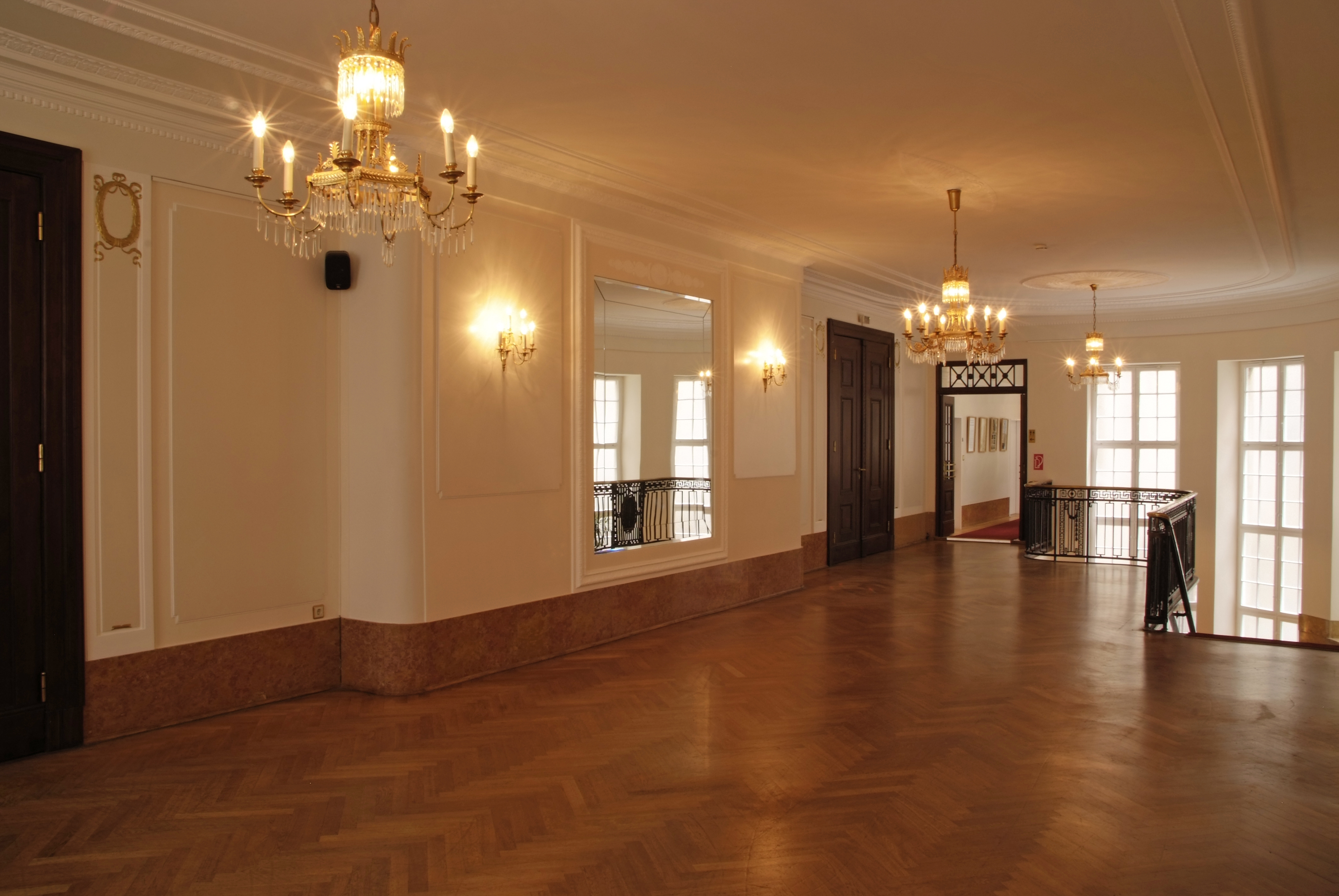
The Wandelhalle. Left the hall doors of the Meistersaal, in the background the passageway to the Green Salon.

From studying the photos found in the original commemorative brochure for the opening of the Meistersaal the Lobby has been re-built faithful to its original appearance. A distinctive feature of the Lobby alongside the many cornicing decorations on the ceiling are the two large mirrors, although one was split in the course of the restoration work and replaced as a mirrored door to allow access to the staircase. The Foyer allows access to the Meistersaal and to the toilets, also to the smoker’s lounge and the Green Salon as well as to the Meistersaal’s kitchen. The floor area of the Foyer covers 90 sq metres. During its times as "Ballhaus Susi" there was also a dedicated "Beer Buffet" bar as well as a "Liquor buffet".

=== Meistersaal ===
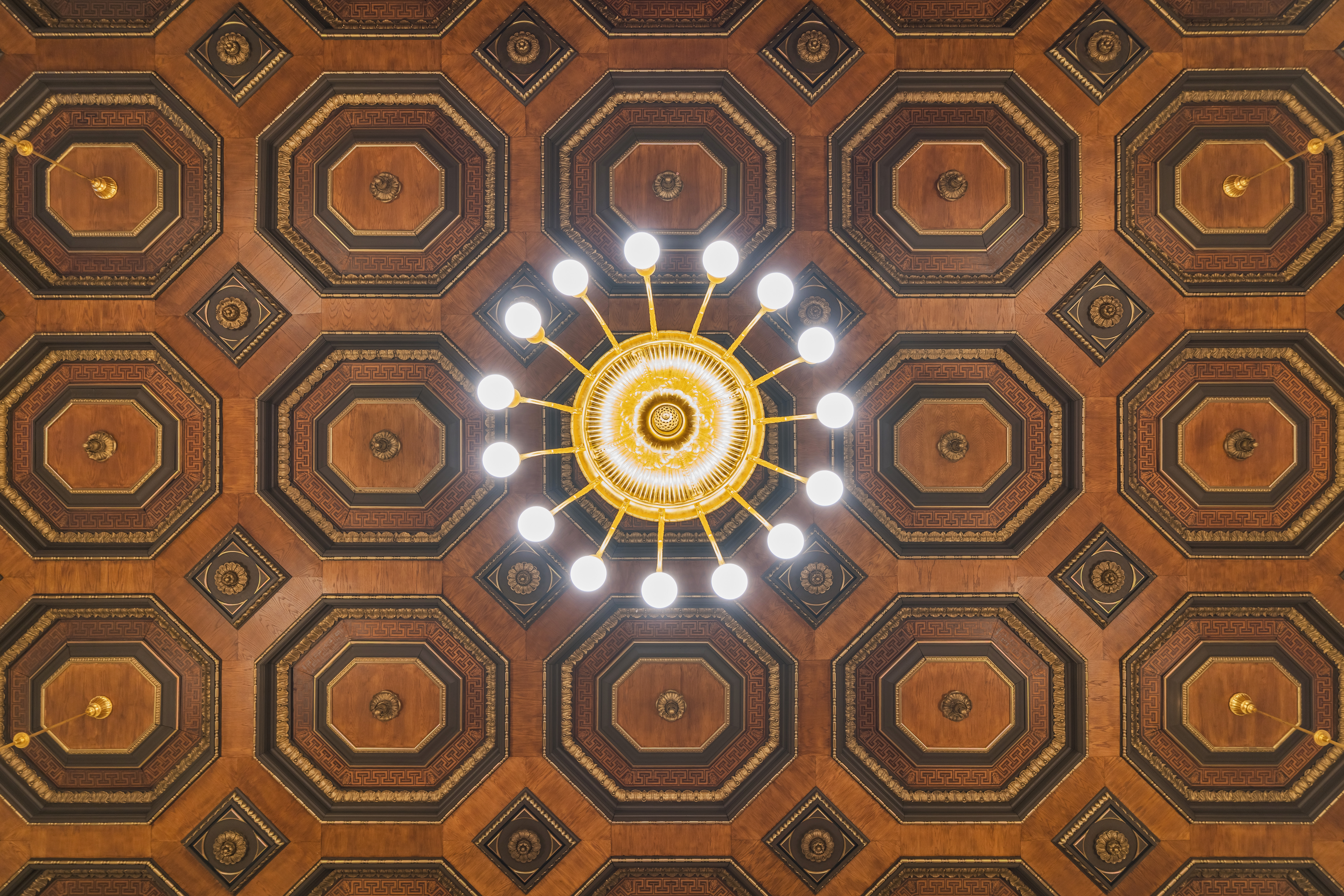
Coffered ceiling of the Meistersaal

One of the most striking constructional features of the Meistersaal, which was originally conceived as a chamber music concert hall, is its 7 metre high wooden coffered ceiling – inspired by the old Berlin Philharmony concert hall. Further architectural characteristics to be found within the room, which has also been restored to virtually its original condition, are the carefully inlaid gold cornicing on the ceiling as well as decorations on the walls through the wooden columns. Two large French doors provide access to the Meistersaal that has a 4 x 6 m stage built-in with two adjacent dressing rooms over two floors. The original fixed rows of seating were lost during or shortly before the end of the Second World War and were not replaced. Since its reopening in 1994 the Meistersaal has been equipped with a modern lighting and PA system which had to be carefully installed given its protected status. The most recent renovation work was carried out in spring 2009 and completed n the middle of the same year.

=== Grüner Salon ===
The bar area of the Meistersaal covers 79 sq metres which was then renamed as the Green Hall subsequent to the renovation work and then later re-christened as Green Salon. It is tastefully decorated in green throughout including the fixed bar counter. The ceiling is also decorated with period cornicing. In the 50s the Green Salon was used as a restaurant for guests to the Ball House. During 1961 to 1990 the Green Salon was used as the editor’s suite for the recording studios and was connected via cameras to the Meistersaal.

== Importance ==
The Meistersaal is one of the remaining buildings in the Köthener Straße that had survived the Second World War and at the same time (ref History of the Köthener Straße) one of the few remaining concert and dance halls from the golden 20s of Berlin. Although the golden era of the Meistersaal was during the epic times after 1961 when it was used as a recording studio. The scenery, created through the unique atmosphere of the recording studios and through its location in the immediate vicinity of the Berlin Wall, is especially attractive and inspiring to Anglo-American artists. The most famous example is the song "Heroes" by David Bowie that was written and recorded here during the spell he lived in Berlin. The Meistersaal was known across the globe in music circles as "The big hall by the wall" or "the studio by the wall". These days visitors can experience some of the history for themselves by taking part in guided tours through the Meistersaal and the Hansa recording studios.

== Trivia ==
- In April 2009, Swedish band Kent recorded their 8th studio album "Röd" in the Meistersaal.
- In July 2010, American band R.E.M. recorded a part of their album Collapse into Now in the Meistersaal. A set of songs from the album was recorded live at the hall, marking their final performance before the band disbanded in 2011.
- In 2018, Italian band Decibel recorded part of their music video for "Fuori dal tempo" in the Meistersaal.

Also in 2018, the supergroup Hollywood Vampires recorded a Cover of David Bowies Heroes in the Meistersaal and recorded some parts of the music video there too.

- In August 2019, Netflix filmed scenes of an open chess tournament set in a 1960s Cincinnati hotel for The Queen's Gambit in the Meistersaal.
