= Go Go Berlin =

Danish rock band

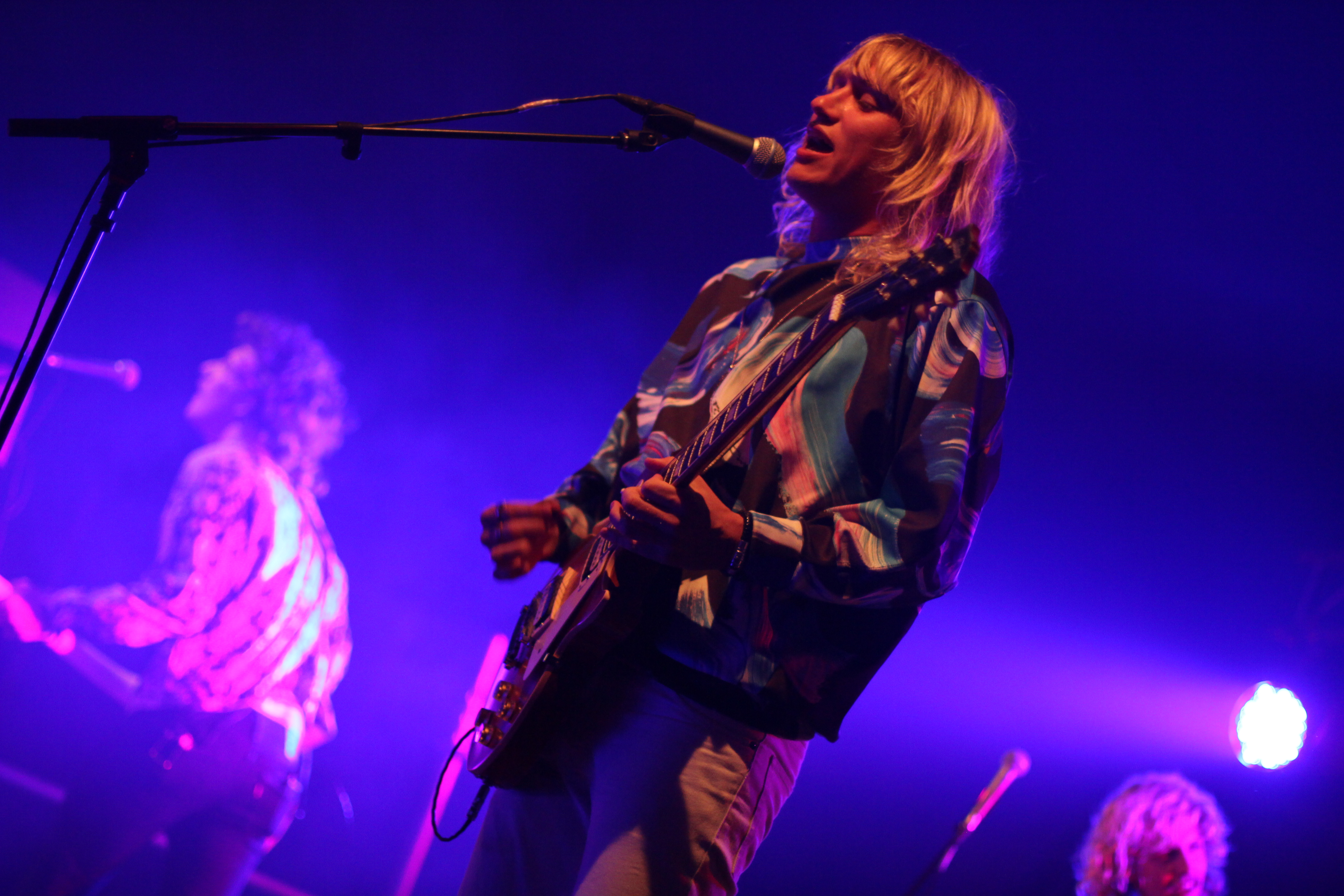

Background information
- Origin: Silkeborg, Denmark
- Genres: Rock, indie rock
- Years active: 2010–present
- Labels: Mermaid / Sony Music
- Members: Christian Vium; Anders Søndergaard; Christoffer Østergaard
- Past members: Mikkel Dyrehave; Emil Rothmann
- Website: www.gogoberlin.com

Go Go Berlin is a Danish rock band established in 2010 in Silkeborg, Denmark and signed with the record label Mermaid and with Sony Music for distribution. The band has released the album New Gold that charted in its first week of release in Tracklisten, the official Danish Albums Chart. Described as one of Denmark's strongest live acts, they appeared at the Roskilde Festival and Skanderborg Festival in 2013. Their second album, Electric Lives, has been recorded in Hansa Tonstudio and released in August 2015.

== Members ==
The band is made up of:

- Christian Vium – lead vocals, guitar
- Anders Søndergaard – organ
- Christoffer Østergaard – drums

Former members:

- Mikkel Dyrehave – guitar
- Emil Rothmann – bass

== Discography ==
=== Albums ===
Year	Album	Peak positions
Year	Album	DEN
2013	New Gold	5
2015	Electric Lives	6
2019	The Ocean	—
2021	Expectations	—
