= Emil Berliner Studios =

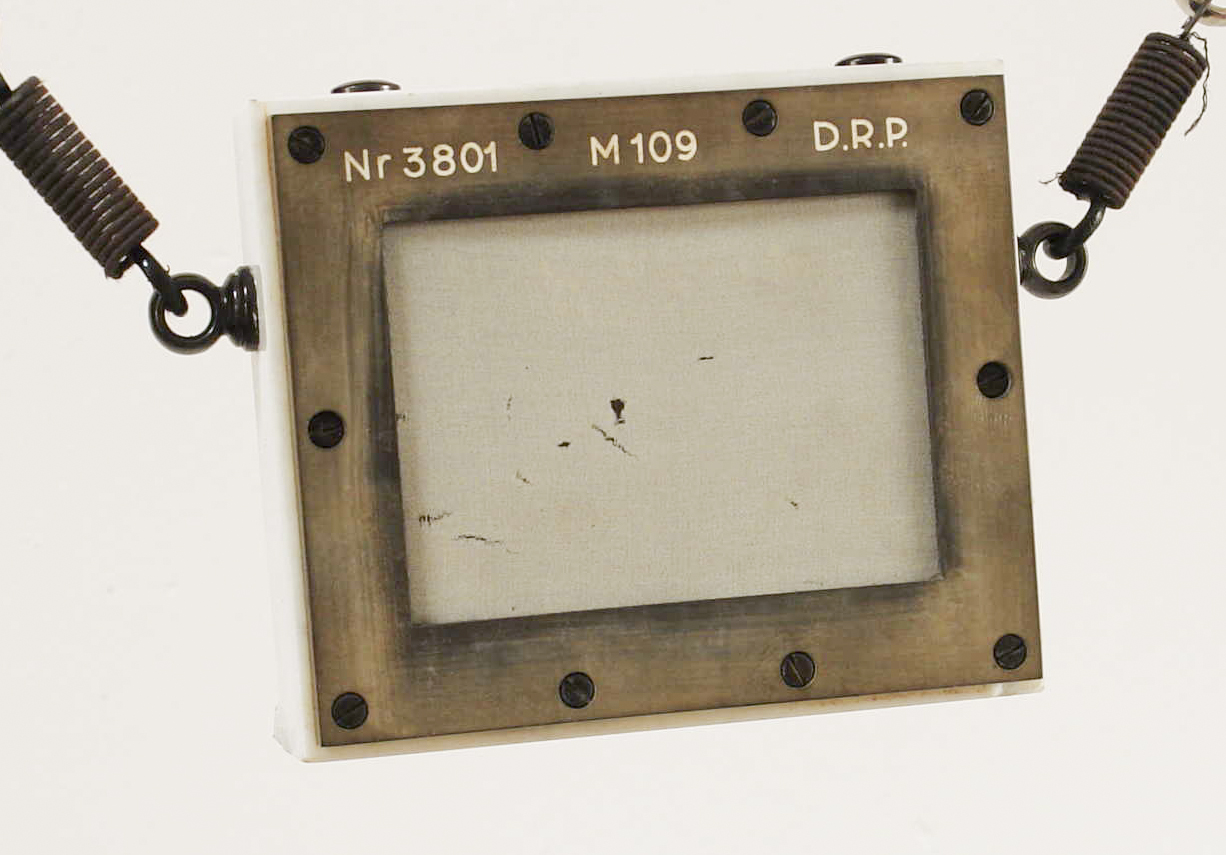
- The Reisz microphone was used from 1925 to 1928 for recordings

General information
- Type: Recording studio
- Location: Markgrafenstraße 76, Berlin, Germany
- Opened: 1900

The Emil Berliner Studios, named after the inventor of the grammophone and the record, is a sound studio in the heart of Berlin. The studio originated from the recording department of Deutsche Grammophon.

== History ==
Deutsche Grammophon, founded by Emil Berliner in 1898, opened its Berlin headquarters (Markgrafenstraße 76) in 1900. It was primarily a recording studio with three recording rooms. Mobile recording technology, however, also allowed recordings to be made worldwide.

1925 saw the arrival of electronic recordings with the Reisz-Kohl microphone, which replaced the previous acoustic horn microphones. Three years later the first condenser microphone was introduced, from General Electric and Neumann. From 1939 the Zentral-Theaters in Alten Jakobstrasse was also used as a recording location. It was here that the first recordings from Herbert von Karajan took place. Other artists included Wilhelm Kempff, Elly Ney, Georg Kulenkampff, Erna Berger and Heinrich Schlusnus.

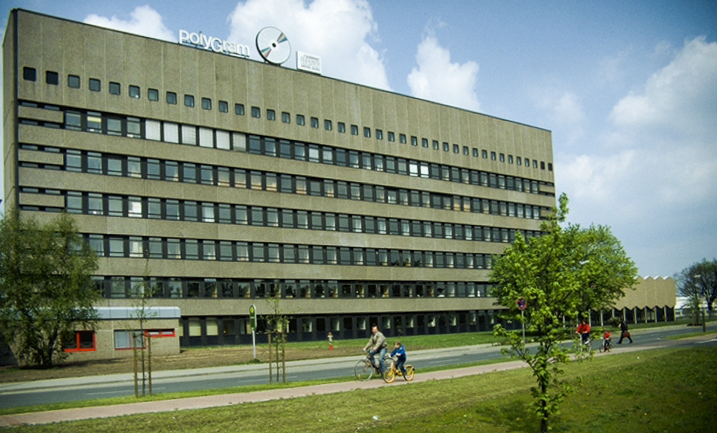
The recording center of Deutsche Grammopon was located on the top three floors from 1978 to 1996

The sound studio in the Alten Jakobstrasse was destroyed in 1945 by an air raid. After the war, the recordings department of Deutsche Grammophon started operating their mobile recording services from Hannover, and set up cutting and mixing studios in the record factory in Podbielskistrasse. In 1946 the first recordings on magnetic tape were made, which then went on to replace the direct to disc recording technique. The first stereo recordings were made in 1950 for Deutsche Grammophon.

In 1969 the studios moved to Hannover-Langenhagen. One year later multitrack technology was introduced. The first quadraphonic recording (4 tracks) took place with mobile equipment in Boston with Michael Tilson Thomas, followed by the first 8 track opera production with Carlos Kleiber in 1973 (Weber: Der Freischütz). In 1976 the studio, together with Eugen Jochum, produced the first 16 track opera production (Wagner: Die Meistersinger von Nürnberg), at the same time the first digital stereo test recording took place with Maurizio Pollini. The first multitrack digital recording took place in 1979 with Herbert von Karajan (Wagner: Parsifal).

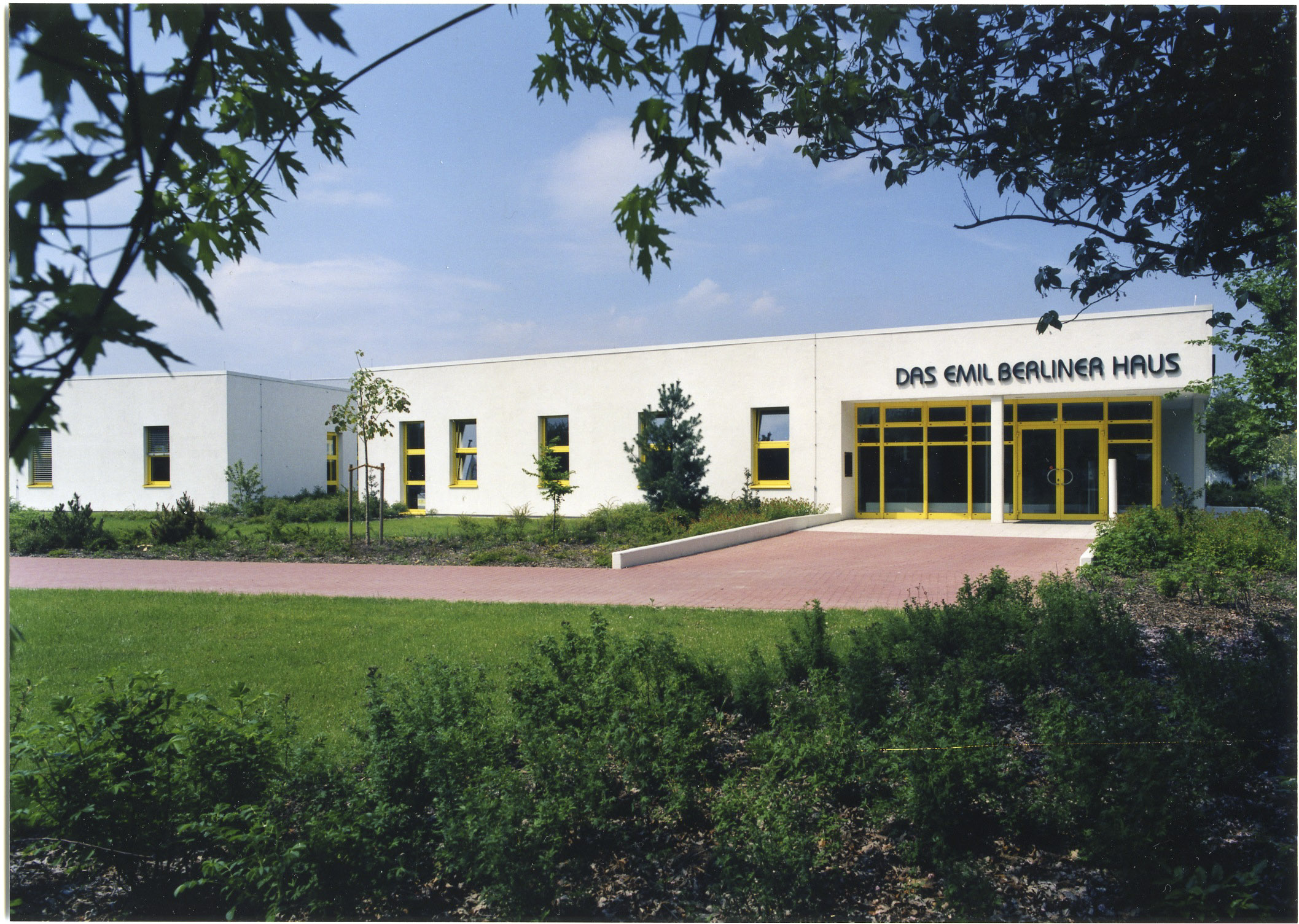
The "Emil Berliner Haus" in Hannover-Langenhagen

1989 saw the first application of digital mixing desks and from 1994 recordings were made on modified multitrack machines with a bit depth of 24 bits. In 1996 the recording center moved into the newly built Emil-Berliner-Haus in Hannover-Langenhagen and in the following year the studios changed their name to "PolyGram Recording Services". The recording studio then expanded with further PolyGram classic labels and third party clients. Following another ownership adjustment, the name was changed to Universal Recording Services in 1999. In 2000 the recording, audio engineering, tape mastering and tape archiving departments were transferred into a new division of Deutsche Grammophon, Emil Berliner Studios GmbH. It was during this period the Emil Berliner Studios developed the ambient surround imaging technique.

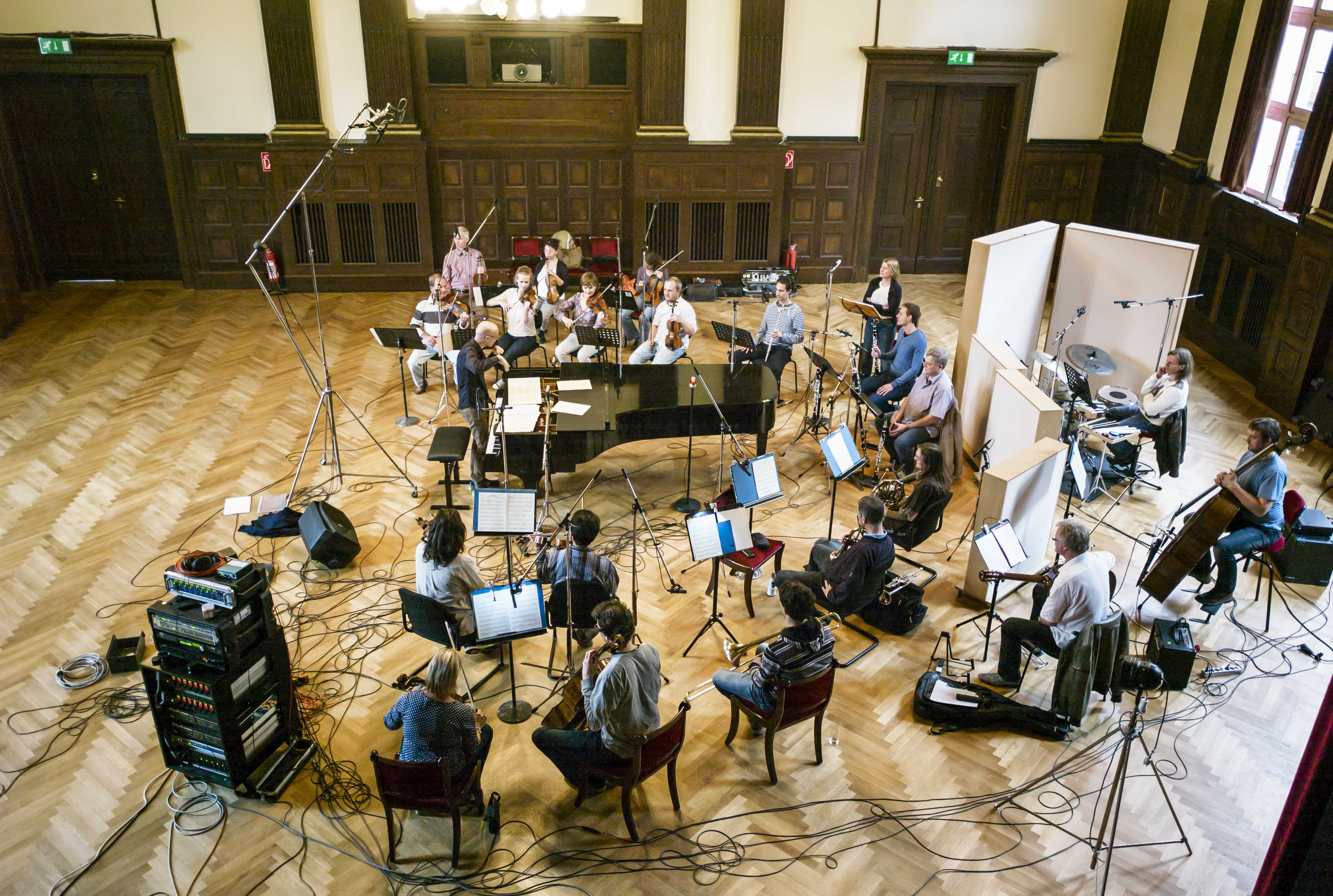
Orchestral recording in the Meistersaal with Emil Berliner Studios

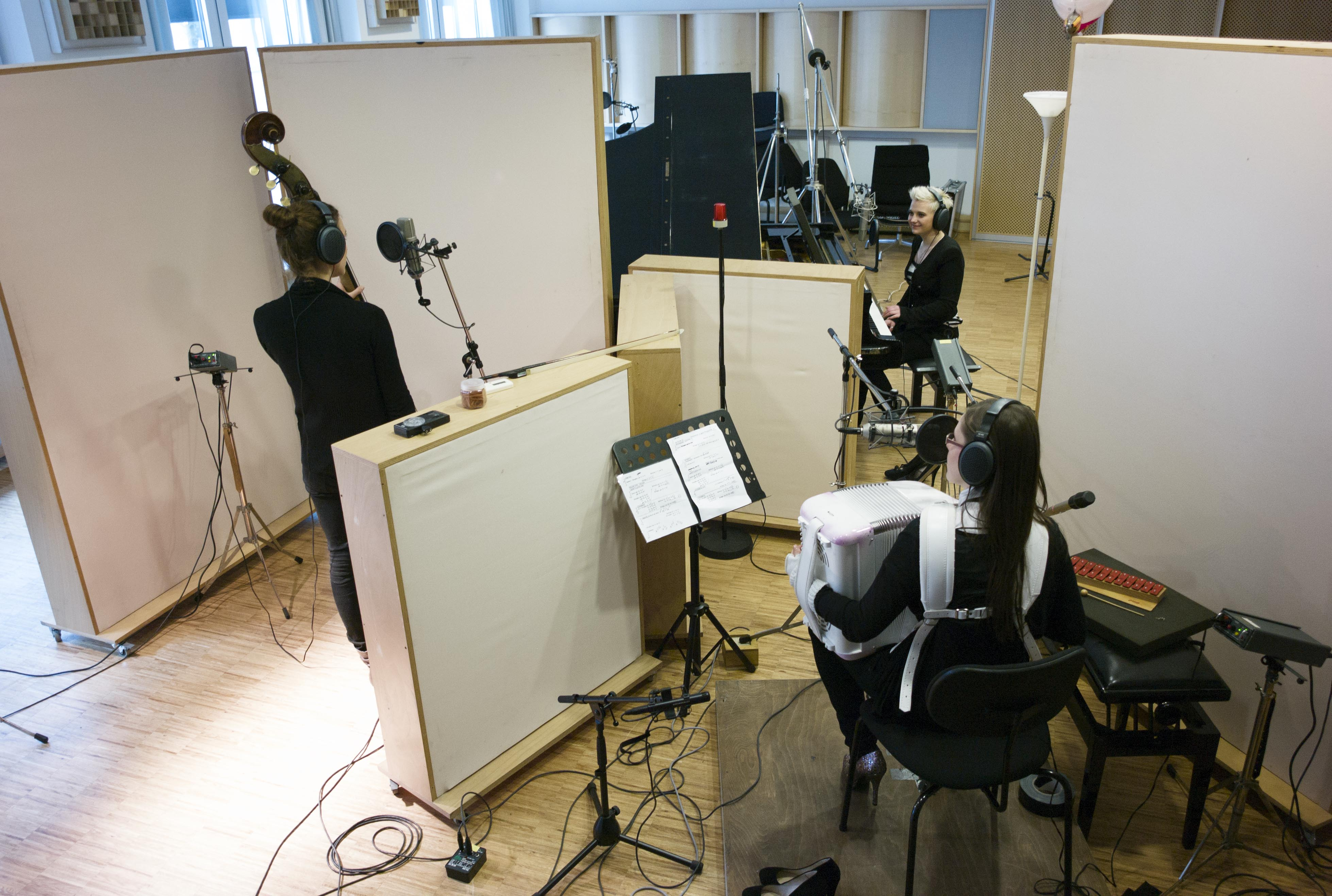
Direct to Disc recording with Elaiza in the Emil Berliner Studios

In May 2008, a management buyout of the recording department resulted in separation from Deutsche Grammophon and the foundation of EBS Productions GmbH & Co. KG. The recordings and studio work now took place under the name of Emil Berliner Studios as an independent studio. In 2010 Emil Berliner Studios moved to Berlin, to their new and current studios in Köthener Strasse 38, the same building as Hansa Studios and the Meistersaal are located. Here in Berlin, artists such as Anna Netrebko, Plácido Domingo, Rolando Villazón, Lang Lang and Anne-Sophie Mutter have been produced.

The new studios have since expanded to recording jazz, rock and film music. One particularly special feature is the reintroduction of pure analogue direct to disc recordings.

== Facilities ==
The Emil Berliner Studios have three digital control rooms covering ca. 450 m^{2}, an analogue suit with a Neumann VMS 80 cutting machine for vinyl cutting, a 100 m^{2} recording room and storage space for the on location mobile recording equipment. All of the control rooms also have digital and analogue connections to the Meistersaal.

== Resources ==
- Lebensbilanz: 80 Jahre Klangaufzeichnung. Interview with Peter K. Burkowitz: Achtung: Aufnahme! Gespräche zur Medienpraxis des 20. Jahrhunderts, Potsdam (Polzer) 2012, 218 S., ISBN 978-3-934535-30-5
- Report from Walter Schindler (worked in the factory for the recording studio of the Deutschen Grammophon 1926 in Berlin, 1949 repositioned to Hannover, 1962 retired), on a MC from 29 September 1976 and interviews on 5 November 1981 and 21 February 1983, consolidated 1982/83 by Ernst Kwoll
- 100 Jahre Schallplatte – Von Hannover in die Welt. Article and catalog for the exhibition from 29 September 1987 to 10th Januar 1988 in the History Museum on Hohen Ufer, Hannover
- DGG publications:
  - 65 Jahre Deutsche Grammophon Gesellschaft, 1898–1963
  - 100 Jahre Schallplatte – von Hannover in die Welt (P. Becker, O. Heyne, U. Lencher, J. Popp, K. Schäfer, P. Schulze, D. Tasch, W. Zahn, F. R. Zankl).
