= Männer (song) =

Single by Herbert Grönemeyer

from the album 4630 Bochum
- B-side: "Amerika"
- Released: 14 June 1984
- Recorded: January 1984
- Genre: Rock, synthpop, new wave
- Length: 4:01 (album version); 3:45 (single edit)
- Label: EMI
- Songwriter: Herbert Grönemeyer
- Producer: Herbert Grönemeyer

Herbert Grönemeyer singles chronology
"Kaufen" (1983)	"Männer" (1984)	"Alkohol" (1984)

"Männer" (German: men) is a 1984 song by German singer Herbert Grönemeyer, released as the first single from the album 4630 Bochum.

The 'Männer' single release is still one of the most successful titles of Grönemeyer. German youth magazine Bravo described the song as "catchy male harassment". German magazine Der Spiegel described the song as "half satire, half eulogy, partly Men's Lib, partly Chauvi Restoration".

== Track listing ==
7" Single EMI 14 6906 7 1984

1. . Männer 3:45
2. . Amerika 3:24

== Charts ==
Chart (1984)	Peak position
German Singles Chart	7
Swiss Singles Chart	27

== Cover versions ==
- 1989: Bläck Fööss
- 1993: Vicky Leandros (Antres)
- 1995: JBO (Frauen)
- 1996: Otto Waalkes (Hexen (Männer))
- 1999: Nina Hagen
- 2000: Manfred Krug
- 2014: TheBossi
