= Dauernd jetzt =

Studio album by Herbert Grönemeyer
- Released: 21 November 2014
- Recorded: 2013–2014
- Studio: Studio La Fabrique, Saint-Rémy-de-Provence; Hansa Tonstudio, Berlin; Mono Music Studio Stockholm; Electric Lady Studios, New York City
- Genre: Rock
- Length: 45:15
- Label: Grönland; Vertigo; Universal
- Producer: Herbert Grönemeyer and Alex Silva

Herbert Grönemeyer chronology
I Walk (2012)	Dauernd jetzt (2014)	Tumult (2018)

Dauernd jetzt (Continuously now) is the 14th full-length album by German singer Herbert Grönemeyer, released in November 2014. It was recorded in Saint-Rémy-de-Provence in France as well as in Berlin, Stockholm, and New York City. It was produced by Alex Silva and Herbert Grönemeyer as all albums have been since Bleibt alles anders in 1998.

The album reached #1 position in the German, Austrian, and Swiss charts as well as #65 in the Netherlands. The lead single was "Morgen", released on 7 November 2014, peaking at #5 in Germany, #8 in Austria, and #12 in Switzerland, followed by "Fang mich an" on 27 February 2015 which peaked at #41 in Germany.

== Track listing ==
No.	Title	English translation	Length
1.	"Morgen"	Tomorrow
2.	"Wunderbare Leere"	Wonderful emptiness
3.	"Uniform"	Uniform
4.	"Fang mich an"	Begin me
5.	"Roter Mond"	Red moon
6.	"Der Löw"	The Löw
7.	"Unter Tage"	Underground
8.	"Verloren"	Lost
9.	"Unser Land"	Our country
10.	"Ich lieb mich durch"	I love myself through
11.	"Einverstanden"	Agree
12.	"Feuerlicht"	Firelight

== Charts ==
=== Weekly charts ===
Chart (2014–2015)	Peak position
Austrian Albums (Ö3 Austria)	1
Dutch Albums (Album Top 100)	65
German Albums (Offizielle Top 100)	1
Swiss Albums (Schweizer Hitparade)	1

=== Year-end charts ===
Chart (2014)	Position
Austrian Albums (Ö3 Austria)	9
German Albums (Offizielle Top 100)	5
Swiss Albums (Schweizer Hitparade)	22

Chart (2015)	Position
Austrian Albums (Ö3 Austria)	62
German Albums (Offizielle Top 100)	16
Swiss Albums (Schweizer Hitparade)	27

== Certifications ==
Region	Certification	Certified units/sales
Austria (IFPI Austria)	2× Platinum	40,000^{*}
Germany (BVMI)	5× Gold	500,000^{^}
Switzerland (IFPI Switzerland)	Platinum	30,000^{^}
^{*} Sales figures based on certification alone.^{^} Shipments figures based on certification alone.
