= Mensch (album) =

Studio album by Herbert Grönemeyer
- Released: 30 August 2002
- Studio: Abbey Road (London); Mayfair (London); RAK (London)
- Genre: German rock; pop rock
- Length: 48:32
- Label: Grönland; EMI
- Producer: Alex Silva, Herbert Grönemeyer

Herbert Grönemeyer chronology
Stand der Dinge (2000)	Mensch (2002)	12 (2007)

Mensch, released in August 2002, is the 20th studio album by German rock/pop artist Herbert Grönemeyer. Mensch ("Human") is Grönemeyer's 11th full-length album of original compositions. It is the most successful German-language album to date.

== Background ==
The title track "Mensch" became Grönemeyer's first number-one single in Germany. The mood of the album reflects the then recent death of his wife, Anna Henkel, and Wilhelm, one of his older brothers, both of cancer, within a week, and is rich with poetic imagery. The songs range from rock to ballads. The richness of the imagery and language, as well as the use of creative word play, can make the lyrics difficult to understand and interpret by listeners who are not fluent in German. In Mensch Grönemeyer reflects on his own humanity as it relates to feeling loss. The song "Der Weg" in particular focuses on memories of his wife and the love they shared, while the song "Unbewohnt" is dealing with the loneliness and depression he felt after his wife's death.

The full-length album was released in three versions:

- a copy-protected CD
- a 12" vinyl LP album
- a hybrid Super Audio CD, containing standard compact disc stereo, Super Audio CD high-resolution stereo, and Super Audio CD high-resolution multi-channel audio content.

The compact disc and the Super Audio CD (CD layer and high-resolution SACD stereo sections) contain a hidden track after about fifteen minutes of silence at the end of the last song. The album is entirely in German.

Mensch was a huge success in Germany, Austria and Switzerland and sold nearly 4 million copies, making it the best-selling German-language record of all time, also being certified with 21 x Gold in Germany.

== Track listing ==
All lyrics are written by Herbert Grönemeyer; all music is composed by Herbert Grönemeyer, except for "Viertel Vor" by Grönemeyer and Alex Silva.

No.	Title	Length
1.	"Mensch"	4:28
2.	"Neuland"	3:42
3.	"Der Weg"	4:18
4.	"Viertel Vor"	4:23
5.	"Lache, wenn es nicht zum Weinen reicht"	4:42
6.	"Unbewohnt"	5:04
7.	"Dort und hier"	2:32
8.	"Blick zurück"	5:54
9.	"Kein Pokal"	4:33
10.	"Zum Meer"	5:38
11.	"Demo (Letzter Tag)" (Contains hidden track after minutes of silence)	3:27

== Charts and certifications ==
=== Chart positions ===
Professional ratings
Review scores
Source	Rating
AllMusic	4/5 stars
Laut.de	4/5 stars
Rolling Stone	4/5 stars

Charts (2002)	Peak position	Year-end (2002)	Year-end (2003)	Year-end (2004)	Decade-end (2000–09)	All-time
Austria (Ö3 Austria Top 40)	1	2	3	69	6	20
Germany (Media Control Charts)	1	1	3	—	—	1
Netherlands (MegaCharts)	38	—	—	—	—	—
Switzerland (Schweizer Hitparade)	1	4	47	—	—	120

=== Certifications ===
Region	Certification	Certified units/sales
Austria (IFPI Austria)	8× Platinum	240,000^{*}
Germany (BVMI)	21× Gold	3,150,000^{^}
Switzerland (IFPI Switzerland)	5× Platinum	200,000^{^}
Summaries
Europe (IFPI)	3× Platinum	3,000,000^{*}
^{*} Sales figures based on certification alone.^{^} Shipments figures based on certification alone.

=== Singles ===
Year	Title	Chart positions			Certifications
Year	Title	AT	CH	DE	Certifications
2002	"Mensch"	1	2	1	BVMI: Platinum; IFPI CH: Gold
2002	"Der Weg"	14	35	12	
2003	"Demo (Letzter Tag)"	53	—	36	
2003	"Zum Meer"	—	—	81	

== See also ==
- List of best-selling albums in Germany
