= 4630 Bochum =

Studio album by Herbert Grönemeyer
- Released: 11 May 1984
- Studio: EMI Tonstudio II
- Genre: Rock, pop
- Length: 38:43
- Label: EMI
- Producer: Herbert Grönemeyer; co-produced by Gaggy Mrotzek and Norbert Hamm

Herbert Grönemeyer chronology
Gemischte Gefühle (1983)	4630 Bochum (1984)	Sprünge (1986)

Singles from 4630 Bochum
- 1. "Männer" Released: 4 June 1984; 2. "Alkohol" Released: 8 October 1984; 3. "Flugzeuge im Bauch" Released: 4 February 1985

4630 Bochum is the fifth studio album by German rock/pop singer Herbert Grönemeyer. It was released on 11 May 1984 on vinyl and on 14 August 1984 on CD by EMI.

== Recording ==
4630 Bochum was recorded between January and March 1984 in EMI studios in Cologne. It was his first album for EMI after the end of his contract with Intercord Tonträger GmbH (a record label owned by Verlagsgruppe Georg von Holtzbrinck).

The album spent 79 weeks in the German albums chart, making it the most successful album of 1984 in Germany. With certified sales in excess of 2.5 million, it is currently the third-best-selling album in Germany, having been certified quintuple platinum. In Switzerland and Austria, the album spent 13 and 24 weeks respectively in the charts. The single release "Männer" in particular established Grönemeyer's fame in Germany.

The cover shows the title hand-written in the style of an address in white chalk on a black background:

Herbert
Grönemeyer
4630 Bochum

At the time, 4630 was the postal code for the city of Bochum where Grönemeyer grew up and had worked as a musician.

== Track listing ==
1. "Bochum" – 3:50
2. "Männer" – 4:00
3. "Flugzeuge im Bauch" – 3:54
4. "Alkohol" – 4:29
5. "Amerika" – 3:26
6. "Für Dich da" – 3:23
7. "Jetzt oder nie" – 4:57
8. "Fangfragen" – 4:17
9. "Erwischt" – 4:01
10. "Mambo" – 2:45

== Personnel ==
- Herbert Grönemeyer – vocals, choir, piano
- Detlef Kessler – drums
- Alfred Kritzer – piano, trumpet
- Norbert Hamm – bass
- Jakob Hansonis – guitars
- Gaggy Mrozeck – guitars
- Charlie Mariano – saxophone

== Cover versions ==
- Männer a-cappella by Bläck Fööss in 1989
- Männer, titled Frauen by JBO in 1995
- Flugzeuge im Bauch by Oli.P and Xavier Naidoo (DE No. 1, AT No. 1, CH #1) in 1998
- Mambo, titled Mamboleo by Loona in 1999
- Flugzeuge im Bauch by Katja Friedenberg on The Voice of Germany (DE #41) in 2012

== Charts ==
=== Weekly charts ===
Weekly chart performance for 4630 Bochum
Chart (1984–2003)	Peak position
Austrian Albums (Ö3 Austria)	7
German Albums (Offizielle Top 100)	1
Swiss Albums (Schweizer Hitparade)	12

=== Year-end charts ===
1984 year-end chart performance for 4630 Bochum
Chart (1984)	Position
German Albums (Offizielle Top 100)	1

== Certifications ==
Sales certifications for 4630 Bochum
Region	Certification	Certified units/sales
Austria (IFPI Austria)	2× Platinum	100,000^{*}
Germany (BVMI)	11× Gold	2,750,000^{^}
Switzerland (IFPI Switzerland)	Platinum	50,000^{^}
^{*} Sales figures based on certification alone.^{^} Shipments figures based on certification alone.
