= Schiffsverkehr =

Studio album by Herbert Grönemeyer
- Released: 18 March 2011
- Recorded: 2010 – February 2011
- Studio: Hansa Tonstudio, Berlin; Mono Music Studio, Stockholm; Electric Lady Studios, New York City; Abbey Road Studios, London
- Genre: Rock
- Length: 57:02
- Label: Grönland; EMI
- Producer: Herbert Grönemeyer and Alex Silva

Herbert Grönemeyer chronology
12 (2007)	Schiffsverkehr (2011)	I Walk (2012)

Schiffsverkehr is the 13th full-length album by German singer Herbert Grönemeyer, released in March 2011. It was recorded in Berlin, Stockholm, London and New York City and was produced by Alex Silva and Herbert Grönemeyer, like the previous album 12. and every album since Bleibt alles anders in 1998.

The album reached the top spot in the German, Austrian, and Swiss charts, as well as #34 in the Netherlands. The title track also became the lead single; it peaked at #10 in Germany, #33 in Austria and #45 in Switzerland.

== Track listing ==
No.	Title	English translation	Length
1.	"Schiffsverkehr"	Ship traffic
2.	"Kreuz meinen Weg"	Cross my path
3.	"Fernweh"	Wanderlust
4.	"Unfassbarer Grund"	Incomprehensible reason
5.	"Deine Zeit"	Your time
6.	"Erzähl mir von morgen"	Tell me about tomorrow
7.	"Auf dem Feld"	In the field
8.	"Zu Dir"	To you
9.	"Wäre ich einfach nur feige"	If I only were cowardly
10.	"Lass es uns nicht regnen"	Don't let it rain on us
11.	"So wie ich"	Like myself
12.	"November (hidden track)"	November

== Charts ==
=== Weekly charts ===
Chart (2011)	Peak position
Austrian Albums (Ö3 Austria)	1
Dutch Albums (Album Top 100)	34
German Albums (Offizielle Top 100)	1
Swiss Albums (Schweizer Hitparade)	1

=== Year-end charts ===
Chart (2011)	Position
Austrian Albums (Ö3 Austria)	9
German Albums (Offizielle Top 100)	3
Swiss Albums (Schweizer Hitparade)	17
