= 12 (Herbert Grönemeyer album) =

Studio album by Herbert Grönemeyer
- Released: March 2007
- Genre: Pop rock
- Length: 48:48
- Label: Grönland; EMI
- Producer: Herbert Grönemeyer and Alex Silva

Herbert Grönemeyer chronology
Mensch (2002)	12 (2007)	Schiffsverkehr (2011)

12 is the twelfth full-length album by German singer Herbert Grönemeyer, released in March 2007. It was recorded between 2006 and 2007 in London and was produced by Alex Silva and Herbert Grönemeyer. All songs were written by Grönemeyer, except the song "Spur" to which Arezu Weitholz contributed parts of the lyrics.

The album reached the number one position in the German charts. The first single "Stück vom Himmel", became Grönemeyer's third number-one single in Germany after "Mensch" and "Zeit, dass sich was dreht".

== Track listing ==
No.	Title	English translation	Length
1.	"Stück vom Himmel"	Piece of heaven
2.	"Kopf hoch, tanzen"	Heads up, dance
3.	"Du bist die"	You are the one
4.	"Marlene"	Marlene
5.	"Flüsternde Zeit"	Whispering time
6.	"Leb in meiner Welt"	Live in my world
7.	"Ich versteh"	I understand
8.	"Ohne dich"	Without you
9.	"Spur"	Track
10.	"Zieh deinen Weg"	Draw your way
11.	"Zur Nacht"	To the night
12.	"Liebe liegt nicht"	Love is not (literally: Love does not lie)

== Charts ==
=== Weekly charts ===
Chart (2007)	Peak position
Austrian Albums (Ö3 Austria)	1
Dutch Albums (Album Top 100)	64
German Albums (Offizielle Top 100)	1
Swiss Albums (Schweizer Hitparade)	1

=== Year-end charts ===
Chart (2007)	Position
Austrian Albums (Ö3 Austria)	4
German Albums (Offizielle Top 100)	2
Swiss Albums (Schweizer Hitparade)	11

Chart (2008)	Position
German Albums (Offizielle Top 100)	46

== Certifications ==
1. Germany – 4× Platinum (800,000 copies)
2. Austria – 3× Platinum (90,000 copies)
3. Switzerland – 3× Platinum (90,000 copies)
4. Europe – Platinum (1,000,000 copies)
