= Herbert Grönemeyer =

German singer, musician and actor (born 1956)

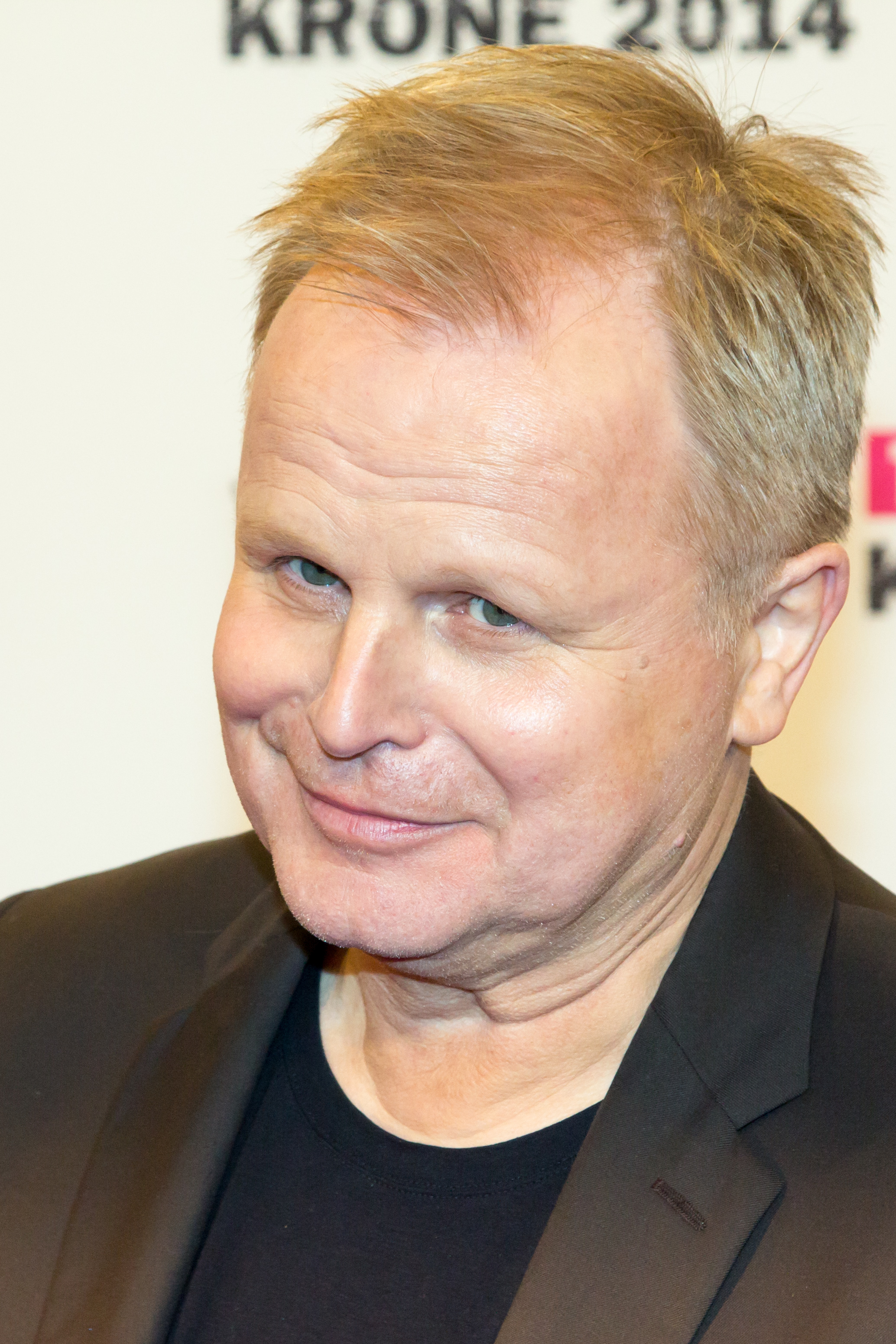
- Grönemeyer in 2014

Background information
- Born: Herbert Arthur Wiglev Clamor Grönemeyer; 12 April 1956 (age 70); Göttingen, West Germany
- Origin: Bochum, Germany
- Genres: Rock, pop rock, soft rock
- Occupations: Singer, musician, producer, composer, actor
- Instruments: Vocals, piano, guitar
- Years active: 1978–present
- Labels: EMI, Grönland
- Website: groenemeyer.de

Herbert Arthur Wiglev Clamor Grönemeyer (born 12 April 1956) is a German singer, musician, producer, composer and actor, popular in Germany, Austria and Switzerland.

Grönemeyer starred as war correspondent Lieutenant Werner in Wolfgang Petersen's 1981 film Das Boot, but later focused on his musical career. His fifth album 4630 Bochum (1984) and his 11th album Mensch (2002) are the fifth- and second-best-selling records in Germany respectively, making Grönemeyer the most successful artist in Germany with combined album sales over 13 million.

== Early life ==
Grönemeyer was born on 12 April 1956 in Göttingen. He often refers to his personal roots as living in Bochum though, where he spent most of his childhood, youth and early adulthood. The medical professor Dietrich Grönemeyer is his brother. Grönemeyer's interest in music was sparked at the age of 8, when he started to take piano lessons.

== Career ==
Piano classes formed the basis for his work as a pianist and composer at the local theatre Schauspielhaus Bochum. In 1979, at the City of Cologne Theatre (Schauspielhaus Köln), he performed as Lorenzo in The Merchant of Venice. Although never having attended an acting school he soon appeared in several TV productions. During one of the shootings he met his later wife, the actress Anna Henkel. Additionally, Grönemeyer published an album he had recorded with the jazz formation Ocean Orchestra in 1978, a year in which he also composed the music for the film Uns reicht das nicht by Jürgen Flimm, together with Jens-Peter Ostendorf. His first solo album Grönemeyer, which was published in 1979, was awarded the Golden Lemon for the ugliest album cover of the year. His second album Zwo was released in 1981. Neither managed to chart. In the same year he starred in Wolfgang Petersen's successful movie Das Boot as Lieutenant Werner. For the role of composer Robert Schumann in the German-German coproduction Spring Symphony (co-starring Nastassja Kinski and Rolf Hoppe), for which he also composed the film score, Grönemeyer spent six months in East Germany. During the early 1980s Grönemeyer put his main focus on his music; the next two albums Total egal (1982) and Gemischte Gefühle (1983) flopped and most concerts of the planned tour had to be cancelled.

In 1984, Grönemeyer first met success as a musician with the release of 4630 Bochum which became the best-selling album in Germany that year, particularly supported by the singles "Männer" and "Flugzeuge im Bauch". A year later Grönemeyer appeared in the TV-movie Väter und Söhne, co-starring Julie Christie, Burt Lancaster and Bruno Ganz. Grönemeyer took part in Germany's first major AIDS charity organized by the famous gay rights activist Rosa von Praunheim. In his next albums Sprünge (1986), he increasingly expressed his political opinion, criticising the government under German Chancellor Helmut Kohl. In 1986, Grönemeyer performed at the Anti-WAAhnsinns Festival against nuclear power and he composed the film score for the TV film Sommer in Lesmona, for which he received the Adolf Grimme Award in gold. Grönemeyer's next album Ö (1988) saw also the release of an English version, titled What's all this, followed by a tour through Canada, where it had success in the charts. After the Berlin Wall had fallen Grönemeyer released the album Luxus in which he addressed the feelings in East and West Germany.

More than 600,000 people saw the following tour. In 1994, Grönemeyer was the first non-English-speaking artist who was invited by MTV to do an unplugged concert. Four years later, Grönemeyer moved to London and released Bleibt alles anders (Everything Remains Different). He also founded his own record label, Grönland Records. In the same year, his brother Wilhelm and his wife Anna died of cancer (both dying within four days of each other); it took Grönemeyer a year to resume his work. In 2000, he recorded a concert with a philharmonic orchestra and released the DVD Stand der Dinge (State of Affairs).

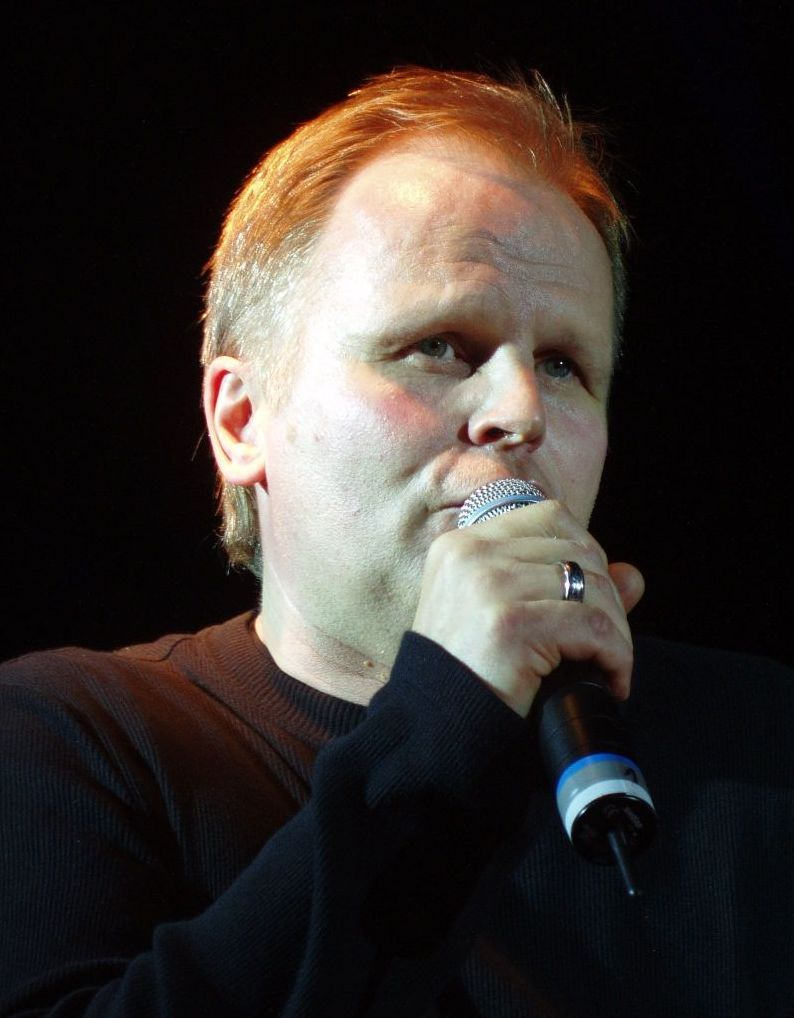
Grönemeyer performing in 2004

In August 2002, he released his album Mensch (Human) which was awarded Platinum even before release due to advance orders. The single "Mensch" became Grönemeyer's first number one hit in Germany and 1.5 million people saw the 2-year tour. In 2004 and 2006 Grönemeyer recorded songs for the Olympic Games in Athens ("Everlasting") and the 2006 FIFA World Cup in Germany ("Celebrate the Day"), respectively.

In March 2007, he released his 12th studio album 12 which was followed by a stadium tour across German-speaking countries. Smaller concerts took place in September in Amsterdam, Munich, Dresden, and London's Royal Albert Hall.

The three re-recorded albums What's all this, Luxus and Chaos for the English-speaking market were met with limited sales success. Grönemeyer was scheduled to make his American debut on 17 September 2007 at the Beacon Theatre in New York City, but the performance was cancelled.

In January 2010, Grönemeyer performed the anthem "Komm zur Ruhr" as part of the opening ceremony of the "RUHR.2010" – The city of Essen being the "European Capital of Culture 2010" on behalf of the entire Ruhr area.

In March 2011, Grönemeyer released his next studio album Schiffsverkehr, which became a number-one-album in Germany, Austria and Switzerland. The following 2011 tour of the same name had an audience of 550,000.

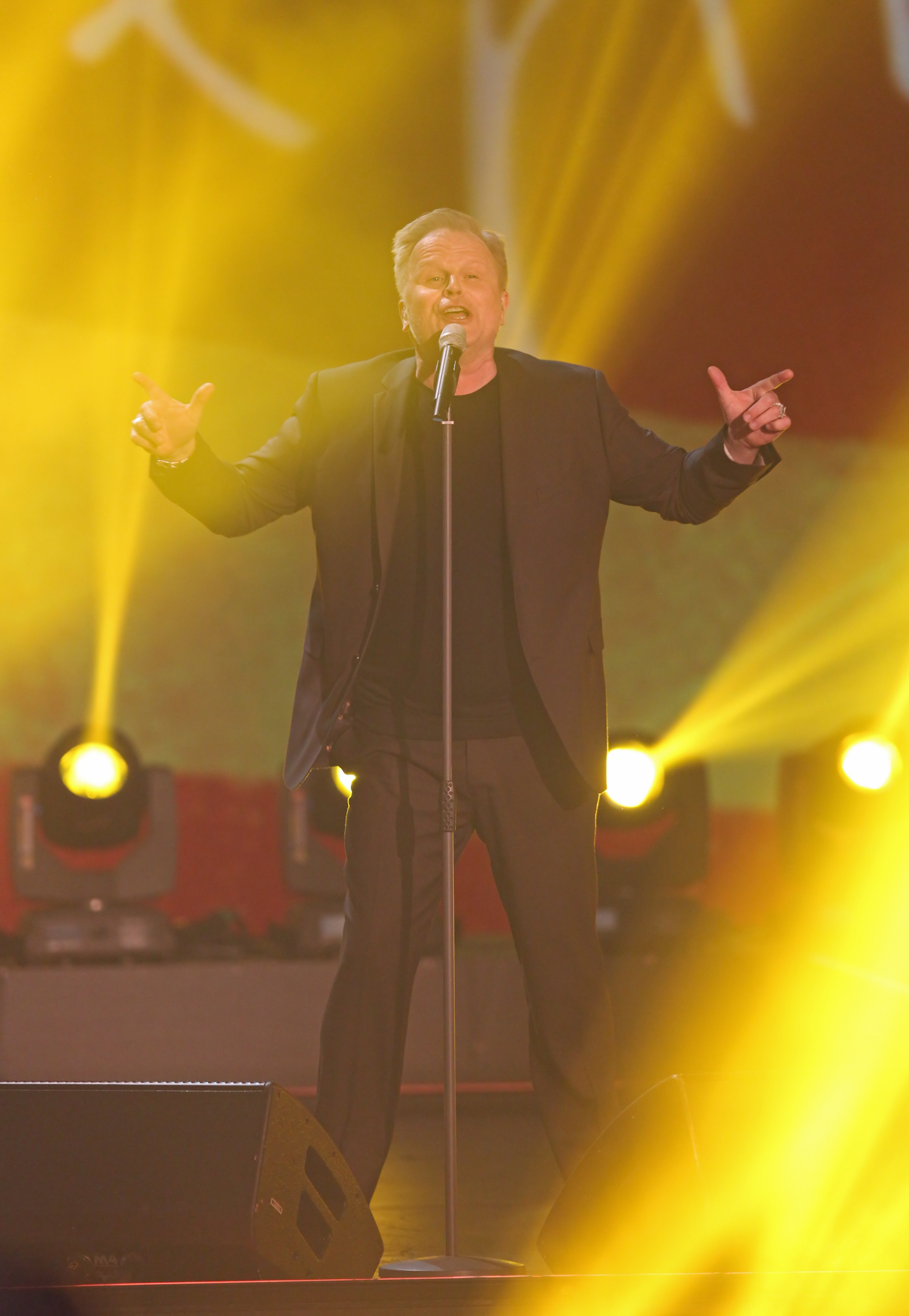
Grönemeyer on stage in 2014

I Walk, the English-language debut in the U.S. for Grönemeyer, was released in February 2013 on Grönland Deutschland/EMI Label Services. In early 2013, he played his first American concerts at the Chicago Theatre on 23 February and New York's Irving Plaza on 26 February. His U.S. website later announced 12 tour dates in the U.S. and Canada for September 2013. The album, which includes guest performances from Bono of U2, Anohni Hegarty of Anohni and The Johnsons, and guitarist James Dean Bradfield of the Manic Street Preachers, was released in the UK in October 2012.

The magazine TIME awarded him the title of "European Hero" in 2005 for his humanitarian work.

Grönemeyer's 2014 album Dauernd jetzt won the Goldene Kamera award for the best German language album of 2014 and 2015, while Grönemeyer himself received the Best National Music award. In March 2015, Grönemeyer also won an Echo award with this album.

On 25 November 2016, his new Album Live aus Bochum was released. The album contains live recordings of the concerts Grönemeyer gave in Bochum's Ruhrstadion in July 2015.

== Discography ==
=== Studio albums ===
- Grönemeyer (1979)
- Zwo ("Two") (1980)
- Total egal ("Totally Doesn't Matter") (1982)
- Gemischte Gefühle ("Mixed Feelings") (1983)
- 4630 Bochum (1984)
- Sprünge ("Leaps") (1986)
- Ö (1988)
- Luxus ("Luxury") (1990)
- Chaos (1993)
- Bleibt alles anders ("Everything Stays Different") (1998)
- Mensch ("Human") (2002)
- 12 (2007)
- Schiffsverkehr ("Ship Traffic") (2011)
- Dauernd jetzt ("Constantly Now") (2014)
- Tumult ("Commotion") (2018)
- Das ist los ("Something's Up") (2023)

== Filmography ==
- 1976: Die Geisel (TV play, based on The Hostage, directed by Peter Zadek) as Volunteer
- 1978: Von Tag zu Tag (directed by Ulrich Stein)
- 1979: Uns reicht das nicht (directed by Jürgen Flimm) as Gerd
- 1979: Zuhaus unter Fremden (directed by Peter Keglevic) as Bernd
- 1980: Mosch as Erster Kabarettist
- 1981: Das Boot (directed by Wolfgang Petersen) as Lt. Werner
- 1982: Doctor Faustus (directed by Franz Seitz) as Deutschlin (cameo)
- 1983: Spring Symphony (directed by Peter Schamoni) as Robert Schumann
- 1984: Die ewigen Gefühle (directed by Peter Beauvais) as Heinrich Anderer
- 1985: Väter und Söhne – Eine deutsche Tragödie (directed by Bernhard Sinkel) as Georg Deutz
- 2007: Control (directed by Anton Corbijn) as Local GP (cameo)
- 2008: 8 as himself
- 2010: The American (directed by Anton Corbijn, film score by Herbert Grönemeyer)
- 2014: A Most Wanted Man (directed by Anton Corbijn, film score by Herbert Grönemeyer) as Michael Axelrod
