= German electronic music =

Musical genre

German electronic music is a broad musical genre encompassing specific styles such as electroclash, trance, krautrock and schranz. It is widely considered to have emerged in the late 1960s and early 1970s, becoming increasingly popular in subsequent decades. Originally minimalistic style of electronic music developed into psychedelic and prog rock aspects, techno and electronic dance music. Notable artists include Kraftwerk, Can, Tangerine Dream and Deutsch Amerikanische Freundschaft. German electronic music contributed to a global transition of electronic music from underground art to an international phenomenon, with festivals such as Love Parade, Winterworld and MayDay gaining prominence alongside raves and clubs.

== Characteristics ==
=== Musical elements ===
Electronic music is itself a broad term, characterised only by the specific use of electronic or digital musical instruments. German electronic music hence lacks distinctive musical characteristics other than varying usage of circuitry-based technology. Generally, polyphonic synthesisers, electronic drums, turntables and drum machines were frequent. The musical elements of German electronic music are very specific to the style and artist. Krautrock, a genre of electronic rock, involved experimental mixes of psychedelic and progressive rock with ambient music, electronic sounds, minimalist avant-garde musique concrete and jazz. Kraftwerk, a famous German electronic band, utilised metronomic melodies, while Faust, another musical group, maintained minimalism by using one or two chords or riffs played at high volumes. In contrast, electroclash fused musical elements of electro, techno, new wave, punk, synth-pop and performance art to form their sounds.

=== Local scenes ===
Clubs in Berlin are allowed to stay 24 hours a day, as a legacy of competition between the Allied sectors and Russian-controlled East Berlin in the late 1940s. German electronic music was characterised originally by illegal underground scenes of raves and parties. Immediately following the fall of the Berlin Wall, industrial ruins and unconventional venues became unregulated centres of raw techno music. Taking DJs from Detroit techno and Chicago acid house while emulating the free-spirited party cultures of Ibiza and Manchester's Hacienda Club, German electronic music was characterised by a culture of youth, nightlife and freedom. As German electronic music developed, it maintained this intrinsic characteristic, developing techno and electronic dance music into international phenomenon, with festivals such as Love Parade, Winterworld and MayDay gaining prominence.

== History ==
=== Origins ===
The foundations for electronic music were formed from 1948 to 1953. German, French and American figures, including Ferruccio Busoni, Arnold Schoenberg, Edgard Varèse and John Cage, formulated new compositional procedures utilising developments in science. Electronic music was driven by composers striving to directly manipulate sound; experimenting with electronic circuitry, amplifiers and loudspeakers. Post-WW2 electronic music began developing rapidly, starting in Cologne 1952–53. Karel Goeyvaerts and Karlheinz Stockhausen experimented with the earliest sound-compositions using sine tones. Drawing from the tape music of Vladimir Ussachevsky and Otto Luening and first sound experiments by Werner Meyer-Eppler, Stockhausen's Studie I was the first composition to use synthetic sounds from sine tones. In May 1953, Stockhausen, Herbert Eimert and Robert Beyer showcased the first compositions of electronic music at the Cologne International Festival of Contemporary Music. They utilised a melochord, trautonium, ring modulators, octave and radio filters and tape recorders. In 1955, Eimert and Stockhausen edited the first volume, Elektronische Musique, and articles on electronic music, Texte I and II. Throughout the 1950s, tape music primarily utilised, but this quickly developed into electronic amplification instead of magnetic recordings by the 1960s.

=== Late 1960s, 1970s ===
From 1967 to 1976, German artists experimented and drove the frontier of electronic music. Despite being isolated and largely working independently, they were driven by a common principle of seceding away from American and British rock, pop, and soul archetypes as well as embracing absolute political and emotional self-expression through electronically manipulated sounds. Amon Düül, Tangerine Dream and Guru Guru were three pivotal German bands at the avant-garde of electronic music. Amon Düül's albums, including Psychedelic Underground (1969), Collapsing Singvögel Rückwärts & Co (1969), Phallus Dei (1969), Yeti (1970) and Tanz Der Lemminge (1971), showcased anarchic fusions of rock with psychedelic, electronic and even folk sounds. Tangerine Dream's experimentation with trance electronic music formulated their famous 'classic' synth-trio phase with their 1974 album Phaedra. NEU!'s fusion of rock and electronica with repetitive motoric beats and Harmonias seemingly randomly-generated amalgamation of guitar, electronic and synth-pop emerged in the early 1970s.

Arguably most significantly however was the prominence of Kraftwerk electronic group. Following the use of Echoplex flute eddies and primitive electronica in their albums, Kraftwerk (1970), Kraftwerk 2 (1972) and Ralf und Florian (1973), their 1974 hit, "Autobahn", drove German electronic music to worldwide prominence, reaching the Top 30 in the US and Top 10 in Britain. Similarly, Can, originating from Cologne in 1968, derived rhythmic bases similarly to James Brown's funk and strange electronic mixing to drive post-rock electronic musicality.

=== 1980s, 1990s ===
Throughout the 1980s, German electronic music evolved into techno, drawing from Detroit, Chicago and Frankfurt influences. In the mid-1980s as Gorbachev, leader of USSR, implemented open-minded policies of perestroika and glasnost, East Berlin churches began to be used as alternative venues for concerts. For example, West German punk band, Die Toten Hosen, performed illegally in 1983 and 1988 in East Berlin churches. In July 1989 the first Love Parade festival was held, a celebration of electronic music. With the fall of the Berlin Wall in November 1989, illegal parties of techno and dance music thrived in abandoned areas along where the wall had been. This quickly transformed Berlin into a techno capital where budding and prominent DJs, artists and youth congregated from Germany and internationally, cementing nightlife culture of raves and dance.

=== 21st century ===
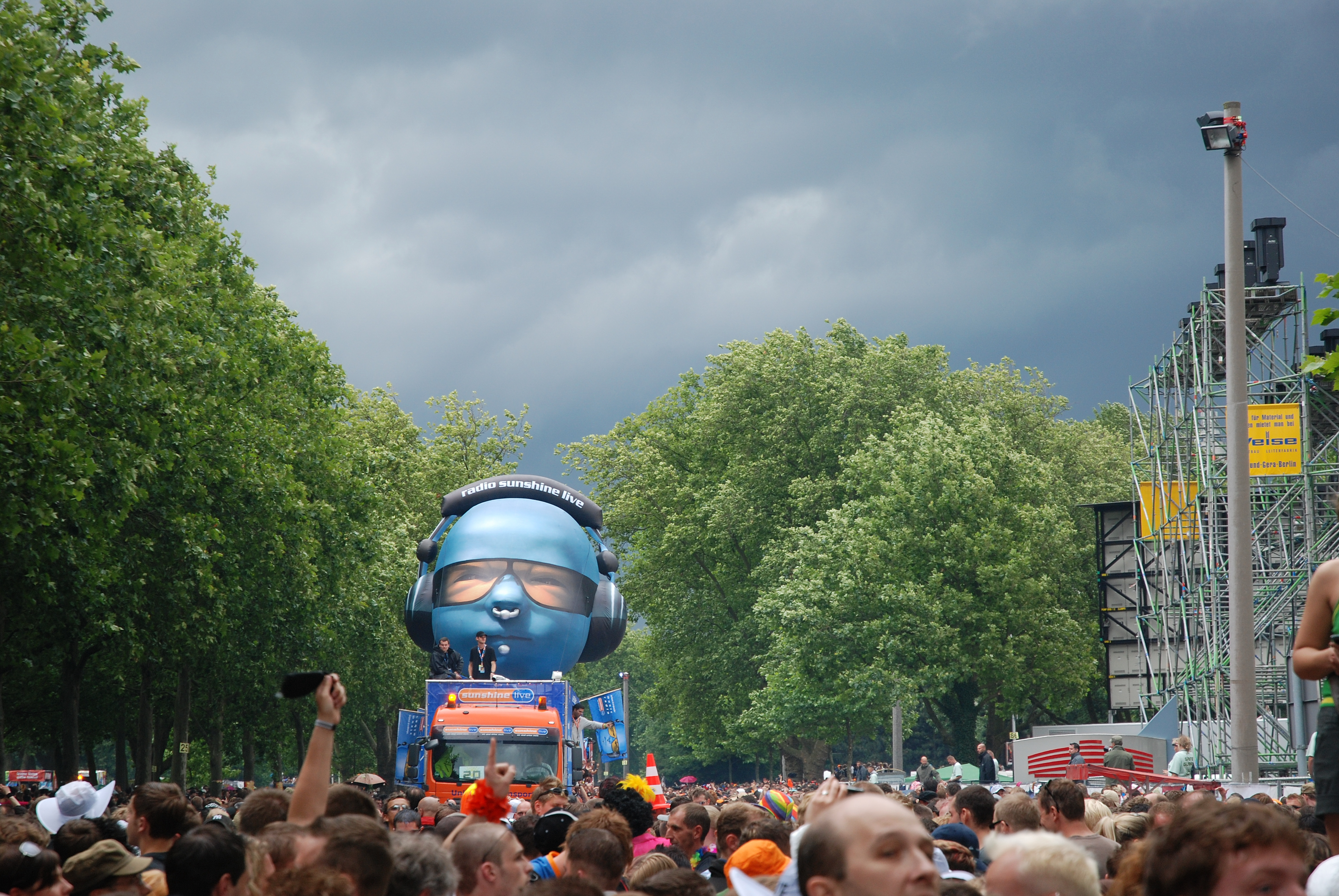
Love Parade in Dortmund, 2008

With the onset of globalisation, German, French and American musical influences contributed into developing a world-wide popularity for EDM, a broad term covering musical genres stemming from electroclash to techno. Germany's electronic music contributed to this global transition of electronic music from underground art to an international phenomenon, with festivals such as Love Parade, Winterworld and MayDay gaining prominence alongside raves and clubs. German electro artists and DJs continue to gain mass popularity, including Zedd, Robin Schulz, Paul van Dyk and Crazy Frog. Paul van Dyke, raised in East Germany, was majorly involved in the Berlin techno scene and is considered one of the best DJs internationally. In 2018, the New York Times described Berlin as "arguably the world capital of underground electronic music".

== Styles originating in Germany ==
Electroclash is a style of music fusing 1980s electro and new wave synthpop with 1990s techno and electronic dance alongside elements of funk and punk. Also known as retro electro, tech pop and synthcore, electroclash primarily utilised keyboards, groove boxes, turntables and computers to produce grooving minimal tracks. More than the music, electroclash encompassed a musical culture of confident presentation: individualistic personalities and sexual freedom. Emerging in the later 1990s, with Berlin becoming an international hotspot, electroclash faded as a distinctive style as it fused into tech house music.

Trance is a form of electronic dance music, characterised by a high rate of beats per minute (120–160), melodic progressive synths and repetitive rhythms. Typical song structure involves mixed layers developing into a build-up, a climax and then a release. Originating in the early 1990s, German minimalist artists, Klaus Schulze and Sven Väth, are often acknowledged as the fathers of trance music.

Schranz is a style of fast and loopy techno electronic music characterised by harsh abrasive machine-like sounds. Emerging in the 1990s, Chris Liebing was at the helm of its development.

Krautrock is a distinct style of progressive rock and electronic music emerging from Germany in the 1960s and 70s. Reacting against commercial and mainstream Anglo-American rock, Krautrock was cemented in a cultural foundation of taking control of their collective destiny away from the memory of Nazi dictatorship. Bands, Faust, Guru Guru, Can and Neu!, parodied traditional rock tropes and experimented with electronic collages, tape manipulations, monotonous rhythms and mystical atmospheres to create avant-garde music. Krautrock enjoyed significant popularity in 1973 as bands including Kraftwerk and Amon Düül II toured outside Germany.

Other styles related to German electronic music include digital hardcore, minimal, Berlin School of electronic music and Düsseldorf School of electronic music.

== Cultural significance ==
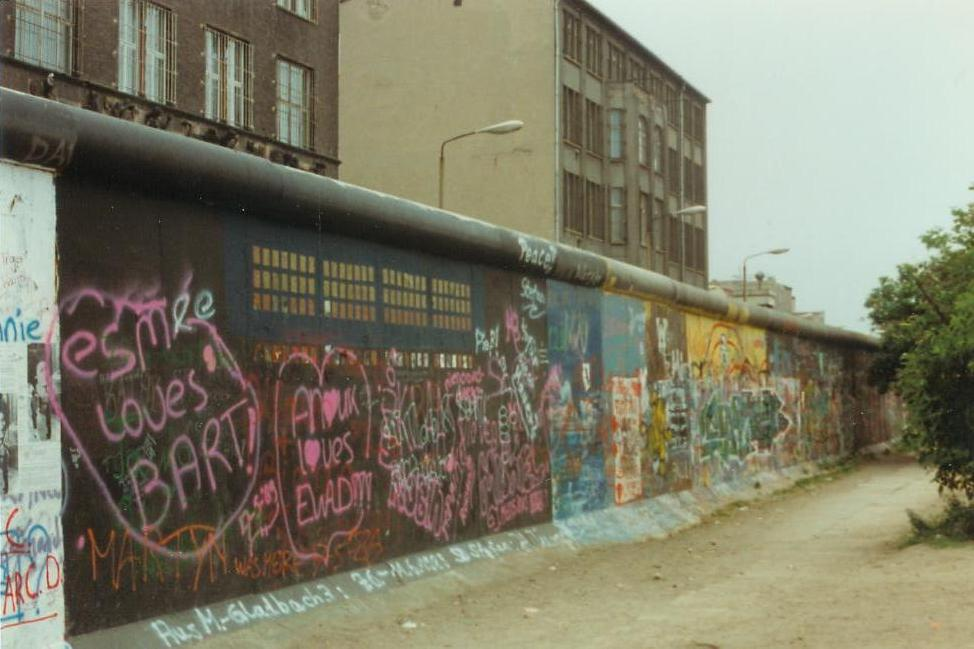
Berlin Wall (June 1989)

The underground subculture of German electronic music is argued to be where the first social reunification took place. Dance entrepreneurs in Schöneberg and Kreuzberg organised House parties, with DJ WestBam and Dr. Motte putting on acid house in the club UFO and co-founding the electronic festival, Love Parade, in 1989. Following the fall of the Berlin Wall and the ensuing transitory period of legal uncertainty, growth in the network of illegal techno parties in the East exploded. From unused factories, derelict bunkers, empty sections adjacent to the Wall's remains, youth fused with techno music to form what is argued the first form of social reunification in Germany. These basement places, like Tekknozid and UFO, developed into legendary clubs, including Tresor and E-Werk. Without a curfew, Berlin's clubs and bars did not close. Queer culture thrived at venues like Metropol and tourists from Europe and internationally flew in, known as 'Easy Jet ravers', to participate in Berlin's explosive rave culture of techno, drugs, fashion and excess.

Furthermore, German electronic music contributed into the 21st century's globalised trend of electronic dance music and fusion into modern pop. In the 1990s, increasing commercialisation and the unifying tendencies of globalisation and local islands of cultural creativity, of which Berlin was key, helped form the explosive popularity of modern popular electronic music. German electronic music contributed to a global transition of electronic music from underground art to an international phenomenon, with festivals such as Love Parade, Winterworld and MayDay gaining prominence alongside raves and clubs.

== German electronic artists ==
Funker Vogt is a German electronic-industrial musical group founded in 1995 with an aggressive style. Their debut album was Thanks for Nothing (1996).

Wumpscut is a German Dark electro-industrial group. Formed by Rudy Ratzinger in 1991, they debuted with their album Defcon and remained active until 2017.

Project Pitchfork was a Hamburg-based German Dark Wave electronic artist, inspired by New Wave artists, pop-oriented groups like SPK, and the New Wave movement of arts including Jean Michael Jean and Vangelis. They debuted with their album K.N.K.A in 1990.

Wolfsheim was a German synthpop and darkwave band formed in 1987 in Hamburg, consisting of Heppner and Reinhardt, who split up in 2009 for personal reasons. Their first album, Ken Manage, was released in 1988.

Kraftwerk was a highly influential electronic pop quartet who formed the foundations for synthesiser music in the 70s and 80s. Achieving international commercial fame and success, their songs, "Autobahn" and "The Model", retains a niche cultural following even today.

== Festivals and events ==
Love Parade was central to international electronic music throughout the 1990s and 2000s. First organised in 1989, it involved vans playing techno music for 300 fans. However, after achieving corporate sponsorship and MTV Europe coverage, by 1997 it had 750,000 to 1,500,000 attendees. Love Parade came to an end in 2010 following a stampede that killed 21 and injured more than 500 people.

Winterworld is an electronic music festival held in Karlsruhe, Germany. Into its 17th year, Winterworld plays techno, house, drum and base, and EDM, featuring famous electronic artists such as Chris Liebing, Pendulum and Charlotte de Witte.

Mayday is an electronic music festival in Germany.
