= Fathy Salama =

Egyptian musician

Fathy Salama (Arabic فتحي سلامة; born 13 February 1951, in Cairo) is a Grammy Award-winning Egyptian musician, who usually appears with his ensemble Sharkiat (شرقيات, "Easterners").

== Biography ==
Salama grew up listening to the radio, which played artists who placed a deep influence upon him. His childhood influences were musicians Umm Kulthum, Mohammed Abdel Wahab and Farid El Atrache. These artists influenced him so much that he decided to get involved with music; he then started to create his own versatile style of music, from playing the piano from the age of six and followed by gigging in Cairo clubs from the age of thirteen. Soon the child of Shobra, the 'Compton of Cairo', made visits to Europe and to New York City to learn jazz with such artists as Barry Harris, Sun Ra, Roman Bunka, Hal Galper, and Pat Patrick.

He progressed to making plenty of hits in Cairo during the 1980s. He has been touring the world, and he has won two prizes for his film soundtracks for Fallen Angels Paradises and Signs of April. It is with Sharkiat (his own group) that Fathy is making his dreams come true of merging modern and traditional music together.

Fathy has collaborated in electronic music with Kouchari or his meeting with Alix Roy, and in sacred music on Egypt, the Youssou N'Dour album (Grammy Award for Best Contemporary World Music Album and BBC Award).

Fathy held a lot of workshops to help amateurs with his experience, which produced -workshops- artists such as Dina El Wedidi and others.

== Discography ==
- Ibn Battuta 1994 Schneeball with Embryo
- Color Me Cairo 1995 Enja with Roman Bunka
- Sultany 2006 (Incognito Rec.)

== Performance ==
- Philadelphia, USA, 2014: Fathy Salama performed with Al-Bustan Takht Ensemble as part of Al-Bustan Seeds of Culture concert series.
