= Galloping Wonder Stag =

Hungarian music group

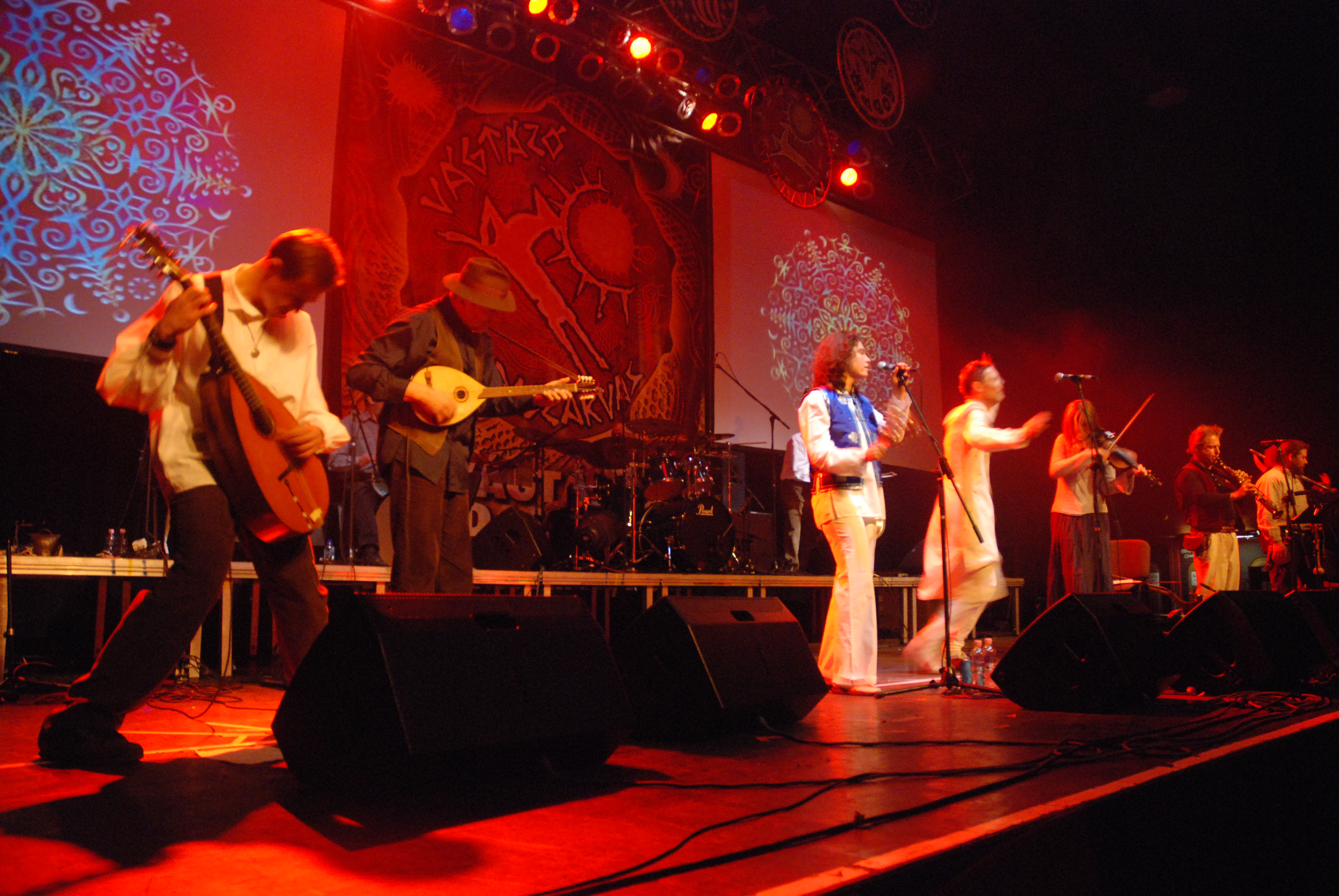
- Galloping Wonder Stag at a Budapest concert in 2007

Background information
- Origin: Budapest, Hungary
- Genres: folk rock, psychedelic rock
- Years active: 2005–present
- Members: Atilla Grandpierre- vocals Bernadett M. Gebri – vocals Csaba Bakos – percussion Botond Bese – bagpipes Róbert Benkó – double bass András Fazekas – drums András Fábri – cister Géza Fábri – strings Krisztina Molnár – violin Géza Orczi – tapan, ud, saz, buzuki, dzura, tambura, tamburica Zsolt Vaskó – wind instruments
- Past members: Kálmán Balogh – cimbalom Félix Benke; Mátyás Bolya – lute Tamás Geröly – drums Szabolcs Róka – lute Balázs Szokolay Dongó – winds
- Website: www.vagtazocsodaszarvas.hu

Galloping Wonder Stag (native name Vágtázó Csodaszarvas, 2005–present) is a Hungarian music group, associated with world music, psychedelic folk, folk rock and shamanic music labels, continuing Galloping Coroners psychedelic music replacing electronic guitars and drums with acoustic folk instruments.

== History ==
Galloping Wonder Stag has been founded by Attila Grandpierre, leader of Galloping Coroners (1975–2001) in 2005. The band has about 10–12 members, most of them folk musicians. They use acoustic instruments e.g. tapan, derbuka, violin, bagpipe, folks wind instruments, doublebass, tambura, cister and kobsa.

== Style ==
Galloping Wonder Stag can be categorized either as a unique subgenre of world music or a derivate it from Galloping Coroners' shaman punk, as an acoustic, folk-instrumented, neotraditional shaman punk that made one step closer to original shamanic music and folk music. Galloping Wonder Stag use ethnographic materials as manuals on how to reach and communicate ecstatic states. Galloping Wonder Stag plays ancient psychedelic shaman music coming from the oldest roots of Hungarian folk music at Eurasian nomad horse people's tradition.

Galloping Wonder Stag's music is built on band leader Grandpierre's past experiences with Galloping Coroners replacing rock instruments (electric guitars, drum) with acoustic folk instruments. Grandpierre's lyrics praise Hungarian prehistoric culture.

=== International reputation ===
Galloping Wonder Stag is especially famous for its live performance.

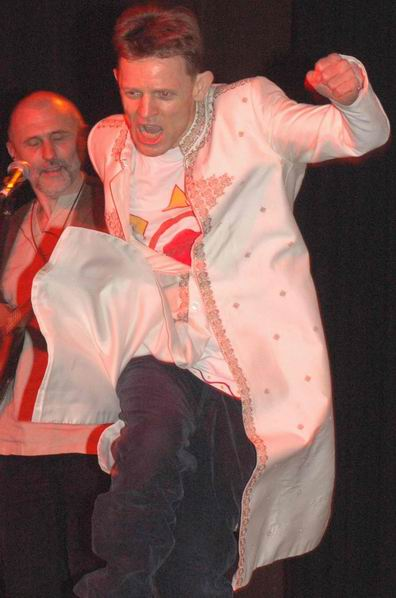
Atilla Grandpierre and Géza Fábri perform in Budapest in 2006

== Discography ==
- Pure Source (2006)
- Endless Asia (2008)
- Star Ride (2011)

== Members ==
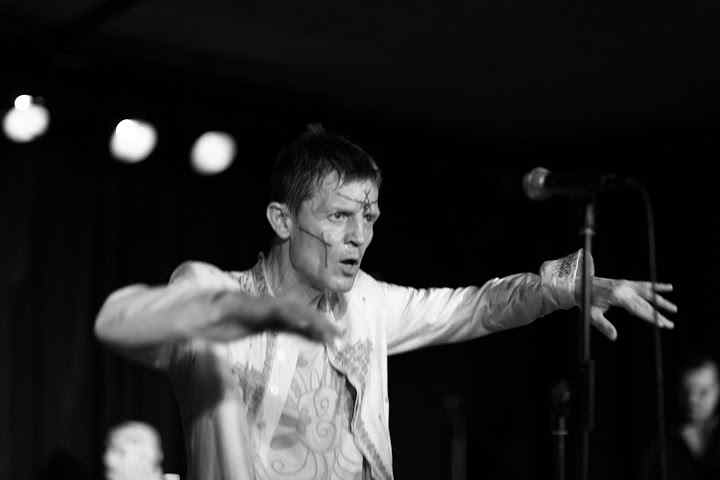
Frontman Atilla Grandpierre performs in Budapest in 2011

Pure Source (2006)

Attila Grandpierre – vocals Botond Bese – bagpipes Kálmán Balogh – cimbalom Félix Benke – drums Róbert Benkő – double bass Mátyás Bolya – lute Tamás Geröly drums Bernadett Márton – vocals Krisztina Molnár – violins Szabolcs Róka – lute Balázs Szokolay Dongó – winds

Endless Asia (2008)

Attila Grandpierre – vocals Bernadett M. Gebri – vocals Csaba Bakos – percussion Botond Bese – bagpipes Róbert Benkó – double bass András Fazekas – drums András Fábri – cister Géza Fábri – strings Krisztina Molnár – violin Géza Orczi – tapan, ud, saz, buzuki, dzura, tambura, tamburica Zsolt Vaskó – wind instruments

== Bibliography ==
1. Vágtázó Csodaszarvas, Wikipedia in Hungarian
2. Attila Grandpierre: Punk As a Rebirth of Shamanist Folk Music
3. "Contemplating the Heavens with VHK's Atilla Grandpierre", by Jordan N. Mamone, at www.vice.com, 2013
