= Paradieswärts Düül =

Studio album by Amon Düül
- Released: 1970
- Label: Ohr
- Producer: Julius Schittenhelm

Amon Düül chronology
Collapsing/Singvögel Rückwärts & Co. (1969)	Paradieswärts Düül (1970)	Disaster (1971)

Professional ratings
Review scores
Source	Rating
Allmusic	3/5 stars

Paradieswärts Düül is the third album by the German band Amon Düül. With its careful songwriting structure, it sounded unlike any of the band's previous work. In contrast to the communal, free-form improvisations of the earlier Amon Düül albums (generally thought to have all been recorded in a single "jam session" with various commune members coming and going throughout), Paradieswarts Düül was recorded with a smaller, more stable lineup of musicians. The pastoral, folk-influenced sound of the record has been compared to the gentler work of American bands Love and the Velvet Underground. The first word of the title is a German construction meaning "paradise-wards", as in "towards paradise".

The album was re-released on CD in 1996 by Spalax Records. This version added two bonus tracks, from the single "Eternal Flow / Paramechanical World" released slightly before the album. This same master was also used for the 1997 edition issued by Repertoire Records in Germany.

Though the groups had split apart some years before due to differing musical aims, the album features contributions from Amon Düül II members John Weinzierl and Chris 'Shrat' Thiele on the track "Paramechanische Welt". In turn Rainer and Ulrich of Amon Düül (I) had appeared on the track "Sandoz in the Rain" on Amon Düül II's album Yeti, recorded the same year.

== Track listing ==
Side one

1. "Love Is Peace" – 17:09

Side two

1. "Snow Your Thirst and Sun Your Open Mouth" – 9:25
2. "Paramechanische Welt" – 7:38

Bonus tracks:

4. "Eternal Flow" – 4:10
5. "Paramechanical World" – 5:44

== Personnel ==
Album tracks

"Love Is Peace"

- Rainer "Dadam" Bauer - lead vocals, acoustic guitar, lyrics
- Ulrich Leopold - bass, backing vocals, piano
- Ella Bauer - harp, bongos
- Klaus "Lemur" Esser - percussion, backing vocals, melody guitar
- Hansi Fischer - flute, bongos

"Snow Your Thurst And Sun Your Open Mouth"

- Ulrich Leopold - guitar
- Klaus "Lemur" Esser - fuzz guitar
- Rainer "Dadam" Bauer - bass
- Helge Filanda - drums
- Angelika "Noam" Filanda - African drums

"Paramechanische Welt"

- Rainer "Dadam" Bauer - vocals, guitar
- Ulrich Leopold - guitar
- John Weinzierl - guitar
- Chris 'Shrat' Thiele - bongos

Bonus single tracks

- Ulrich Leopold - bass, guitar, trumpet, drums, vocals
- Rainer Bauer - guitar, bass, vocals
- Klaus Esser - guitar, bass, drums, vocals
- Helge Filanda - drums, guitar, vocals
- Angelika Filanda - flute, vocals
- Ella Bauer - harp, vocals
