= Vive La Trance =

Studio album by Amon Düül II
- Released: 1973
- Genre: Krautrock
- Length: 43:36
- Label: United Artists
- Producer: Olaf Kübler and Amon Düül II

Amon Düül II chronology
| Live in London (1973) | Vive La Trance (1973) | Hijack (1974) |

Vive La Trance is the seventh studio album released by German Krautrock band Amon Düül II, released in 1973. Produced by Olaf Kübler and Amon Düül II and engineered by Peter Kramper, Vive La Trance was recorded and remixed at Bavaria Studios with additional remixing done at Union Studio München. The album sleeve's photography was done by Falk U. Rogner and Gena Zimmerman, with additional design and artwork by Jürgen Rogner. The song "Mozambique" is dedicated to the political revolutionary Monika Ertl.

== Track listing ==
All music is composed by Karrer/Weinzierl/Leopold/Knaup/Rogner/Heibl except where indicated.

| No. | Title | Lyrics | Music | Length |
|---|---|---|---|---|
| 1. | "A Morning Excuse" | Weinzierl | | 3:19 |
| 2. | "Fly United" | Heibl | | 3:33 |
| 3. | "Jalousie" | Rogner | | 3:27 |
| 4. | "Im Krater Blühn Wieder Die Bäume" | instrumental | | 3:08 |
| 5. | "Mozambique (Dedicated to Monika Ertl)" | Leopold | | 7:22 |
| 6. | "Apocalyptic Bore" | Karrer | | 5:50 |
| 7. | "Dr. Jeckyll" | Weinzierl | | 3:00 |
| 8. | "Trap" | Weinzierl | | 3:35 |
| 9. | "Pig Man" | Weinzierl | | 2:38 |
| 10. | "Mañana" | Karrer | Karrer/Weinzierl/Leopold | 3:20 |
| 11. | "Ladies Mimikry" | Karrer | Karrer/Weinzierl/Leopold | 3:18 |

== Personnel ==
- John Weinzierl - electric guitar (1–9,11), acoustic guitar (3,4), bass guitar (2,10,11), vocals (7,9)
- Chris Karrer - electric guitar (2,5-11), 12 string guitar (6), violin (6,11), saxophone (2,8,9,11), mellotron (10), maracas (10), vocals (1,6,10,11)
- Peter Leopold - drums (1–11), percussion (10), grand piano (1,5)
- Renate Krötenschwanz Knaup - vocals (2,3,5,7-9), choir (1,5)
- Falk U. Rogner - organ (4–6,8), VCS 3 (1,4-8), harmonium (6)
- Robby Heibl - electric guitar (1,2), 12 string guitar (2), bass guitar (3–9), cello (1), violin (6,7), choir (1), gurke (5), vocals (2,7,9)

With guests:

- Peter Kramper - grand piano (2,3)
- Lothar Meid - choir (5), finger snaps (5)
- Keith Forsey - percussion (5), choir (5), finger snaps (5)
- Desmond Bonner - choir (5), vocals (6)
