= Wolf City =

Studio album by Amon Düül II
- Released: 1972
- Recorded: July 1972
- Studio: Bavaria Studios
- Genres: Krautrock, progressive rock
- Length: 34:41
- Label: United Artists
- Producers: Olaf Kübler, Amon Düül II

Amon Düül II chronology
Carnival in Babylon (1972)	Wolf City (1972)	Live in London (1973)

Professional ratings
Review scores
Source	Rating
Allmusic	4/5 stars

Wolf City is the fifth studio album released by the German rock band Amon Düül II.

Like its predecessor, Carnival in Babylon, Wolf City is a more conventional recording than the band's earlier albums, with shorter track times and more straightforward song structures. This was likely due to the band's increasing commercial popularity, both at home and in the UK. Despite this, some of the album's tracks, such as "Jail-House-Frog" and "Deutsch Nepal", are still overtly experimental. The US LP has the sides reversed. Side one begins with "Wolf City" and side two with "Surrounded by the Stars". (However, the covers show the correct track order.)

== Track listing ==
"Green-Bubble-Raincoated-Man"

No.	Title	Writer(s)	Length
1.	"Surrounded by the Stars"	Chris Karrer, Falk-Ulrich Rogner	7:44
2.	"Green-Bubble-Raincoated-Man"	John Weinzierl	5:03
3.	"Jail-House-Frog"	Weinzierl	4:56
4.	"Wolf City"	Weinzierl, Karrer, Lothar Meid, Rogner, Daniel Fichelscher	3:20
5.	"Wie der Wind am Ende einer Strasse"	Weinzierl, Karrer, Rogner, Meid, Fichelscher	5:47
6.	"Deutsch Nepal"	Olaf Kübler, Meid	2:57
7.	"Sleepwalker's Timeless Bridge"	Fichelscher, Rogner	4:53

Bonus tracks on Gamma CD reissue (83803):

No.	Title	Writer(s)	Length
8.	"What You Gonna Do"	Kübler, Meid	6:37
9.	"Las Vegas"	Kübler, Meid	4:19
10.	"Mueller's Frau-Jam"	Peter Leopold	10:53

Bonus tracks on 2007 Revisited CD reissue (SPV 305372):

No.	Title	Writer(s)	Length
8.	"Kindermörderlied"	Karrer	5:59
9.	"Mystic Blutsturz"	Weinzierl, Renate Knaup-Krötenschwanz	10:11
10.	"Düülirium"	Weinzierl, Karrer, Jan Kahler, Knaup-Krötenschwanz	4:25

== Personnel ==
=== Amon Düül II ===
- Renate Knaup-Krötenschwanz – lead vocals (tracks 5–7), backing vocals (track 1)
- Chris Karrer – electric guitar (tracks 1, 4–6), violin (tracks 2, 4, 5), 12-string guitar (track 5), soprano saxophone (track 7)
- John Weinzierl – electric guitar; backing vocals (track 1), lead vocals (track 7)
- Falk-Ulrich Rogner – organ (tracks 1, 2, 4, 5), clavioline (tracks 5, 7), synthesizer (tracks 2, 5), raven sounds (track 7)
- Lothar Meid – bass; lead vocals (tracks 1, 7), synthesizer (track 5)
- D. Secundus Fichelscher – drums; backing vocals (track 1), lead vocals (track 4), electric guitar (track 4), acoustic guitar (track 4)

=== Guest personnel ===
- Olaf Kübler – soprano saxophone (track 2), lead vocals (track 7)
- Al Sri Al Gromer – sitar (track 2)
- Pandit Shankar Lal – tablas (track 2)
- Liz van Neienhoff – tambura (track 2)
- Paul Heyda – violin (tracks 2)
- Jimmy Jackson – choir organ (tracks 3, 5–7), piano (tracks 3, 5, 7)
- Rolf Zacher – lead vocals (tracks 3, 7)
- Peter Leopold – synthesizer (track 6), timbales (track 2), lead vocals (tracks 7)
