= Egypt (album) =

Studio album by Youssou N'Dour
- Released: June 8, 2004
- Studios: Studio Xippi (Dakar), Hany Mihanna (Cairo), Mix (Cairo)
- Genre: World
- Length: 41:10
- Language: Wolof
- Label: Nonesuch
- Producers: Youssou N'Dour, Fathy Salama

Youssou N'Dour chronology
Kirikou (2004)	Egypt (2004)	Badou (2006)

Egypt is a Grammy Award-winning album by the Senegalese musician Youssou N'Dour, on which he is accompanied by the Egyptian Fathy Salama Orchestra. By incorporating Arabic influences and focusing on Muslim religious themes, the album was a departure from previous N'Dour releases. In the original Senegalese release, it was named Sant Allah (Thanks to God).

== Background and recording ==
The album was largely recorded in 1999 in Dakar, Senegal, and was originally slated for release as early as 2001, but was delayed until 2004 to avoid any association with the September 11 attacks. Additional overdubs of oud and traditional orchestra were done in Cairo, Egypt, where N'Dour's quartet was joined by the Fathy Salama Orchestra for most songs.

On this album, N'Dour combines both West African and North African musical influences. The record uses instruments from both regions, such as the West African kora and the Arab oud.

The lyrics are in praise of Mouride Sufism, a Senegalese order of Islam to which N'Dour belongs. The songs are sung in Wolof, with the last song incorporating more French loanwords than the rest of the album, and are mostly dedicated to marabouts of the Muslim brotherhoods of Senegal, such as Amadou Bamba, the founder of the Mouride brotherhood.

The album is named as a tribute to Egyptian singer Umm Kulthum, who was a favorite of N'Dour's father and influenced N'Dour as a child.

== Critical reception ==
Professional ratings
Review scores
Source	Rating
AllMusic	4/5 stars
The Guardian	4/5 stars

Egypt was a critical success among Western music critics, who appreciated its bridging of cultures and authentic religious commitment. Writing for The Observer, Charlie Gillett called this a "devotional album" and "one of Youssou's best-ever records", praising its "honed precision and focused concentration".

Writing for the BBC, Jon Lusk warned that some fans of N'Dour may not appreciate the departure from his previous upbeat and rhythmic music, but called the album "a breath of fresh air", because "the consistency of tone and mood --generally one of reverent but restrained ecstasy -- is very welcome."

Robert Christgau wrote that the musical fusion on Egypt is "smarter, lovelier, and more seductive" than N'Dour's previous work, and that the singing is characterized by "sweetness, precision, and delicacy". Referring to the efforts the album makes to positively represent African Islam during the period after the September 11 attacks, Christgau wrote that "Egypt is more than just beautiful -- it's a persuasive political act".

AllMusic's Thom Jurek called it a "startling" album, saying that:

Unlike his previous recordings, the organic and sacred character of this music seems to stand outside of time and space; it wails and warbles, croons and groans. It is the music of joy and reverence and, as it bridges the various aspects of Islamic cultural traditions, one hopes it can create, via the sheer beauty of its sound and the translation of its lyrics, a portrait of a world that is far different from the one portrayed by Western media constructs.

== Controversy ==
Although Egypt was received positively by Western audiences, its release was controversial in Africa and Muslim societies. Media in N'Dour's native Senegal argued that it was inappropriate to bring Islam into popular music, and that by associating the two, the album is insulting to the religion. This resulted in a two-year boycott of the album in Senegal, with stores returning copies and radio stations not playing the music. The album was also banned in Egypt.

This negative reaction impacted N'Dour personally, who was shunned during a religious pilgrimage to the holy city of Touba, and was threatened with a lawsuit by members of the Mouride brotherhood. Speaking about this controversy in his native culture, N'Dour told Reuters, "I was frustrated. The music wasn't speaking to people...When there's a break with tradition, or something changes, people can't accept it right away. It takes a little more time."

Egypt is the primary focus of 2008 documentary film Youssou N'Dour: I Bring What I Love, directed by Elizabeth Chai Vasarhelyi. The film explores the cultural controversy surrounding the album's recording and release.

== Accolades ==
Egypt won the 2004 Grammy Award for "Best Contemporary World Music Album", earning N'Dour his only Grammy Award. At the BBC Radio 3 Awards for World Music, the album won the Critics Award for album of the year.

N'Dour also won a MOBO award in 2005 for "Best African Act".

Robert Christgau named it his 18th favorite album of the decade in 2009

== Track listing ==
All tracks by Youssou N'Dour.

No.	Title	Length
1.	"Allah"	6:12
2.	"Shukran Bamba"	5:32
3.	"Mahdiyu Laye"	4:59
4.	"Tijaniyya"	5:47
5.	"Baay Niasse"	5:20
6.	"Bamba the Poet"	3:53
7.	"Cheikh Ibra Fall"	3:38
8.	"Touba - Daru Salaam"	5:49
Total length:		41:10

== Personnel ==
- Hassan Khaleel – score manager
- Yaser Mal Allah – percussion
- Shebl Abdallah – magruna
- Beugue Fallou Ensemble – percussion, backing vocals
- Philippe Brun – mixing
- Mamdou Dia – author
- Cheikh Amala Diallo – English translations, transcription
- Mostafa Abd El Azeez – arghul
- Ahmed El Gazar – sagat
- Mamdouh El Gebaly – oud
- Alaa El Kashief – engineer
- Nidhat Adb El Sameeh – violin
- Bisheer Ewees – violin
- Mbaye Dieye Faye – percussion
- Kabou Gueye – backing vocals
- Mama Gueye – backing vocals
- Souka Gueye – backing vocals
- Hasaneen Hindy – mizmar
- Yuri Kablotsky – violin
- Babou Laye – kora
- Robert C. Ludwig – mastering
- Ramadan Mansoor – tabla
- Youssou N'Dour – vocals, producer, English translations, audio production
- Ndiaga N'Dour – engineer
- Segui Niang – engineer
- Frank Olinsky – design
- Khalid Raaouf – engineer
- Veronique Rolland – photography
- Thomas Rome – English translations
- Fathy Salama – arranger, conductor, producer, audio production
- Ayman Sedky – duhulla
- Cheikh Thiam – English translations, transcription

== Charts ==
Chart (2004)	Peak position
Belgian Albums (Ultratop Flanders)	57
Belgian Albums (Ultratop Wallonia)	70
Dutch Albums (MegaCharts)	100
Dutch Alternative Albums (MegaCharts)	16
Finnish Albums (Suomen virallinen lista)	35
French Albums (SNEP)	34
Swiss Albums (Schweizer Hitparade)	81
UK Albums (OCC)	148
US World Albums (Billboard)	6
