= Phallus Dei =

Studio album by Amon Düül II
- Released: 1969
- Genre: Krautrock; progressive rock; psychedelic rock; avant-garde
- Length: 41:38
- Label: Liberty, Repertoire
- Producer: Olaf Kübler

Amon Düül II chronology
Phallus Dei (1969)	Yeti (1970)

Professional ratings
Review scores
Source	Rating
AllMusic	4.5/5 stars

Phallus Dei (Latin: God's Phallus) is the debut album by German band Amon Düül II. The album was the result of the Amon Düül commune in Munich splitting. The album features layered guitars, abstract percussion, and chant-like vocals. It is often cited (alongside Can's Monster Movie) as the original Krautrock album.

Its first reissue on CD was on the Mantra label in 1988. All known copies list the songs in incorrect order on the cover, but present them correctly on the disc itself, except for the 1993 Repertoire Records re-issue. It was reissued in 2001, digitally remastered by Eroc, and contained two extra tracks: "Freak Out Requiem (Parts I–IV)" and "Cymbals in the End".

The 2006 re-remastered reissue on the German label Revisited Records contains two bonus tracks: "TouchMaPhal" (10:17) and "I Want the Sun to Shine" (10:32). It does not contain the bonus material from the 2001 reissue.

== Track listing ==
All tracks composed by Amon Düül II.

Side A
No.	Title	Length
1.	"Kanaan"	4:03
2.	"Dem Guten, Schönen, Wahren"	6:14
3.	"Luzifers Ghilom"	8:35
4.	"Henriette Krötenschwanz"	2:03

Side B
No.	Title	Length
5.	"Phallus Dei"	20:49

Bonus tracks (2001)
No.	Title	Length
6.	"Freak-Out Requiem I"	4:02
7.	"Freak-Out Requiem II"	3:47
8.	"Freak-Out Requiem III"	0:42
9.	"Freak-Out Requiem IV"	7:49
10.	"Cymbals in the End"	0:31

Bonus tracks (2006)
No.	Title	Length
6.	"TouchMaPhal"	10:17
7.	"I Want the Sun to Shine"	10:32

== Personnel ==
Amon Düül II:

- Dieter Serfas – drums, electric cymbals
- Peter Leopold – drums
- Shrat (Christian Thiele) – bongos, vocals, violin
- Renate Knaup – vocals, tambourine
- John Weinzierl – guitar, 12-string, bass
- Chris Karrer – violin, guitar, twelve-string guitar, soprano saxophone, vocals
- Falk Rogner – organ
- Dave Anderson – bass

Guest musicians:

- Holger Trülzsch – Turkish drums
- Christian Burchard – vibraphone

=== Credits ===
- Gerd Stein – photography
- Olaf Kübler – producer
