= Carnival in Babylon =

Studio album by Amon Düül II
- Released: 1972
- Recorded: 1971
- Genre: Krautrock; psychedelic rock
- Length: 37:18
- Label: United Artists

Amon Düül II chronology
Tanz der Lemminge (1971)	Carnival in Babylon (1972)	Wolf City (1972)

Professional ratings
Review scores
Source	Rating
Allmusic	3/5 stars

Carnival in Babylon is an LP by German rock band Amon Düül II which was released in 1972. It is their fourth studio album. It was recorded at the Bavaria Studio (with Peter Kramper as the engineer) and remixed at Studio 70 (with Jürgen Koppers as the engineer). It was produced by Olaf Kübler and the band themselves. The original cover design and photos were by F.U. Rogner.

All lyrics written in English, except on C.I.D. in Uruk written in German.

== Track listing ==
No.	Title	Lyrics	Music	Length
1.	"C.I.D. in Uruk"	Weinzierl	Weinzierl	05:30
2.	"All the Years 'Round"	Rogner	Weinzierl, Knaup	07:18
3.	"Shimmering Sand"	Rogner	Karrer	06:36
4.	"Kronwinkl 12"	Weinzierl	Weinzierl	03:50
5.	"Tables Are Turned"	Rogner	Karrer	03:33
6.	"Hawknose Harlequin"	Rogner	Karrer, Meid, Weinzierl, Hausmann, Fichelscher, Leopold	09:49

Bonus tracks on 2002 Repertoire CD reissue (REP 4966):

No.	Title	Writer(s)	Length
1.	"Light"	Meid	03:47
2.	"Lemmingmania"	Weinzierl	02:57
3.	"Between the Eyes"	Karrer, Weinzierl	02:24
4.	"All the Years 'Round" (single version)	Weinzierl, Knaup, Rogner	04:10

Bonus tracks on 2007 Revisited CD reissue (SPV 305352 CD):

No.	Title	Writer(s)	Length
1.	"Skylight"	Weinzierl	09:50
2.	"Tatzelwurmloch"	Karrer, Weinzierl, Meid, Knaup	17:45

== Personnel ==
=== Amon Düül II ===
- John Weinzierl – electric guitar, acoustic 12-string guitar, vocal
- Chris Karrer – electric guitar, acoustic guitar, violin, soprano sax, vocal
- Lothar Meid – bass, vocal
- Renate Knaup-Krötenschwanz – vocal
- Danny Fichelscher – drums, congas
- Peter Leopold – drums, tambourine
- Karl-Heinz Hausmann – keyboards, electronics

=== Guests ===
- Joy Alaska – backing vocals
- Falk Ulrich Rogner – organ *
- Olaf Kübler – soprano sax, door

(*) Falk Rogner was previously a band member, but listed as a guest for this album; he returned as a full member on the next album.
