= Schneeball (record label) =

German record label

Schneeball was a German independent record label founded in Munich in 1976 by Embryo, Missus Beastly, Sparifankal, Ton Steine Scherben, and Julius Schittenhelm, who cooperatively organized the distribution. The label was initially APRIL Records, but was renamed in 1977.

== History ==
The start of APRIL Records attracted much attention. After CBS threatened to take legal action, its name was changed to "Schneeball" ("Snowball") in 1977. Samplers entitled "April ist Schneeball" ("April is Snowball") enabled it to remain recognizable in the music and media landscapes. The name was chosen to express the energy in the center of the music spectrum and the expansion and development along its margins. Other artists who published at Schneeball include Real Ax Band, Munju, Checkpoint Charlie, Moira, and Hammerfest. An important cooperating partner for distribution via bookstores was the Trikont label "Unsere Stimme" ("Our Voice"), which had sprouted from the Trikont publishing company.

Distribution was taken over by EfA (Energie für Alle) at the beginning of the 1980s. Schneeball Oper 1 und 2 (Snowball Operas 1 and 2) were developed as a new cooperative project.

The distribution structure became increasingly independent, but this autonomy unfortunately proved detrimental to the interests of the producing artists. Consequently, Efa and INDIGO Musikvertrieb separated in 1992.

Schneeball's most productive era was already over by the mid-1980s. The reasons were manifold. Ton Stein Scherben broke up. Rio Reiser began a solo career at Sony. At EMBRYO too, many years of collaboration among the musicians and composers Christian Burchard, Roman Bunka, and Uve Müllrich came to an end after a trip to India – but not before the releases of the double LP “EMBRYO’s Reise” [“EMBRYO’s Trip”], a road movie, and a music documentary film 'Vagabundenkarawane' ("Caravan of Vagabonds”) by Werner Penzel and Nico Humpert.

EMBRYO's dissidents hived off, joined forces with Hartmut Bremer, and co-founded the EXIL label, likewise at INDIGO. Christian Burchard formed EMBRYO anew with different personnel. Sparifankal switched to a new label and a new distributor. Othmar Schreckeneder, EMBRYO's producer since 1972, continued to publish audio recordings until the mid-1990s on the Schneeball label with EMBRYO and its guest musicians from diverse cultures and countries. He also published radio plays for Bayerischer Rundfunk [Bavarian Radio] (Ernst Jandl, Grace Yoon) and works by artists such as Eugen de Ryck, Chris Karrer, and Amon Düül II. EMBRYO switched to Trikont, thus remaining under Indigo's distribution. Only Schreckeneder continued to use the label for occasional new releases, e.g. Charlie Mariano with Rama Mani in 2005 or Peter Michael Hamel with Thomas Gundermann in 2014.

Schneeball was the trailblazer of the "Independent Label" movement, which conquered its place in the global music industry.

== First issues of April/Schneeball ==
- (0000) : Sparifankal - Bayernrock
- (0001) : Missus Beastly - Dr. Aftershave And The Mixed Pickles
- (0002) : Ton Steine Scherben - Wenn die Nacht am tiefsten ...
- (0003) : Embryo - Live
- (0004) : Julius Schittenhelm - Aristoteles
- (0005) : Embryo - Bad Heads And Bad Cats
- (0006) : Brühwarm Theater / Ton Steine Scherben - Mannstoll
- (0007) : Ton Steine Scherben - Keine Macht für Niemand
- (0008) : Ton Steine Scherben - Warum geht es mir so dreckig?
- (0009) : The Real Ax Band - nicht stehen bleiben, move your ass in time
- (0010) : Embryo - Apo Calypso
- (0011) : Missus Beastly - Space Guerrillia
- (0013) : APRIL ist SCHNEEBALL // sampler
- (0018) : Sparifankal - Huraxdax Drudnhax
- (0020) : Embryo - Embryo's Reise
- (0021) : Julius Schittenheim - Müllmutanten
- (0023) : Embryo - Live
- (2012) : Munju - Highspeed Kindergarten
- (2014) : Moira - Crazy Count Down
- (2015) : Checkpoint Charlie - Frühling, der Krüppel
- [2017) : Munju - Moon You
- (2019) : Checkpoint Charly - Die Durchsichtige
- (2022) : Munju - Brot & Spiele
- (2024) : Checkpoint Charly - Kravall im Schweinestall
- (3025) : Hammerfest - Hier bei uns
- (3026) : Hammerfest - Schleudertest
- (00-002) : Armadillo Texas - Huch
- (12–1035): Hammerfest - Dezente Elemente
- (ST-HFOO 1) : Hammerfest - An einem schönen Tag in Mai / Wir jagen diese Irren aus unserem Land
- (ASS1) : Elastic Rock Band - Faruks Traum
- (ASS3) : Unsonst und Draussen (sampler Vlotho' 76
- (ASS5) : Embryo - Anthology
- (ASS9) : Gebärväterli - In Tal der Emmen
- (MC-1) Dissident of Embryo (Compact Cassette)
- (nnnn) = historical distribution number
- additional : three live samplers : Vlotho - umsonst und draussen 1975 / 1976 / 1977
- (LC 5372) : Hammerfest - Schöne Grüße aus Hammerfest (first Schneeball CD (1991))

== See also ==
- List of record labels
