= Attila Grandpierre =

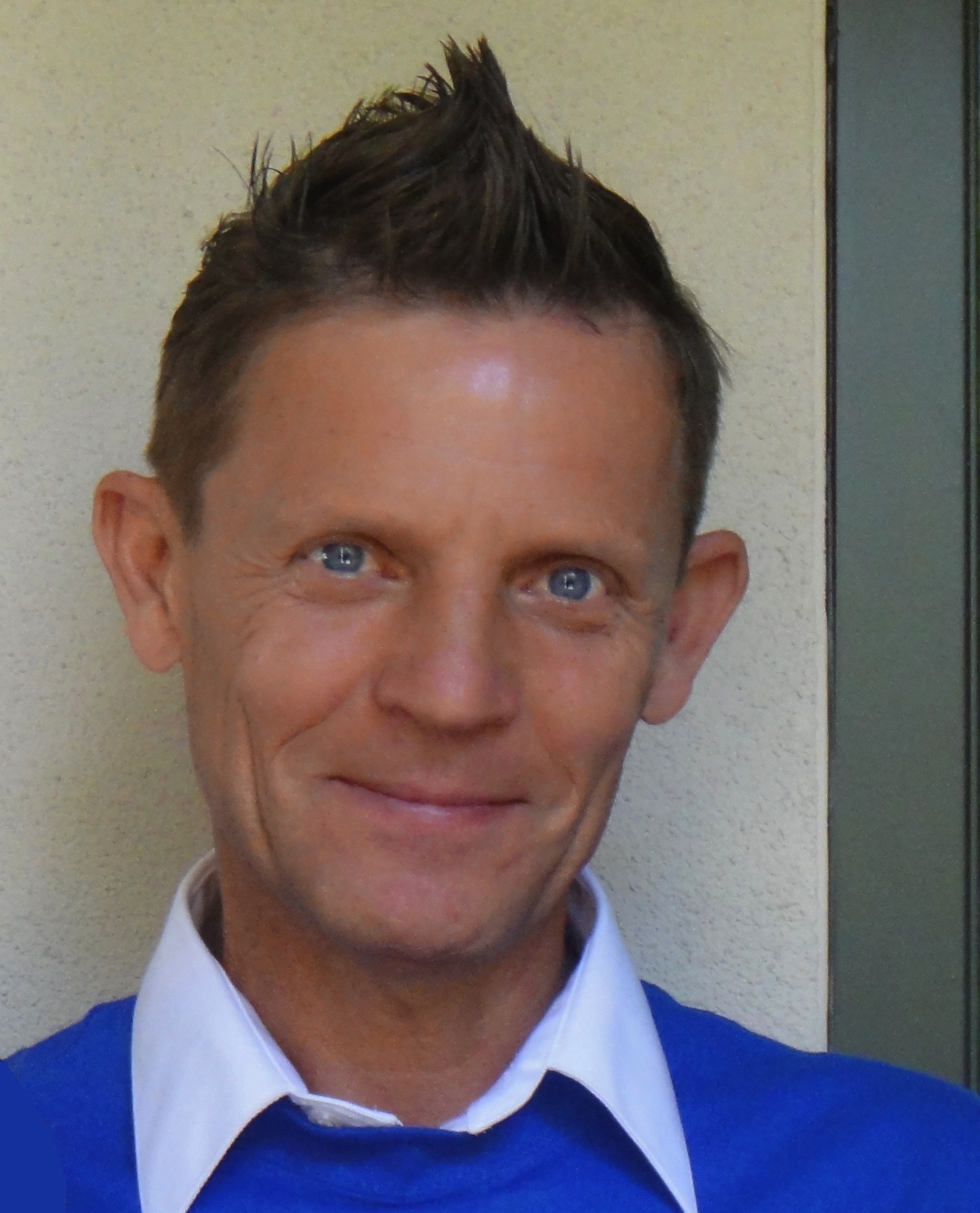
- At Chapman University in 2011
- Born: Grandpierre Attila; 4 July 1951 (age 75); Budapest
- Education: Eötvös Loránd University, Fac. of Physics and Astronomy
- Occupations: astrophysicist; musician (vocalist); writer; poet; self-taught historian
- Musical career
- Genres: Primordial magic folk; Shaman punk; psychedelic rock; punk rock; world music
- Instrument: vocals
- Years active: 1975-present
- Website: http://www.grandpierre.hu/site/english/

Attila Grandpierre (Hungarian: Grandpierre Attila; born 4 July 1951) is a Hungarian musician, astrophysicist, physicist, self-taught historian, writer and poet. He is best known as leader/vocalist of the Galloping Coroners (Hungarian: Vágtázó Halottkémek), an original shamanic music band.

== Personal worldview ==
From his childhood on he was very interested in dealing with the Sun, the cosmos, music and the nature of life. As an adult he is looking for the answer whether the Universe does have a physical, biological or psychological nature.

== Life ==
=== Ancestry ===
Grandpierre's family name comes from French Huguenot ancestors, according to family tradition, with some French bishops, of whom one, Louis Grandpierre, was a Swiss politician and president of the Swiss Appeal Court, and another, Károly Grandpierre, a writer and consultant of Lajos Kossuth, settled in Hungary.

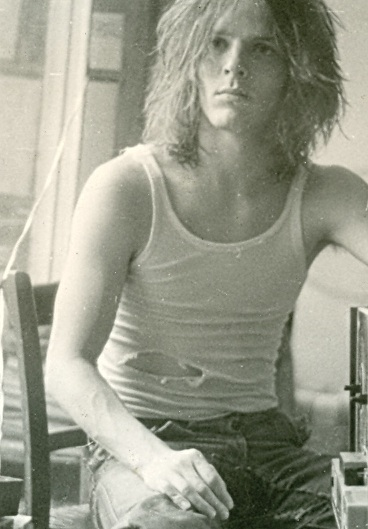
Attila Grandpierre at age 30 in 1981

=== Young years, family ===
Grandpierre was born in Hungary under the Soviet regime on 4 July 1951 in Budapest. His father, Endre Grandpierre K. was a writer and historian. His father's studies on history greatly influenced the small Attila. He was five years old when he stated that he wanted to become an astronomer, dealing with the Sun, and seven years old when he stated that he wanted to become a singer. He graduated at ELTE as a physicist-astronomer in 1974, and got his Ph.D. in 1977.

== Physicist career ==
He studied theoretical biology focused on Ervin Bauer's works. In 2009 his subject field of interest concerned the relation between astronomy and civilization. During 1995-1998 he worked with Professor Ervin László studying the physics of collective consciousness and the quantum-vacuum interactions. In 2011 he was an invited professor on Computational Biology at the Chapman University, California for six months.

As physicist he had a strong interest in the problem of bringing the sciences and metaphysics together. He paid special attention to interdisciplinal science and complexity of living systems in 2008. He paid special attention to comprehensive science unifying the sciences of matter, life and mind, deepening the explanatory structure of sciences [7], complexity of living systems in 2008, the relations between astronomy and civilization in 2011, the living nature of the Sun in 2017, the ancient history of the Silk Road in 2021, and life-centred economics in 2022.

=== Books ===
Grandpierre published 21 books, 7 book chapters, more than 100 science papers, over 400 popular science articles, edited some books.

He wrote the Fundamental Complexity Measures of Life and Cosmic Life Forms chapters in the book titled From Fossils to Astrobiology (2008, Springer). edited the book Astronomy and Civilization (2011, Analecta Husserliana, [6]), The Helios Theory – The Sun as a Self-Regulating System and as a Cosmic Living Organism (2018, Process Studies, Limits to Growth and the Philosophy of Life-Centred Economics. World Futures (2022, World Futures, Extending Whiteheadian Organic Cosmology to a Comprehensive Science of Nature (Chapter 2 in Process Cosmology: New Integrations in Science and Philosophy, in the new “Palgrave Perspectives in Process Philosophy”, Generalization of Quantum Theory into Biology (book chapter in Process-Philosophical Perspectives on Biology: Intuiting Life, wrote two chapters and edited “The Cosmic Life Instinct Shows the Way for the Healthy Civilization” (2023, Springer,).

He was co-editor of the book Astronomy and Civilization in the New Enlightenment (2011, Springer).

=== Important publications ===
In astrophysics he wrote an article on the variable nature of the Sun's core, which was mentioned in New Scientist as giving the best fit to explain the periodicities of terrestrial Ice Ages in 2007.

Working with Katalin Martinás, he wrote on "natural" thermodynamics. Since 2020, he is the Research President of the Budapest Centre for Long-Term Sustainability.

He generalised the principle of least action, playing a fundamental role in physics, to the principle of biology as the principle of greatest action.

- Grandpierre, A. 2024, The epoch-making importance of Ervin Bauer's theoretical biology. BioSystems 238: 105179.
- Grandpierre, A. 2023a, Generalization of Quantum Theory into Biology (Process-Philosophical Perspectives on Biology: Intuiting Life, ed. Spyridon Koutroufinis. Cambridge Scholars Publishing, 149-174).
- Grandpierre, A. 2023b, The Cosmic Life Instinct Shows the Way for the Healthy Civilization. in: Towards a Philosophy of Cosmic Life - New Discussions and Interdisciplinary Views (book chapter; Springer, 35-67).
- Grandpierre, A. 2022, Limits to Growth and the Philosophy of Life-Centred Economics. World Futures, DOI: 10.1080/02604027.2022.2072160
- Grandpierre, A. 2022, Extending Whiteheadian Organic Cosmology to a Comprehensive Science of Nature (Chapter 2 in Process Cosmology: New Integrations in Science and Philosophy, in the new “Palgrave Perspectives in Process Philosophy” series, ed. Andrew M. Davis, 59-91.
- Grandpierre, A. 2021, Cosmic Roots of Human Nature and Our Culturally Conditioned Self-Image. In: International Communication of Chinese Culture. Spectra of Cultural Understanding 8: 47–63.

== Musician career ==
As a musician Atilla Grandpierre is best known as leader/vocalist of Galloping Coroners (Vágtázó Halottkémek in Hungarian, Die Rasenden Leichenbeschauer in German, where they were a cultic band in the 80’s and 90’s) shamanic band inspired by the cosmic life force, from 1975-today and later also the same of acoustic Galloping Wonder Stag from 2005-today.

By his high school years, before he had started to sing, he had countrywide fame among youngsters as a boy who did crazy things with his friends; e.g. creating homemade rockets.
