= Amon Düül =

German political art commune

- Origin: Munich, West Germany
- Genres: Krautrock; experimental rock; acid rock
- Years active: 1967–1971, 1980–1989
- Spinoffs: Amon Düül II; Amon Düül UK
- Past members: Eleonora Romana Bauer; Rainer Bauer; Klaus Esser; Angelika Filanda; Helge Filanda; Hansi Fischer; Wolfgang Krischke; Peter Leopold; Ulrich Leopold; Uschi Obermaier; Christian Thiele; John Weinzierl

Amon Düül was a West German political art commune formed out of the student movement of the 1960s that became well known for its free-form musical improvisations. This spawned two rock groups: Amon Düül (sometimes referred to as Amon Düül I) and the more famous Amon Düül II. After both groups disbanded in the 1970s, some of the original members reunited in the 1980s under the name Amon Düül again, though this incarnation is commonly referred to as Amon Düül UK to avoid confusion with earlier versions of the band.

== Origins ==
Amon Düül began in 1967 as a radical political art commune of Munich-based artists calling themselves, in part, after the Egyptian Sun God Amon. The word Düül originally had no intended meaning.

Led by Ulrich Leopold, Amon Düül included Ulrich's brother Peter Leopold (15 August 1945 – 8 November 2006), together with Austrian Rainer Bauer and Chris Karrer on guitars. Later, the commune would add Bauer's sister Ella, Helge and Angelika Filanda, Uschi Obermaier, Wolfgang Krischke, Falk Rogner and Renate Knaup. The commune attained underground popularity for its free-form musical improvisations, performed around the happenings and demonstrations of the youth movement at the time. The commune had a liberal attitude to artistic freedom, valuing enthusiasm and attitude over artistic ability, and as a result, band membership was fluid; anyone who was part of the commune could be part of the group. They issued a declaration: "We are eleven adults and two children which are gathered to make all kinds of expressions, also musical." A faction within the commune was more ambitious, conventional and musically structured than the commune society overall. This led to a split within the collective, and in September 1968 they performed at the Internationale Essener Songtage—Germany's first underground festival—as two groups, "Amon Düül" and "Amon Düül II", at the suggestion of drummer Peter Leopold.

The members were close to Kommune 1 in Berlin and boasted, for a time, a prominent member in the model and activist Uschi Obermaier. Amon Düül signed a contract with the firm Metronome Records, and continued for seven years with varying degrees of success and in various guises. They wound down in 1973 after releasing four official albums (and a posthumous fifth), though all except one were recorded at the 1968 sessions for their debut. Apparently, the man responsible was producer Peter Meisel, who released the albums without the band's approval in an attempt to capitalise on the success of Amon Düül II. The LPs are these days regarded as unique, if unessential, records in the history of German rock. In contrast, their Paradieswärts Düül album featured a pastoral, folk-influenced sound (produced by Julius Schittenhelm). The name Amon Düül was trademarked by Chris Karrer and Peter Leopold of Amon Düül II, meaning that re-issues of Amon Düül's albums had to license the name from them.

== Band members ==
Four of the band's five album releases consist of jam sessions recorded in late 1968 or early 1969. The musicians credited on these sessions are:

- Rainer Bauer – guitar, vocals
- Ulrich (Uli) Leopold – bass
- Helge Filanda – congas, vocals, anvil, percussion
- Wolfgang Krischke – percussion, piano
- Eleonora Romana (Ella) Bauer – shaker, vocals, percussion
- Angelika Filanda – percussion, vocals
- Peter Leopold – drums
- Uschi Obermaier – maracas, percussion

Peter Leopold joined Amon Düül II in time for their 1969 debut album; Wolfgang Krischke died around 1969, freezing to death while under the influence of LSD; and Uschi Obermaier moved on to Munich's Highfisch-Kommune (scene of Peter Green's notorious LSD experience) and Berlin's Kommune 1. Guitarist Klaus Esser then joined the band line-up in time for the "Eternal Flow" / "Paramechanical World" single recorded in June 1970:

- Ulrich Leopold – bass, vocals, guitar, trumpet, drums
- Rainer Bauer – guitar, vocals, bass
- Klaus Esser – guitar, vocals, bass, drums
- Helge Filanda – drums, vocals, guitar
- Angelika Filanda – flute, vocals
- Ella Bauer – harp, vocals

Rainer Bauer and Ulrich Leopold were guest musicians on one track on the Amon Düül II album Yeti released 1970, which also featured a photo of the deceased Wolfgang Krischke dressed as 'Der Schnitter' (The Harvester) or 'Der Sensenmann' (The Grim Reaper) on the album cover. On the band's final recording, Paradieswärts Düül (recorded in November and December 1970), the band were:

- Ella Bauer – harp, vocals, bongos
- Lemur (Klaus Esser) – drums, vocals, rhythm and fuzz guitars
- Ulrich Leopold – bass, vocals, piano, guitar
- Dadam (Rainer Bauer) – guitar, vocals, lyrics, bass
- Helge Filanda – drums
- Noam (Angelika Filanda) – African drums

with guests:

- Hansi Fischer (from Xhol) – flute, bongos
- John Weinzierl (from Amon Düül II) – guitar
- Christian 'Shrat' Thiele (from Amon Düül II) – bongos

== Amon Düül II and Amon Düül UK ==
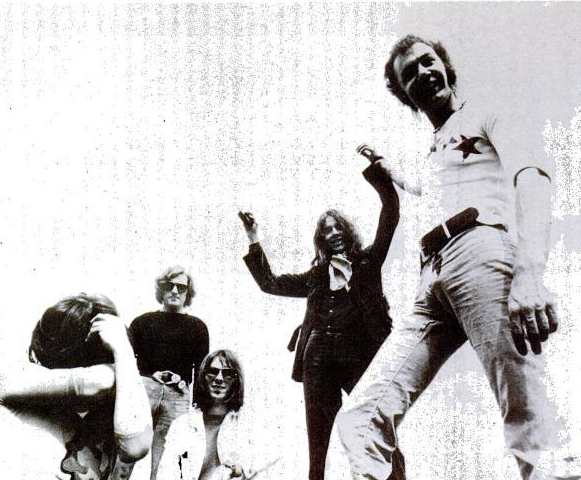
Amon Düül II, c. 1972

Amon Düül II were formed by the more professionally and technically inclined members of the original collective, with core members Chris Karrer, Falk Rogner, Renate Knaup-Kroetenschwanz, John Weinzierl, and Peter Leopold. They signed to the United Artists label and released a string of highly regarded albums with strong psychedelic and progressive flourishes. After 1975, the band changed labels and moved towards more accessible music, before finally disbanding in the late 1970s.

After a spell with Hawkwind, Amon Düül II's original bassist Dave Anderson formed a short-lived band called Amon Din with drummer John Lingwood, ex-Hawkwind guitarist Huw Lloyd-Langton and John Butler in 1971–2.

At the beginning of the 1980s, Amon Düül II's John Weinzierl, with Dave Anderson and various others, began releasing albums as Amon Düül, though this band is commonly called Amon Düül UK to differentiate it from the original one. Between 1982 and 1989, they released five albums.

When the 1990s brought new exposure and audiences to the original krautrock groups, Chris, Renate, Falk and John reunited and continue to perform as Amon Düül II sporadically.

== Legacy ==
Amon Düül and Amon Düül II influenced such bands in the late '70s as Hungarian psychedelic hardcore, 'shaman punk' band Galloping Coroners.

== Discography ==
=== Amon Düül ===
- Psychedelic Underground (1969, re-issued as Minnelied in 1979)
- Collapsing/Singvögel Rückwärts & Co. (1969)
- Paradieswärts Düül (1970)
- Disaster (Double LP) (1972)
- Experimente (Double LP) (1983)

== See also ==
- Amon Düül II discography
- Amon Düül UK discography
