= Hijack (Amon Düül II album) =

Studio album by Amon Düül II
- Released: 1974
- Genre: Krautrock
- Length: 45:27
- Producer: Wild Willy, Amon Düül II

Amon Düül II chronology
Vive La Trance (1973)	Hijack (1974)	Made in Germany (1975)

Professional ratings
Review scores
Source	Rating
Allmusic	2.5/5 stars

Hijack is the eighth studio album by Amon Düül II. It was released in 1974 by Atlantic Records. It was distributed in the UK by WEA Records.

== Track listing ==
No.	Title	Writer(s)	Length
1.	"I Can't Wait (Parts 1 & 2)"	Meid	06:16
2.	"Mirror"	Weinzierl	04:15
3.	"Traveller"	Weinzierl, Knaup, Rogner	04:23
4.	"You're Not Alone"	Meid	06:53
5.	"Explode Like a Star"	Karrer	04:00
6.	"Da Guadeloop"	Meid, Leopold	07:04
7.	"Lonely Woman"	Ornette Coleman, Karrer	04:44
8.	"Liquid Whisper"	Leopold, Knaup, Rogner	03:30
9.	"Archy the Robot"	Karrer	03:30

== Personnel ==
Amon Düül II

- Renate Knaup — vocals
- Chris Karrer — guitars, violin, vocals, tenor saxophone
- John Weinzierl — guitars
- Falk Rogner – synthesizer
- Lothar Meid — bass, guitar, vocals, string arrangements
- Peter Leopold - drums, percussion, acoustic guitar

Additional Personnel

- Chris Balder — strings
- Ludwig Popp — French horn
- Lee Harper — trumpet
- Bob Chatwin — trumpet
- Bobby Jones — saxophone
- Rudy Nagora — saxophone
- Thor Baldursson — keyboards
- Olaf Kubler — flute, soprano saxophone
- Herman Jalowitzki — marching drum
- Wild Willy — accordion, percussion, vocals
