= Amon Düül UK =

British band

Amon Düül (UK) was the British splinter of the German krautrock band Amon Düül II that was active during the 1980s. The band released four original studio albums during their career, and one compilation. The band was initially named Amon Düül II, then Amon Düül – the (UK) designation was later added by fans to differentiate this lineup from the earlier one.

Guitarist John Weinzerl and bassist Dave Anderson, both former members of Amon Düül II, formed the band in Wales in 1981. They were joined by drummer Guy Evans from the British progressive rock band Van der Graaf Generator and vocalist Julie Wareing.

Four Amon Düül (UK) releases have been remastered and reissued as of August 2008.

== Discography ==
Studio albums

- Hawk Meets Penguin (as Amon Duul II, 1982)
- Meetings With Menmachines – Inglorious Heroes of the Past... (as Amon Düül II, 1983)
- Die Lösung (with Robert Calvert, as Amon Düül) (1989)
- Fool Moon (as Amon Düül, 1989)

Compilation

- Airs on a Shoe String (as Amon Duul, 1987, compilation)
