= Tanz der Lemminge =

Studio album by Amon Düül II
- Released: March 1971
- Genres: Krautrock; progressive rock; psychedelic folk; psychedelic rock; avant-garde; space rock
- Length: 68:28
- Label: United Artists

Amon Düül II chronology
Yeti (1970)	Tanz der Lemminge (1971)	Carnival in Babylon (1972)

Professional ratings
Review scores
Source	Rating
Allmusic	4.5/5 stars
Pitchfork Media	8.8/10

Tanz der Lemminge (English: Dance of the Lemmings) is a double LP by the German rock band Amon Düül II which was released in 1971. It is their third studio album.

In the Q and Mojo Classic Special Edition Pink Floyd & The Story of Prog Rock, the album was listed as number 36 in its list of "40 Cosmic Rock Albums".

== Track listing ==
=== Side A ===
"SYNTELMAN'S MARCH OF THE ROARING SEVENTIES" – 15:51

No.	Title	Writer(s)	Length
1.	"In the Glass Garden"	Chris Karrer	1:39
2.	"Pull Down Your Mask"	Karrer, Falk Rogner	4:39
3.	"Prayer to the Silence"	Karrer	1:04
4.	"Telephonecomplex"	Karrer	8:26

=== Side B ===
"RESTLESS SKYLIGHT-TRANSISTOR-CHILD" – 19:33

No.	Title	Writer(s)	Length
5.	"Landing in a Ditch"	John Weinzierl	1:12
6.	"Dehypnotized Toothpaste"	Weinzierl	0:52
7.	"A Short Stop at the Transylvanian Brain-Surgery"	Weinzierl, Rogner, Lothar Meid	5:00
8.	"Race from Here to Your Ears (a) Little Tornadoes"	Weinzierl, Rogner	2:08
9.	"Race from Here to Your Ears (b) Overheated Tiara"	Weinzierl	1:46
10.	"Race from Here to Your Ears (c) The Flyweighted Five"	Weinzierl	1:26
11.	"Riding on a Cloud"	Weinzierl	2:33
12.	"Paralyzed Paradise"	Weinzierl	3:07
13.	"H.G. Wells' Take Off"	Weinzierl	1:26

=== Side C ===
"CHAMSIN SOUNDTRACK" - 18:05

No.	Title	Writer(s)	Length
14.	"The Marilyn Monroe-Memorial-Church"	Karrer, Weinzierl, Meid, Rogner	18:05

=== Side D ===
"CHAMSIN SOUNDTRACK"- 14:59

No.	Title	Writer(s)	Length
15.	"Chewing Gum Telegram"	Karrer, Weinzierl, Meid, Rogner	2:41
16.	"Stumbling Over Melted Moonlight"	Karrer, Weinzierl, Meid, Rogner	4:33
17.	"Toxicological Whispering"	Karrer, Weinzierl, Meid, Rogner	7:45

== Personnel ==
=== Amon Düül II ===
- Chris Karrer – acoustic guitar, electric guitar, violin, vocals on "Pull Down Your Mask" and "Little Tornadoes"
- John Weinzierl – guitars, vocals on "Paralyzed Paradise", piano (sides C & D)
- Falk Rogner – organ & electronics (sides C & D)
- Lothar Meid – bass, double-bass (sides A & B), vocals on "A Short Stop at the Transylvanian Brain-Surgery" and "Riding on a Cloud"
- Peter Leopold – drums, percussion (sides A & B), piano (sides C & D)
- Karl-Heinz Hausmann – electronics & sound engineer (sides A & B), mix & remix (sides C & D)

=== Guests ===
- Jimmy Jackson – organ, choir-organ, piano (sides A & B)
- Al Gromer – sitar (sides A & B)
- Renate Knaup-Krötenschwanz – vocals on "Riding on a Cloud" *
- Rolf Zacher – vocals on "H.G. Wells' Take Off"

(•) Renate Knaup was previously a band member, but listed as a guest for this album; she returned as a full member on the next album.

=== Technical ===
- Olaf Kübler – producer
- Peter Kramper – engineer
- Jürgen Kopper – remix engineer
