= Roman Bunka =

German instrumentalist and composer (1951–2022)

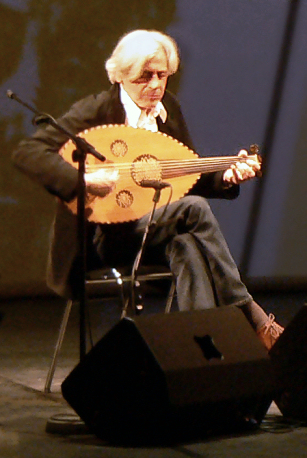
- Bunka with Dissidenten in 2012
- Born: 2 December 1951; Frankfurt, Hesse, West Germany
- Died: 12 June 2022 (aged 70); Munich, Bavaria, Germany
- Occupations: Guitarist; oud player; composer

Roman Bunka (2 December 1951 – 12 June 2022) was a German guitarist, oud player and composer, active in world music and jazz fusion bands. He lived most of his life in Munich, Bavaria, where he was involved in various musical crossover projects.

== Career ==
Bunka was born in Frankfurt on 2 December 1951. He started playing the guitar as a teenager. In the 1970s, he moved to Munich and joined the world music group Embryo. They toured in Morocco, India and Afghanistan, and the music of these countries made a strong impact on Bunka and his fellow musicians. In 1979, Embryo traveled overland to India with three buses and their instruments. The tour was documented in the movie Vagabunden Karawane.

Besides the guitar, his second instrument was the Arabic oud, which he studied mainly in Egypt. Having spent long periods of time there, he often played in the band of Egyptian singer and movie actor Mohamed Mounir, for example at the New Year's Eve concert in 2000 at the Pyramids of Giza.

In 1994, Bunka presented his ethno jazz project Color me Cairo, featuring Malachi Favors of Art Ensemble of Chicago, and Egyptian musicians Fathy Salama, Hosam Shakir and Khaled Goma at the Berlin Jazz Festival, curated by George Gruntz. The same line-up was recorded by Enja Records, with Rolling Stone magazine writing: "Bunka gets fame in a growing musical diaspora as 'best oud-player north of Mekka'."

Bunka was known for his artistic collaboration with German and international musicians, such as the German world music groups Embryo, Dissidenten and Jisr, but also with jazz musicians Mal Waldron, Charlie Mariano and Malachi Favors, as well as with Indian and Egyptian performers Trilok Gurtu, Ramesh Shotham, Fathy Salama and others. German music critic Ralf Dombrowski wrote about Bunka's 2004 record Orientación with fellow musicians Luis Borda and Jost Heckler: "He is one of the first European musicians who dared to seriously explore the oud and liberated it from exoticism and Orientalism."

During his 50-year career, Bunka recorded and played concerts with numerous musical groups, and also composed soundtracks for movies. A few weeks before his death, he played with the Munich-based group Jisr (Arabic for 'bridge') at concerts in Pakistan, Sri Lanka, India and Bangladesh. Bunka died of cancer on 12 June 2022, in Munich at the age of 70, with both Egyptian and German newspapers publishing obituaries.

== Awards ==
- 1993 BBC Prix Futura for his production of the radio play Tunguska Guska by Grace Yoon, Sainkho Namtchylak, Iris Disse
- 1995 German Critics Poll Winner for Color me Cairo with Malachi Favors and Egyptian musicians
- 2014 Schwabing Art Prize

== Discography ==
- 1973 Steig Aus (also released as: This Is Embryo)
- 1973 We Keep On with Embryo
- 1975 Surfin with Embryo
- 1976 Bad Heads and Bad Cats with Embryo and Charlie Mariano
- 1977 Apo-Calypso with Embryo
- 1979 Aera Live with Locko Richter, Klaus Kreuzeder, Lutz Oldemeier, Helmut Meier-Limberg, Freddy Setz
- 1980 Reise (CD) with Embryo (Schneeball)
- 1980 Dein Kopf ist ein schlafendes Auto
- 1990 Germanistan with Dissidenten
- 1993 The Jungle Book with Dissidenten (Exil)
- 1995 Color Me Cairo with Malachi Favors and Fathy Salama (Enja)
- 1997 Enshaallah with Rahala (united One Rec.)
- 2008 Freedom in Music with Embryo
- 2010 Embryo 40 (Trikont)

== Filmography (as composer and recording artist) ==
- 1995 Halfmoon, by Frieder Schlaich, based on short stories by Paul Bowles
- 1998 Am I Beautiful? (Bin ich schön?) by Doris Dörrie
