= Yeti (album) =

Studio album by Amon Düül II
- Released: April 1970
- Genre: Krautrock; progressive rock; psychedelic rock; avant-garde; raga rock
- Length: 67:49
- Label: Liberty/Repertoire
- Producer: Olaf Kübler, Amon Düül II

Amon Düül II chronology
Phallus Dei (1969)	Yeti (1970)	Tanz der Lemminge (1971)

Singles from Yeti
- 1. "Archangels Thunderbird / Soap Shop Rock" Released: 1970

Yeti is the second studio album by German rock band Amon Düül II, first released in April 1970 on Liberty (Germany: LBS 83359/60 X; United Kingdom: LSP 101) as a double LP. The album was produced by Olaf Kübler and Amon Düül II, and engineered by Willy Schmidt, "with a little help of Siegfried E. Loch". Including both short songs and longer, improvisational tracks, British avant-garde music magazine The Wire describes Yeti as "one of the cornerstones of both Amon Düül's career and the entire Krautrock movement".

== Cover art ==
The cover was designed by the band's organist, Falk Rogner, and features a collage depicting the Grim Reaper (German: Der Sensenmann), made from a photograph of Wolfgang Krischke. Krischke, who had worked with the band as a sound man, had died of hypothermia while under the effects of LSD. Rogner said: "When he died I thought that the photo would be a perfect tribute to his memory. He never managed to find his way into Amon Düül properly when he was alive, so maybe his image as 'Der Sensenmann' will work as a strange cover image and he could be remembered as a magical person."

Part of the cover has been used on the cover of Julian Cope's book Krautrocksampler which provides a personal account of the underground music scene in Germany from 1968 through the 1970s.

== Reception ==
Professional ratings
Review scores
Source	Rating
Allmusic	4.5/5 stars

In 2015 Yeti was chosen by Rolling Stone as the 41st greatest progressive rock album of all time. Dan Epstein described it as "one of the finest records of the entire original psychedelic era."

== Track listing ==
All tracks are written by Amon Düül II, unless noted

Side A
No.	Title	Length
1.	"Soap Shop Rock": "Burning Sister"; "Halluzination Guillotine"; "Gulp a Sonata"; "Flesh-Coloured Anti-Aircraft Alarm"	13:45: 3:45; 3:10; 0:46; 6:04
2.	"She Came Through the Chimney"	2:57
Total length:		16:42

Side B
No.	Title	Writer(s)	Length
3.	"Archangels Thunderbird"	Amon Düül II, Siegfried Loch	3:33
4.	"Cerberus"		4:21
5.	"The Return of Rübezahl"		1:41
6.	"Eye-Shaking King"		5:40
7.	"Pale Gallery"		2:12
Total length:			17:27

Side C
No.	Title	Length
8.	"Yeti (Improvisation)"	18:09
Total length:		18:09

Side D
No.	Title	Length
9.	"Yeti Talks to Yogi (Improvisation)"	6:18
10.	"Sandoz in the Rain (Improvisation)"	8:59
Total length:		15:17 67:35

The 2001 CD reissue on Repertoire Records includes all the above on a single CD, together with two bonus tracks which were originally the A and B-sides of a 1970 single:

Bonus Tracks
No.	Title	Writer(s)	Length
11.	"Rattlesnakeplumcake"	John Weinzierl, Falk Rogner	3:18
12.	"Between the Eyes"	Chris Karrer, Weinzierl, Rogner, Lothar Meid	2:27
Total length:			73:20

== Personnel ==
- Peter Leopold – drums
- Christian "Shrat" Thierfeld – bongos, vocals
- Renate Knaup – vocals, tambourine
- John Weinzierl – guitar, 12 string guitar, vocals
- Chris Karrer – violin, guitar, 12 string guitar, vocals
- Falk Rogner – organ
- Dave Anderson – bass

Guests on "Sandoz in the Rain":

- Rainer Bauer (from Amon Düül I) – guitar, vocals
- Ulrich Leopold (from Amon Düül I) – bass
- Thomas Keyserling (also recorded with Tangerine Dream) – flute
