= Amon Düül II =

German rock band

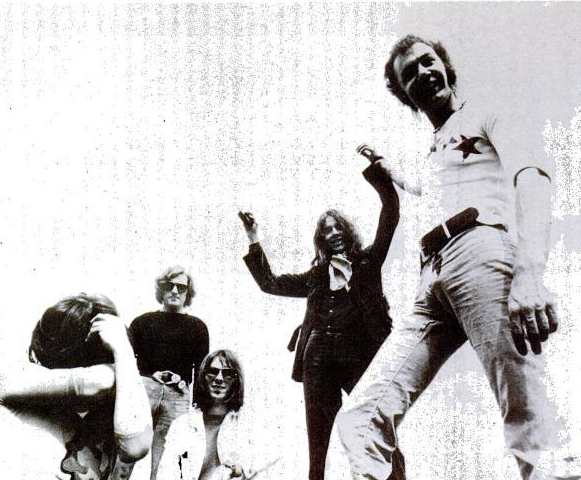
- Amon Düül II, c. 1972

Background information
- Origin: Munich, Bavaria, Germany
- Genres: Krautrock; progressive rock; psychedelic rock; space rock; experimental rock
- Years active: 1968–1981; 1995; 2010–present
- Labels: Liberty; Repertoire; United Artists; Atlantic
- Spinoff of: Amon Düül

Amon Düül II (or Amon Düül 2, Pronunciation: Amon Düül) are a German rock band formed in 1968. The group is generally considered to be one of the pioneers of the West German krautrock scene. Their 1970 album Yeti was described by British magazine The Wire as "one of the cornerstones of ... the entire Krautrock movement".

Amon Düül II emerged from the radical West German Amon Düül art commune in Munich. The band's first album, Phallus Dei, was released in 1969. Amon Düül II received offers to write music for films and won a German film award, the Deutscher Filmpreis, for their contribution to the 1970 film San Domingo.

== History ==
The band emerged from the radical West German commune scene of the late 1960s, with others in the same commune including some of the future founders of the Red Army Faction. Founding members are Chris Karrer, Dieter Serfas, Falk Rogner (born 14 September 1943), John Weinzierl (born 4 April 1949), and Renate Knaup-Krötenschwanz (born Renate Aschauer-Knaup, 1 July 1948) who, thus far, is the only woman in the band.

The band was founded after Weinzierl and the others met at the Amon Düül 'art commune' in Munich. The commune consisted mainly of university students, who formed a music group initially to fund the commune, with everyone who lived there joining in to play music whether or not they had any experience or ability. The commune split when they were offered an opportunity to record, which was boycotted by the more musically proficient members of the commune (who went on to form Amon Düül II). Recordings were made by the other members but were of very poor quality and were only released later (under the name Amon Düül) to capitalise on the success of Amon Düül II's albums. As Amon Düül II grew and personnel changed, they still remained a commune, living together as a band.

Their first album Phallus Dei ('God's Phallus'), released in 1969, consisted of pieces drawn from the group's live set at the time. By this time the line-up was built around a core of Karrer (mainly violin and guitar), Weinzierl (guitar, bass, piano), Rogner on keyboards, bass player Dave Anderson, and two drummers: Peter Leopold (born 15 August 1945), who had joined the group from Berlin, and Dieter Serfas. Renate Knaup at this point was only contributing minimal vocals but was very much part of the group. According to Weinzierl by this time "The band played almost every day. We played universities, academies, underground clubs, and every hall with a power socket and an audience". Releasing an album brought the group greater prominence and they began to tour more widely in Germany and abroad, playing alongside groups such as Tangerine Dream, and in Germany staying in other communes including the pioneering Kommune 1 in Berlin.

Their second album Yeti (1970) saw them introducing arranged compositions along with the bluesy violin and guitar jams such as the long improvised title track. The next album Tanz der Lemminge (1971) was based on four extended progressive rock suites. By this time bassist Anderson had returned to England and joined Hawkwind, to be replaced by Lothar Meid (born 28 August 1942), and the group was augmented by synthman Karl-Heinz Hausmann (Karrer had formed a short-lived group in 1966 – supposedly named 'Amon Düül O' – with future Embryo founders Lothar Meid and drummer Christian Burchard).

Still touring widely, they recorded their Live in London album in late 1972 and in 1975 signed with Atlantic Records in the US, and United Artists Records Germany and initially disbanded in 1981.

As well as their albums and live shows ADII received offers to write music for films, winning a German film award, the Deutscher Filmpreis, for their contribution to the film San Domingo.

Amon Düül II's drummer, Peter Leopold, died on 8 November 2006. A memorial service was held for Leopold in Munich, where the remaining members of Amon Düül II sang a song for him. Leopold was replaced by multi-instrumentalist Daniel Fichelscher, for many years guitarist and drummer of Krautrock group Popol Vuh. Fichelscher is not new to the group, and in fact has had a long affiliation with Amon Düül II, having played with them as early as 1972 on Carnival in Babylon.

Bass player Lothar Meid died on 3 November 2015.

== Band members ==
=== Current members ===
- John Weinzierl – guitar, bass, vocals, synthesizer (1969–1977, c. 2010–present)
- Renate Knaup – vocals, tambourine (1969–1970, 1972–1975, 1981, 1994–present)
- Dieter Serfas – drums (1969, c. 2018–present)
- Danny Fichelscher – drums, percussion, guitar, vocals (1972, 1981, 2006–present)
- Jan Kahlert – percussion, vocals, guitar (1995–1996, 2006–present)
- "Dario" – bass (c. 2018–present)
- Ulli Linzen – keyboards, percussion (c. 2018–present)

=== Former members ===
- Chris Karrer – violin, guitars, saxophone, oud, vocals (1969–1981, 1994–2024; died 2024)
- Falk Rogner – organ, synthesizer, electronics (1969–1971, 1972–1975, 1981)
- Peter Leopold – drums, percussion (1969–1972, 1973–1979, 1994–1995, 1997–2006; died 2006)
- Christian "Shrat" Thiele – bongos, vocals, violin (1969–1970)
- Dave Anderson – bass (1969–1970)
- Lothar Meid – bass, vocals, synthesizer (1971–1973, 1974, 1994–2010; died 2015)
- Karl-Heinz Hausmann – keyboards, organ, electronics (1971–1972)
- Robby Heibl – bass, guitar, violin, vocals (1973, 1975)
- Nando Tischer – guitar, vocals (1975)
- Klaus Ebert – guitar, bass, vocals (1976–1979)
- Stefan Zauner – keyboards, synthesizer, vocals (1976–1979, 1981)
- Jörg Evers – bass, guitar, synthesizer (1981)
- Felix Occhionero – guitar (1994–c. 1996)
- Wolf Wolff – drums (c. 1996)
- Michael Ruff – keyboards (c. 1996)
- Gerard Carbonell – bass (2010–?)

== Discography ==
Amon Düül II discography
- Studio albums: 15
- Live albums: 3
- Compilation albums: 14
- Singles: 7

=== Studio albums ===
Release year	Title	Notes
1969	Phallus Dei	
1970	Yeti	Double LP
1971	Tanz der Lemminge	Double LP; Also known as Dance of the Lemmings and in Italy as Journey into a Dream (Viaggio In Un Sogno)
1972	Carnival in Babylon	
1972	Wolf City	
1973	Utopia	Originally released as a Utopia album; being a side project by Amon Düül II producer Olaf Kübler; only re-releases credit the band as Amon Düül II. Renate Knaup, Falk-U. Rogner and Chris Karrer are featured in one song of the album each, John Weinzierl in two songs and Danny Fichelscher on four songs. Only Lothar Meid is featured on all eight songs of the album.
1973	Vive La Trance	
1974	Hijack	Also written Hi-Jack
1975	Made in Germany	Released as a double LP in Germany and a single LP outside Germany
1976	Pyragony X	
1977	Almost Alive ...	
1979	Only Human	
1981	Vortex	
1995	Nada Moonshine #	
2010 2014	Bee as Such Düülirium	Originally released online in 2010 as Bee as Such First released on CD and vinyl in 2014 as Düülirium

=== Live albums ===
Release year	Title	Notes
1973	Live in London	Recorded 16 December 1972 at The Greyhound, Croydon on the Pye Mobile Recording Unit. Remixed at Studio 70, Munich in January 1973.
1992	Live in Concert	BBC recording from 1973
1996	Live in Tokyo	

=== Compilations ===
Release year	Title	Notes
1974	Lemmingmania	
1978	Rock in Deutschland Vol. 1	
1989	Milestones	
1993	Surrounded by the Bars	
1994	The Greatest Hits	
1996	Kobe (Reconstructions)	
1996	Eternal Flashback	
1997	Flawless	
1997	The Best of 1969–1974	
1997	Drei Jahrzehnte (1968–1998)	
1999	The UA Years: 1969–1974	
2000	Manana	
2001	Once Upon a Time – Best of 1969–1999	
2005	Anthology	A complete Amon Düül II career retrospective

=== Singles ===
Release year	Title	Notes	Album
1970	"Archangels Thunderbird"	b/w "Soap Shop Rock"	Yeti
1970	"Rattlesnakeplumcake"	b/w "Between the Eyes"	Non-album single
1971	"Light"	b/w "Lemmingmania"	Non-album single
1972	"All the Years Round"	b/w "The Tables Are Turned"	Carnival in Babylon
1974	"Pigman"	b/w "Mozambique"	Vive La Trance
1974	"Mirror"	b/w "Liquid Whisper"	Hijack
1979	"Don't Turn Too Stone"	b/w "Spaniards & Spacemen"	Only Human

== Legacy ==
Amon Düül II influenced such bands in late 70s like Hungarian psychedelic hardcore 'shaman punk' band Galloping Coroners.
