= Duhulla =

Type of Arabic bass drum

The Duhulla is a type of bass drum that is commonly found in Arabic percussion. Usually, it is played along with the Tabla, Goblet drum, Darabuka, Riq (tambourine), and Daf (frame drum.) Duhulla, sometimes referred to as Doholla, or Bass Darabuka, is mostly found across the Middle East. Used mostly in festival settings, it is part of many trans-regional traditional music and dance across the Arab world. It is very similar to the Darabuka (or as known by Egyptians, the Tabla), but it is a larger version and has a deeper sound.

== Construction ==
Traditional Duhullas consist of a clay body and a drumhead that is usually derived from animal hides such as that of a goat, cow, or camel. Modern varieties are made of either ceramic or metals such as aluminium and brass and feature a tuneable plastic drumhead. Heights can range from anywhere between 8 and 19 inches tall.

== Sound ==
A Duhulla is known for its wide dynamic range. It can create both deep bass or high-pitched tones. While it can be used as a solo instrument, it is most commonly utilized as a complement to a Tabla driven ensemble.

== Cultural Uses ==
The Duhulla is used across the Arab world in regionally unique traditional music. Often it is used in an ensemble with other native Arabic musical instruments.
