= Galloping Coroners =

Hungarian rock band

Galloping Coroners Vágtázó Halottkémek
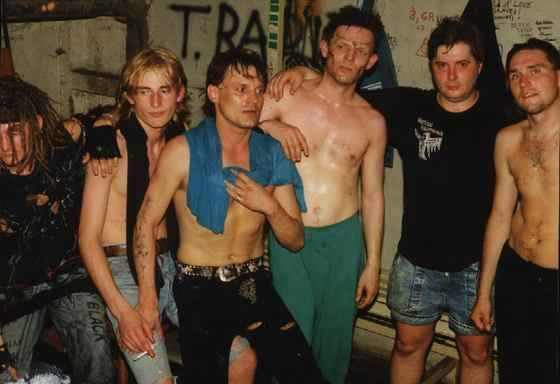
- Vágtázó Halottkémek in 1991. From left to right: Balatoni Endre, Sidoó Attila, Soós Lajos, Grandpierre Atilla, Ipacs László, Németh László

Background information
- Origin: Budapest, Hungary
- Genres: Hardcore punk; punk rock; shaman punk; psychedelic rock
- Years active: 1975–2001, 2009–present
- Members: Grandpierre Attila – singer (1975–); Soós Lajos Szónusz – bass, violin (1980–1994, 2008–); Király Zoltán – drums (2010–); Köles Vazul - timpani, vocal (2012–); Földi Tomy - guitar (2016–); Szűcs Antal Mór - guitar (2017–); Sánta Kristóf - bass (2018–)
- Past members: Czakó Sándor – guitar (1975–1990); Ipacs László – drums (1975–2001); Molnár György – guitar (1975–1980); Simon Miklós – bass (1975); Orbán Ottó – bass (1976–1980); Pócs Tamás – bass (1978–1981); Szabó István – guitar (1980–1981); Németh László Fritz – guitar (1982–2016); Árvai Viktor – timpani (1983–1986); Balatoni Endre Boli – timpani (1986–2012); Fidó Béla – guitar (1988); Balázsfalvi Gábor – guitar (1990); Sidoó Attila (Fidó) – guitar (1990–1995); Ludányi László – bass (1994–1995); Korona Levente – bass (1995–1996); Mestyán Ádám – bass (1996–2015); Molnár Lajos Lujó – guitar (1996–2017); Borsay Levente – timpani (1997); Szabó Kristóf – drums (2009–2010); Vécsi Tibor – singer (2001); Tóth Csenge - bass (2015–2018)
- Website: vhk.mediastorm.hu

Galloping Coroners (Hungarian: Vágtázó Halottkémek, [ˈvaːɡtaːzoːˈhɒlotːkeːmɛk] , also known as VHK and Rasende Leichenbeschauer) is a Hungarian original shamanic band active between 1975–2001, and since 2009. The band established a unique "shaman punk" or "psychedelic hardcore" sound, and is regarded as one of the most important alternative bands of the 1980s from the Eastern European bloc. Permanent restrictions by Hungarian authorities made worldwide tours difficult for the band, but its ecstatic concerts garnered surprising success across Western Europe. Though relatively obscure and commercially limited outside of Eastern Europe, Maximumrocknroll described the band as "equal in spirit and grit to faves like Sonic Youth or Big Black but with an identity all its own". VHK has been praised as a highly important band by Iggy Pop, Henry Rollins, Jello Biafra and Einstürzende Neubauten.

The band played repetitive, wild, yet melodic music, combining tribal shamanic music with rock guitars and drumming to form a uniquely pulsating and obsessive sound. Songs regularly feature ritualistic improvisation, and live shows were often accompanied by ecstatic on-stage actions. The New York Times described their music as "basic and elemental and filled with obsessive, galvanizing passion."

The band's musical philosophy was shaped and influenced by its frontman, Attila Grandpierre. Beginning in 2005, Grandpierre continued VHK's concept with Vágtázó Csodaszarvas on solely acoustic instruments.

== History ==
Galloping Coroners (VHK) was formed in Budapest in 1975 by Attila Grandpierre (singer) and his friends independently from Western world's punk movement that started 1–2 years later. Initial lineup: Attila Grandpierre (vocal), Sándor Czakó (guitar), László Ipacs (drums), Tamás Pócs (bass guitar), Molnár György (solo guitar). More of them were graduated professionals: The group's leader and main theoretician, Attila Grandpierre is also astrophysicist, a candidate of physical sciences, employed by the Hungarian Mathematics Institute. Guitarist Sándor Czakó is a nuclear physicist, later worked on the safety system of Paks Nuclear Power Plant, László Ipacs is a physicists, Lajos Soós is a teacher.

=== Formation ===
In early 70's, Budapest youngsters were talking stories about a mysterious, eccentric teenage boy, Attila Grandpierre, who was doing scandalous actions with his friends e.g. creating home-made rockets etc. As a physicstudent Grandpierre gave private lessons to the 5 year younger high-school student, László Ipacs. Grandpierre and Ipacs's mates become friends, and formed a subcultural creative community mainly driven by Grandpierres inconvenient visions of life and music. When Ipacs and his friend Sándor Czakó the only educated musician, formed an amateur band, Grandpierre first just helped the band with musical ideas as an external consultant. Surprisingly they won army's countrywide amateur rock contest. By that time Grandpierre as a well-known personality of Budapest underground life was invited to be singer by several amateur bands. But he was only impressed enough by the Ipacs-Czakó formation, so he joined the band in 1975. The band started to use the name Vágtázó Halottkémek (abbr.: VHK, eng.: Galloping Coroners) suggested by Grandpierre. As he remembers, he wanted a name that expresses their musical and life philosophy regarding that "people should find their way to the basic, elemental natural power of the Universe and being charged with this power should live a more perfect and active life." He felt it must be a two word band name. First, 'Galloping' tag was to express the activity, energy. The second tag took longer to find out, finally they found that 'Coroners' expresses their feeling greatly that people on Earth live on a very basic level, almost like 'living deads', and the band is like the Coroners who say the diagnosis of this state.

=== Underground years in late Hungarian communist era ===
In 1975 the band recorded their first songs. They aroused their first public acclaim among Budapest teenagers when bandmates walked along Váci Street playing VHK on cassette recorder demonstratively. VHK gave the first concert at a high-school event in 1976. The concert was stopped after 20 minutes by event supervisor singing-teacher finding the band and the audience too excited and scandalous. Fans had to wait 2 years for the next concert. In 1978 the concert again was stopped because the organizers were afraid about the allegedly 'violent consequences'. Next 6 concerts were also interrupted by the authorities. In Soviet-bloc, Goulash-communist Hungary Galloping Coroners' ecstatic music was extremely scandalous sound compared to the state-controlled music scene. Though VHK didn't play political songs, authorities were afraid of a band that seemed to have 'subversive effect on youth'. VHK soon became the No.1 banned rock band and had been officially banished within Hungary for 11 years. Members were harassed by the police, observed by the secret agent network and not allowed to release an LP and make concerts legally. So in the seventies VHK had only a few concerts, still the band continuously found ways to play underground concerts at various scenes. Vágtázó Halottkémek was helped to the stage by the fans of other bands, or there were concert-organizers taking the risk to be kicked out because of allowing them to play. They used fake names, played as guest musicians of other bands without revealing themselves as VHK at the concert. Due to these concerts, and fan-made cassette recordings VHK's fame spread rapidly among youth communities in Budapest. By the end of 70's VHK gained countrywide reputation among youth regarded as "the wildest band in Hungary". Experimental film director Gábor Bódy recognised VHK for his 1983 film "Dog's Night Song" featuring the band and lead howler Attila Grandpierre as an actor.

=== International success from 1980s ===
VHK had no LP and was forbidden to concert within Hungary, but by the 80's the band's fame reached Western Europe, first West Germany through personal channels. The band appeared in Gábor Bódy's 1983 film Dog's Night Song. West Berlin artist, author and philosopher Wolfgang Müller from the cult-band Die Tödliche Doris discovered the band through the film, and invited them to West Berlin, where they were totally unknown. The band played 1984 in Berlin-Kreuzberg Frontkino, which was already a famous underground space. Now they started to build a growing fan-base in West Germany. In 1981 the first VHK song was published on a German Ata Tak's Fix Planet compilation LP. From 1984 VHK played regularly in Western Europe, despite Hungarian authorities tried to obstruct administratively, not giving passport to VHK's members to get concerts in Western Europe. In 1986 VHK was invited to Amsterdam, that was the "Cultural Capital of Europe" in that year. Dutch Queen, Beatrix should have personally pressure Hungarian authorities to give passports and allow band's performance. In 1987 Austrian chancellor, Fred Sinowatz also had to make diplomatic steps toward the Hungarian Ministry of Culture to let VHK play in Austria. In 1982 Kristen Dehlholm avantgarde theater director and VHK-related artists founded 'VHK's Ritual Theatre' accompanying concerts with movement and sound theater elements. Thanks to this, VHK played in the Mythen, Monstren and Mutationen festival in Berlin. In 1988 Einstürzende Neubauten, Henry Rollins, Jello Biafra and Iggy Pop met VHK and all of them were impressed by VHK's obsessive performance. In the last years before the collapse of Hungarian communist soft regime, VHK played with Rollins Band in Hungary. Rollins Band invited VHK for a tour in England in 1989. In 1992 they released their 3rd LP "Hammering on the Gates of Nothingness" both in Europe and the US. LP's title song reached 2nd position on the top-list of a Belgian music radio station, and VHK were played in numerous US college radios.

First international manager of the band was Dietmar Lupfer. VHK released with him their first 3 records, Teach Death a Lesson (1988), Jump Out the World-Instinct (1990), Hammering on the Gates of Nothingness (1992) at Sonic Boom Records for Europe, while these LPs were released by Alternative Tentacles in the US. Despite Jello Biafra's offer to manage the band in the US, the band decided to leave Alternative Tentacles and produce the next LP in the US themselves, but VHK's self-promotion has failed.

=== 2001 and beyond ===
Between 2001-2009 VHK didn't give concerts. From 2005 band leader Attila Grandpierre continued VHK's musical concept in neotraditional Vágtázó Csodaszarvas ("Galloping Wonder Stag"), changing electronic instruments into traditional Hungarian acoustic folk instruments, developed a clear, modern still ancient style.

In 2009 Grandpierre renewed VHK, releasing Forgószél! ("Tornado!") LP, under "Galloping Life Power" band name. The "Coroners" tag was changed to "Life Power" to express more directly Grandpierre's fully positive life attitude, as he said. Later they started to use Galloping Coroners band name again and released Bite the Stars! LP in 2012.

Attila Grandpierre is still active nowadays, occasionally touring with Galloping Wonder Stag playing acoustic repertoire and with Galloping Coroners performing the rock-instrumental line.

== Musical style ==
In 1975 Galloping Coroners started with basic rock instruments, 3 electronic guitars and drum, enriched with a kettle drum to enhance roaming tribal sound. By the 90's VHK kept their psychedelic-shaman-punk musical ideology while their music developed to a more complex instrumentation. On 1997 Reconquering Eden I LP they used tablas, kettle drums, roto, earthen drum, acoustic guitar, reed pipe, whistle, percussion, bass, electric guitar, vocals with guests adding violin, flute, double bass, hurdy gurdy and vocals. This trend got its peak point with full acoustic performances of Galloping Wonder Stag, Grandpierre's later formation from 2005. Galloping Coroners, including their international career have sung exclusively Hungarian lyrics.

Galloping Coroners' music may best describe as "shaman punk" or "psychedelic hardcore" - new categories created by western critics in the '80s to define the original sound of the band. Historically Galloping Coroners started 1–2 years before punk movement in 1975, from independent roots. Galloping Coroners' music was mainly determined by band founder Attila Grandpierre's vision of music and the Universe. He said, he was not interested in music like western punk bands, Iggy & The Stooges and others. He was impressed by psychedelic, progressive rock music: "I liked very much early Pink Floyd, especially See Emily Play and the first Blue Cheer album, Vincebus Eruptum. The most important song for me was Out of Focus." He was also influenced by German progressive rock, especially krautrock (early Amon Düül, Popol Vuh, Ash Ra Tempel).

As Grandpierre remembers the first years "We had no idea that our music had any connection with shamanism. [...] We didn't know what had bursted out from us, our friends just said, 'it's total craziness'. [...] Our definite goal was to become the world's best band [...] we talked along many nights how to make a world revolution [...]. In the morning we started the day with bright eyes and feeling huge forces lit in us. [...] We felt, we are able to change the course of the world, and there must be a music that can move deeper powers any social movement can."

Later, when punk movement developed Galloping Coroners recognised common points with punk and hardcore, as Grandpierre expressed in his manifesto Punk As a Rebirth of Shamanist Folk Music in 1984, and VHK built connections and toured with punk and hardcore bands like Rollins Band. Some critics regarding tribal shamanic music as an ancient form of folk music suggest to use ethno punk definition and regard VHK's shaman punk as a subgenre of folk punk. But while folk punk groups include national folk elements in their punk music, VHK's repetitive, ecstatic sound with distorted guitars and inarticulated howls in vocal is much closer to hardcore or even industrial rock. In contrast with aggressive, angry, anti-establishment, direct protest features of punk and hardcore, VHK's unrestrained dynamism is rather a positive, ecstatic, sublimed and transcendent often with harmonious tones in lead vocals over the repetitive base rhythm. Their mission is to express "world instinct".

"The VHK is definitively the best from the East. The Coroners are a musical excess, a 50 minutes trance. They are insane drums, overmodulated guitars, screaming Shamans." - NMI Messitsch (Germany), 08/92

Vágtázó Halottkémek themselves describe their music as "an instinctive primeval music liberating the elementary powers of nature creating ourselves and revolting to its high completion in a free spontaneity and overwhelming energy." VHK played pre-written songs as a basis, exposed with improvisations and instinctive physical performances on stage, with an open end to a total ecstatic state "liberating the deepest musical creative power". Grandpierre said "Improvisation is not the correct word to describe our music. At our best, we are in touch with life-completing, primordial powers and our attempt is to hand over the control of our musical activities to these powers." VHK's music referred to by many as shamanistic ethno or psychedelic hardcore, Band leader Attila Grandpierre explains this as "an unrestricted outburst of life energy" that is not only a music but an attitude to grasp the essence of life with our deepest nature and let it grow by its own laws. The group says: "it is a magical folk-music, a cosmic vision about the role of earthly life on the destination of the Universe." This approach is expressed in LP titles like Jump Out the World-Instinct (1990) or Hammering on the Gates of Nothingness (1992).

"The songs of VHK are growing towards a dreamlike ecstasy coming from the heart, the usual song-structure and singing style are completely missing, the magic dance-rhythm captures and raptures the audience, which you can not find in the today's stylised neon-coolness only at the natural tribes living in other era. Permanent rhythm-accelerations, abrupt speeding-up of the almost brutal-ancient drums, amorphous collage of the head-voices, animal voice playbacks and volcanically exploding guitar riffs - all these things are completed with an unconsciousness jungle of sounds in which you get lost and cannot come back easily, since the perception of time and space is changing into completely new forms." - Zitty Berlin, fanzine, 1988, Nr. 14

"Each time I hear a new VHK record I relive this atavistic reverie - it's like reentering the womb. VHK are so improbable, so wonderful and yet so seemingly necessary (were they not to exist they would have to be invented), that they function for me like my favourite fairy tales used to when I was a kid. When I first discovered their 1988 LP "Teach Death a Lesson", I was bowled over by its combination of monastic psychedelia, rock 'n roll codpiece swagger and sheer alien abduction logical completeness, this wondering is with me yet. VHK sound like they 're from another world and another time." - Bananafish, San Francisco fanzine, 1995, No. 10

== Live performances ==
Galloping Coroners concerts were well-known for trance-fuelled ecstatic performances also involving the audience. Concerts during the first Hungarian underground period in the 70's usually ended up scandalously finally interrupted by authorities. In the 80's, VHK continued their impulsive, high-energy live performances in Western Europe:

"As the singer spins around inside the band's mesmeric voodoo howl like whirling dervish the effect is almost hypnotizing. Incredible. Watching them play in Cologne, I was fascinated, not just by the band's performance (which was amazing) but by the frenzied reaction of the crowd. Seeing VHK, I realized just what a dangerous proposition rock'n roll can be." - Melody Maker (U. K.), September 26, 1992

In concert, they regularly danced in ancient, tribal, shamanic costumes of leather and feathers, using backdrops like an Inuit design they copied from Siberian art. VHK's concerts often contained ecstatic physical performances, e.g. band members tumbled in honey and feather in an ecstatic state playing feather-covered in a frenzy during the entire concert, or hanging fishes on their bodies and jumping into a fishing net fastened on the stage. Frontman Grandpierre recalls a concert when he had been injured on stage in an ecstatic state where he continued to perform bleeding, with significant blood loss by the end of the concert.

In 2021, he will appear on the show Akusztik.

== Legacy ==
Due to the band's East-European geopolitical situation, the banned, underground status of the first 9-10 years in Hungary, the late and obstructed getting out to the Western European music market, VHK haven't reached a worldwide, global international band status. As explained in Forced Exposure "Had this [VHK] LP come in '73 in a tiny enough press run, it would be one of the most legendary 'lost' records of that decade." Critics and fellow musicians celebrated Galloping Coroners as a highly important brand of the time. Maximum Rock'N Roll (US) told the band "equal in spirit and grit to faves like Sonic Youth or Big Black but with an identity all its own". VHK is admired as highly important band by Iggy Pop, Henry Rollins, Jello Biafra (Dead Kennedys) and Einstürzende Neubauten. Danish fanzine, Moshable summarised in 1995: "This band have been around for many years now and have played almost everywhere in Europe but still they remain one of Europe's best kept secret. This is one of the most interesting bands you're likely to come across this year."

== Discography ==
- Teach Death a Lesson - LP, MC, Sonic Boom (1988), Germany, Hungary; also released by Alternative Tentacles, US, 1990 (LP, CD)
- Jumping Out The World-Instinct - live LP, MC, Sonic Boom (1990), Germany; released also by Alternative Tentacles, US, 1990 (LP, CD)
- Hammering On The Gates Of Nothingness - Sonic Boom and Alternative Tentacles, CD, LP, MC, 1992, US, Great-Britain, Germany, Hungary
- Giant Space! - live CD, MC, VHK - Rockland, Hungary, 1994
- Reconquering Eden - 1st attack, 1997 March, VHK-MCD, Hungary
- Reconquering Eden - 2nd attack, 1998 August, VHK-Periferic Records, Hungary
- Dancing with the Sun - 1999 December, Hungary/2000 /May, US, Europe, VHK-Neurot Recordings
- Whirlwind! (Forgószél!) - under 'Galloping Life Power' band name, 2009, VHK
- Bite the Stars! (Veled haraptat csillagot) – 2012, VHK, Ektro Records
- At the very Depth of the Soul (A Lélek Mélyén) Author's edition, 2016
- Lifecascade (Életzuhatag) Author's edition, 2019

== Compilations, demos ==
- Fix Planet - A track on a compilation LP, An international record. ATATAK, Düsseldorf, 1981
- Galloping Coroners - demo tape, 1985, Budapest
- Siberian Shamans/Galloping Coroners - cassette tape, Center for Shamanic Studies, 1987, Mill Valley, California, US
- Mind-deepening, poem with musical action, published on tape, Solidart-Minifest, Talentum, Szkárosy Endre &ÚHF, Budapest, 1990
- Garage III, Magyar Rock (Hungarian Rock) - compilation tape, No. MK 014, Rockland, Hungary, 1992
- The Futility of a Well Ordered Life - A Catalogue Sampler. Virus 147CD, US.

== Bibliography ==
1. Contemplating the Heavens with VHK's Atilla Grandpierre, by Jordan N. Mamone, at www.vice.com, 2013.
2. Rock Music of Eastern Europe: So Western, So Familiar, So Old, by Jon Pareles, New York Times, February 28, 1990.
3. Short Biography, VÁGTÁZÓ HALOTTKÉMEK/VHK (cca. Galloping Coroners, Rasende Leichenbeschauer), Neurot Recordings, US pdf >>
4. Attila Grandpierre: Punk As a Rebirth of Shamanist Folk Music
5. Documentary film: VHK - The Ones Who Taught Death a Lesson, 2012
6. Documentary film: VHK - The Ones Who Taught Death a Lesson, 2012 imdb.com
7. Archie Patterson: Interview with Attila Grandpierre, Eurock.com
8. Anna Szemere: Up from the Underground: The Culture of Rock Music in Postsocialist Hungary, The Pennsylvania State University Press, University Park, 2001.
9. Edwin Pouncy: VHK: Hammering On The Gates Of Nothingness (Alternative Tentacles) The New Musical Express, 22 August 1992
10. Kathryn Milun: Rock Music and National Identity in Hungary, Surface, 24 pp, 1992, internet: www.pum.umontreal.ca
11. A Punkrock Összefüggései a Sámán-zenével Mint Népzenével: A Művészet Mágikus Erőinek Hatásmechanizmusa, (1984) in Jó Világ ed. Beke and Szöke, Bölcsész Index, Budapest, Elte Btk pp. 91–97.
12. Documentary film: Private Rock History / 47. - Vágtázó Halottkémek - VHK, ed. Gábor Gellért, 2009
13. ed. Reebee Garofalo: Rockin' the Boat: Mass Music and Mass Movements, chapter: Anna Szemere: Hungarian protest rock, South End Press, 1991
