= San Domingo (film) =

- Directed by: Hans-Jürgen Syberberg
- Screenplay by: Hans-Jürgen Syberberg
- Based on: Betrothal in St. Domingo by Heinrich von Kleist
- Produced by: Hans Jürgen Syberberg
- Cinematography: Christian Blackwood
- Edited by: Ingrid Fischer
- Music by: Amon Düül II
- Production company: TMS Film GmbH
- Release date: 10 November 1970
- Running time: 138 minutes
- Country: West Germany
- Language: German

San Domingo is a 1970 West German drama film directed by Hans-Jürgen Syberberg. It tells the story of a man who joins a rock music hippie commune. When the commune members learn that his family is wealthy, they tell his parents that he has been kidnapped and demand a ransom. The film is loosely based on the story Betrothal in St. Domingo by Heinrich von Kleist. The actors are primarily non-professionals. The film received the 1971 Deutscher Filmpreis for Best Cinematography and Best Music.

== Cast ==
- Michael König as Michi
- Alice Ottawa as Alice
- Wolfgang Haas as Hasi
- Hans-Georg Behr as Schorschi, poet and drug dealer
- Carla Egerer as Michi's mother (as Carla Aulaulu)
- Peter Moland as Michi's father
