= Shamanic music =

Ritualistic music genre

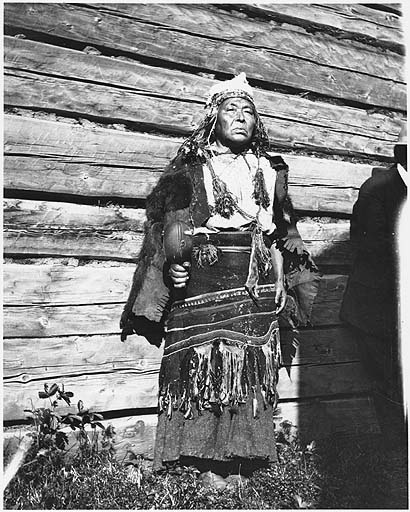
Gitksan shaman with rattle

Shamanic music is ritualistic music used in religious and spiritual ceremonies associated with the practice of shamanism. Shamanic music makes use of various means of producing music, with an emphasis on voice and rhythm. It can vary based on cultural, geographic, and religious influences.

Recently in Siberia, music groups drawing on knowledge of shamanic culture have emerged. In the West, shamanism has served as an imagined background to music meant to alter a listener's state of mind. Korea and Tibet are two cultures where the music of shamanic rituals has interacted closely with other traditions.

In shamanism, the shaman has a more active musical role than the medium in spirit possession.

== Shamanic and musical performance ==
Since a Shamanic ritual includes a spiritual purpose and motive, it cannot be regarded as a musical performance, even though shamans use music (singing, drumming, and other instruments) in their rituals. Several things follow the ritual. First, a shamanic ritual performance is, above all, a series of actions and not a series of musical sounds. Second, the shaman's attention is directed inwards towards her or his visualization of the spirit world and communication with the spirits, and not outwards to any listeners who might be present. Third, it is important for the success of the ritual that it be given its own clearly defined context that is quite different from any kind of entertainment. Fourth, any theatrical elements that are added to impress an audience are of a type to make the contact with the spirits seem more real and not to suggest the performer's musical virtuosity. From a musical perspective, shamanic ritual performances have the distinctive feature of discontinuity. Breaks may happen because a spirit is proving difficult to communicate with, or the shaman needs to call a different spirit. Typically, phases of the performance are broken off abruptly, perhaps to be restarted after a gap, perhaps not. The rhythmic dimension of the music of shamans' rituals has been connected to the idea of both incorporating the rhythms of nature and magically re-articulating them.

== Shamanism and possession ==
It has been argued that shamanism and spirit possession involve contrasting kinds of special states of mind. The shaman actively enters the spirit world, negotiates with her or his helper spirit and then with other spirits as necessary, and moves between different territories of the spirit world. The possessed medium, on the other hand, is the passive recipient of a powerful spirit or god. This reflects the different uses of music involved. Possession music is typically longer in duration, mesmeric, loud, and intense, with climaxes of rhythmic intensity and volume to which the medium has learned to respond by entering a trance state: the music is not played by the medium but by one or more musicians. In shamanism, the music is played by the shaman, confirms the shaman's power (in the words of the shaman's song), and is used actively by the shaman to modulate movements and changes of state as part of an active journey within the spirit world. In both cases, the connection between music and an altered state of mind depends on both psychoacoustic and cultural factors, and the music cannot be said to 'cause' trance-states.

== Use of sounds ==
Sound is tactile; whereas visual information is experienced at the surface, auditory information seems to be both outside and inside the body. In oral cultures in which survival involves close contact with nature, sound often connects inner feelings to features of the natural environment. In many cases, this holds also for the music in shamanistic practice, including e.g. onomatopoeia, imitation of animal cries etc. The shaman's use of sound is to catalyze an imaginary inner environment which is experienced as a sacred space-time in which the shaman travels and encounters spirits. Sound, passing constantly between inner and outer, connects this imaginary space with the actual space of the ritual in which the shaman is moving and making ritual actions and gestures.

It has been suggested that the sound material used by the shaman constitutes a system of sounds. This idea of semiotics of the sound material would imply a symbolic language shared between the shaman and the surrounding community. However, the evidence suggests that any symbolic language elements are understood only by the shaman and perhaps by other shamans initiated by this shaman. In other words, the symbolic language, if there is one, is more likely to be shared with the spirits than with a human community.

A shaman may use different sounds for different ritual purposes:

Setting up the sound-space of the ritual
A very important element in Siberian shamanism is the use of hanging metallic objects – possibly including small bells – attached to the shaman's ritual cloak and to the inside of the drum and also sometimes to the beater. This sets up a continuously moving sound field, heard as a single complex sound. A further element is the spatialization of sound brought about not only by the shaman's movement but also by techniques of singing into the drum to create the illusion of the voice coming from elsewhere. Different individual shamans and different local traditions may use different sounds. For example, in the south of Tuva and in Mongolia the khoums, or jaw harp is commonly used in shaman sing.
Preparation
Particular sounds, like bells, may be used for purifying the place in which the ritual is to be performed. This is because a ritual involving contact with the spirits is always potentially dangerous, and one of the dangers is that of pollution.
Calling and sending back spirits
A bell may also be used for calling or sending back spirits. Shamans will also imitate the sounds of birds and animals in order to call spirits. Sami shamanic singing, called Joik, is also about summoning, for example, animal spirits, rather than singing about them or representing them: the spirit is experienced as being present.
Healing
Within shamanic ritual, sound can also be used as a healing power, conceived as a way of directing spiritual energy from the shaman into an afflicted person. In Tuva sick persons are said to have been healed by the sound of a stringed instrument made from a tree struck by lightning.

== Shaman's song ==
The shaman's song – or largish in Tuvan – is personal to the shaman and tells of her or his birthplace, initiation, ancestral pedigree, special gifts, and special connections to particular spirits. The melody and words are composed by the shaman and generally remain the same throughout the shaman's professional life. The largish is often sung near the beginning of the ritual and accompanied by drumming on the danger drum. It serves to remind the shaman of their shamanic identity and power. It proclaims the shaman's abilities and announces the shaman to the spirits. In some traditions, the shaman's song may be broken up into short sections, varied, and recombined in different performances.

== Korean shamanic music ==
Korea is the only country where shamanism appears to have been a state religion practiced by the literate classes, during the Three Kingdoms period (57 BC – 668 AD). Under successive dynasties, shamanism was gradually relegated to a popular or folk status with the arrival of Confucianism, Taoism, and Buddhism. The early official status of shamanism is the probable explanation for the fact that shamanic rituals in Korea developed highly complex and established forms. Correspondingly the music used in shamanic rituals is more elaborate in Korea than elsewhere. Furthermore, since the emergence of Korean contemporary nationalism, there has been a strong and sustained state intervention to preserve artistic traditions. All of these factors make it uniquely difficult in Korea to distinguish the 'pure' from hybrid and concert forms of shamanic ritual music. For example, Sinawi is a musical form that can be used in shamanic rituals or accompany folk dances, or for urban concert performances. In the ritual context Sinai, is often performed by a small ensemble with the change hour-glass drum and two melodic instruments, often the Taegu flute and the piri oboe. In concert the ensemble is augmented with stringed instruments Modern Sinai is played in a minor mode in 12/8 time. The role of music in Korean shamanism seems intermediary between the possession trance model and the Siberian model: in the Kut ritual, the music, played by musicians, first calls on the god to possess the mudang (shaman), then accompanies the god during their time in the shaman's body, then sends back and placates the god at the end. However, the shaman is the singer and dancer and the shaman directs the musicians.

== Bön shamanic music and Buddhist music ==
Before Buddhism came to Tibet, the local form of shamanism was Bön. Bön developed into an organised religion. When Buddhism arrived, both religions began competing with each other and incorporated many of each other's practices. The Bön shaman's drum on a pole became part of Tibetan Buddhist ritual music ensembles. Also, the shang – a kind of bell-cymbal – became incorporated into Buddhist rituals. It was formerly only used by shamans to clear away negative energy before shamanic rituals. The practice of giving a sonorous identity to deities, of calling them and sending them back by means of sounds, may well have entered Tibetan Buddhist ritual from Bön tradition.

== Adoption by popular music ==
From the late 1980s with the loosening up of political restrictions several of Siberian native cultures underwent a cultural renaissance, shamans began to practice openly again, and musicians formed bands drawing on shamanic traditions. Cholbon and AiTal, in Sakha/Yakutsk, Biosyntes and early Yat-Kha in Tuva fall into this category. Nevertheless, the musicians involved, if sometimes unsure of their exact role, recognised an important difference between artists using shamanic themes and shamans themselves. In the West, bands began to apply the label 'shamanic' loosely to any music that might induce a trance state. This was partly due to the rarity of actual recordings of shamans' rituals. Meanwhile, the British-Tuvan group K-Space developed ways of combining improvisation, electronics, and experimental recording and montage techniques with the more shamanic side of Tuvan traditional music. In Hungary Vágtázó Halottkémek(in English: Galloping Coroners) later Vágtázó Csodaszarvas set out under the banner of shamanpunk to use ethnographic materials as manuals on how to reach and communicate ecstatic states. From 2005 Vágtázó Csodaszarvas (Galloping Wonder Stag) continued Vágtázó Halottkémek music philosophy turning it into a neotraditional music style closer to world music, replacing electronic guitars and drums with acoustic folk instruments.

== Discography ==
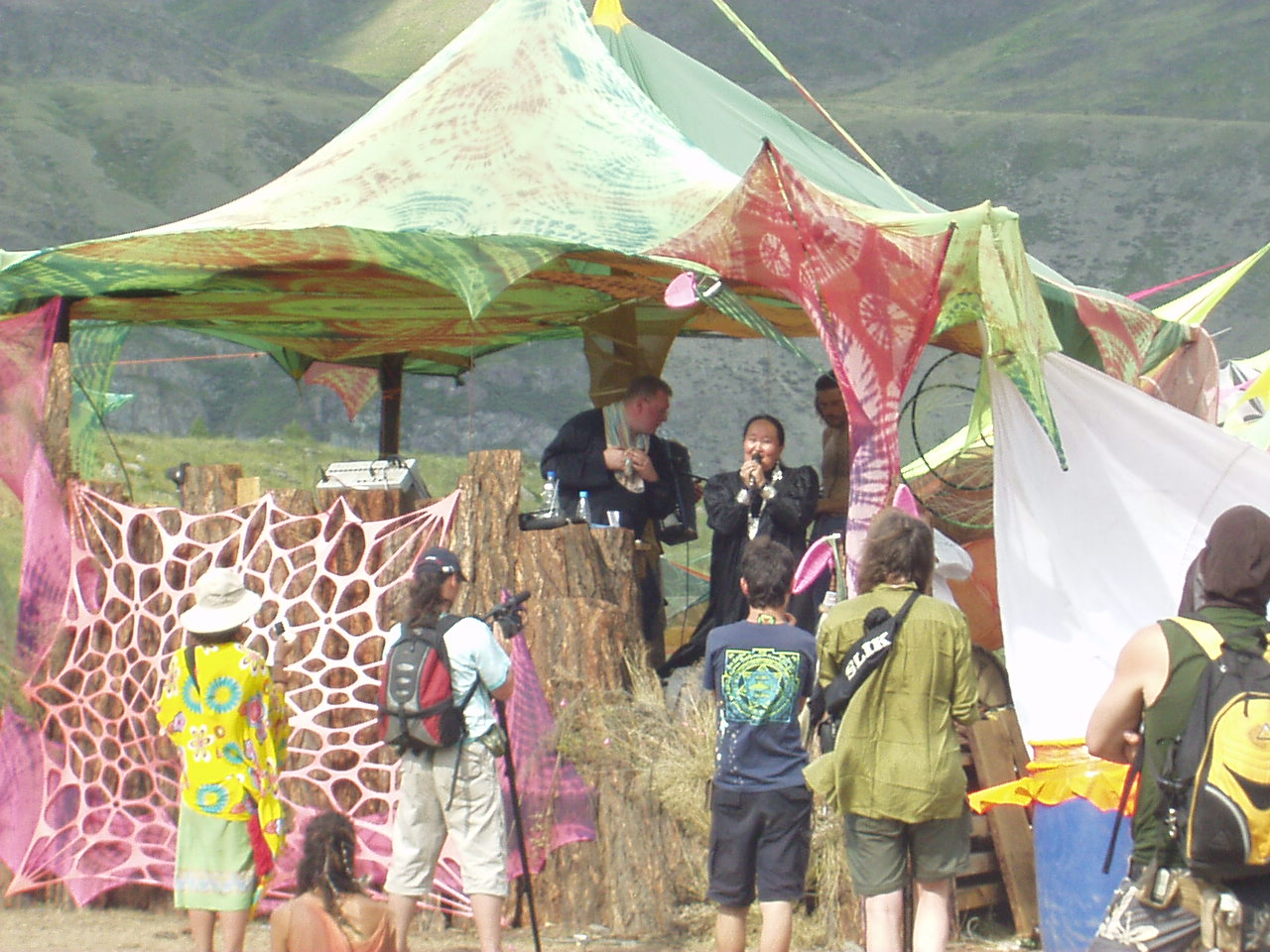
Stepanida Borisova is the Yakut folk singer

- Mongolie Chamanes et Lamas, Ocora C560059 (1994)
- Shamanic and Narrative Songs from the Siberian Arctic, Sibérie 1, Musique du Monde, BUDA 92564–2
- Musiche e sciamani, Musica del Mondo, Textus 001 (2000). Contains tracks assembled from the set of seven CDs of Siberian music on BUDA curated by Henri Lecomte. Sold with book (in Italian) Musiche e sciamani, ed Antonello Colimberti, Textus 2000.
- Kim Suk Chul / Kim Seok Chul Ensemble: Shamanistic Ceremonies of the Eastern Seaboard, JVC, VICG-5261 (1993)
- Trommeln der Schamanen, Tondokumente der Ausstellung, Völkerkundemuseum der Universität Zürich (2007)
- Tuva, Among the Spirits, Smithsonian Folkways SFW 40452 (1999)
- Stepanida Borisova, Vocal Evocations of Sakha-Yakutia (1) SOASIS 17 (2008)
- Chyskyyrai, Vocal Evocations of Sakha-Yakutia (2) SOASIS 18 (2008)
- Gendos Chamzyrzn, Kamlaniye, Long Arms (Russia) CDLA 04070 (2004)
- Tabuk, Contemporary Sakha Folk Music, Feelee LP (Russia) FL 3018/019 (1991)

== See also ==
- Regional forms of shamanism
- Shamanism
- Ayahuasca
