= Embryo (band) =

German world music band

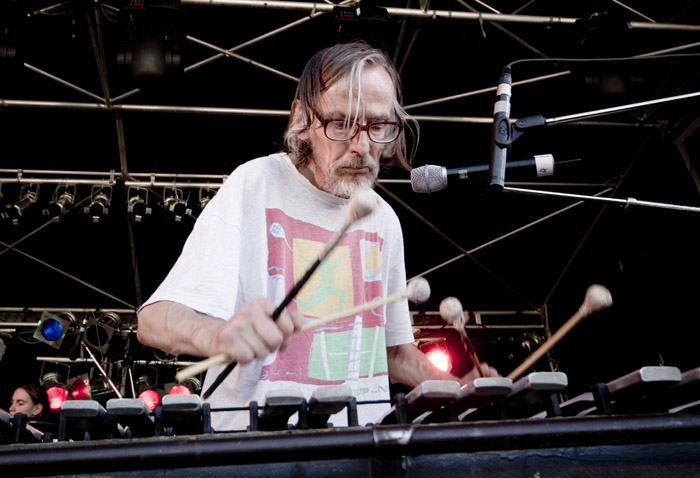
- Christian Burchard, Finkenbach Festival 2011

Background information
- Origin: Munich, West Germany
- Genres: Progressive rock, krautrock, jazz rock, folk rock, jazz fusion, psychedelic rock
- Years active: 1969–present
- Labels: Brain, Schneeball, Materiali Sonori, Garden of Delight, Ohr, United Artists
- Members: Marja Burchard; Valentin Altenberger; Maasl Maier; Jens Polheide; Dieter Serfas; Mik Quantius
- Past members: Chris Karrer; Roman Bunka; Sigi Schwab; Maria Archer; Ulrich Bassenge; Hermann Breuer; Christian Burchard; Roberto Détrée; Jörg Evers; Hansi Fischer; Ralph Fischer; Yulyus Golombeck; Geoff Goodman; Klaus Götzner; Chuck Henderson; Karsten Hochapfel; Edgar Hofmann; Jimmy Jackson; Al Jones; Friedemann Josch; Remigius Drechsler; Dave King; Chris Lachotta; Gerald Hartwig Luciano; Lothar Meid; Dieter Miekautsch; Uve Müllrich; Masaru Nishimoto; Freddy Setz; Ramesh Shotam; Lothar Stahl; Michael Wehmeyer; Max Weissenfeldt
- Website: embryo.de

Embryo is a krautrock band from Munich, West Germany that began in 1969. Its origins have even been traced to the 1950s in the city of Hof, when musicians Christian Burchard and Dieter Serfas met at the age of 10. The band was described by one critic as "the most eclectic of the krautrock bands."

== History ==
In 1969, the band was founded by multi-instrumentalist Christian Burchard (drums, vibraphone, santur, keyboard) and Edgar Hofmann (saxophone, flutes). To date, more than 400 musicians have played with the collective, some on multiple occasions, such as Charlie Mariano, Trilok Gurtu, Ramesh Shotham, Marty Cook, Yuri Parfenov, Allan Praskin, X.Nie, Nick McCarthy, Monty Waters and Mal Waldron. Longtime members have been Edgar Hofmann (sax, violin), Dieter Serfas (drums), Roman Bunka (guitar, oud), Uve Müllrich (bass), Michael Wehmeyer (keyboard), Chris Karrer (guitar, oud, violin, sax), Lothar Stahl (marimba, drums), and Jens Polheide (bass, flute).

With Ton Steine Scherben, they were founders of the first German independent label Schneeball in 1976.

In 1979, the band started a nine-month tour to India by bus, which is documented in the movie Vagabunden Karawane. Embryo developed from jazzy Krautrock to a world music band, having merged different styles and trends throughout their history. Many of their albums originated during collective journeys in four continents. The band played many festivals around the globe: in India (Mumbai Jazz 1979), England (Reading 1973), Nigeria (Port Harcourt Jazz 1987), and Japan (Wakayama 1991) to name a few. In July 2008, Embryo was awarded the German World Music Award RUTH 2008 at the TFF Rudolstadt Festival.

In 1981, Müllrich and Wehmeyer left Embryo to form Embryo's Dissidenten, who soon became simply Dissidenten.

On the road to Morocco in March 2016, Christian Burchard had a stroke. Since then, his daughter Marja Burchard (drums, vibraphone, vocals, trombone, keyboard), who grew up with the band, has been leading Embryo.

On January 17, 2018 Christian Burchard died in Munich. He was 71 years old.

On July 2nd 2026, the band started a successful crowdfunding campaign on GoodCrowd.org to fund the repairs of their tour bus and get back on the road.

== Discography ==
- Opal (Ohr, 1970)
- Embryo's Rache (United Artists, 1971)
- Father Son and Holy Ghosts (United Artists, 1972)
- Steig Aus (Brain/Metronome, 1973)
- We Keep On (BASF, 1973)
- Rocksession (Brain/Metronome, 1973)
- Surfin' (Buk, 1975)
- Bad Heads and Bad Cats (April, 1976)
- Live (April, 1977)
- Apo Calypso (April, 1977)
- Embryo's Reise (Schneeball, 1979)
- Anthology (Materiali Sonori, 1980)
- Life (Schneeball, 1981)
- La Blama Sparozzi Zwischenzonen (Schneeball, 1982)
- Zack Gluck (Materiali Sonori, 1984)
- Embryo & Yoruba Dun Dun Orchester feat. Muraina Oyelami (Schneeball, 1985)
- Africa (Materiali Sonori, 1987)
- Jazzbuhne Berlin '89 (Amiga, 1989)
- Turn Peace (Schneeball, 1989)
- Ibn Battuta (Schneeball/Indigo, 1994)
- Ni Hau (Schneeball/Indigo, 1996)
- Tour 98: Istanbul-Casablanca (Schneeball/Indigo, 1999)
- Invisible Documents (Disconforme, 1999)
- For Eva (Disconforme, 2000)
- 2000 Live Vol. 1 (Schneeball/Indigo, 2000)
- 2001 Live Vol. 1 (Schneeball/Indigo, 2002)
- 29.6.73 in Hamburg (Schneeball, 2003)
- Bremen 1971 (Garden of Delights, 2003)
- Hallo Mik (Schneeball/Indigo, 2004)
- Embryonnck (Staubgold/Schneeball, 2006)
- News (Ultimate, 2006)
- Live in Wendland (Schneeball, 2007)
- Freedom in Music (Schneeball/Indigo, 2008)
- Wiesbaden 1972 (Garden of Delights, 2008)
- Live at Burg Herzberg Festival 2007 (Trip in Time, 2008)
- Sloow Tapes (Choiak, 2010)
- Message from Era Ora (Black Sweat, 2013)
- Una Gira Per Catalunya (Cosmic Egg, 2014)
- Eternal Forces (Cosmic Egg, 2014)
- It Do (Trikont, 2016)
- Umsonst Und Draussen Vlotho 1977 (Garden of Delights, 2017)
- Auf Auf (Madlib Invazion, 2021)
