= Shaman punk =

Musical subgenre of punk and hardcore music

Shaman punk is a subgenre of punk rock and hardcore punk first used by critics to describe the musical style of Hungarian band Galloping Coroners in the 1980s.

== History ==
When Galloping Coroners (Hungarian: Vágtázó Halottkémek or simply VHK) was formed in 1975, there was not a defined category for the musical genre that they were exploring. Frontman Atilla Grandpierre was a student of shaman's music infusing Galloping Coroners with shamanistic philosophies and concepts from the start. Because the group was formed 1–2 years before the western punk movement the band didn't initially use the term "shaman punk" to define their music.

In late 1970s as punk rock emerged, VHK's relationship to punk and hardcore become obvious for both the band, fans and journalists. "Shamanistic punk", "psychedelic hardcore" and also "ethno punk" were expressions that began to be used retroactively by western musical press from the 1980s and was also applied by the Hungarian press after the political changes around 1989.

Some critics who regard tribal shaman music as an ancient form of folk music suggested the use of "ethno punk", while others claim that VHK's musical style should be regarded as a folk punk subgenre. But, while typical "folk punk" groups include national folk elements in their music, VHK's repetitive, ecstatic sound with distorted guitars and inarticulate howls is much closer to hardcore or even industrial rock.

Today the "shaman punk" expression is widely used in Hungarian and western musical media when talking about Galloping Coroners. To date there is no other group that is regarded as "shaman punk".

== Philosophy ==
The concept of "shaman punk" music is rooted in VHK's musical philosophy which includes exploring contemporary musical expressions of what prehistoric shamans did by their ecstatic, tribal ceremonies to find and join the powers of nature and creation. The band states that "it is a magical folk-music, a cosmic vision about the role of earthly life on the destination of the Universe." VHK has described their music as "an instinctive primeval music liberating the elementary powers of nature - creating ourselves and evolving to its highest completion with a free spontaneity and overwhelming energy." Band leader Attila Grandpierre explains this in his manifesto Punk As a Rebirth of Shamanist Folk Music in 1984 :

Punk is not simply a new, superficial "wave in fashion" but a radical reinterpretation of art, punk has gone back to such forgotten, underground layers of ancient culture... and plays the same role as shamanic ceremonies played in the “prehistoric” times giving a magic force for its creators, leading to ecstasy, and, through its force, elevated the participant’s relation to himself and the world into a symbolic order.

== Bibliography ==
1. Contemplating the Heavens with VHK's Atilla Grandpierre, by Jordan N. Mamone, at www.vice.com, 2013
2. New York Times: Critic's Notebook; Rock Music of Eastern Europe: So Western, So Familiar, So Old By JON PARELES Published: February 28, 1990,
3. Attila Grandpierre: Punk As a Rebirth of Shamanist Folk Music
4. Documentary film: VHK - The Ones Who Taught Death a Lesson, 2012
5. imdb.com Documentary film: VHK - The Ones Who Taught Death a Lesson, 2012
6. Interview with Attila Grandpierre, by Archie Patterson, Eurock.com
7. Anna Szemere: Up from the Underground: The Culture of Rock Music in Postsocialist Hungary, The Pennsylvania State University Press, University Park, 2001
