= Chris Karrer =

German guitarist and composer (1947–2024)

- Chris Karrer, c. 2010
- Born: 20 January 1947; Kempten, Bavaria, Germany
- Died: 2 January 2024 (aged 76)
- Occupations: Guitarist; Oud player; Composer
- Organizations: Amon Düül II

Christoph Karrer (20 January 1947 – 2 January 2024) was a German guitarist and composer who also played saxophone, violin and oud.

He was a pioneer of krautrock, playing and recording with his band Amon Düül II from 1969 when they released their first album Phallus Dei.

He wrote film scores and played them with the band; the music for Hans-Jürgen Syberberg's San Domingo earned them the Deutscher Filmpreis for film music in 1971. From the 1980s Karrer played as a soloist and with Embryo, a band that combined elements of rock and jazz with music from Africa and India.

== Biography ==
Christoph Karrer was born in Kempten on 20 January 1947. He played clarinet and saxophone from age 12. After his Abitur he studied art at the Academy of Fine Arts, Munich.

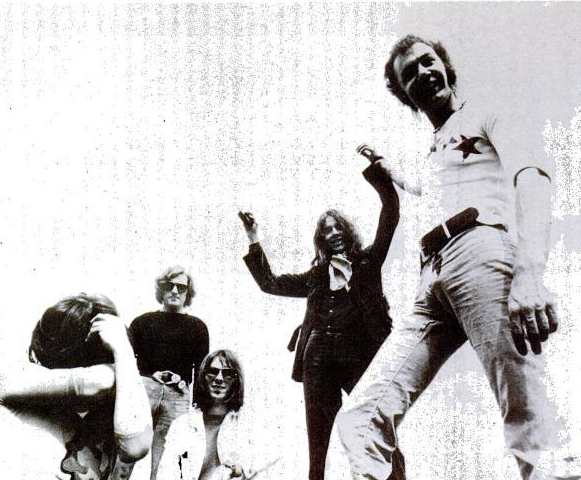
1972 Amon Düül II Billboard advertisement

Karrer co-founded, with Peter Leopold, Dieter Serfas and others, the Amon Düül band and commune in 1967, in the spirit of the student movement. Arguments about the musical focus caused him to turn to Amon Düül II, playing more advanced experimental music later named krautrock, in opposition to German groups only imitating foreign styles. Their 1969 debut album was Phallus Dei, which featured "abstract" singing and driving percussion. Karrer was one of the first musicians using the violin for rock music. With Amon Düül II, he composed and played film music for Rainer Werner Fassbinder's The Niklashausen Journey and for Hans-Jürgen Syberberg's film San Domingo, which earned Amon Düül II the Deutscher Filmpreis for film music in 1971. The group disbanded in the late 1970s.

From the early 1980s, Karrer collaborated with Embryo, a band for jazz rock and world music. The group had begun in the late 1960s as one of the first to combine elements of rock and jazz, and had integrated ethno-musical influences before the term world music was invented, touring Africa, India and Japan, among others.

Karrer explored the sounds of the oud and its music inspired by Sufism, influenced by Sivan Perwer, Rabih Abou-Khalil and Abdul Wahab who played with him. He also became interested in the rubab. He later focused on the flamenco guitar.

=== Personal life ===
Karrer spent the last two decades with his partner and a daughter in Kronach. He painted again and worked on an autobiography. He played guitar during readings of literature and lyrics.

Karrer died on 2 January 2024, after a COVID-19 infection, at the age of 76.

== Discography ==
- with Amon Düül II
- with Embryo

=== Solo ===
Karrer's recordings are held by the German National Library:

- Chris Karrer LP (1980) with Curt Cress
- Dervish Kiss (1994) with Sivan Perwer and Rabih Abou-Khalil
- Sufisticated CD (1996)
- The Mask CD (1997) with Mani Neumeier and Christian Burchard
- Grandezza Mora CD (1999)

=== Collaborations ===
- Missus Beastly (LP 1970) with Missus Beastly
- Fitzcarraldo (LP 1982, CD 2005) with Popol Vuh
- Patchwork (CD 1999) with M. T. Wizzard
- Dunarobba (LP 2000) with Militia
- Temporale (CD 2005) with Alhambra
- PSY (2008) with Guru Guru
- Portrait (2009) with Uli Trepte
