= Radio (Michael Rother album) =

Compilation album by Michael Rother
- Released: October 1993
- Recorded: 1977–1993, Random Studio, Forst and Conny's Studio, Neunkirchen-Seelscheid
- Genre: Krautrock; proto-punk; art rock
- Length: 71:10
- Label: Random Records
- Producer: Michael Rother, Conny Plank

Michael Rother chronology
Traumreisen (1987)	Radio (1993)	Esperanza (1996)

Radio (also known as Radio – Musik von Michael Rother – Singles, 1977–1993) is the first compilation album by the German solo artist Michael Rother. It was released in October 1993.

The majority of the compilation is made up of Rother's solo work from his seven studio albums released between 1977 and 1987. Also included are six additional recordings made between 1988 and 1993 at Rother's own studio Random Studio in Forst. Receiving positive reviews the album was released as a CD in October 1993. The album was reissued on CD in 2000. The artwork for the album was designed by Ulrich von Sinnen with photography by Ann Weitz.

== Releases and music ==
Radio was first released on Random Records as a CD in October 1993. That year Rother had secured the rights to his back catalogue and re-issued all of his solo albums with bonus tracks and remastered sound on his own label, Random Records. The compilation was designed to be a taster for the larger re-issue campaign showcasing each album through the appearance of two songs from each album. Similarly The six bonus tracks, some of which appear on the individual studio albums in longer and differing forms, act as a compilation of the new material.

In 2000, Rother re-issued all of the albums again including Radio in partnership between Random Records and BSC Music.

The studio album tracks compiled are singles and appear in shorter radio edits, hence the album's title. Alongside each A-side single is a B-side, in come cases these are swapped for edits of other album tracks. In place of "Katzenmusik 2" is "Katzenmusik 5". The two A-sides from 1982's Fernwärme, "Hohe Luft" and "Silberstreif" appear, but their B-sides "Erlkönig" and "Fortuna" do not. "Cascadia", the B-side of "Palmengarten" is replaced with "Primadonna". "Süssherz" is included instead of "Rapido". "Happy-End", the B-side of "Lichtermeer" is replaced with "Südseewellen". The radio edits of these B-sides have never been re-released.

The compilation is relatively chronological, for while the album tracks are in order, they are bookended by the new material and remixes. Aside from the new material is "Morning Sun", a song that was recorded in collaboration with Station 17 in 1990. "Morning Sun" is a re-recording of "Fontana Di Luna" which originally appeared on 1978's Sterntaler. Station 17 is a project that gives disabled people the opportunity to work as an artist in music, movie and video.

== Reception ==
Professional ratings
Review scores
Source	Rating
Allmusic	4.5/5 stars

Radio received positive reviews by the majority of critics.

== Track listing ==
All tracks are written by Michael Rother.

Side one
No.	Title	From the album	Length
1.	"Die Ganze Welt (World Mix)"		3:55
2.	"Palmero Tango"		3:20
3.	"Tiefenschärfe 1993 (Trance Remix)"		3:20
4.	"Andenexpress"		2:50
5.	"Nachtpassage (Chill Remix)"		3:51
6.	"Flammende Herzen"	Flammende Herzen	3:51
7.	"Karussell"	Flammende Herzen	2:55
8.	"Sonnenrad"	Sterntaler	3:15
9.	"Sterntaler"	Sterntaler	3:40
10.	"Katzenmusik 9"	Katzenmusik	3:24
11.	"Katzenmusik 5"	Katzenmusik	3:38
12.	"Silberstreif"	Fernwärme	3:52
13.	"Hohe Luft"	Fernwärme	3:13
14.	"Palmengarten"	Lust	2:47
15.	"Primadonna"	Lust	3:14
16.	"Süssherz"	Süssherz & Tiefenschärfe	3:32
17.	"Glitzerglanz"	Süssherz & Tiefenschärfe	3:13
18.	"Lichtermeer"	Traumreisen	3:30
19.	"Südseewellen"	Traumreisen	3:18
20.	"Morning Sun"	Station 17	3:09
21.	"Flammende Herzen (Film-Remix)"		3:55

== Personnel ==
- Michael Rother - All Instruments, Electronics, Tapes, Producer
- Jaki Liebezeit - Drums (6 to 13)
- Joachim Rudolph - Bass (tracks 1 and 21), Drums (track 1)
- Conny Plank - Producer (6 to 11)
