= Live 1974 =

Live album by Harmonia
- Released: 18 September 2007
- Recorded: 23 March 1974 at Penny Station, Griessem, Germany
- Genre: Krautrock; electronic; ambient; experimental rock
- Length: 58:02
- Label: Grönland Records

Harmonia chronology
Tracks and Traces (1997)	Live 1974 (2007)	Tracks and Traces (Reissue) (2009)

Live 1974 is the only live album released by krautrock group Harmonia. It was recorded live in concert on 23 March 1974 at Penny Station in Griessem, Germany. The live album was released in 2007 by Grönland Records. Its release sparked enough interest in the group to convince them to reform in order to promote the album.

== Composition ==
All five compositions are created live by applying the music-making principles common to the music of Harmonia, further exploring the sounds of their recent album Musik Von Harmonia (1974) before release of their more structured and "glossier" work on Deluxe (1975). It is "expansive and free form", often going beyond 10 minute mark, and based around highly repetitious beats and enveloped with thick drones. Wilson Neate described Live 1974 as "hypno-minimalist soundscape", inspired in its melodic and rhythmic patterns by the likes of Terry Riley. Neate described "Holta-Polta" as a relentless drive through "dark, disquieting industrial dub terrain", and characterized "Veteranissimo" as Motorik.

Several journalist remarked on the surprisingly high quality recording, containing almost nothing in the way of crowd noise sans a couple of coughs. According to guitarist Michael Rother, the audience was "too stoned to notice where one quietly propulsive instrumental ended and the next began, never mind register their reaction".

== Reception ==
Professional ratings
Review scores
Source	Rating
Allmusic	4/5 stars
Pitchfork	8.8/10
Line of Best Fit	73%

Mark Richardson (Pitchfork) believed that Live 1974 represent "the band as well as any" and shows something "as beautiful as anything on their proper records", while Line of Best Fit argued that the record is not "the best place to start for new fans", while admitting that the "diehard" fans of Harmonia would like it. Line of Best Fit deemed it inaccessible due to being "a bit samey and last for a ridiculously long time, a bit like dub but in a cold climate", especially on the 17-minute "Veteranissimo" and the opener "Schaumberg", describing the latter as "a bit like a more sedentary version of "Girls and Boys" by Blur, only it lasts ten minutes and does not actually go anywhere". Jedd Beaudoin (PopMatters) praised it as a "highly spiritual" performance.

Both Line of Best Fit and Wilson Neate (AllMusic) singled out "Arabesque" as the stand out piece for its "sheer weirdness", as well as "exquisite" and "ornate" qualities, as if crafting a "sonic mandala". The former publication compared it to Stone Roses' "Don't Stop", if it was produced by Captain Beefheart.

== Track listing ==
All music written and performed by Michael Rother, Hans-Joachim Roedelius and Dieter Moebius.

1. "Schaumburg" – 10:45
2. "Veteranissimo" – 17:25
3. "Arabesque" – 5:20
4. "Holta-Polta" – 15:00
5. "Ueber Ottenstein" – 9:30

== Personnel ==
Harmonia

- Michael Rother – guitar, electronic percussion, piano, organ
- Hans-Joachim Roedelius – electronic organ, piano
- Dieter Moebius – synthesizer, electronic percussion

Production

- Harmonia – recording, editing, artwork
- Christine Roedelius – photos
- Ann Weitz – photos
