= Year of the Tiger (La! Neu? album) =

Studio album by La! Neu?
- Released: 1998
- Recorded: 1997–8
- Genre: Krautrock, post-punk, trance
- Label: Captain Trip Records
- Producer: Klaus Dinger

Klaus Dinger chronology
Goldregen (1998)	Year of the Tiger (1998)	Live in Tokyo 1996 Vol. 2 (1999)

Year of the Tiger is the sixth album released by German band La! Neu?. Like its sister-album Goldregen it was recorded and released relatively quickly in 1997–8. Unlike Goldregen – which featured only acoustic instruments – Year of the Tiger is predominantly electronic and beat-driven. The entire album is performed live on the CD Live at Kunsthalle Düsseldorf.

== Background and recording ==
The album is named for a phrase used in a postcard sent by an American fan named George to Klaus Dinger in 1998, referring to the zodiac calendar, according to which the Year of the Tiger began on 28 January 1998. The back of the postcard features on the cover artwork.

Recording began in October 1997, after La! Neu?'s pianist Rembrandt Lensink (whose album Rembrandt: God Strikes Back was released in January 1998) presented Dinger with a lengthy synthesizer piece which could not fit on his own album. Dinger decided to work the piece into a La! Neu? album, and had Rembrandt re-record the basic synthesizer track. Some time in 1998 this was overdubbed with Dinger's drum playing and Victoria Wehrmeister's vocals to create "Autoportrait Rembrandt", a half-hour-long trance-esque motorik piece.

After this a second long piece was begun, built around a circulating guitar riff played by Dinger. Added to this was a motorik drum loop and a further guitar part by Dinger's friend Rudige "Spinello" Elze (who had last played with Dinger in the 1980s) as well as another of Wehrmeister's improvised vocal parts. This track was named "Notre Dame" after Wehrmeister's lyric (although also possibly in reference to Harmonia's album Deluxe, which features several tracks similar in character to Year of the Tiger, and one named "Notre Dame"). Both tracks display a high standard of production in comparison to the looser Goldregen and also a greater focus on rhythm. Dinger said in August 1998—

Rhythm is central to 'Year of the Tiger'. The meaning of the trademark Neu! and La Düsseldorf beat which I have called "Appache" since 1985 is that life is continual movement. In German, the beat is called "lange gerade" ["long straight"] - the human aspect is central to it.

Around the same time as these sessions, Dinger met up with Eberhard Kranemann for the first time since the 1970s. Kranemann had lived with Dinger in a Düsseldorf commune for a while in the early 1970s, and had played bass and slide guitar for Neu! and Kraftwerk. When Dinger founded a record label in 1973, he had intended to release a Fritz Müller (Kranemann's stage name) album on it, but never did. Dinger therefore became interested in helping Kranemann release an album using the La! Neu? imprint on Captain Trip Records. Kranemann's band "Bluepoint Underground" was thus brought to meet Dinger, and recorded a short, multi-tracked song with Dinger and Wehrmeister. This was incorporated onto Year of the Tiger as "Intro", partly in order to promote Bluepoint Underground's album Bluepoint Underground in New York City, which was released on CTR later in 1998 (with Dinger as producer).

== Track listing ==
1. "Intro" – 1:06 (Oliver Blum, Klaus Dinger, Caroline Keufen, Eberhard Kranemann, Victoria Wehrmeister)
2. "Autoportrait Rembrandt" – 32:19 (Dinger, Rembrandt Lensink, Wehrmeister)
3. "Notre Dame" – 33:21 (Dinger, Spinello Elze, Wehrmeister)

== Personnel ==
La! Neu?

- Klaus Dinger – drums (all tr.), guitar (tr. 3)
- Spinello Elze – guitar (tr. 3)
- Rembrandt Lensink – synthesizer (tr. 2)
- Victoria Wehrmeister – vocals (all tr.)

Bluepoint Underground

- Oliver Blum – guitar (tr. 1)
- Caroline Keufen – vocals (tr. 1)
- Eberhard Kranemann – bass (tr. 1)
