= Crazy (Neu! song) =

Single by Neu!

from the album Neu! '86
- B-side: "Euphoria"
- Released: 17 April 2010
- Recorded: 1985–6
- Genre: Krautrock, pop, art rock
- Label: Grönland Records
- Songwriter(s): Klaus Dinger & Michael Rother
- Producer(s): Klaus Dinger & Michael Rother

Klaus Dinger singles chronology
"'Mon Amour'" (1985)	"Crazy" (2010)

Crazy is a 2010 12" vinyl single by German band Neu!. It was released shortly after the Neu! Vinyl Box on Grönland Records as a part of Record Store Day. It was the first Neu! single to be released since Isi in 1975 and the only single to be taken from Neu! '86. It was sold in a limited edition and was only available for a short time after 17 April 2010.

== Recording & Release ==
The two songs were recorded during the brief studio-only Neu! reunion of 1985-6. The failure of the sessions led Klaus Dinger and Michael Rother to seal the master tapes with wax and once again disband Neu!.

The unavailability of the original three Neu! albums in the 1990s caused mass bootlegging, particularly by the Luxembourg label Germanofon, which Dinger personally attempted to contact, without success. Many music retailers were fooled by the bootlegs, and the Krautrock revival caused by Julian Cope's book Krautrocksampler put the Neu! albums in high demand. Unable to reach an agreement with Rother, Dinger released the tapes of the 1980s sessions as Neu! 4 in 1995 on Captain Trip Records, Tokyo without informing Rother. This incensed Dinger's bandmate, and the CD was soon deleted. Fan interest in the CD grew, and in 2010 Rother was forced to concede a proper release for the album on Grönland Records as Neu! '86. To coincide with this release, Crazy was put out as a vinyl limited-edition single on Record Store Day.

"Crazy" is a vocal pop song, whilst "Euphoria" is an instrumental. On Neu! 4, "Euphoria" was titled "Quick Wave Machinelle" and was less heavily produced.

== Track listing ==
All tracks composed by Klaus Dinger and Michael Rother.

1. "Crazy" - 3:09
2. "Euphoria" - 3:59

== Personnel ==
- Klaus Dinger - drums, electronics, guitar, percussion, synthesizer, vocals
- Michael Rother - bass, guitar, keyboards
