= Neu! Vinyl Box =

Box set by Neu!
- Released: 10 May 2010
- Recorded: 1971–1986
- Length: 191:29
- Label: Grönland Records
- Producers: Conny Plank; Neu!

Neu! chronology
1972 Live (2009)	Neu! Vinyl Box (2010)	Neu! '86 (2010)

Klaus Dinger chronology
1972 Live (2009)	Neu! Vinyl Box (2010)	Neu! '86 (2010)

Neu! Vinyl Box is a compilation box set by the German band Neu!, formed by Klaus Dinger and Michael Rother. Released in 2010 on vinyl, digital download and promotional CD; it consists of the group's three 1970s studio albums (Neu!, Neu! 2 and Neu! '75); Neu! '86, their aborted mid-1980s album; and a 12" maxi-single of highlights of a 1972 rehearsal recording. The boxset also included a 36-page picture book, stencil, T-shirt and digital download code.

== Track listing ==
All songs written and composed by Klaus Dinger and Michael Rother.

=== Neu! ===
Side 1
No.	Title	Length
1.	"Hallogallo"	10:07
2.	"Sonderangebot"	4:51
3.	"Weissensee"	6:46

Side 2
No.	Title	Length
4.	"Im Glück'"	6:53
5.	"Negativland"	9:47
6.	"Lieber Honig"	7:18
Total length:		45:40

=== Neu! 2 ===
Side 3
No.	Title	Length
1.	"Für Immer (Forever)"	11:17
2.	"Spitzenqualität"	3:35
3.	"Gedenkminute (für A + K)"	2:06
4.	"Lila Engel"	4:37

Side 4
No.	Title	Length
5.	"Neuschnee 78"	2:32
6.	"Super 16"	3:39
7.	"Neuschnee"	4:07
8.	"Cassetto"	1:48
9.	"Super 78"	1:36
10.	"Hallo Excentrico!"	3:44
11.	"Super"	3:11
Total length:		42:13

=== Neu! '75 ===
Side 5
No.	Title	Length
1.	"Isi"	5:06
2.	"Seeland"	6:54
3.	"Leb' Wohl"	8:50

Side 6
No.	Title	Length
4.	"Hero"	7:11
5.	"E-Musik"	9:57
6.	"After Eight"	4:44
Total length:		42:41

=== Neu! '86 ===
Side 7
No.	Title	Length
1.	"Intro (slo-mo)"	0:33
2.	"Dänzing"	5:05
3.	"Crazy"	3:14
4.	"Drive (Grundfunken)"	5:13
5.	"La Bomba (Stop Apartheid World-Wide!)"	5:30
6.	"Elanoizan"	2:31

Side 8
No.	Title	Length
7.	"Wave Mother"	4:52
8.	"Paradise Walk"	5:11
9.	"Euphoria"	3:57
10.	"Vier 1/2"	1:01
11.	"Good Life"	3:41
12.	"November"	1:42
13.	"KD"	1:55
Total length:		44:27

=== Neu! '72 - 6 May 72 - Non-Public Test ===
Side 9
No.	Title	Length
1.	"Untitled"	7:47

Side 10
No.	Title	Length
2.	"Untitled"	6:10
3.	"Untitled"	2:30
Total length:		16:27
