= Live at Kunsthalle Düsseldorf =

Live album by La! Neu?
- Released: 2001
- Recorded: 19 July 1998
- Genre: Krautrock, post-punk, art rock
- Label: Captain Trip Records
- Producer: Klaus Dinger

Klaus Dinger chronology
Blue (1999)	Live at Kunsthalle Düsseldorf (2001)	1972 Live (2009)

Live at Kunsthalle Düsseldorf is a double-disc live album by German band La! Neu? released in 2001, after the band had split up. It consists of a recording of their final concert, held at Kunsthalle Düsseldorf on 19 July 1998. Immediately after the concert, the band disbanded amicably (in part due to pressure from Klaus Dinger's ex-bandmate Michael Rother, who resented Dinger's use of the word "Neu!" in La! Neu?'s name).

== Concert and release ==
The concert was organised by Dinger's friends in the Düsseldorf academic community - for example Dr. Ralf Gawlista, who managed Dinger's website. It was to be the only concert La! Neu? would ever play in Germany (they toured Japan in 1996) as well as the band's final performance together (at least under the La! Neu? name).

The concert begins with a short piano overture before launching into a 32-minute rendition of "Autoportrait Rembrandt" (from Year of the Tiger) in which Spinello Elze's guitar is added to Rembrandt Lensink's synthesizer and Victoria Wehrmeister's vocals. Dinger played drums in concert for the first time since 1972. At the end of the song Dinger twice interrupts Lensink and Wehrmeister's improvisation because he felt they were playing for too long: "Vicky, Rembrandt, shut up!".

This is followed by "Zeeland Wunderbar" from Goldregen. Dinger's mother Renate sang lead vocals on stage, as on the album version. "Notre Dame" follows, again from Year of the Tiger. Disc 2 opens with a piano and vocal improvisation by Lensink and Wehrmeister (not actually a live version of the song of the same name from Goldregen). Dinger interrupts the song half-way through, asking the audience to be quiet, before realising that the talking he can hear (clearly audible on the recording) is coming from outside the concert hall. This is followed by an ambient recording of the last 30 seconds of a concert-break leading into "Comme Nuages" (from Goldregen), on which Dinger plays harmonium. This is followed by a second (possibly non-continuous) concert pause, in which the band can be heard practicing "The Hit ? Demo" acoustically.

"The Hit ? Demo" uses the same drum loop used for "Notre Dame", but sped up, and is the only song performed not to feature on a La! Neu? studio album. The final song is a moving version of "Time" from La Düsseldorf's debut album, in which Victoria Wehrmeister both sings and plays a hand-drum. The album closes with two minutes of applause.

The album was mastered in 2001 by Kazuyuki Onouchi, with whom Dinger would make his next album: Japandorf. A video recording of the concert made by Thomas Dinger exists, and a small portion has been uploaded to YouTube. The booklet is largely constructed of the film negatives of Thomas Dinger's video.

== Track listing ==
Disc 1

1. "Overtüre" - 2:58 (Rembrandt Lensink)
2. "Autoportrait Rembrandt" - 32:27 (Klaus Dinger, Lensink, Victoria Wehrmeister)
3. "Zeeland Wunderbar" - 7:20 (K. Dinger, Renate Dinger)
4. "Notre Dame" - 22:59 (K. Dinger, Spinello Elze, Wehrmeister)

Disc 2

1. "Rembrandt + Victoria | 2" - 6:12 (Lensink, Wehrmeister)
2. "Pause 1" - 0:24
3. "Comme Nuages" - 5:43 (K. Dinger, Wehrmeister)
4. "Pause 2" - 1:52 (K. Dinger, R. Dinger, Elze, Lensink, Wehrmeister)
5. "The Hit ? Demo" - 13:54 (K. Dinger, Elze, Wehrmeister)
6. "Time" - 15:02 (K. Dinger)

== Personnel ==
La! Neu?

- Klaus Dinger - drums (disc 1 tr. 2 & 4, disc 2 tr. 5), guitar, harmonium (disc 2 tr. 3), piano (disc 1 tr. 3), vocals
- Renate Dinger - vocals (disc 1 tr. 3)
- Spinello Elze - electronics, guitar
- Rembrandt Lensink - piano
- Victoria Wehrmeister - hand-drum, tambourine, vocals

Non-Musician

- Thomas Dinger - video negatives
- Lukas Hegemann - recording
- Kazuyuki Onouchi - booklet, mastering
- Miki Yui - booklet
