= Live in Tokyo 1996 Vol. 2 =

Live album by La! Neu?
- Released: 1999
- Recorded: 3 December 1996
- Genres: Krautrock, post-punk, art rock
- Label: Captain Trip Records
- Producer: Klaus Dinger

Klaus Dinger chronology
Year of the Tiger (1998)	Live in Tokyo 1996 Vol. 2 (1999)	Blue (1999)

Live in Tokyo 1996 Vol. 2 is a 1999 live album by German band La! Neu?, recorded during their 1996 Japanese tour at a concert in Tokyo. Despite its title, the album actually consists of the first half of the concert, the second half having been released in 1998 as Cha Cha 2000 - Live in Tokyo 1996 Vol. 1. The album consists of a mixture of live improvisation and set songs, including some sampled material from English musician Mick Lount.

== Background to tour ==
In early 1996 Klaus Dinger and Michael Rother met in Düsseldorf to review their ongoing legal battle with Metronome Records for the rights to the three original Neu! albums which they made together in the 1970s. Metronome had offered to compromise with Dinger and Rother by giving the two musicians a sizable proportion of the profits made from a reissue of the albums and by financing promotional activities, possibly including a world tour. Whilst Dinger was willing to accept this offer, Rother was more hesitant, still hoping to secure full ownership of the recordings. In the meantime, Dinger spoke to Ken Matsutani (the head of Captain Trip Records which was at that time releasing Dinger's post-Neu! back catalogue), and Matsutani began looking for venues in Japan for the upcoming tour. Matsutani discovered two venues which were interested in hosting Neu! - Muse Hall in Osaka and On Air West in Tokyo. In early 1996 Cluster (a band associated with Neu! and particularly with Michael Rother) had visited both venues as part of a world tour and produced the album Japan 1996 Live from the result. Dinger and Neu! (like Cluster) had a comparatively large following in Japan, and it was anticipated that any Neu! concerts arranged would be well attended.

Michael Rother was unwilling to commit to a tour, however, much to Dinger's annoyance. Rather than back out of the conversations he was having with Tokyo and Osaka, Dinger decided to offer the services of a new group he had been building around Andreas Reihse of Kreidler and Victoria Wehrmeister of Superbilk. In reference to Neu! and La Düsseldorf he named the new band La! Neu?, and was quickly accepted by owner of the venues - Hirokazu Nambu (Dinger admitted that Nambu was taking a "risk" in inviting the unknown La! Neu?). In Germany he finalised the group's debut album Düsseldorf and prepared to take an extended 8-man line-up with him to Japan.

In the summer of 1996 Dinger was consumed with the organisation (by mail and fax) of an exhibition of his visual art in Auckland, New Zealand. Kerry Aberhart - the curator of the art gallery and a fan of Dinger's work - offered to fly to Japan in advance of La! Neu? to assist the group during their tour.

== Tour and concert setting ==
In late November 1996, Kerry Aberhart flew to Osaka and was met on 1 December by Ken Matsutani and members of Matsutani's band "Marble Sheep" (who had travelled from Tokyo). They "filled time drinking scotch in [Kerry's hotel] room" until Dinger and La! Neu? were due to arrive later that day. At 8:30 PM Aberhart and Marble Sheep travelled to the airport to meet La! Neu?, whose flight was slightly delayed. This was the first time Dinger had met his label head face-to-face, and the first time he had been to Japan.

They stayed overnight in Osaka (where it was snowing heavily) and performed at Muse Hall on 2 December. The stage had a rope stretched at shoulder-height across it, from which hung Japanese drums and bells which Dinger played during the concert along with his guitar. He was joined by drummers Thomas Klein and Markus Hofmann (both of Kreidler) as well as bassist and contrabassist Konstantin Wienstroer, guitarist Dirk Flader, vocalist Victoria Wehrmeister and keyboardists Andreas Reihse and Rembrandt Lensink. The concert went well, featuring much the same set list as the Tokyo concert.

The following day, the entourage travelled to On Air West, Tokyo, arriving slightly behind schedule. The stage was set up in much the same way as in Osaka, with the addition of a 3m square La! Neu? banner created by artist Yuri Shibata. Before the concert the band dined on noodles. Concert tickets bore the cryptic legend "Psychedelic Originators For Space Age Vol. 6", and sold well.

== Album content and performance ==
The album begins with a short sample of a conversation between Ken Matsutani and Klaus Dinger in transit from Osaka to Tokyo. This is followed on by a lengthier sound-piece recorded as La! Neu? arrived at On Air West. It features conversations in English between Dinger and various Japanese venue staff and fans, as well as the sound of Victoria Wehrmeister conducting a sound check on the vocal microphones.

The concert proper begins with "Tension", a quiet track largely consisting of Rembrandt Lensink's keyboard improvisations. After six minutes "Viva" begins without warning; the band evidently attempting to surprise the audience. "Viva" is extended to 15 minutes and features a new vocal melody sung by Wehrmeister. After "Viva", Dinger addresses the audience for the first time, saying—

The next one [i.e. song] is supposed to be "Hero '96". Does anyone remember that? [silence] Or do you only remember "Hero"? [audience cheers] I mean, it's the same guy, just 22 years later.

Dinger then plays another audio-trick on the audience by turning off a loud synthesizer hiss, which had built up over the previous song without the audience realising. The end of "Hero '96" segues into a lengthy jam called "East West Special", which includes complicated tape manipulation, so at times the song is playing over a recording of itself. This, in turn, segues into the next track - "Anti-Rapman" - in which Dinger uses a preset keyboard rhythm to back more tape manipulation, commenting of the keyboard rhythm: "that should be forbidden, I find it horrid".

Rembrandt Lensink's keyboard improvisations lead in to "Message from California". In 1993 Dinger was sent a tape by English musician Mick Lount, who had encountered Neu! and La Düsseldorf whilst living in Germany as a teenager. Lount had moved to New Zealand in the 1980s, where he met Kerry Aberhart. On the release of Die Engel des Herrn in 1992 Aberhart introduced it to Lount. Soon afterwards Lount moved to Santa Clara, California with his girlfriend, and from there sent Dinger the tape, which includes an audio message of Lount speaking as well as several songs recorded by Lount. During "Message from California" Dinger plays Lount's tape to the audience; primarily the 'message' part, in which Lount explains who he is and why he is sending the tape. A short snippets of Lount's song "Arkesden" and one other song are also played, with added tape effects and ambient drones provided by La! Neu?. Eventually Dinger fades out the tape, leaving the synthesizer drones, which make up the next track - "Rheinarita".

This is followed by live versions of Dinger's songs "Mayday" (from Düsseldorf) and "America" (from Neondian). Following on from these at the concert was "Cha Cha 2000", which is covered by the first volume of the album.

== Track listing ==
All tracks composed by Klaus Dinger, except where indicated.

Disc 1

1. "Intro A: With Nambu on Shinkanzen" - 0:22
2. "Intro B: Entering On Air West" - 4:52
3. "Intro C: Tension" - 6:15 (Klaus Dinger, Dirk Flader, Markus Hofmann, Thomas Klein, Rembrandt Lensink, Andreas Reihse, Victoria Wehrmeister, Konstantin Wienstroer)
4. "Viva" - 14:10
5. "Hero '96" - 23:02

Disc 2

1. "Free in Tokyo A: East West Special" - 21:34 (Dinger, Flader, Hofmann, Klein, Lensink, Reihse, Wehrmeister, Wienstroer)
2. "Free in Tokyo B: Anti-Rapman" - 3:06 (Dinger, Flader, Hofmann, Klein, Lensink, Reihse, Wehrmeister, Wienstroer)
3. "Free in Tokyo C: Message from California" - 12:26 (Dinger, Flader, Hofmann, Klein, Lensink, Mick Lount, Reihse, Wehrmeister, Wienstroer)
4. "Free in Tokyo D: Rheinarita" - 3:45 (Dinger, Flader, Hofmann, Klein, Lensink, Reihse, Wehrmeister, Wienstroer)
5. "Mayday" - 11:09
6. "America" - 10:21

== Personnel ==
- Klaus Dinger - bamboos, bells, effects, gong, guitar, keyboard, sampling, taiko, vocals
- Dirk Flader - guitar
- Markus Hofmann - drums
- Thomas Klein - drums
- Rembrandt Lensink - percussion, piano, synthesizer, vocals
- Mick Lount (sampled) - accordion, bass, drums, guitar, slide guitar, vocals, voice
- Andreas Reihse - electronics, keyboards, synthesizer
- Victoria Wehrmeister - tambourine, vocals
- Konstantin Wienstroer - bass
