= Flammende Herzen =

Studio album by Michael Rother
- Released: March 1977
- Recorded: June–September 1976, in Conny's Studio
- Genre: Krautrock; art rock
- Length: 34:24
- Label: Sky
- Producer: Michael Rother, Conny Plank

Michael Rother chronology
Flammende Herzen (1977)	Sterntaler (1978)

Flammende Herzen (German for “Flaming Hearts”) is the debut studio album by the German solo artist Michael Rother. It was released in 1977 and includes the single "Flammende Herzen" b/w "Karussell". The music was used the following year to soundtrack Flaming Hearts. It was Rother's first solo venture after having recorded five albums prior as a member of Neu! with Klaus Dinger and Harmonia with Hans-Joachim Roedelius and Dieter Moebius.

The album was recorded between June and September 1976 in Germany at Conny's Studio. Receiving positive reviews the album was released as an LP in March 1977 before it was re-released by Polydor in 1982. The album was reissued on CD in 1990, before being re-issued again in 1993 with bonus tracks and having been remastered. The artwork for the album was designed by Rike with photography by Christian Rabe and Ann.

== Recording and music ==
Following the disbandment of Neu! having released their third studio album Neu! '75 in 1975, Rother worked again with Neu! and Harmonia producer Conny Plank on his first solo album. Jaki Liebezeit from Can augmented Rother on drums. Aside from Liebezeit, the entirety of the album was written and performed by Rother utilising guitar, bass guitar, electric piano, organ, synthesizer and electronic percussion. In contrast to Rother's work with his former groups, the album was completely instrumental and instead he performs the majority of the melodies using his guitar.

On completion of the sessions Rother re-united with Cluster members Hans-Joachim Roedelius and Dieter Moebius and former-Roxy Music member and solo artist Brian Eno to record a third Harmonia album in Forst in 1976. The studio sessions were productive but the recordings were left unreleased until November 1997 when they were released as Tracks and Traces and credited to 'Harmonia 76'.

== Releases ==
Flammende Herzen was first released on Sky Records as an LP in 1977. The album has been re-released several times, again as an LP on Polydor after Rother joined the label in 1982, then as a CD on Polygram in 1990. In 1993, Rother secured the rights to his back catalogue and re-issued all of his solo albums with bonus tracks and remastered sound on his own label, Random Records. In 2000, Rother re-issued all of the albums again in partnership between Random Records and BSC Music. Expanded editions include two versions of the title track recorded in the 1990s, "Vorbei (Flammende Herzen - Chill Remix 1993)" and "Flammende Herzen - Film Remix 1993" with Joachim Rudolph on drums, bass, and co-remixing. The album has since been released in the US on Water Records and as a heavyweight 180 gram LP on the 4 Men With Beards imprint.

== Reception ==
Professional ratings
Review scores
Source	Rating
Allmusic	4.5/5 stars
Dusted Reviews	(Positive)

Flammende Herzen received positive reviews by the majority of critics.

== Track listing ==
All tracks are written by Michael Rother

Side one
No.	Title	Length
1.	"Flammende Herzen"	7:04
2.	"Zyklodrom"	9:37

Side two
No.	Title	Length
3.	"Karussell"	5:22
4.	"Feuerland"	7:09
5.	"Zeni"	5:10

CD bonus tracks
No.	Title	Length
6.	"Flammende Herzen - Film Remix" (1993)	8:32
7.	"Vorbei (Flammende Herzen - Chill Remix)" (1993)	8:36

== Personnel ==
- Michael Rother - Guitar, Electric Piano, Bass, Synthesizer, Organ, Electric Percussion, Producer
- Jaki Liebezeit - Drums
- Conny Plank - Producer, Engineering
- Ann Weitz - Front Cover Photograph
- Christian Rabe - Back Photo
- Rike - Design
