= Blue (La! Neu? album) =

Studio album by La! Neu?
- Released: 1999
- Recorded: 1984–7
- Genres: Krautrock, post-punk, pop
- Label: Captain Trip Records
- Producer: Klaus Dinger

Klaus Dinger chronology
Live in Tokyo 1996 Vol. 2 (1999)	Blue (1999)	Live at Kunsthalle Düsseldorf (2001)

Blue is a 1999 studio album released under the La! Neu? name on Captain Trip Records. In most senses it is a Klaus Dinger solo album, as Dinger composed, produced, recorded and (mostly) performed the entire album alone. It was originally intended for release as the fifth La Düsseldorf album in 1987, but Dinger's contract with Virgin Records was terminated before the album's release. The 1987 rejection letter from Udo Lange is printed upside-down on the back cover of the CD.

== Name ==
The ambiguity of the album's name and artist on the cover has caused confusion amongst retailers as well as fans. Whilst "La! Neu?" is prominently displayed at the top-right corner of the artwork, the cover also features the legend "La Düsseldorf 5", referring to Dinger's band from the 1970s and '80s. Some have confused this legend with the album title – Blue – or been confused by references in the album booklet to "Five Pearls and a Hammer" – the album's original title. In fact, no members of La! Neu? or La Düsseldorf other than Dinger himself appear on the album, and the few extra musicians who do contribute come from Dinger's 1984 project Néondian. Some have argued that this makes the album – in effect – a Klaus Dinger solo album (like Néondian), but this is not referred to anywhere in the CD packaging.

== Background and recording ==
The album was recorded over a period of three years spanning 1984, 1985 and 1986. The lengthy version of "America" which closes the album was recorded first, during the sessions for Neondian (which features a shorter, synthesizer-based version of the song). This is the only track on the album to feature instrumentalists other than Dinger; namely Rüdiger "Spinello" Elze (of Kowalski) on guitar, Manfred "Charly" Therstappen on drums and Raoul Walton on bass (both of Belfegore). All three appeared on Neondian and Elze also contributed to the La! Neu? albums Year of the Tiger and Live at Kunsthalle Düsseldorf. The track was recorded electronically at Dinger's studios in Kamperland, Netherlands. Some time after the original recording, Dinger added whispered lead vocals which are dubbed in and out throughout the track alongside the original sung lyrics.

The album's first five tracks (originally planned to make up the A-side of an LP release) were recorded in 1985 and '86. "Arms Control Blues" is a spoken word track in which Dinger compares his idyllic life in Kamperland with the fraught negotiations between Ronald Reagan and Mikhail Gorbachev on nuclear arms control, at that time taking place in Geneva. The album's title track features Yvi Paas on vocals, a role she would reprise on Die Engel des Herrn. "Lilienthal" is an instrumental piece recorded in and named after Dinger's Düsseldorf studios, whilst "Touch You Tonight" is a short song influenced by The Rolling Stones. "Für Omi" is an instrumental eulogy to Dinger's grandmother, who died during the recording of the album.

Having mixed and mastered the album, in 1987 Dinger submitted the tape to his record company Virgin Records (where he had been moved following WMG's takeover of Teldec in 1986). Virgin were contracted to release one more Dinger album by an agreement made with Teldec in 1979. On 17 March he received a letter from Udo Lange – head of Virgin in Germany – declining to release the album: "If one is not one hundred-percent certain of a product, even in such favourable conditions, it should not be released". Dinger was thus dropped from WMG and forced to market his following album (Die Engel des Herrn) independently. The album was originally to be titled "Five Pearls and a Hammer" in reference to the six tracks; the first five being "pearls" and "America" being "a hammer".

By 1999 Dinger's relationship with Captain Trip Records, Tokyo allowed him to release many CDs relatively cheaply, and after meeting up with Spinello Elze in 1998 for the first time in years he decided to release Blue. He dedicated the album to Marion Paas, his partner since the early 1980s, as well as to his grandmother and parents. The CD booklet features photographs of Dinger and his family in Zeeland in the 1980s, including one of Dinger, Yvi and Marion on the beach which Dinger found being sold as a tourist postcard. Significantly, the booklet features the first contribution of Masaki Nakao to a Dinger album (a drawing of the Japanese symbol "Ai"). Nakao, who met Dinger in 1998, would be a major collaborator throughout the following decade before Dinger's death in 2008.

== Track listing ==
All tracks composed by Klaus Dinger, except where indicated.

1. "Arms Control Blues" – 7:05
2. "Blue (feat. Yvi)" – 4:45 (Klaus Dinger / Yvi Paas)
3. "Lilienthal" – 4:45
4. "Touch You Tonight" – 2:20
5. "Für Omi (For Granny)" – 2:13
6. "America" – 17:53

== Personnel ==
- Klaus Dinger – all instruments (tr. 1–5), vocals (tr. 1 & 3–6)
- Spinello Elze – guitar (tr. 6)
- Yvi Paas – vocals (tr. 2)
- Charly T. Charly [a.k.a. Manfred Therstappen] – drums (tr. 6)
- Raoul Walton – backing vocals, bass (tr. 6)
