= Katzenmusik =

Studio album by Michael Rother
- Released: 1979
- Recorded: March–July 1979, in Forst and Conny's Studio
- Genres: Krautrock, art rock
- Length: 39:14
- Label: Sky Records
- Producers: Michael Rother, Conny Plank

Michael Rother chronology
Sterntaler (1978)	Katzenmusik (1979)	Fernwärme (1982)

Katzenmusik is the third studio album by the German solo artist Michael Rother. It was released in 1979 and includes the single "Katzenmusik 9" b/w "Katzenmusik 2".

The album was recorded between March and July 1979 in Germany at Rother's own studio in Forst and Conny's Studio. Receiving positive reviews the album was released as an LP in 1979 before it was re-released by Polydor in 1982. The album was issued on CD in 1990, and then reissued again in 1993 with bonus tracks and having been remastered. The artwork for the album was designed by Rike with photography by Ann Weitz and Rother himself.

== Recording and music ==
Rother recorded Katzenmusik in conditions that were similar to his debut and second studio album, working again with Neu! and Harmonia producer Conny Plank and augmented with Jaki Liebezeit from Can on drums. Aside from Liebezeit, the entirety of the album was written and performed by Rother utilising guitar and electronic instrumentation. Rother reduced the palette of instrumentation and wrote the album essentially as a suite in two parts. Instead of clearly differentiated tracks the twelve pieces are variations layered around four different five-note melodies that recur either as single string statements triple-track or stark chords supporting them.

The album was the final collaboration between Rother and the producer Conny Plank. Plank had produced all of Rother's albums including his work with Neu! and Harmonia with the exception of Harmonia's debut 1974's Musik Von Harmonia. Rother is credited as the sole producer on his subsequent studio albums.

== Releases ==
Katzenmusik was first released on Sky Records as an LP in 1979. The album has been re-released several times, again as an LP on Polydor after Rother joined the label in 1982. In 1993, Rother secured the rights to his back catalogue and re-issued all of his solo albums with bonus tracks and remastered sound on his own label, Random Records. In 2000, Rother re-issued all of the albums again in partnership between Random Records and BSC Music. Expanded editions include the 1993-era tracks "Sweet Retro", "Doppelstern" and "Schlangentanz". The album has since been released in the US on Water Records and as a heavyweight 180 gram LP on the 4 Men With Beards imprint.

== Reception ==
Professional ratings
Review scores
Source	Rating
Allmusic	4.5/5 stars
Dusted Reviews	(Positive)

Katzenmusik received positive reviews by the majority of critics. Thom Jurek writing for Allmusic acclaims the album as one of Rother's best works: "singular in its achievement, a perfect melding of taste, dynamics, pace, melodic invention, and emotional and spiritual honesty, all woven into the spirit of rock & roll'.

== Track listing ==
All tracks are written by Michael Rother.

Side one
No.	Title	Length
1.	"Katzenmusik 1"	0:33
2.	"Katzenmusik 2"	4:06
3.	"Katzenmusik 3"	0:25
4.	"Katzenmusik 4"	3:09
5.	"Katzenmusik 5"	3:58
6.	"Katzenmusik 6"	2:41
7.	"Katzenmusik 7"	3:33
8.	"Katzenmusik 8"	2:22

Side two
No.	Title	Length
9.	"Katzenmusik 9"	4:20
10.	"Katzenmusik 10"	6:40
11.	"Katzenmusik 11"	3:03
12.	"Katzenmusik 12"	5:06

CD bonus tracks
No.	Title	Length
13.	"Sweet Retro"	2:23
14.	"Doppelstern"	5:20
15.	"Schlangentanz"	5:43

== Personnel ==
- Michael Rother - Guitar, Electronics, Producer, Cover Photograph
- Jaki Liebezeit - Drums
- Conny Plank - Producer, Recording
- Ann Weitz - Rear Cover Photograph
- Rike - Design
