= Sterntaler =

Studio album by Michael Rother
- Released: 1978
- Recorded: September 1977 – November 1977, in Forst and Conny's Studio
- Genre: Krautrock, art rock
- Length: 34:16
- Label: Sky
- Producer: Michael Rother, Conny Plank

Michael Rother chronology
| Flammende Herzen (1977) | Sterntaler (1978) | Katzenmusik (1979) |

Sterntaler is the second studio album by the German solo artist Michael Rother. It was released in 1978 and includes the single "Sterntaler" b/w "Sonnenrad".

The album was recorded between September and November 1977, in Germany at Rother's own studio in Forst and Conny's Studio. Receiving positive reviews the album was released as an LP in 1978 before it was re-released by Polydor in 1982. The album was reissued on CD in 1993 with bonus tracks and having been remastered. The artwork for the album was designed by Rike with photography by Ann Weitz.

== Recording and music ==
On completion of Flammende Herzen his debut solo album, Rother re-teamed with Cluster members Hans-Joachim Roedelius and Dieter Moebius and former-Roxy Music member and solo artist Brian Eno to record a third Harmonia album in Forst in 1976. The studio sessions were productive but the recordings were left unreleased until November 1997 when they were released as Tracks and Traces and credited to 'Harmonia 76'.

Rother recorded Sterntaler in conditions that were similar to his debut, working again with Neu! and Harmonia producer Conny Plank and augmented with Jaki Liebezeit from Can on drums. Aside from Liebezeit, the entirety of the album was written and performed by Rother utilising guitar, bass guitar, piano, synthesizer and electronic percussion. Rother also used Hawaiian slide guitar and synthesized strings, evident was an increased used on synthesizer for the main melody lines on a number of compositions most evident on the title track and an ambient drum-free approach on "Blauer Regen".

"Fontana Di Luna" was later re-recorded in 1990 as "Morning Sun", a song that was recorded in collaboration with Station 17 on their self-titled début album in 1990. Station 17 is a project that gives disabled people the opportunity to work as an artist in music, movie and video.

== Releases ==
Sterntaler was first released on Sky Records as an LP in 1978. The album has been re-released several times, again as an LP on Polydor after Rother joined the label in 1982. In 1993, Rother secured the rights to his back catalogue and re-issued all of his solo albums with bonus tracks and remastered sound on his own label, Random Records. In 2000, Rother re-issued all of the albums again in partnership between Random Records and BSC Music. Expanded editions include the 1993-era tracks "Lichter Von Kairo", "Patagonia Horizont" and "Südseewellen (Extended Dance Remix)". The album has since been released in the US on Water Records and as a heavyweight 180 gram LP on the 4 Men With Beards imprint. The 2000 edition runs a little slower than the original LP, whilst a 2007 edition runs faster.

== Reception ==
Professional ratings
Review scores
| Source | Rating |
|---|---|
| Allmusic | 4.5/5 stars |
| Dusted Reviews | (Positive) |
| Head Heritage | (Positive) |

Sterntaler received positive reviews by the majority of critics.

== Track listing ==
All tracks are written by Michael Rother.

Side one
| No. | Title | Length |
|---|---|---|
| 1. | "Sonnenrad" | 6:01 |
| 2. | "Blauer Regen" | 3:09 |
| 3. | "Stromlinien" | 8:11 |

Side two
| No. | Title | Length |
|---|---|---|
| 4. | "Sterntaler" | 6:46 |
| 5. | "Fontana Di Luna" | 6:39 |
| 6. | "Orchestrion" | 3:40 |

CD bonus tracks
| No. | Title | Length |
|---|---|---|
| 7. | "Lichter Von Kairo" (1993) | 6:44 |
| 8. | "Patagonia Horizont" (1993) | 6:08 |
| 9. | "Südseewellen (Extended Dance Remix)" (1993) | 5:08 |

== Personnel ==
- Michael Rother - Electric, Acoustic and Hawaiian Guitars, Piano, Bass, Vibraphone, Synthesizer, Strings, Producer, Recording
- Jaki Liebezeit - Drums
- Conny Plank - Producer, Recording
- Ann Weitz - Cover Photo
- Rike - Design
