= Dreaming (Michael Rother album) =

Studio album by Michael Rother
- Released: September 2020
- Recorded: 1995–2020 at Studio B3, Hamburg and Katzenmusik Studio, Forst
- Studio: Studio B3, Hamburg and Katzenmusik Studio
- Genre: Krautrock; art rock; ambient
- Length: 50:58
- Label: Grönland Records
- Producer: Michael Rother

Michael Rother chronology
Remember (The Great Adventure) (2004)	Dreaming (2020)	As Long As the Light (2021)

Dreaming is the tenth studio album by the German solo artist Michael Rother. It was released in September 2020. Aside from some soundtrack material during the 2010s (The Robbers and Houston), Dreaming is Michael Rother's first solo effort since Remember (The Great Adventure) was released in 2004. The album was constructed from leftover musical sketches and vocal samples of Sophie Joiner from the sessions for Remember (The Great Adventure).

The album was recorded between 1995 and 2020 in Germany at Rother's own Katzenmusik Studio in Forst and Studio B3, Hamburg. Receiving positive reviews the album was released as a CD, vinyl-LP and on digital formats. The artwork was designed by Walter Schönauer with cover photography from Michael Rother's family archive and additional photography by Rother and Vittoria Maccabruni. Music videos were produced for "Dreaming" and "Bitter Tang".

== Reception ==
Professional ratings
Review scores
Source	Rating
AllMusic	4/5 stars

Dreaming received positive reviews by the majority of critics. Paul Simpson, writing for Allmusic awarded the album four stars and writes, "on Dreaming, Rother fleshes out sketches dating from the Remember sessions, preserving some of that album's feel while fusing it with traces of his past work and pushing into further directions. He contrasts Joiner's "breezy, unforced flow provides an extra layer of comfort (and sometimes emotional pull) to Rother's languid, effervescent soundscapes". In a mixed review writing for Pitchfork, Dave Segal writes: "Dreaming is at its worst when it slips into the saccharine sentimentality of “Fierce Wind Blowing,” “Gravitas,” and “Quiet Dancing.” More often, though, Rother seems suited for his role as an elder hero transitioning into a late-career metamorphosis".

== Track listing ==
All tracks are written by Michael Rother.

No.	Title	Length
1.	"Dreaming"	6:42
2.	"Bitter Tang"	5:06
3.	"Fierce Wind Blowing"	5:10
4.	"Hey-Hey"	8:05
5.	"Wopp-Wopp"	3:58
6.	"Lovely Mess"	5:49
7.	"Out In The Rain"	5:17
8.	"Gravitas"	5:09
9.	"Quiet Dancing"	5:28

== Personnel ==
- Michael Rother – all instruments, producer, recording, mixing, photography
- Sophie Joiner – vocals (tracks: 1–4, 6, 7, 9)
- Thomas Beckmann – drum programming, mixing
- Tom Meyer – mastering (at Master & Servant)
- Walter Schönauer – design
- Vittoria Maccabruni – photography
