= Cha Cha 2000 - Live in Tokyo 1996 Vol. 1 =

Cha Cha 2000 – Live in Tokyo 1996 Vol. 1

Live album by La! Neu?
- Released: 1998
- Recorded: 3 December 1996, Tokyo
- Genre: Krautrock, post punk, art rock
- Label: Captain Trip Records
- Producer: Klaus Dinger

Klaus Dinger chronology
Rembrandt: God Strikes Back (1998)	Cha Cha 2000 – Live in Tokyo 1996 Vol. 1 (1998)	Goldregen (1998)

Cha Cha 2000 – Live in Tokyo 1996 Vol. 1 is a 1998 live album by the German group La! Neu?, recorded at a 1996 concert in Tokyo during the band's Japanese tour. The album consists of the second half of the 3½ hour concert, during which time the band played an extended 1¾ hour version of La Düsseldorf's 1978 song Cha Cha 2000 (which was written by La! Neu?'s frontman Klaus Dinger). The album is regarded as the pinnacle of La! Neu?'s and Dinger's artistic achievements by many, and continues to be the best selling album released by Captain Trip Records.

== Background to tour ==
In early 1996 Klaus Dinger and Michael Rother met in Düsseldorf to review their ongoing legal battle with Metronome Records for the rights to the three original Neu! albums which they made together in the 1970s. Metronome had offered to compromise with Dinger and Rother by giving the two musicians a sizable proportion of the profits made from a reissue of the albums and by financing promotional activities, possibly including a world tour. Whilst Dinger was willing to accept this offer, Rother was more hesitant, still hoping to secure full ownership of the recordings. In the meantime, Dinger spoke to Ken Matsutani (the head of Captain Trip Records which was at that time releasing Dinger's post-Neu! back catalogue), and Matsutani began looking for venues in Japan for the upcoming tour. Matsutani discovered two venues which were interested in hosting Neu! – Muse Hall in Osaka and On Air West in Tokyo. In early 1996 Cluster (a band associated with Neu! and particularly with Michael Rother) had visited both venues as part of a world tour and produced the album Japan 1996 Live from the result. Dinger and Neu! (like Cluster) had a comparatively large following in Japan, and it was anticipated that any Neu! concerts arranged would be well attended.

Michael Rother was unwilling to commit to a tour, however, much to Dinger's annoyance. Rather than back out of the conversations he was having with Tokyo and Osaka, Dinger decided to offer the services of a new group he had been building around Andreas Reihse of Kreidler and Victoria Wehrmeister of Superbilk. In reference to Neu! and La Düsseldorf he named the new band La! Neu?, and was quickly accepted by owner of the venues – Hirokazu Nambu (Dinger admitted that Nambu was taking a "risk" in inviting the unknown La! Neu?). In Germany he finalised the group's debut album Düsseldorf and prepared to take an extended 8-man line-up with him to Japan.

In the summer of 1996 Dinger was consumed with the organisation (by mail and fax) of an exhibition of his visual art in Auckland, New Zealand. Kerry Aberhart – the curator of the art gallery and a fan of Dinger's work – offered to fly to Japan in advance of La! Neu? to assist the group during their tour.

== Tour and concert setting ==
In late November 1996 Kerry Aberhart flew to Osaka and was met on 1 December by Ken Matsutani and members of Matsutani's band "Marble Sheep" (who had travelled from Tokyo). They "filled time drinking scotch in [Kerry's hotel] room" until Dinger and La! Neu? were due to arrive later that day. At 8:30 PM Aberhart and Marble Sheep travelled to the airport to meet La! Neu?, whose flight was slightly delayed. This was the first time Dinger had met his label head face-to-face, and the first time he had been to Japan.

They stayed overnight in Osaka (where it was snowing heavily) and performed at Muse Hall on 2 December. The stage had a rope stretched at shoulder-height across it, from which hung Japanese drums and bells which Dinger played during the concert along with his guitar. He was joined by drummers Thomas Klein and Markus Hofmann (both of Kreidler) as well as bassist and contrabassist Konstantin Wienstroer, guitarist Dirk Flader, vocalist Victoria Wehrmeister and keyboardists Andreas Reihse and Rembrandt Lensink. The concert went well, featuring much the same set list as the Tokyo concert.

The following day, the entourage travelled to Tokyo, arriving slightly behind schedule. The stage was set up in much the same way as in Osaka, with the addition of a 3m square La! Neu? banner created by artist Yuri Shibata. Before the concert the band dined on noodles. Concert tickets bore the cryptic legend "Psychedelic Originators For Space Age Vol. 6", and sold well.

== Performance ==
After a set featuring samples of Dinger's music from 1978 onwards, Dinger playfully asked the audience if they would "like a bit of cha-cha-cha", before starting the signature riff of Cha Cha 2000. Dinger incorporated samples of a conversation with his mother and several new lyrics to the song, the band playing for roughly an hour, at one point inviting audience members on stage to participate. At the hour mark the music was brought down and the song's middle section begun, in this version featuring contrabass and piano solos from Wienstroer and Lensink. A tribal drum beat provided by Hofmann and Klein gradually merged into the signature riff, before the concert concluded with layers of guitar feedback and Dinger's farewell to the audience. La! Neu? soon returned to Germany; Dinger carrying the tapes as well as a large collection of photographs and objects from Japan in his luggage.

== Production and mastering ==
The album was mastered by Dinger in February 1997. Some time before that, Dinger's home had been burgled and the video tapes of the concert stolen (along with memorabilia such as Yuri Shibata's banner). At the time of mastering, Dinger decided to reverse the order of the song's two halves, putting the last 50 minutes on disc 1 and the first hour on disc 2. He did this because—

...on first listen (and in general) I found the second half 'easier on the ear'. At least at that time, in February 1997, I found the first half very bitter and more suitable as a climax following on from part 2. By doing this I caused confusion (not bad in itself) and misinterpretation (e.g., the N.O.T.E.S. fanzine called disc 2 an encore) which I had not foreseen. Today I would have explained the swap in the [CD] booklet.

Dinger designed cover artwork in 1997 which was later scrapped in favour of a painting by Victoria Wehrmeister (although it survives as an inset at the bottom-right of Wehrmeister's image). He also pieced together an extensive booklet featuring photographs of the band in Japan and onstage and commentaries from Ken Matsutani and Kerry Aberhart. The album was released in March 1998 by Captain Trip Records. The first half of the concert would be released the following year under the title Live in Tokyo 1996 Vol. 2.

== Track listing ==
All tracks composed by Klaus Dinger
Disc 1

1. "Cha Cha 2000 part 2" – 46:40

Disc 2

1. "Cha Cha 2000 part 1" – 57:44

NOTE: for an explanation of the track list, see the section "Production & Mastering".

== Personnel ==
- Klaus Dinger – bamboos, bells, effects, gong, guitar, keyboard, sampling, taiko, vocals
- Renate Dinger (sampled) – voice
- Dirk Flader – guitar
- Markus Hofmann – drums
- Thomas Klein – drums
- Rembrandt Lensink – percussion, piano, synthesizer, vocals
- Andreas Reihse – electronics, keyboards, synthesizer
- Victoria Wehrmeister – tambourine, vocals
- Konstantin Wienstroer – bass, contrabass
