= Esperanza (Michael Rother album) =

Studio album by Michael Rother
- Released: 11 March 1996
- Recorded: January 1995 – January 1996 in Random Studio, Forst and Studio B3, and Hamburg/St. Pauli; December 1995 – January 1996 at Alphaton Studio, Wentorf
- Genres: Ambient; krautrock
- Length: 56:12
- Label: Random Records
- Producer: Michael Rother

Michael Rother chronology
Radio (1993)	Esperanza (1996)	Remember (The Great Adventure) (2004)

Esperanza is the eighth studio album by the German solo artist Michael Rother. It was released on 11 March 1996. Excepting 1993's compilation album Radio, the studio album was Rother's first since 1987 and his sole full release of material in the 1990s.

The album was recorded between January 1995 and January 1996 in Germany at Rother's own studio Random Studio in Forst and Studio B3, Hamburg. Additional recording and digital treatments took place at Alphaton Studio, Wentorf in December 1995 and January 1996. Receiving positive reviews the album was released as a CD and limited edition double LP in 1996 before it was re-released in 2000. The artwork and photography for the album was designed and shot by Thomas Beckmann.

== Recording and music ==
Esperanza was recorded and produced by Rother with only a small amount of assistance. This was in contrast to the majority of his 1980s work which Rother recorded alone. Jens Harke provided vocals and wrote the lyrics for "Weil Schnee und Eis", aside from the vocal samples on "Die Ganze Welt (World Mix)" (from Radio), the appearance of vocals on the song was a first for Rother's solo work. Joachim Rudolph contributed to the album in his programming of Pro Tools and DD-1000 computer software. The rest of the album was written and performed by Rother utilising electronic instrumentation. The entire album was digitally treated at Alphaton Studio, Wentorf along with additional recording on "Electra".

== Releases ==
Esperanza was first released on Random Records as CD and as double LP on 11 March 1996. The double LP was pressed on 150 gram and limited to 1000 copies, it includes bonus tracks dating from the sessions that produced the bonus tracks on Rother's 1993 re-issue campaign. The tracks included are "Nachtpassage (Chill Remix)", "Unterwasserwolken", "Südseewellen (Ambient Remix - 1993)" and "Nachtpassage (Ambient Night Mix)" In 2000, Rother re-issued all of the albums, including Esperanza, in partnership between Random Records and BSC Music.

== Reception ==
Professional ratings
Review scores
Source	Rating
Allmusic	4.5/5 stars

Esperanza received positive reviews by the majority of critics.

== Track listing ==
All tracks are written by Michael Rother, except "Weil Schnee und Eis" music by Michael Rother with lyrics by Jens Harke.

No.	Title	Length
1.	"Silver Sands"	3:29
2.	"Perlenklang"	3:36
3.	"Weil Schnee und Eis"	2:28
4.	"Esperanza"	3:30
5.	"Electra"	3:23
6.	"Wolkenwelt"	3:03
7.	"Kristall"	6:36
8.	"Singapore-Lore"	3:13
9.	"Heartbeat 67 BPM"	2:45
10.	"Loop-Loop"	4:17
11.	"Glox"	0:33
12.	"Gleitflug"	3:04
13.	"Travel"	3:02
14.	"Herzlicht"	3:23
15.	"One"	2:49
16.	"Sphinx"	3:41
17.	"Spirit of '72"	2:37

2xLP bonus tracks
No.	Title	Length
18.	"Nachtpassage (Chill Remix)"	3:51
19.	"Unterwasserwolken (1994)"	5:26
20.	"Südseewellen (Ambient Remix - 1993)"	5:35
21.	"Nachtpassage (Ambient Night Mix - 1994)"	4:12

== Personnel ==
- Michael Rother - All Instruments, Electronics, Producer
- Jens Harke - Vocals ("Weil Schnee und Eis")
- Joachim Rudolph - Pro Tools, DD-1000
- Achim Kruse - Digital Mastering
- Thomas Beckmann - Cover-Design, Photography
