= Broadcast 2000 =

Broadcast 2000 is an English acoustic indie-folk band, which centres around multi-instrumentalist songwriter and producer Joe Steer. As a live band Steer has been joined by various musicians including Tom Andrews (glockenspiel), Chris Banner (percussion), Pedro Del Battenberg (percussion), Louise Golbey (harmony vocals), Greg Cordez (double bass), Kelly Underdown (violin), Jade Brightwell (violin), Mikee Reed (violin), Sarah Triggs (viola) and Alex Eichenberger (cello).

The band's debut EP Building Blocks was written, recorded, mixed and mastered by Steer in the bedroom of his London flat. Steer has stated that he did not originally plan on being the lead vocalist, but recorded vocals on the tracks as a guide, with the intention of replacing them at a later stage.

The song "Get Up And Go", was used in a television advertisement in the UK for the energy supplier E.ON and is used in an ad for Volvo V60 in Scandinavia (2010). "Don't Weigh Me Down" was used in the opening scene of UK TV soap opera, Hollyoaks, episode aired on Channel 4 31 July 2008. "Pep Talk" was used in a movie trailer for the 2013 film Delivery Man starring Vince Vaughn. "Run" features on Apple's 2008 "MacBook Green" commercial and Bank of Scotland's 'With You All The Way' ad campaign in Scotland (2012). As of July 2009 the song "Rouse Your Bones" has been used to back UK charity Christian Aid in its 'Poverty Over' internet advertising campaign. The song "Get Up And Go" can be heard in the final scene of American TV show CSI: Crime Scene Investigation Season 10, episode 13, aired on CBS in US and Channel 5 in UK in 2010.

The band's debut album Broadcast 2000 was recorded by Steer, with additional production by Eliot James (who has previously worked with Kaiser Chiefs and Bloc Party amongst others) and features violin by Noah and the Whale's Tom 'Fiddle' Hobden. Songs from the album have received substantial radio airplay on BBC 6Music, BBC Radio 1, BBC Radio 2 and XFM. With live sessions on 6Music's Marc Riley and George Lamb shows as well as John Kennedy's XFM show. The band have also performed on the BBC Introducing stage at Glastonbury Festival 2010, SXSW music festival in Austin Texas, and as part of The Roundhouse Emerging Proms events in London.

== Discography ==
=== Albums ===
- Broadcast 2000 (Grönland Records, 15 February 2010)

=== EPs ===
- Building Blocks EP (Grönland Records, 25 August 2008)
