= Kira (German singer) =

German singer-songwriter

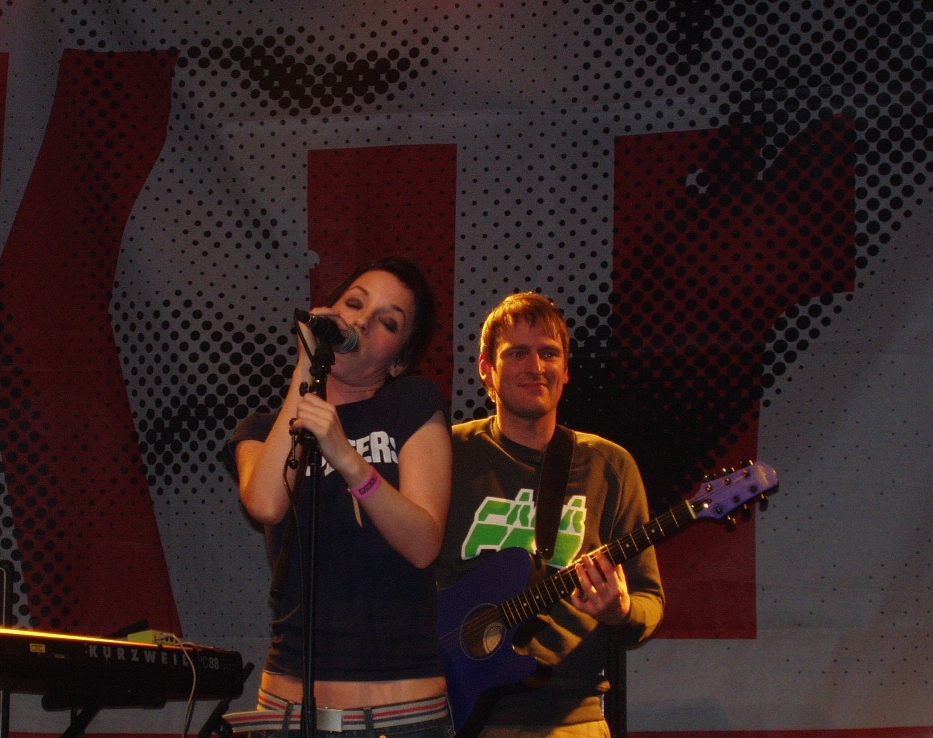
Kira in Vienna, 2005

Janine Scholz, better known by her simple stage name Kira, is a former German singer-songwriter who was born in Wuppertal on October 20, 1978.

== History ==
From the beginning of her musical development Kira had an unstoppable will to write her own music and songs. At the age of ten she started studying the violin, but after six years it became clear to her that she would not be able to develop herself on this instrument. She subsequently got a job at a metalworks factory and used her earnings to buy her first guitar and begin writing her songs. "If you write your own material," she has said, "there’s a personal meaning and the greatest sense of credibility behind every word and every note. And that’s also the most important factor for me—it doesn’t matter whether I’m listening to music or writing it. A song has to say something to me, be honest and touch me."

In her early years Kira often devoted more time to her guitar studies and songwriting than to her school work. With the help of her guitar teacher, she recorded one of her first songs and submitted it to a home recording competition in 1997. The material was passed on to Hamburg-based producer Michael Hagel, and Kira received feedback on it a year later. This considerably influenced her decision to set herself apart with her talent and her work, and also created an important mutual trust. Her work on new songs began. "I’ve always written my music and lyrics together," she has said. "At first [I wrote my lyrics] in English, but my producer took me aside again and again and wanted me to write something in German. As soon as I tried that, we were both immediately convinced by the result and the new feeling it generated." From then on she was no longer interested in writing English lyrics. "Today I can't imagine singing in English any more," she said in another interview years later. "I love my language and the many possibilities it offers me to express myself and to define who I am."

Kira’s confidence heightened her resolve to work even more strongly toward her music. As a result, in 2000 she decided to move from her home town, Wuppertal, to Hamburg. "I stopped going to school after twelfth grade," she has said. "It was difficult for me to leave my family, but I knew that everything would fizzle out if I didn’t take the next step." A year later she got a publishing deal from Freibank. She was subsequently interviewed by several record companies, all of whom expressed interest, but eventually were unwilling to unconditionally support the clear line of her music.

By lucky coincidence, however, Freibank had heard that the London, England-based label Grönland was looking for new German talent. In November 2002, at an appointment in London, Kira was introduced to the label’s founder, Herbert Grönemeyer, a singer in his own right. Kira’s singing and guitar-playing made such a huge impact on him that he signed her to the label four days later.

== Inauswendig ==
Her first album, Inauswendig, was released on October 25, 2004. "To be signed by him was like an accolade," she has said. "The great thing was that Herbert knew how easily he could have influenced my album with his experience and personality. But he didn’t do anything. He trusted me and left me to do it. That’s the greatest compliment he could give me."

Following the release of Inauswendig, critics soon started comparing her with Nena, a comparison Kira does not like at all. "It seems as though all dark-haired singers in Germany have to go through this," she told the German magazine Die Welt, "but I hate it."

== Goldfisch ==
After a string of appearances throughout 2005, including opening for Herbert Grönemeyer at the LTU Stadium in Düsseldorf in January, a multi-city tour with Virginia Jetzt in March and an appearance at the Schupfart Festival in Zürich in late September, Kira began recording her second album, Goldfisch, which was released on August 11, 2006. Whereas the themes of Inauswendig hover around introversion, the ego and the comparison of one’s reality to that of other people, the themes of Goldfisch hover around extroversion. "For me," she said in a press release, "these two albums are like two completely different worlds that have almost nothing at all to do with each other. They’re each based on a totally different attitude toward life."

After the release of Goldfisch, Kira made another string of appearances, including a multi-city tour with the German band Keimzeit in December 2006, her own "Fast wie Sommer" tour in the spring of 2007 (named for one of the songs on Goldfisch) and opening for Herbert Grönemeyer on four dates of his own tour in May and June.

That summer she appeared twice on the German TV channel GIGA-TV, a specialty channel devoted to digital lifestyles, once on their four-day special entitled Giga Island (which used her song "Fast wie Sommer" as its theme) and again as part of their coverage of the Internationale Funkausstellung (IFA), an annual consumer electronics show in Berlin.

== Third album and additional appearances ==
Kira began working on her third album in the fall of 2007. During its production she made several appearances, including a guest spot on the German radio station NDR's monthly show Hamburg Sounds (October 8, 2007) and relatively small-scale shows in Berlin and Hamburg in March and April 2008 respectively. Some of these shows were designed to try out new songs for the album. "New songs are like new varieties of chocolate," said an entry in the news section of Kira's web site in February. "They have to be tested and tasted before they can be firmly allowed to belong to the assortment."

Funding for the album was boosted by a support grant from the German government's recently introduced "Initiative Musik" program in early July 2008. Meanwhile, after happy years with Freibank, Kira switched to Wintrup Musikverlage as her publisher.

In the summer of 2008, Kira and other German artists were invited by the Goethe Institute to perform at a Chinese-German bi-cultural event in Guangzhou called "Deutschland und China--Gemeinsam in Bewegung" (Germany and China—Moving Forward Together), which started in Nanjing in August 2007 and ran in a succession of Chinese cities till October 2010. After her gig at this event, which took place on November 9, Kira performed at a number of universities in Chongqing.

Shortly after her return to Germany, her new tour, called "Deine Insel" (Your Island), was announced. It ran from March 26 to April 4, 2009 in a succession of several German cities, including Dresden, Hamburg, Wuppertal and Berlin. In time for the tour, Kira released an EP of the same title, which contains some of the songs intended for the third album. At the invitation of Initiative Musik, Kira returned to China in mid-June for a series of concerts in Shenyang, Beijing and Shanghai with the bands SuidAkrA and Vorzeigekinder. Kira's appearance in Shenyang on June 13, which was also at the invitation of the Goethe Institute, was part of the "Deutschland und China--Gemeinsam in Bewegung" event. Later that spring she was nominated for the Up-and-Coming Sponsorship prize at GEMA's German Music Author Awards.

Originally scheduled for release in the spring of 2009, and later pushed back to the fall, Kira's third album was later expected to be out some time in 2010. However, its production was halted in January 2011 when Kira decided to leave the music business, effectively ending her music career and making the Deine Insel EP her final release.

== Discography ==
=== Albums ===
- Inauswendig ("Inside and Out"). Released October 25, 2004.
- Goldfisch ("Goldfish"). Released in promo and commercial versions; the commercial version was released August 11, 2006.

=== EPs ===
- Deine Insel ("Your Island"). Sold at all of Kira's concerts during the "Deine Insel" tour.

=== Singles ===
- "Der Sog" ("The Maelstrom"), b/w "Meine Kleine" ("My Little One") and a video of "Der Sog". Released as a promo in 2004.
- "Alte Frauen" ("Old Women"), b/w "Zwanzig Tage" ("Twenty Days"). Released as a promo on September 13, 2004.
- "Filter" ("Filter"). Released as a promo in 2005 (the corresponding video was shot during Kira's Düsseldorf gig in January).
- "Wenn du den Himmel nicht aufmachst" ("If You Don't Open the Sky"). Released in promo and commercial versions; both versions contained the original album release of the song and a remix version. The commercial version of the single, including the B-side "Das Leben macht Sinn" ("Life Makes Sense"), was released on August 7.
- "Nie zu Hause"/"Rettungsboot" ("Never at Home"/"Lifeboat"). Released as a promo on August 31, 2006.
- "Fast wie Sommer" ("Almost Like Summer"). Released as a promo in 2007.
