= Remember (The Great Adventure) =

Studio album by Michael Rother
- Released: April 25, 2004 (EU); February 1, 2005 (US)
- Recorded: 1997–2004 in Random Studio, Forst and Studio B3, Hamburg/St. Pauli
- Genre: Krautrock; art rock; ambient
- Length: 54:23
- Label: Random Records, WEA, Gang Go Music
- Producer: Michael Rother

Michael Rother chronology
Esperanza (1996)	Remember (The Great Adventure) (2004)	Dreaming (2020)

Remember (The Great Adventure) is the ninth studio album by the German solo artist Michael Rother. It was released on 25 April 2004. The studio album was Rother's first since 1996 and his sole full release of material in the 2000s. It would take sixteen years till his next album. Dreaming was released in 2020.

The album was recorded between 1997 and 2004 in Germany at Rother's own studio Random Studio in Forst and Studio B3, Hamburg/St. Pauli. Receiving positive reviews the album was released as a CD in the EU in 2004 before it was released in the US in February 2005. The artwork was conceptualized by Thomas Beckmann and Michael Rother with photography from Michael Rother's archive.

== Recording and music ==
Remember (The Great Adventure) was recorded over a period of seven years, unusually for his solo work the album was recorded in collaboration with a number of musicians. Thomas Beckmann, Andi Toma, and Jake Mandell each program electrobeats. Asmus Tietchens provided the basic tracks for "Aroma Club B3". Most radically, the album features vocals on many of the songs by Sophie Williams and Herbert Grönemeyer. Rother's previous studio album had included vocals, however, Williams' and Grönemeyer's vocals are at the forefront of the mix. Many of Williams' lyrics were improvised in the studio, using a lyric book borrowed from her husband Paul Williams for inspiration. Aside from these collaborations the entirety of the album was written, performed, recorded, and produced by Rother utilising guitar, keyboards, and computers.

== Reception ==
Professional ratings
Review scores
Source	Rating
AllMusic	4/5 stars

Remember (The Great Adventure) received positive reviews by the majority of critics.

== Track listing ==
All tracks are written by Michael Rother; except "Aroma Club B3" written by Michael Rother and Asmus Tietchens.

No.	Title	Length
1.	"Energy It Up (Part 1)"	4:58
2.	"He Said"	7:12
3.	"Aroma Club B3"	4:41
4.	"Morning After (Loneliness)"	6:06
5.	"Sweet Sweat"	8:19
6.	"Nostalgia"	5:25
7.	"Remember"	5:32
8.	"Energy It Up (Part 2)"	6:20
9.	"Elevation No. 9"	5:54

== Personnel ==
- Michael Rother – All Instruments, Producer
- Sophie Williams – Vocals ("He Said", "Morning After (Loneliness)", "Sweet Sweat", "Energy It Up (Part 2)")
- Herbert Grönemeyer – Vocals ("Energy It Up (Part 1)", "Energy It Up (Part 2)", "Morning After (Loneliness)")
- Asmus Tietchens – Basic tracks on "Aroma Club B3"
- Thomas Beckmann – Electrobeats, Mixing ("Energy It Up (Part 2)")
- Andi Toma – Electrobeats ("Energy It Up (Part 1)")
- Jake Mandell – Electrobeats ("Elevation No. 9")
