= Zeeland (album) =

1997 album by La! Neu?

Zeeland (Live '97)

Studio album by La! Neu?
- Released: 1 December 1997
- Recorded: May–September 1997
- Length: 62:06
- Label: Captain Trip Records
- Producer: Klaus Dinger

Klaus Dinger chronology
Düsseldorf (1996)	Zeeland (Live '97) (1997)	Rembrandt: God Strikes Back (1998)

Zeeland (Live '97) is a studio album by German band La! Neu? recorded and released in 1997. It consists of a series of live jams recorded at Klaus Dinger's studio near Kamperland in the Dutch province of Zeeland. The album was produced and released quickly in comparison with its prequel Düsseldorf, which evolved over a period of two years. Zeeland was released on the Japanese record label Captain Trip Records, which released all of La! Neu?'s work.

== Recording, release and reception ==
After the recording and release of Düsseldorf, Dinger was anxious to continue his work with Andreas Reihse and Victoria Wehrmeister, and so travelled with them to his Dutch studios. Here they began an intensive period of "spontaneous and relatively unprepared" jamming, quickly constructing songs from riffs and drones. Dinger's mother Renate and his friend Rembrandt Lensink also contributed to the sessions, and are photographed along with Dinger, Reihse and Wehrmeister in the album booklet. Wehrmeister features far more on Zeeland than on Düsseldorf, taking most of the album's lead vocal parts.

Dinger mastered Zeeland at the same time as "Cha Cha 2000 - Live in Tokyo 1996 Vol. 1" in autumn 1997, although unlike Cha Cha Live, Zeeland would be released before the end of the year. Critically, Zeeland was a success, with Marc Jones of "Klangzeit" magazine calling it "close and peaceful – with an added smile".

== Track listing ==
1. "To Get You Real" – 9:14 (Klaus Dinger, Victoria Wehrmeister)
2. "Dank Je Sanne (For Not Erasing the Tune of Dank Je Sanne)" – 15:24 (K. Dinger, Andreas Reihse, Wehrmeister)
3. "Champagne" – 12:58 (K. Dinger, Reihse, Wehrmeister)
4. "Satellite of Mine" – 3:25 (K. Dinger, Reihse)
5. "Nippon Video Geisha" – 0:35 (Rembrandt Lensink, a sample from Lensink's album Rembrandt: God Strikes Back)
6. "Zeeland" – 2:07 (Renate Dinger)
7. "Insekt" – 6:37 (Reihse, Wehrmeister)
8. "Silly Face" – 11:46 (K. Dinger, Wehrmeister)

== Personnel ==
- Klaus Dinger – bells, effects, guitar, mixing, percussion, vocals
- Renate Dinger – piano, vocals (tr. 6)
- Rembrandt Lensink – sampling (tr. 5)
- Andreas Reihse – electronics, keyboards, synthesizers
- Victoria Wehrmeister – percussion, vocals
