= Goldregen =

Goldregen (Gold Rain)

Studio album by La! Neu?
- Released: 1998
- Recorded: 2–31 May 1998
- Genre: Krautrock, Ambient
- Label: Captain Trip Records
- Producer: Klaus Dinger

Klaus Dinger chronology
Cha Cha 2000 - Live in Tokyo (1998)	Goldregen (Gold Rain) (1998)	Year of the Tiger (1998)

Goldregen (Gold Rain) is the third album released in 1998 by German band La! Neu?. Like the previous year's Zeeland, Goldregen takes the form of a series of spontaneous jams, quickly recorded and mastered. Unlike Zeeland, Goldregen is entirely acoustic, containing only piano, violin, harmonium, drums and vocals. Unlike most other albums released by Klaus Dinger it is quiet and meditative rather than aggressive or abrasive; its low key and low-fi values arguable align it with ambient music.

== Background and recording ==
The album title is a play on words. The cover painting depicts a laburnum plant, which in German is called goldregen. Klaus Dinger's grand piano was made by a company called "Goldregen".

Recording began on 2 May 1998 at Klaus Dinger's studio in Düsseldorf, starting with the album's opener "Zeeland Wunderbar"; the only track to have been written before sessions began. It features Klaus Dinger's mother Renate on vocals and is a light-hearted, humorous track about life in Zeeland. On 27 May, Klaus and Victoria Wehrmeister convened in Dinger's Dutch studio to create three harmonium based tracks (which close the album), whilst Rembrandt Lensink and Thomas Dinger finalised "Zeeland Wunderbar" in Düsseldorf. Four days later the whole band met up in Düsseldorf to record tracks 2–9.

Goldregen was the first musical collaboration between the Dinger brothers since 1983; a product of their 1997 reunion following a long and bitter legal battle over the rights to La Düsseldorf. Klaus described Goldregen as a "family album". Despite this he also expressed regret that Andreas Reihse had not been able to join the sessions (due to commitments with Kreidler).

Klaus cited his musical influences for the record as including John Cale's Music for a New Society, the "almost sacred atmosphere" of that album being something he consciously tried to recreate on Goldregen.

== Track listing ==
1. "Zeeland Wunderbar" - 1:59 (Klaus Dinger, Renate Dinger)
2. "Rembrandt + Viktoria" - 3:32 (Rembrandt Lensink, Victoria Wehrmeister)
3. "Langsam Bewegt, Aber Nicht Traurig (Part 1 + 2)" - 6:44 (Lensink, Wehrmeister)
4. "Strathomaso" - 2:59 (K. Dinger, Thomas Dinger, Lensink)
5. "Where is the Geiger" - 0:57 (K. Dinger, Lensink)
6. "Shakesbeer/Shakesbier" - 4:33 (K. Dinger, T. Dinger, Lensink)
7. "Dinger Brothers mit Remmi + Wicki" - 5:13 (K. Dinger, T. Dinger, Lensink, Wehrmeister)
8. "How Could I Not Be" - 2:42 (K. Dinger, T. Dinger, Lensink, Wehrmeister)
9. "Light Blue Intermezzo" - 3:41 (Wehrmeister)
10. "Langweg 27 Mai" - 8:09 (K. Dinger, Wehrmeister)
11. "Klaus + Wicki" - 8:48 (K. Dinger, Wehrmeister)
12. "Comme Nuages Dans Le Ciel" - 8:17 (K. Dinger, Wehrmeister)

== Personnel ==
- Klaus Dinger - drums & percussion (tr. 1 & 4–8), harmonium (tr. 10–12), piano (tr. 1)
- Renate Dinger - vocals (tr. 1)
- Thomas Dinger - violin (tr. 4 & 6–8)
- Rembrandt Lensink - piano (tr. 2–8)
- Victoria Wehrmeister - drums & percussion (tr. 1 & 11), violin (tr. 2), piano (tr. 9), vocals (tr. 1–3, 7, 8 & 10–12)
