= Traumreisen =

Studio album by Michael Rother
- Released: 1987
- Recorded: January – July 1987 in Fernwärme Studio, Forst
- Genre: Krautrock, art rock
- Length: 34:50
- Label: Polydor
- Producer: Michael Rother

Michael Rother chronology
Süßherz und Tiefenschärfe (1985)	Traumreisen (1987)	Radio (1993)

Traumreisen is the seventh studio album by the German solo artist Michael Rother. It was released in 1987 and includes the single "Lichtermeer" b/w "Happy-End".

The album was recorded between January and July 1987 in Germany at Rother's own studio Fernwärme Studio in Forst. Receiving positive reviews the album was released as an LP, CD and Cassette in 1987. The album was reissued on CD in 1993 with bonus tracks and having been remastered. The artwork for the album includes photography by Ann Weitz.

== Recording and music ==
Traumreisen is the third studio album which Rother recorded without any assistance. The entirety of the album was written and performed by Rother utilising guitar and electronic instrumentation.

In the interim between the release of his previous album Süssherz & Tiefenschärfe and the recording of Traumreisen Rother reunited with Klaus Dinger to record a fourth album as Neu!. The recording sessions were fraught and difficult, and the material was unreleased until 1995. The Neu! sessions were eventually released by Dinger as Neu! 4, and in 2010 remixed and re-released by Rother as Neu! '86. Traumreisen bears little relation to the chaotic Neu! sound, and maintained the increasingly ambient and delicate tone of Rother's solo work.

== Releases ==
Traumreisen was first released on Polydor Records as an LP, CD and Cassette in 1987. In 1993, Rother secured the rights to his back catalogue and re-issued all of his solo albums with bonus tracks and remastered sound on his own label, Random Records. In 2000, Rother re-issued all of the albums again in partnership between Random Records and BSC Music. Expanded editions include the 1993-era tracks "Südseewellen – Radio Dance Remix", "Lucky Stars – Radio Dance Remix", "Trance-Atlantik" and "Südseewellen – Ambient Remix", and a longer version of "Reiselust" and "Lucky Stars" which runs for almost six minutes instead of four respectively three.

== Reception ==
Professional ratings
Review scores
Source	Rating
Allmusic	4/5 stars

Traumreisen received positive reviews by the majority of critics.

== Track listing ==
All tracks are written by Michael Rother

Side one
No.	Title	Length
1.	"Südseewellen"	7:01
2.	"Reiselust" (5:52 on re-issues)	4:06
3.	"Schwarze Augen"	4:52
4.	"Lucky Stars" (5:55 on re-issues)	3:03

Side two
No.	Title	Length
5.	"Lichtermeer"	5:08
6.	"Gloria"	5:58
7.	"Happy-End"	4:42

CD bonus tracks
No.	Title	Length
8.	"Südseewellen (Radio Dance Remix)" (1993)	3:48
9.	"Lucky Stars (Radio Dance Remix)" (1993)	3:59
10.	"Trance-Atlantik" (1993)	5:22
11.	"Südseewellen (Ambient Remix)" (1993)	5:35

== Personnel ==
- Michael Rother - All Instruments, Recorded by, Producer
- Ann Weitz - Photography
