= La! Neu? =

La! Neu? (stylized as la! NÊU?) were a German band founded by Klaus Dinger. After around 1985, Dinger had difficulty getting records released and distributed in Germany, but the Japanese record label Captain Trip Records signed him in 1994, setting up the Dingerland sub-label for Dinger's projects. La! Neu? is a loose collective of Dinger and (mostly) younger musicians, plus his mother Renate. Their records are recorded quite quickly and spontaneously, and the sleeve designs are usually by Dinger, with hastily handwritten liner notes and obvious glue drops.

La! Neu? is also used as an umbrella name for different projects from Dinger's friends; Rembrandt Lensink's solo album God Strikes Back, an album by the group Bluepoint Underground and the group Die With Dignity's album Kraut have all appeared under the La! Neu? name. The album Blue was originally meant as a follow-up to Dinger's solo album Neondian, but was rejected by the German record label (the rejection letter is reproduced on the back cover) and only issued a decade later.

Both La! Neu? and Dingerland have been inactive since 2001. Klaus Dinger's next planned project was a re-recording of La Düsseldorf's most successful album, Viva, using Japanese musicians, but he died in 2008.

== Core or recurrent members ==
- Klaus Dinger (voice, multi-instrumentalist, electronics)
- Renate Dinger (voice, piano)
- Viktoria Wehrmeister (voice, percussion)
- Dirk Flader (guitar)
- Thomas Klein (drums)
- Rembrandt Lensink (keyboards)
- Andreas Reihse
- Konstantin Wienstroer

== Discography ==
- (1996) Düsseldorf
- (1997) Zeeland
- (1997) Rembrandt: God Strikes Back
- (1998) Cha Cha 2000 - Live in Tokyo (2-CD)
- (1998) Goldregen (Gold Rain)
- (1998) Year of the Tiger
- (1999) Live in Tokyo 1996 Vol. 2 (2-CD)
- (1999) Blue (La Düsseldorf 5)
- (2001) Live at Kunsthalle Düsseldorf (2-CD)

== See also ==
- Neu!
- La Düsseldorf
- Kraftwerk
