= Fernwärme =

Album by Michael Rother

Studio album by Michael Rother
- Released: 1982
- Recorded: 1981 in Flammende Herzen Studio, Forst
- Genre: Krautrock, art rock
- Length: 36:23
- Label: Polydor
- Producer: Michael Rother

Michael Rother chronology
Katzenmusik (1979)	Fernwärme (1982)	Lust (1983)

Fernwärme is the fourth studio album by the German solo artist Michael Rother. It was released in 1982 and includes the singles "Silberstreif" b/w "Erlkönig" and "Hohe Luft" b/w "Fortuna".

The album was recorded in 1981 in Germany at Rother's own studio Flammende Herzen Studio in Forst. Receiving positive reviews the album was released as an LP and Cassette in 1982. In some English speaking territories, the album was retitled Silver Streak, which is the English translation of track one, "Silberstreif". The album was reissued on CD in 1994 with bonus tracks and having been remastered. The artwork for the album was designed by Rike with photography by Ann Weitz.

== Recording and music ==
Rother recorded Fernwärme augmented with Jaki Liebezeit from Can on drums. Aside from Liebezeit, the entirety of the album was written and performed by Rother utilising guitar and electronic instrumentation. The studio album was Rother's first without long-time collaborator Conny Plank, with whom he'd worked with on almost every project he had been involved in. The album was the final collaboration between Rother and the drummer Liebezeit. Liebezeit had played on each of Rother's first four solo albums. Rother predominantly utilised drum machines (already apparent on Fernwärme) on his subsequent studio albums.

== Releases ==
Fernwärme was first released on Polydor Records as an LP and Cassette in 1982. In some English speaking territories, the album was retitled Silver Streak, which is the English translation of track one, "Silberstreif" and released in 1986. In 1993, Rother secured the rights to his back catalogue and re-issued all of his solo albums with bonus tracks and remastered sound on his own label, Random Records. Fernwärme was re-released under Rother's new arrangement the following year in 1994. In 2000, Rother re-issued all of the albums again in partnership between Random Records and BSC Music. Expanded editions include the 1994-era tracks "Silencio", "Underwasserwolken" and "The Doppelgänger". The album has since been released in the US on Water Records and as a heavyweight 180 gram LP on the 4 Men With Beards imprint.

== Reception ==
Professional ratings
Review scores
Source	Rating
Allmusic	4/5 stars
Dusted Reviews	(Positive)

Fernwärme received positive reviews by the majority of critics.

== Track listing ==
All tracks are written by Michael Rother

Side one
No.	Title	Length
1.	"Silberstreif"	4:40
2.	"Elfenbein"	5:25
3.	"Erlkönig"	7:13

Side two
No.	Title	Length
4.	"Fortuna"	6:25
5.	"Klangkörper"	4:58
6.	"Hohe Luft"	4:54
7.	"Fernwärme"	3:18

CD bonus tracks
No.	Title	Length
8.	"Silencio" (1994)	4:55
9.	"Underwasserwolken" (1994)	5:26
10.	"The Doppelgänger" (1994)	6:24

== Personnel ==
- Michael Rother - Guitar, Electronics, Producer
- Jaki Liebezeit - Drums
- Ann Weitz - Rear Cover Photograph
- Rike - Design
