= Lust (Michael Rother album) =

Studio album by Michael Rother
- Released: 1983
- Recorded: 1983 in Sterntaler Studio, Forst
- Genres: Krautrock, art rock
- Length: 34:11
- Label: Polydor
- Producer: Michael Rother

Michael Rother chronology
Fernwärme (1982)	Lust (1983)	Süßherz und Tiefenschärfe (1985)

Lust is the fifth studio album by the German solo artist Michael Rother. It was released in 1983 and includes the single "Palmengarten" b/w "Cascadia".

The album was recorded in 1982 in Germany at Rother's own studio Sterntaler Studio in Forst. Receiving positive reviews the album was released as an LP and Cassette in 1983. The album was reissued on CD in 1994 with bonus tracks and having been remastered.

== Recording and music ==
Lust is the first studio album which Rother recorded without any assistance. Previously albums had utilised Jaki Liebezeit from Can on drums as well as co-production from Conny Plank. All of the material was written and performed by Rother utilising guitar and electronic instrumentation. Lust, which was Rother's first album with the Fairlight music computer, was compared to OMD.

== Releases ==
Lust was first released on Polydor Records as an LP and Cassette in 1983. In 1993, Rother secured the rights to his back catalogue and re-issued all of his solo albums with bonus tracks and remastered sound on his own label, Random Records. Lust was re-released under Rother's new arrangement the following year in 1994. In 2000, Rother re-issued all of the albums again in partnership between Random Records and BSC Music. Expanded editions include the 1994-era tracks "Blauer Delphin", "Gitarrero" and "Nachtpassage – Ambient Night Mix".

== Reception ==
Professional ratings
Review scores
Source	Rating
AllMusic	4/5 stars

Lust received positive reviews by the majority of critics.

== Track listing ==
All tracks are written by Michael Rother.

Side one
No.	Title	Length
1.	"Palmengarten"	4:54
2.	"Primadonna"	5:30
3.	"Dynamotron"	6:55

Side two
No.	Title	Length
4.	"Lust"	5:36
5.	"Cascadia"	5:08
6.	"Pulsar"	6:08

CD bonus tracks
No.	Title	Length
7.	"Blauer Delphin" (1994)	5:21
8.	"Gitarrero" (1994)	5:05
9.	"Nachtpassage – Ambient Night Mix" (1994)	4:12

== Personnel ==
- Michael Rother - Guitar, Keyboards, Fairlight, Bass, Producer
