= Tracks and Traces =

Compilation album by Harmonia 76
- Released: 4 November 1997; 21 September 2009 (reissue)
- Recorded: September 1976 at Harmonia Studio, Forst
- Genres: Krautrock; electronic; ambient; kosmische; experimental rock
- Length: 53:52; 64:01 (reissue)
- Labels: Rykodisc (US), S3; Grönland Records (reissue)
- Producers: Brian Eno, Harmonia

Harmonia chronology
Deluxe (1975)	Tracks and Traces (1997)	Live 1974 (2007)

Reissue cover
- 2009 reissue artwork

Tracks and Traces is a collaborative album by German kosmische supergroup Harmonia (featuring Neu! guitarist Michael Rother and Cluster members Hans-Joachim Roedelius and Dieter Moebius) and British musician Brian Eno, initially credited to Harmonia 76. Eno joined the group at Harmonia's studio in Forst, Germany for the September 1976 recording sessions.

The results remained unreleased until November 1997, when they were compiled by the American Rykodisc label (originally in Germany by the label S3, remastered by Eric Spitzer-Marlyn and Othmar Eichinger). In 2009, a reissue featuring additional tracks and alternative artwork was released, this time credited to Harmonia & Eno '76.

== Background and releases ==
Upon hearing Harmonia in the early 1970s, Eno proclaimed them "the most important band in the world." He eventually joined Harmonia on stage in 1974 at The Fabrik in Hamburg, and promised to join them at their Forst recording studio to record with them. After Harmonia had effectively disbanded, they briefly reunited to work with Eno at Forst in 1976. Eno joined the sessions for eleven days, shortly before traveling to work with David Bowie on his Berlin albums.

In the 1990s, Roedelius retrieved the session tapes from Eno and refashioned them into the 1997 release. He also reworked two pieces of music which were created, at the very beginning of the Harmonia collaboration/friendship with Brian Eno, but never finished. The two songs titled "Captured By Letters" and "Long Run", were modified and defined by Roedelius for use in two theaterplays. The songs were released on his 1994 album; Theatreworks.

=== 2009 reissue ===
Tracks and Traces was remastered and reissued in 2009 by Grönland Records. The new release featured three additional recordings from the sessions, sourced from Rother's own tape cassettes, which were unsuitable for release until digital technology made it possible to clean up the cassette recordings. It also featured new artwork. It was credited to Harmonia & Eno '76. A 12" of remixes was also released, coupling "Sometimes in Autumn" and "By The Riverside" re-fixed by producers Shackleton and Appleblim/Komonazmuk. In 2010 a full album of remixes was released.

== Reception ==
Professional ratings
Aggregate scores
Source	Rating
Metacritic	74 (6 Reviews)
Review scores
Source	Rating
Allmusic	(original release)
Drowned in Sound	(8/10) (reissue)
PopMatters	(reissue)
Pitchfork	7.6/10 (reissue)
Paste	(8.0/10) (reissue)
Resident Advisor	4.5/5 (reissue)

Ned Raggett, writing for Allmusic, describes Eno as "the wild-card factor who turned out to be a perfect addition," adding: "If there's less of the glittering glaze of the earlier Harmonia albums, the explorations in ambient sound and mysterious and murky textures make for a more than fair exchange" Todd L. Burns of Resident Advisor stated: "Most of it is idyllic, and most of it is extraordinarily ahead of its time," describing the album as "the sound of four legends at their artistic peak finding new forms of expression, finally presented properly."

== Track listing ==
Music written, performed and produced by Brian Eno, Hans-Joachim Roedelius, Michael Rother and Dieter Moebius. "Luneburg Heath" vocals and lyrics by Brian Eno.

=== 1997 release (Rykodisc/S3) ===
1. "Vamos Companeros" – 4:32
2. "By the Riverside" – 9:31
3. "Luneburg Heath" – 4:53
4. "Sometimes in Autumn" – 15:49
5. "Weird Dream" – 6:39
6. "Almost" – 5:28
7. "Les Demoiselles" – 3:59
8. "When Shade Was Born" – 1:30
9. "Trace" – 1:31

=== 2009 reissue (Grönland Records) ===
1. "Welcome" – 3:01
2. "Atmosphere" – 3:24
3. "Vamos Companeros" – 4:32
4. "By the Riverside" – 9:31
5. "Luneburg Heath" – 4:53
6. "Sometimes in Autumn" – 15:49
7. "Weird Dream" – 6:39
8. "Almost" – 5:28
9. "Les Demoiselles" – 3:59
10. "When Shade Was Born" – 1:30
11. "Trace" – 1:31
12. "Aubade" – 3:33

=== 2010 Tracks and Traces Remixed (Grönland Records) ===
1. "By the Riverside (Appleblim & Komonazmuk Remix)" – 7:49 (Remixed by Keiran Lomax and Laurie Osborne)
2. "Luneburg Heath (The Field Remix)" – 10:23 (Remixed by The Field)
3. "Sometimes in Autumn (Shackleton Remix)" – 10:26 (Remixed by Shackleton)
4. "Almost (Burger/Voigt Remix)" – 7:26 (Remixed by Jörg Burger and Wolfgang Voigt)
5. "Vamos Companeros (Modularsystem Remix)" – 5:14 (Remixed by Hannes Talirz and Stefan Pfeffer)
6. "Sometimes In Autumn (MITMIX)" – 8:23 (Remixed by Mit)

== Personnel ==
- Michael Rother – e-guitar, keyboards, drum machine
- Dieter Moebius – synthesizer, mini harp
- Hans-Joachim Roedelius – keyboards
- Brian Eno – synthesizer, e-bass, voice, lyrics
