= Deluxe (Harmonia album) =

Studio album by Harmonia
- Released: 20 August 1975
- Recorded: June 1975
- Genres: Krautrock; electronic; kosmische musik; ambient
- Length: 42:16
- Label: Brain
- Producers: Harmonia, Conny Plank

Harmonia chronology
Musik von Harmonia (1974)	Deluxe (1975)	Tracks and Traces (1997)

Singles from Deluxe
- 1. "De Luxe (Immer Wieder) / Monza (Rauf Und Runter)" Released: October 1975

Deluxe is the second album from the West German krautrock group Harmonia, consisting of Neu! guitarist Michael Rother and the Cluster duo of Hans-Joachim Roedelius and Dieter Moebius. It was recorded in June 1975 in Harmonia's studio in Forst, Germany. It was first released on the Brain Records label in 1975.

Deluxe was produced by the band members and Conny Plank. The trio were also joined by drummer Mani Neumeier for the release. It was officially reissued in 2004 by Universal.

== Background ==
For Deluxe, Harmonia worked with producer Conny Plank (who had previously worked with both their main projects Cluster and Neu!). He brought a 16-track recording machine and mixing desk to the band's country studio. Plank brought along drummer and Guru Guru member Mani Neumeier to perform on several tracks. Deluxe emphasized Rother's rock and pop sensibility over Cluster's more improvisational approach, which led to some creative tension between the members.

== Reception ==
Professional ratings
Review scores
Source	Rating
Allmusic	4.5/5 stars
Pitchfork	9.0/10

Ned Raggett's review for Allmusic describes the album as "a touch more immediate and song-oriented than its predecessor, but no less enchanting and lovely to hear," noting that "the motorik pulses and rhythms, however soft and subtle, still dominate the proceedings, while the glazed, warm feeling of the whole album is astounding." PopMatters called the album "a deeply beautiful record that redefines the word meditative and shimmers with breathtaking passages of unhurried, received music." Less positively, writer David Stubbs opined that "by comparison with the first album it feels just a little too light, lacking the gravitational pull of Moebius and Roedelius's influence; they feel like guests on what is more a Michael Rother album—a fine one, to be sure [...] but the hearts of the Cluster duo were in it less and less."

Musician, writer, and rock historian Julian Cope included Deluxe in his Krautrock Top 50.

== Releases ==
CDs of Deluxe first appeared in 1994 on the Germanofon label. This dubious company based in Luxembourg released numerous Krautrock albums without proper authorization or paying royalties, in effect producing bootlegs that somehow found their way into mainstream distribution. The Germanofon CDs were transfers from vinyl LPs and generally were of inferior sound quality. The album was not properly released on CD until 24 October 2004 on the Motor Music label, a subsidiary of the Universal Music Group. It was also reissued by Universal in Japan in 2005, by the Russian label Lilith in 2006, and by the Revisited Records label in 2007.

== Track listing ==
Music and concept by Michael Rother, Hans-Joachim Roedelius and Dieter Moebius

1. "Deluxe (Immer Wieder)" ("Deluxe (Again and Again)") – 9:45
2. "Walky-Talky" – 10:35
3. "Monza (Rauf und Runter)" ("Monza (Up and Down)") – 7:07
4. "Notre Dame" – 4:15
5. "Gollum" – 4:35
6. "Kekse" ("Biscuits") – 5:35

== Personnel ==
Harmonia

- Hans-Joachim Roedelius – keyboards, vocals
- Michael Rother – guitars, keyboards, vocals
- Dieter Moebius – synthesizer, Nagoya harp, vocals

with:

- Mani Neumeier – drums

== Covers ==
The band The Secret Machines made a cover of "Deluxe (Immer Wieder)" on their 2005 EP The Road Leads Where It's Led.
