= Süßherz und Tiefenschärfe =

Studio album by Michael Rother
- Released: 1985
- Recorded: November 1984 – February 1985 in Katzenmusik Studio, Forst
- Genre: Krautrock, art rock
- Length: 43:24
- Label: Polydor
- Producer: Michael Rother

Michael Rother chronology
Lust (1983)	Süßherz und Tiefenschärfe (1985)	Traumreisen (1987)

Süßherz und Tiefenschärfe is the sixth studio album by the German solo artist Michael Rother. It was released in 1985 and includes the singles "Süssherz" b/w "Maus-Mann-Motiv Nr. 4" and "Glitzerglanz" b/w "Rapido".

The album was recorded between November 1984 and February 1985 in Germany at Rother's own studio Katzenmusik Studio in Forst. Receiving positive reviews the album was released as an LP, CD and Cassette in 1985. The album was reissued on CD in 1994 with revised artwork, bonus tracks and having been remastered. The original artwork for the album was designed by Rike with illustration by Harald Hoffman.

== Recording and music ==
Süßherz und Tiefenschärfe is the second studio album which Rother recorded without any assistance. The entirety of the album was written and performed by Rother utilising guitar and electronic instrumentation.

Soon after the release of the album Rother reunited with Klaus Dinger to record a fourth album as Neu!. The recording sessions were fraught and difficult, and the material was unreleased until 1995. The Neu! sessions were eventually released by Dinger as Neu! 4, and in 2010 remixed and re-released by Rother as Neu! '86. Rother returned to his solo work and released his follow up to Süßherz und Tiefenschärfe in 1987.

== Releases ==
Süßherz und Tiefenschärfe was first released by Polydor as an LP, CD and Cassette in 1985. In 1993, Rother secured the rights to his back catalogue and re-issued all of his solo albums with bonus tracks and remastered sound on his own label, Random Records. Süßherz und Tiefenschärfe was re-released under Rother's new arrangement the following year in 1994. In 2000, Rother re-issued all of the albums again in partnership between Random Records and BSC Music. Expanded editions include the 1994-era tracks "Weserwellen" and "Weites Land".

== Reception ==
Professional ratings
Review scores
Source	Rating
Allmusic	4.5/5 stars

Süßherz und Tiefenschärfe received positive reviews by the majority of critics.

== Track listing ==
All tracks are written by Michael Rother

Side one
No.	Title	Length
1.	"Süßherz"	5:40
2.	"Tiefenschärfe"	13:38

Side two
No.	Title	Length
3.	"Glitzerglanz"	4:52
4.	"Rapido"	7:01
5.	"Daisy"	6:38
6.	"Blaues Licht"	5:36

CD bonus tracks
No.	Title	Length
7.	"Weserwellen" (1994)	4:55
8.	"Weites Land" (1994)	6:05

== Personnel ==
- Michael Rother - All Instruments, Recorded by, Producer
- H & vF - Cover Concept
- Harald Hoffan - Illustration
- Rike - Layout, Typography
