= Musik von Harmonia =

Studio album by Harmonia
- Released: January 1974
- Recorded: June–November 1973
- Genre: Krautrock; kosmische; electronic; ambient; experimental rock
- Length: 42:05
- Label: Brain
- Producer: Harmonia

Harmonia chronology
Musik von Harmonia (1974)	Deluxe (1975)

Musik von Harmonia is the debut album from the influential German krautrock group Harmonia, released in January 1974 by Brain Records. Formed by the addition of Neu! guitarist Michael Rother to Cluster (the duo of Hans-Joachim Roedelius and Dieter Moebius), they recorded the album from June to November 1973 in Cluster's Forst recording studio. It was self-produced by the group using a primitive mixer and three tape recorders.

== Background ==
In 1973, Cluster were living in the rural West German village of Forst when Neu! guitarist Michael Rother visited, hoping the duo would serve as a backing band for Neu! live performances. Upon jamming with Moebius and Roedelius, Rother claimed that "it was sort of a musical love at first sight, really [...] it was just something I hadn’t experienced before." He dropped his plans and remained in Forst to record with the duo as Harmonia. Rother would also bring some of his equipment, including Farfisa organs, a stereo mixer, and an Elka Drummer One rhythm machine.

The LP's pop art-styled sleeve artwork was designed by Moebius and resembles an advertisement for a cleaning fluid.

== Releases ==
It was first released on the Brain Records label in 1974. In 1979 the album was reissued by Brain under the name Dino with different artwork. There was an official CD release from German Polygram in 1992, which was deleted fairly quickly. 1994 saw the appearance of CDs on the Germanofon label. This dubious company, supposedly based in Luxembourg, released numerous Krautrock albums without proper authorization or paying royalties, in effect producing bootlegs that somehow found their way into mainstream distribution. The Germanofon CDs were transfers from vinyl LPs and generally were of inferior sound quality.

There were official Japanese releases (again from Polygram) in the late 1990s and early 2000s, but the next official Western CD release was not until 23 February 2004 on the Motor Music label, a subsidiary of the Universal Music Group (which had taken over from Polygram in the meanwhile). It was also reissued in 2005 by the Russian label Lilith, and by the Revisited Records label in 2007.

In October 2024 Musik von Harmonia was re-issued as a 50th Anniversary Edition by Groenland records. The cover has a green bottle instead of the original blue bottle. The release included reworks by different artists who were inspired by the album.

== Critical reception ==
Professional ratings
Review scores
Source	Rating
AllMusic	4.5/5 stars
Head Heritage	very favourable
Pitchfork Media	8.5/10
Uncut	very favourable

Ned Raggett's review for AllMusic opens: "The debut Harmonia album is at once a product of their source bands and a fine new twist on them, resulting in music that captures what for many is the Krautrock ideal..." He adds, "...it's at once playful and murky, steady and mechanical, a supergroup of sorts who easily achieves and maintains such a seemingly overstated status by embracing a variety of approaches that work wonders." Uncut named the album and its 1975 successor Deluxe as "among the best Krautrock had to offer, gentler than Can or Faust, but with their shimmering keyboards and mechanical rhythms, every bit as compelling.Artforum described the album as "a series of sonic vignettes in which the anarchic impulses of Kluster/Cluster were refined and channeled into controlled, Apollonian mechanics and repetitive electronic melodies with soft, synthetic textures."

Pitchfork stated that the group's debut "was a precise meeting of their constituent parts—Roedelius’ eerie beauty, Möbius’ sense of tension, Rother’s cool exploration—with each member contributing to the sound equally." It was Musik von Harmonia that reportedly had Brian Eno proclaiming that Harmonia was "the world's most important rock band" at the time. Daniel Dumych writes: "Perhaps Eno's reason for praising Harmonia so highly was that their music fit the requirements of ambient rock. Its music was equally suitable for active or passive listening. The careful listener found his/her attentions rewarded by the musical activities and sounds, but Harmonia's music was also capable of setting a sonic environment."

Musician, writer, and rock historian Julian Cope includes Musik von Harmonia in his Top 50 Krautrock albums.

== Track listing ==
All tracks written by Dieter Moebius, Hans-Joachim Roedelius and Michael Rother

1. "Watussi" ("Watusi") – 6:00
2. "Sehr Kosmisch" ("Very Cosmic") – 10:50
3. "Sonnenschein" ("Sunshine") – 3:50
4. "Dino" – 3:30
5. "Ohrwurm" ("Earworm") – 5:05
6. "Ahoi!" ("Ahoy!") – 5:00
7. "Veterano" ("Veteran") – 3:55
8. "Hausmusik" ("House-Music") – 4:30

== Personnel ==
Harmonia

- Hans-Joachim Roedelius – organ, piano, guitar, electric percussion
- Michael Rother – guitar, piano, organ, electric percussion
- Dieter Moebius – synthesizer, guitar, electric percussion
