= Rembrandt: God Strikes Back =

Studio album by La! Neu?
- Released: 1 December 1997
- Recorded: 1997
- Length: 67:38
- Label: Captain Trip Records
- Producer: Rembrandt Lensink & Klaus Dinger

Klaus Dinger chronology
| Zeeland (1997) | Rembrandt: God Strikes Back (1997) | Cha Cha 2000 - Live in Tokyo 1996 Vol. 1 (1998) |

Rembrandt: God Strikes Back is a 1997 electronic album released under the La! Neu? name. Despite this it is in most senses a solo album by La! Neu?'s pianist Rembrandt Lensink, who is the sole composer and performer on all but one track. It was recorded using Lensink's synthesizer at his home studio in Arnhem, Netherlands. The album's name has caused confusion with the releases of La! Neu? proper, although the CD booklet makes clear that the album's "main title" is God Strikes Back and "Rembrandt" Lensink's artist title.

== Background and recording ==
Klaus Dinger's association with Captain Trip Records allowed him to release many albums relatively cheaply, and he vowed to use this facility to give his friends a chance to release their recordings. Rembrandt Lensink had played piano during La! Neu?'s Japanese tour in 1996, and had become interested in releasing an album of ambient synthesizer tracks abiding by the "Less is More" ethic.

Lensink recorded 25 improvised tracks on his synthesizer, describing the album as "a one instrument direct recording without computer, external sequencer or multi-track mixing" and "a spontaneous compilation of noise events". Despite this, the track "New York Grand Master Trash Can" features Klaus Dinger playing guitar over Lensink's synthesizer track, for which Dinger received a co-credit.

== Content and reception ==
The album is a concept album in many ways. The religious sentiment in the title refers to a millenarianist belief – ironic or sincere – in the Christian God's revenge on society for its immorality. The album comments on this by including a sound clip of Pope John Paul II speaking ("Papst Johannes Paul II") as well as an audio excerpt from a Japanese pornography film ("Nippon Video Geisha"), amongst other things. Many instrumental tracks are conceptual, such as "440 Herz", which consists of an 8-second synthesizer tone, or "Die kranke Eule", which features owl-like sound effects.

The album was not well received by critics, who disliked its amateurish and minimal nature, although it has stayed in print longer than many other La! Neu? releases.

== Track listing ==
All tracks composed by Rembrandt Lensink, except where indicated.

1. "H_{2}O Cantate" – 1:17
2. "Techno Billy I" – 2:46
3. "39°C ohne Eselin" / "102.2°F without she-ass" – 0:50
4. "Techno B. II" – 2:51
5. "Nippon Video Geisha" – 0:29
6. "T. B. III" – 0:18
7. "Papst Johannes Paul II" – 0:20
8. "Sun and Moon in conjunction" – 0:25
9. "Jerusalem 2000" – 0:12
10. "S and M in conjunction II" – 0:55
11. "Johannes Paul III" (John Paul III) – 0:04
12. "God Strikes Back I" – 2:35
13. "God Strikes Back II" – 2:46
14. "God Strikes Back III" – 1:22
15. "Die kranke Eule" / "The Sick Owl" – 2:53
16. "Frog in UFO" – 2:17
17. "H_{2}O II" – 3:43
18. "Frog Takes Off" – 1:46
19. "Synthesizer Leiser" – 4:21
20. "440 Herz" – 0:08
21. "Radio Vaticana" – 5:40
22. "New York Grand Master Trash Can" – 2:40 (Klaus Dinger, Rembrandt Lensink)
23. "Und dann?" / "So what?" – 11:39
24. "Information Overload" – 8:13
25. "Kiss Me Stupid!" – 7:08

Note: Several of the tracks on the album form series (i.e. "God Strikes Back I", "God Strikes Back II" and "God Strikes Back III"), and some of the series track titles are abbreviated. For example, "T. B. III" is the third instalment of "Techno Billy I". Several of the track titles also feature English translations of their German names, which is indicated above by a slash (/).

== Personnel ==
- Klaus Dinger – guitar (tr. 22)
- Rembrandt Lensink – synthesizers (CR02 tr. 1-20; DCC tr. 21, 24 & 25; DAT tr. 22 & 23)

All tracks recorded at Arnhem, Netherlands except tr. 22 & 23, recorded in Düsseldorf, Germany.
