= Forst, Lower Saxony =

Forst
- Ortsteil of Bevern
- Interactive map of Forst
- Location within Germany Location within Lower Saxony
- Coordinates: 51°52′45″N 9°28′17″E
- Country: Germany
- State: Lower Saxony
- District: Holzminden
- Municipality: Bevern
- Time zone: UTC+01:00 (CET)
  - Summer (DST): UTC+02:00 (CEST)

Forst is a district of the municipality Bevern, Lower Saxony, Germany.

Forst lies in the Weser Uplands.

In the 1970s, the krautrock musicians Hans-Joachim Roedelius, Dieter Moebius and Michael Rother lived there.
