= Harmonia (band) =

German band

- Harmonia: Roedelius (top), Rother (left), and Moebius in Forst, Germany circa 1976.

Background information
- Origin: Forst, Germany
- Genres: Krautrock; electronic; kosmische; experimental rock
- Years active: 1973–1976; 2007–2009
- Labels: Brain; Grönland; Water
- Formerly of: Neu!, Cluster, Kluster, Brian Eno
- Past members: Michael Rother; Hans-Joachim Roedelius; Dieter Moebius; Mani Neumeier; Brian Eno
- Website: Official website

Harmonia was a West German musical "supergroup" formed in 1973 as a collaboration between members of two prominent krautrock bands: Cluster's Hans-Joachim Roedelius and Dieter Moebius joined by Neu! guitarist Michael Rother. Living and recording in the rural village of Forst, the trio released two albums—Musik von Harmonia (1974) and Deluxe (1975)—to limited sales before dissolving in 1976. AllMusic described the group as "one of the most legendary in the entire krautrock/kosmische scene."

In 1997, a series of shelved 1976 collaborations between Harmonia and British musician Brian Eno saw release as Tracks and Traces; it was reissued with more unearthed material in 2009. Following the release of the live album Live 1974 (2007), the trio reformed between 2007 and 2009. In 2015, Grönland Records released the 6-disc box set Complete Works, featuring remastered recordings and archival material.

== History ==
=== Formation: 1973-1975 ===
In 1971, the duo of Moebius and Roedelius, members of Cluster, moved to the rural West German village of Forst near the Weser River after being offered residence in several centuries-old farmhouses by an antiquarian who hoped to establish an artist's commune there. Michael Rother put his project Neu! on hold in early 1973 to meet with Roedelius and Moebius, hoping they might act as a backing band for live Neu! performances. Upon jamming with the duo, Rother claimed that "it was sort of a musical love at first sight, really [...] it was just something I hadn’t experienced before. In good moments, the three of us could produce a real, live music." Together the trio recorded in their own home studio in Forst, and chose the name Harmonia partially as a joking reference to the common German phrase for "choir." The idyllic, natural surroundings would influence their work.

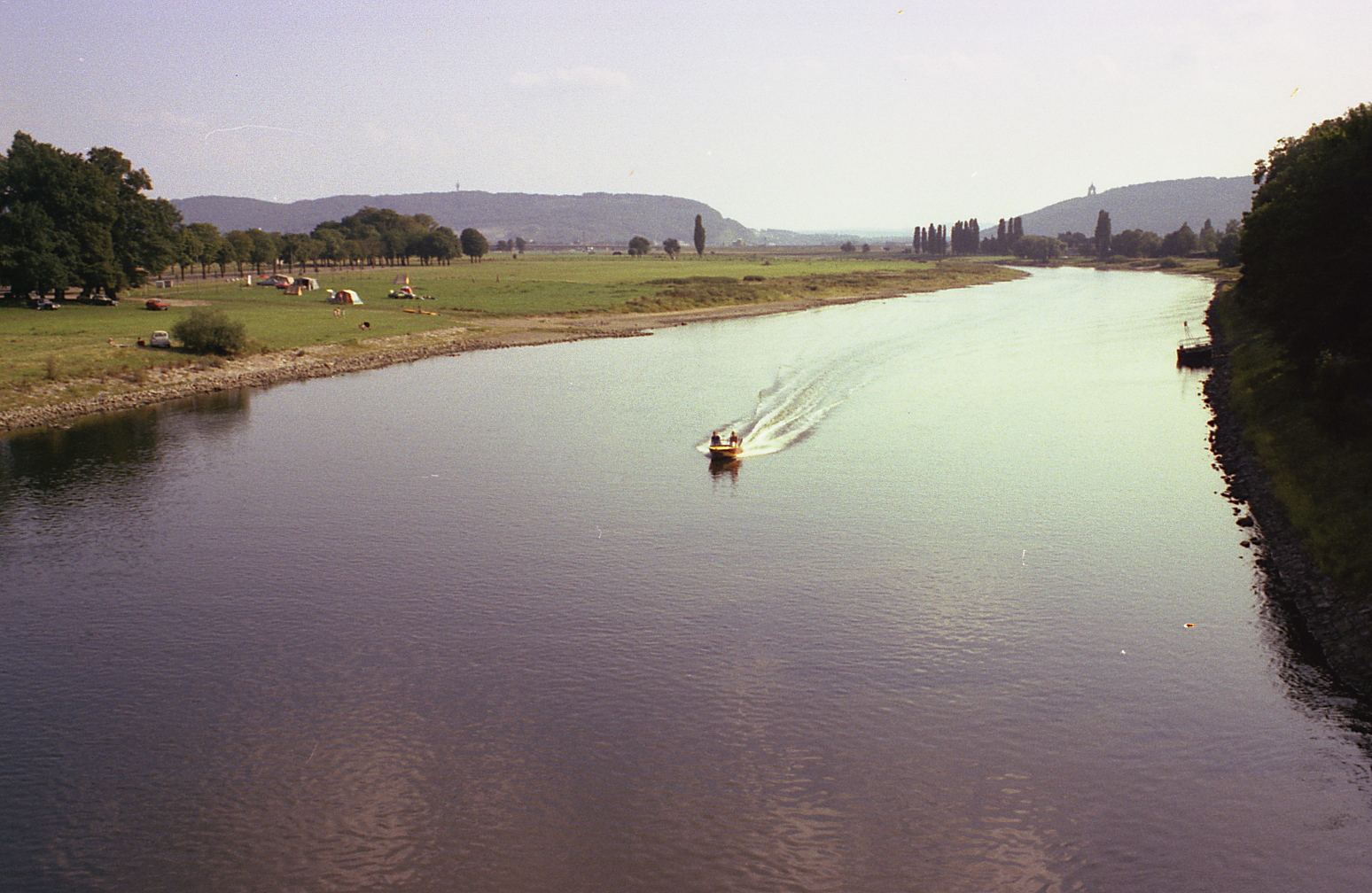
Harmonia lived and recorded near the River Weser, pictured here in 1977.

They recorded two albums under the name Harmonia: Musik von Harmonia in 1974 and Deluxe in 1975, both released on Brain Records. The former was produced by Harmonia themselves using a primitive mixer and three tape recorders. After its release and a period on tour, Rother took a short break from Harmonia to record the third Neu! album with Klaus Dinger, Neu! '75 (1975) in order to complete his contractual obligations. In his absence Cluster recorded Zuckerzeit (1974), with Rother credited as co-producer. The band's second album Deluxe saw producer Conny Plank co-produce with a 16-track recording machine and mixing desk, and featured live drumming by Guru Guru member Mani Neumeier. Deluxe emphasized Rother's rock and pop sensibility over Cluster's more improvisational approach, which led to some creative tension between the members.

=== Collaboration with Eno: 1976 ===
After the release of Deluxe, Harmonia went back to touring until Roedelius, Moebius and Rother ended their collaboration in summer 1976. All three members started solo projects but rejoined as Harmonia in September 1976 when Brian Eno visited them in Forst for 11 days, living and recording with Harmonia before proceeding to collaborate with David Bowie on his 1977 albums. Eno brought along a four-track recorder and a VCS3 synthesizer. The material for Tracks and Traces was not released until 1997 because the tapes were long considered lost.

Eno has stated that Harmonia was "the world's most important rock band" in the mid '70s, Eno had joined Harmonia once live in 1974, jamming with the group at The Fabrik in Hamburg. David Bowie considered Harmonia one of the most important and influential German bands of the era.

=== Reformation: 2007-2009 ===
Harmonia reunited in 2007 following the release of their album Live 1974, a recording of their concert of 23 March 1974 at Penny Station Club in Griessem, Germany. Rother, Roedelius and Moebius performed live as Harmonia for the first time since 1976, opening the Worldtronics Festival at the Haus der Kulturen der Welt in Berlin, Germany on 27 November 2007.

Musician, writer, and rock historian Julian Cope places both albums in his Krautrock Top 50. The trio also toured and a new recording drawn from this period, Live 1974 was released on the UK-based Grönland Records label on 22 October 2007 and the San Francisco based Water Records label in the United States on 11 December 2007.

Harmonia made their first live appearance in the UK on 18 April 2008, playing on the opening night of the Ether Festival in the Queen Elizabeth Hall at Southbank Centre, London. In July 2008, the band also headlined the final day of the Supersonic Festival in Birmingham.

Harmonia further appeared at the All Tomorrow's Parties music festival in the UK in May 2008, at the Numusic festival in Stavanger, Norway, at an edition of ATP curated by My Bloody Valentine in New York in September 2008 and at the Australian series of the festival, curated by Nick Cave and the Bad Seeds in January 2009.

In September 2009, an extended version of Tracks and Traces was released by Gronland. The new album features three additional tracks from the Harmonia & Eno ´76 collaboration. Tracks and Traces Remixed, an album composed of remixes followed in 2010.

Dieter Moebius died in July 2015.

In October 2015, Grönland Records released the 6-disc vinyl boxset Complete Works. The box included all three studio albums, Live 1974 and Documents 1975; a collection of 2 live tracks and 2 early versions of Deluxe LP album tracks. Documents 1975 was released as a separate CD and vinyl-LP in March 2016. Documents 1975 had been released as a cassette prior to the Complete Works boxset in September 2015.

== Style and influence ==
According to AllMusic, the work of Harmonia was borne out of "relaxed, improvisational jam sessions that wedded Cluster's exploratory space music with the chugging rhythms and guitar sense of Rother." Uncut named their two studio albums as "among the best Krautrock had to offer, gentler than Can or Faust, but with their shimmering keyboards and mechanical rhythms, every bit as compelling. Pitchfork labeled them "a key krautrock band because they brought together the most familiar strands of the sound and effectively perfected the whole," calling attention to their hybrid of electronic and rock instrumentation, long-form structures, and steady rhythms.

AllMusic writer John Bush described Harmonia as "one of the most legendary in the entire krautrock/kosmische scene." Collaborator Brian Eno described them in the mid-1970s as "the world's most important rock group." Harmonia's work would influence the development of ambient music by Eno and albums by David Bowie, as well as other electronic and rock acts.

According to Pitchfork, "copies of their records found their way into some famously open-eared and influential fans in the UK—Eno and Bowie, among others—and Harmonia’s music has been part of the experimental rock canon ever since." Harmonia continued to influence Brian Eno's work after their collaboration. Their work, according to critic Alex Abramovich, helped to lay the foundation "not only for ambient music but for generations of blues-less rock bands, from Wire and New Order to My Bloody Valentine."

== Members ==
- Michael Rother – guitar, keyboards, electronic percussion, vocals (1973–1976, 2007–2009)
- Hans-Joachim Roedelius – keyboards, occasional guitar, electronic percussion, vocals (1973–1976, 2007–2009)
- Dieter Moebius – synthesizers, mini harp, occasional guitar, electronic percussion, vocals (1973–1976, 2007–2009)
- Brian Eno – synthesizers, bass, vocals (1976)
- Mani Neumeier – drums (1975)

== Discography ==
Studio albums

- 1974 Musik von Harmonia
- 1975 Deluxe
- 1997 Tracks and Traces (as Harmonia '76, in 2009 as Harmonia & Eno '76, originally recorded in 1976)

Compilation and live albums

- 2007 Live 1974
- 2010 Tracks and Traces Remixed (as Harmonia & Eno '76)
- 2015 Documents 1975
- 2015/2020 Complete Works (box set)

Singles

- 1975 "De Luxe (Immer Wieder)"/"Monza (Rauf Und Runter)"

== See also ==
- Brian Eno
- Cluster
- Dieter Moebius
- German rock
- Hans-Joachim Roedelius
- Kluster
- Kraftwerk
- List of ambient music artists
- Michael Rother
- Neu!

== Other sources ==
- Cult Cargo Harmonia Article. Retrieved August 31, 2007.
- Roedelius, Hans-Joachim Official Home Page - Upcoming Events. Retrieved August 31, 2007.
- Rother, Michael Harmonia web page. Retrieved September 1, 2007.
- Rother, Michael Michael Rother Home Page. Retrieved September 1, 2007.
- Wick, Sherman Musik Von Harmonia review. Retrieved September 2, 2007.
- Bush, John Allmusic biography. Retrieved September 2, 2007.
- Dumych, Daniel Harmonia article. Retrieved September 2, 2007.
- Cope, Julian Krautrock Top 50. Retrieved September 4, 2005.
