= Michael Rother =

German experimental musician (born 1950)

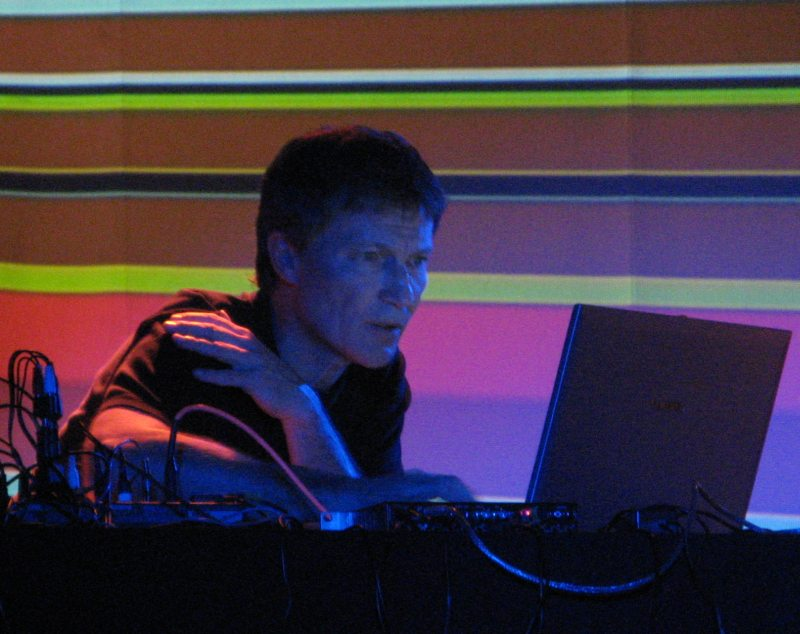
- Rother in concert in 2007

Background information
- Born: 2 September 1950 (age 76); Hamburg, West Germany (now Germany)
- Genres: Krautrock; electronic; experimental rock; new age
- Occupation: Musician
- Instruments: Guitar; keyboards; programming
- Years active: 1971–present
- Labels: Brain; Sky; Polydor; Random
- Website: www.michaelrother.de/en/

Michael Rother (German: [ˈmɪçaʔeːl ˈʁoːtɐ]; born 2 September 1950) is a German experimental musician, best known for being a founding member of the influential bands Neu! and Harmonia, and an early member of the band Kraftwerk.

== Early life and education ==
Born in 1950, Rother was educated in Munich, Wilmslow (England), Karachi, and Düsseldorf. In Pakistan, he was exposed to Pakistani music that would influence his own music in the late 1960s and early 1970s. From 1965, Rother played in the band Spirits of Sound, from which other members would later go on to join Kraftwerk (Wolfgang Flür) and Wunderbar.

== Music career ==
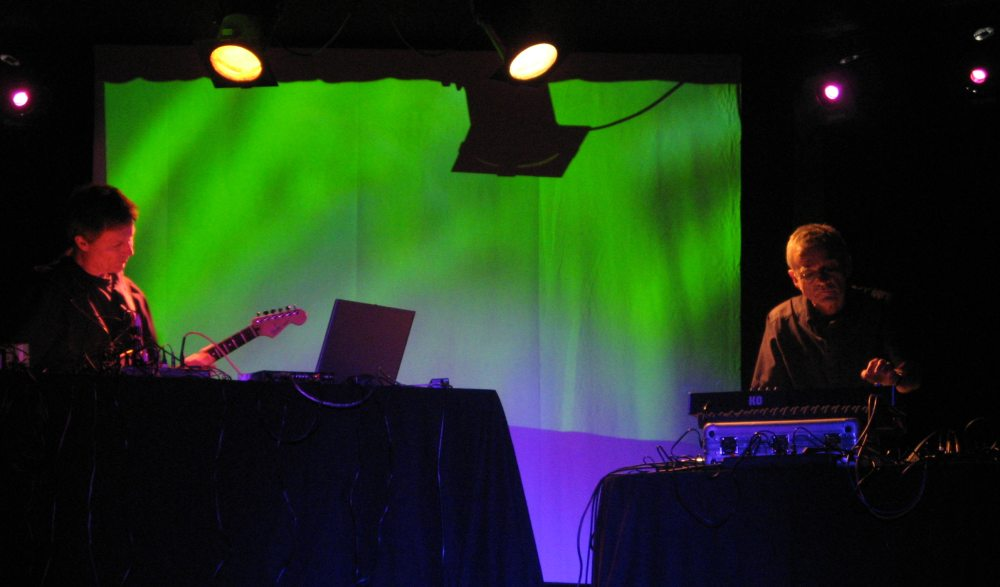
Michael Rother (left) & Dieter Moebius (right) live in 2007

Rother is a multi-instrumentalist (primarily guitar and keyboards) who, along with a catalog of several solo albums starting in 1977, is best known for having co-founded the German group Neu! with drummer Klaus Dinger (five albums between 1971 and 1996), and his collaborative efforts with Hans-Joachim Roedelius and Dieter Moebius (aka Cluster) under the name Harmonia (two albums, one in 1974 and 1975, with later 1976 sessions recorded with Brian Eno; the studio tapes for the latter disappeared but were found by Roedelius two decades later; he remixed the tapes and released the results as Tracks and Traces in 1997; Rother was the main producer for the version re-released in 2009). Rother and Dinger were also in a short-lived version of Kraftwerk in 1971, with Florian Schneider, during a time when founding member Ralf Hütter had temporarily left the band (this version of the group was filmed during an appearance on the German music show Beat Club, which has been available sporadically on VHS and DVD).

Beginning in the late 1970s, Rother began issuing LPs under his own name: Flammende Herzen (1977), Sterntaler (1978), and Katzenmusik (1979) all featured drums by Can drummer Jaki Liebezeit. AllMusic felt the "bright, warm groove" of 1978 composition "Sonnenrad" (from Sterntaler) anticipated "synth pop bands like OMD". Further releases included Fernwärme (1982), Lust (1983), Süssherz und Tiefenschärfe (1985) and Traumreisen (1987). Rother regained the rights to these releases in the late 90s, and re-released CD versions of them, all of which contained bonus tracks, usually in the form of then-current remixes of original album tracks. Along with these reissues were a best-of compilation, Radio, and a new release, Esperanza (1996). His album, Remember featured vocals (a first for Rother's solo work) and was released in 2004.

On 1 July 2007, Rother joined the Red Hot Chili Peppers for a live jam at the end of their concert in Hamburg. Together they played for nearly 25 minutes in front of 35,000 people. In November 2007 he toured with Dieter Moebius (another member of Harmonia) as Rother & Moebius. On 27 November 2007, a Harmonia reunion concert was announced for Berlin, where they performed together live for the first time since 1976.

In 2010, Rother played five shows in Europe with Sonic Youth drummer Steve Shelley and Tall Firs guitarist Aaron Mullan (who played bass in the trio). This group, known as Hallogallo, performed the music of Neu! live for the first time in many years. They also played the ATP New York 2010 music festival in Monticello, New York and Incubate 2010 in Tilburg, Netherlands in September 2010. In December 2012 Rother performed the music of Neu! and Harmonia at the ATP festival in Camber Sands, England, accompanied by the Berlin-based band Camera. In November 2013, he performed at the final UK holiday camp edition of ATP.

In 2015, Rother recorded scores for the German film Die Räuber (The Robbers) by Paul Cruchten and Frank Hoffmann and the German TV film Houston by Bastian Günther.

In September 2016, Rother played Neu! & Harmonia at an underground music festival in Berlin called Synasthesie II, alongside notable acts such as Cavern of Anti-Matter. A mini-doc of the festival was created.

In February 2019, Rother re-released his first four solo albums and his recent soundtrack work for The Robbers and Houston in the boxset Solo. LP editions included the extra disc Live & Remixes.

On 4 September 2020, Rother released his new album Dreaming. It was his first new music in sixteen years. An official video of the song "Bitter Tang" from the album was released on 21 August 2020. A second box set containing material released after 1980 and including the new album was also released on Groenland Records in September 2020.

"Edgy Smiles" is the title of Rother's new single which was released in November 2021. He recorded the track with Vittoria Maccabruni with whom he recorded a whole album which was released in January 2022 on Groenland Records titled As Long As The Light. A second single from the album, titled Exp 1, was released in December 2021. An accompanying video was released on 10 December 2021.

To celebrate the 50th anniversary of the 1972 Neu! debut album, Rother played two concerts, Michael Rother & Friends: Celebrate 50 years NEU!. The first was in Berlin, on 26 October 2022, and the second was in London on 3 November 2022.

== Discography ==
Michael Rother discography
- Studio albums: 11
- Compilation albums: 5
- Singles: 11

The discography of Michael Rother consists of eleven studio albums, three compilations, two boxsets and eleven singles.

As a member of Neu! Rother released three studio albums, two albums of studio outtakes (Neu! 4/Neu! '86) and a rehearsal recording. As a member of Harmonia, Rother released two studio albums, one live album, a studio out-takes album and a remix album. In 2010 Rother released the "Blinkgürtel" single with his live group Hallogallo 2010.

Studio albums

Year	Album details
1977	Flammende Herzen: Labels: Sky Records
1978	Sterntaler: Labels: Sky Records
1979	Katzenmusik: Labels: Sky Records
1982	Fernwärme: Labels: Polydor Records
1983	Lust: Labels: Polydor Records
1985	Süssherz & Tiefenschärfe: Labels: Polydor Records
1987	Traumreisen: Labels: Polydor Records
1996	Esperanza: Labels: Random Records
2004	Remember: Labels: Random Records, WEA, Gang Go Music
2020	Dreaming: Labels: Grönland Records

Compilation albums

Year	Album details
1985	Glanzlichter: Labels: Polydor
1993	Radio – Singles, 1977–1993: Labels: Random Records
1998	Chronicles I: Labels: Purple Pyramid
2019	Solo (boxset): Labels: Grönland Records
2020	Solo II (boxset): Labels: Grönland Records

Singles

- "Flammende Herzen" b/w "Karussell" (1977)
- "Sterntaler" b/w "Sonnenrad" (1978)
- "Katzenmusik 9" b/w "Katzenmusik 2" (1979)
- "Silberstreif" b/w "Erlkönig" (1982)
- "Hohe Luft" b/w "Fortuna" (1982)
- "Palmengarten" b/w "Cascadia" (1983)
- "Süssherz" b/w "Maus-Mann-Motiv Nr. 4" (1985)
- "Glitzerglanz" b/w "Rapido" (1985)
- "Lichtermeer" b/w "Happy-End" (1987)
- "Edgy Smiles" (2021) (with Vittoria Maccabruni)
- "Exp 1" (2021) (with Vittoria Maccabruni)

Contributions

- Station 17 (1990, Mercury/Phonogram) – "Morning Sun"
- A Homage To Neu! (1999, Cleopatra) – "Neutronics 98 (A Tribute To Conny Plank)"
- Brand Neu! (2009, Feraltone) – "Neutronics 98"
- Music For A Good Home (2009, Audioscope/Shelter) – "Maus-Mann-Motiv"

=== Collaborations ===
Year	Album details
1972	Neu! (with Neu!): Labels: Brain Records
1973	Neu! 2 (with Neu!): Labels: Brain Records
1974	Musik von Harmonia (with Harmonia): Labels: Brain Records
1975	Neu! '75 (with Neu!): Labels: Brain Records
1975	Deluxe (with Harmonia): Labels: Brain Records
1995	Neu! 4 (with Neu!): Labels: Captain Trip Records
1996	Neu! '72 Live in Dusseldorf (with Neu!): Labels: Captain Trip Records
1997	Tracks & Traces (with Harmonia '76/Harmonia & Eno '76): Labels: Rykodisc
2007	Live 1974 (with Harmonia): Labels: Grönland Records
2010	Tracks and Traces Remixed (with Harmonia & Eno '76): Labels: Grönland Records
2010	Neu! '86 (with Neu!): Labels: Grönland Records
2010	"Blinkgürtel" b/w "Drone Schlager" (with Hallogallo 2010): Released: December 2010; Labels: Vampire Blues
2021	As Long as the Light (as Michael Rother and Vittoria Maccabruni): Labels: Grönland Records

== Videography ==
- Romantic Warriors IV: Krautrock
