= Grönland Records =

Independent record label originally founded in London, United Kingdom

Grönland
- Founded: 1999
- Founder: Herbert Grönemeyer
- Country of origin: United Kingdom
- Location: Berlin, Germany (since 2009)
- Official website: groenland.com

Grönland Records is a British–German independent record label founded in London, England; the company relocated to Berlin in 2009. "Grönland" (German for Greenland) refers both to the country, the label's founder, Herbert Grönemeyer and the eponymous piece on his 1993 album Chaos.

== Origin ==
The label was founded by German actor and singer Herbert Grönemeyer in connection with an eight-CD box set called Pop 2000. The CD box set and its companion TV series were designed to document music culture in Germany over the course of the 20th century and featured artists such as Neu!, Faust, Kraftwerk, The Notwist, DAF, and Mouse on Mars.

Grönland only signs a maximum of six to eight bands and projects per year.

== Artists on Grönland's roster ==
The list below consists of artists listed on the "Artists" and "Alumni" sections of Grönland's web site.

=== Current roster ===
- Boy
- Broadcast 2000
- Deutsch Amerikanische Freundschaft
- William Fitzsimmons
- Fujiya & Miyagi
- Gang of Four
- Nina Hagen
- Emily Haines
- Harmonia
- Harmonia & Brian Eno '76: Tracks and Traces (remastered reissue with bonus material)
- Harrisons
- Merz
- Metric
- Neu! (a major reissue project, the first official CD issues)
- Conny Plank
- Roedelius
- Christoph H. Müller & Roedelius (Mueller_Roedelius)
- Roedelius / Story (Lunz)
- Sol Seppy
- Susanne Sundfør
- Emiliana Torrini
- Windmill

=== Former roster (selection) ===
- AK4711
- Bombay1
- Dextro
- Freeland (released on continental Europe in collaboration with Marine Parade)
- Half Cousin
- Kira
- Lockdown Project
- Machine
- Pet
- Petra Jean Phillipson
- Psapp (Grönland continues to market their album Tiger My Friend despite the band now being on Domino Records)
- Sondre Lerche
- The Earlies (released in continental Europe in collaboration with 679 Recordings)
