= Cover Me (Nena album) =

Studio album by Nena
- Released: 28 September 2007
- Studios: Tonamt, Hamburg
- Languages: German; English
- Label: Warner
- Producers: Derek von Krogh; Philipp Palm; Uwe Fahrenkrog-Petersen; Nena

Nena chronology
Willst du mit mir gehn (2005)	Cover Me (2007)	Made in Germany (2009)

Singles from Cover Me
- 1. "Mach die Augen auf" Released: 10 August 2007; 2. "Ich werde dich lieben" Released: 21 September 2007; 3. "Mein Weg ist mein Weg" Released: 7 December 2007

Cover Me is the ninth studio album by German pop singer Nena, released on November 28, 2007. In it she covers her favorite songs, with the first CD devoted to German-language originals and the second to English-language originals. Peaking at No. 6 in the German charts, it is her only studio album since her comeback to not make it to the German Top 5. "Mach die Augen auf", "Ich werde dich lieben", and "Mein Weg ist mein Weg" were released as singles.

== Track listing ==
Disc 1 — Standard edition
No.	Title	Writer(s)	Original artist(s)	Length
1.	"Mach die Augen auf"	Nena Kerner	Nena	3:25
2.	"Eiszeit"	Annette Humpe; Hans J. Behrendt; Frank Jürgen Krüger; Ulrich Deuker	Ideal	2:54
3.	"Der Sheriff"	Robert Görl; Gabi Delgado-López	DAF	5:12
4.	"Mein Weg ist mein Weg"	Klaus Hoffmann	Klaus Hoffmann	4:37
5.	"Helden"	David Bowie; Brian Eno	David Bowie	4:22
6.	"Ich werde Dich lieben"	Bruce Welch; Marlene Dietrich	Marlene Dietrich	2:47
7.	"Remmidemmi"	Malte Pittner; Sebastian Hackert; Bartosch Jeznach; Philipp Grütering	Deichkind	4:20
8.	"Für alle, die"	Suzie Kerstgens; Thomas Deininger; Sten Servaes	Klee	3:20
9.	"Winter Sommer"	Alexander Binder; Clueso; Norman Sinn	Clueso	3:45
10.	"Astronaut"	Kraans de Lutin; Mark Schlumberger	Mellow Mark	5:30
11.	"Ein Lied"	Christoph Schneider; Christian Lorenz; Till Lindemann; Paul Landers; Oliver Riedel; Richard Kruspe	Rammstein	4:41
12.	"Schön von hinten"	Françoise Cactus; Friedrich von Finsterwalde	Stereo Total	2:49
13.	"Wir bauen eine neue Stadt"	Holger Hiller; Thomas Fehlmann	Palais Schaumburg	2:19
14.	"In den tiefen dunklen Gängen der Vergangenheit"	Udo Lindenberg	Udo Lindenberg	5:13
15.	"Die Kinder deiner Kinder"	Udo Lindenberg	Udo Lindenberg	3:50
16.	"Für dich tu ich fast alles"	Ulla Meinecke	Ulla Meinecke	3:24
17.	"Das Jahr 2000"	Hildegard Knef; Herbert Rehbein	Hildegard Knef	4:01

Disc 1: — Deluxe edition (bonus tracks)
No.	Title	Writer(s)	Original artist(s)	Length
18.	"Mein Schwert"	Andreas Rieke; Michael B. Schmidt; Thomas Dürr; Michael Beck; Ralf Goldkind	Die Fantastischen Vier	3:14
19.	"Der Weg zu zweit"	Stephan Eicher; Martin Eicher	Grauzone	3:14

Disc 2 — Standard edition
No.	Title	Writer(s)	Original artist(s)	Length
1.	"The Last Time"	Mick Jagger; Keith Richards	The Rolling Stones	3:47
2.	"It's All Over Now, Baby Blue"	Bob Dylan	Bob Dylan	3:14
3.	"She's a Rainbow"	Mick Jagger; Keith Richards	The Rolling Stones	3:13
4.	"Fade into You"	David Roback; Hope Sandoval	Mazzy Star	5:04
5.	"Friday I'm in Love"	Robert Smith; Simon Gallup; Perry Bamonte; Boris Williams; Porl Thompson	The Cure	3:40
6.	"Starman"	David Bowie	David Bowie	3:47
7.	"Blowin' in the Wind"	Bob Dylan	Bob Dylan	4:02
8.	"Slipping Away"	Moby	Moby	3:58
9.	"Sexy Boy"	Jean-Benoît Dunckel; Nicolas Godin	Air	4:32
10.	"Big Yellow Taxi"	Joni Mitchell	Joni Mitchell	2:34
11.	"Children of the Revolution"	Marc Bolan	T. Rex	3:30
12.	"After the Gold Rush"	Neil Young	Neil Young	6:31
13.	"Us and Them"	Roger Waters; Richard Wright	Pink Floyd	7:03
14.	"Darkness"	Peter Gabriel	Peter Gabriel	6:26

== Charts ==
Chart (2007)	Peak position
Austrian Albums (Ö3 Austria)	18
German Albums (Offizielle Top 100)	6
Swiss Albums (Schweizer Hitparade)	22
