= Burkina Electric =

Electronic music group from Burkina Faso

- Origin: Ouagadougou, Burkina Faso
- Genres: Electronic music
- Years active: 2007-present
- Labels: Cantaloupe Music
- Members: Lukas Ligeti, Maï Lingani, Wende Blass, Kurt Dahlke, Wendy, Zoko Zoko

Burkina Electric is an electronic music group from Ouagadougou, the capital city of Burkina Faso. They are one of Africa's first electronic acts. Despite the group's African origins, they are mostly based in New York City. They were formed in 2007 when Maï Lingani (vocals), Wende K. Blass (guitar), Kurt Dahlke (electronics), and Lukas Ligeti (drummer) created the band for a tour of Austria. Lingani and Blass are from Burkina Faso, Dahlke (also known as Pyrolator) is from Düsseldorf, Germany, and Ligeti is from Austria. They released an EP called "Reem Tekre" in 2007 on the Atatak label. The group contributed live music to the ballet "Itutu", which debuted in 2009 and was performed by Karole Armitage's company Armitage Gone! Dance. Their first full-length album, Paspanga, was released in early 2010. It was described as "fierce" by Richard Gehr in Spin, and as "a sleek, kinetic album" by Nate Chinen.

== Discography ==
- Reem Tekre EP (2007, Atatak)
- Paspanga (2010, Cantaloupe)
