= Ein Produkt der Deutsch-Amerikanischen Freundschaft =

- Original 1979 LP sleeve

Studio album by DAF
- Released: 1979
- Recorded: February–April 1979
- Genre: Noise rock, post-punk, krautrock, industrial, Neue Deutsche Welle, experimental rock
- Length: 29:52
- Label: Warning/Ata Tak

DAF chronology
Ein Produkt der Deutsch-Amerikanischen Freundschaft (1979)	Die Kleinen und die Bösen (1980)

Professional ratings
Review scores
Source	Rating
AllMusic	2.5/5 stars

Ein Produkt der Deutsch-Amerikanischen Freundschaft (A Product of German-American Friendship) is the first album by the German electronic music group Deutsch-Amerikanische Freundschaft. It was the second release, and first album, on Kurt Dahlke's Ata Tak label (then called Warning) in 1979.

The album consists of 22 untitled instrumental experimental pieces, in styles from post-punk to industrial music.

The album was reissued on Mute Records in 1999 and on Bureau B/Ata Tak in 2012.

== Personnel ==
Singer Gabi Delgado had temporarily left the band after early recordings had not worked out, so the other members recorded the album as instrumentals between February and April 1979. Members on the recording were Kurt Dahlke (keyboards), Robert Görl (drums), Michael Kemner (bass) and Wolfgang Spelman (guitar).

Shortly after the album's release, Dahlke left D.A.F. to pursue personal projects. He was replaced by Chrislo Haas.

== Reception ==
The Allmusic Guide to Electronica dismisses the album as "near-apocalyptic shrieks". Trouser Press describes it as "an apocalyptic eruption of sound announcing the end of the German Republic", assessing it as "simultaneously repellent and compelling."

== Track listing ==
=== Side A ===
1. Untitled – 0:44
2. Untitled – 1:03
3. Untitled – 0:19
4. Untitled – 2:33
5. Untitled – 1:07
6. Untitled – 0:45
7. Untitled – 0:43
8. Untitled – 1:48
9. Untitled – 0:55
10. Untitled – 3:15
11. Untitled – 0:59
12. Untitled – 1:19

=== Side B ===
1. Untitled – 0:36
2. Untitled – 1:41
3. Untitled – 0:25
4. Untitled – 1:47
5. Untitled – 1:24
6. Untitled – 2:08
7. Untitled – 1:32
8. Untitled – 1:13
9. Untitled – 0:31
10. Untitled – 3:07
