= Monarchie und Alltag =

Studio album by Fehlfarben
- Released: October 1980
- Recorded: June 1980
- Studios: EMI Studios, Cologne
- Genres: Neue Deutsche Welle; post-punk; new wave; dance-punk
- Length: 39:12
- Labels: Welt-Rekord; EMI Electrola
- Producers: Fehlfarben, Horst Luedtke

Fehlfarben chronology
Monarchie und Alltag (1980)	33 Tage in Ketten (1981)

Monarchie und Alltag (Monarchy and Daily Life) was the 1980 debut album of German rock band Fehlfarben, released on the Welt-rekord-label, a subsidiary of EMI. The album was not well-received initially, but developed a following over time, entering the charts seven months after its release and gradually climbing to peak at #37. The album belatedly spawned a hit single in 1982, "Ein Jahr (Es geht voran)", and certified gold in 2000, after a re-release during the post-punk revival.

The poor initial reception of the album and a scheduled lengthy tour prompted the departure of vocalist and songwriter Peter Hein, who did not return to the band until following a 2000 reunion. Guitarist Thomas Schwebel took over as lead vocalist for the tour and subsequent releases.

The album is regarded as highly influential in the Neue Deutsche Welle movement of Germany and the German punk scene. It secured a position for the band and its first lead singer as prominent figures in the German punk movement.

== Response ==
The album was not critically well received on its release, but in spite of line-up changes the band managed to increase public interest over time through live performance and the release of new material. Months after its October 1980 release, in May 1981, the album entered the German album charts where it gradually climbed to #37, only earning gold status in 2000 after a reissue coincident with the post-punk revival. Over time, however, the album has developed a tremendous reputation. Die Zeit described the album as a "revolutionary monument". Telepolis described it as "an unsurpassed masterpiece". It has been variously termed "a cornerstone of modern German rock", "the most important German punk album", and "the best German-language album overall". Bayerischer Rundfunk states that the group and the album were the "epicenter of the German punkscene in the early 1980s" and that with the release of Monarchie und Alltag the band became "the first volume in the German new wave".

At the time of release, the album did not secure any hit singles, but two years after the album was released label EMI issued "Ein Jahr (Es geht voran)" to capitalize on the rising popularity of the German new wave (Neue Deutsche Welle) movement. The song reached the top 20 in the charts.

According to Der Tagesspiegel, the album has lost nothing of its appeal over the years, to those who were punk at the time or even those who were not yet born, as it retains its forcefulness, directness and relevance.

== Background ==
The band was formed from two former members of foundational German punk band Charley's Girls—Peter Hein and Markus Oehlen—who had gone on to play in the influential punk group Mittagspause. The pair decided to form a post-punk band with other prominent members of the Düsseldorf punk community: Thomas Schwebel, Michael Kemner, Frank Fenstermacher and Uwe Bauer. Influenced by the two-tone ska and punk rock music of London, they brought their interpretation of the style to live performances in Germany and to a 7" single released on their own independent label, Welt-Rekord-Label. In summer of 1980, the band's label was purchased by EMI, who gave them studio space to record Monarchie und Alltag, which was released in October of that year.

Although many of the band's members had a hand in composing material, much of the album was penned by vocalist Peter Hein during free time at his job at Xerox. Der Spiegel credits the best compositions of the album to Hein and guitarist Thomas Schwebel, who wrote the iconic song of the German "No-Future" generation, "Paul ist tot" ("Paul is dead"), one refrain of which translates, "What I want, I cannot get. And what I can get, I don't like." The album, at the cutting edge of musical styles, pushed Fehlfarben to the forefront of the German punk movement and made Peter Hein its point figure, even though he had quit the band three days before the lengthy Monarchie und Alltag tour to dedicate himself to his job at Xerox.

In an interview years later with die tageszeitung, Hein indicated that he found the then-security of his job preferable to the stressful life of a musician on the road and that returning to work felt almost like a vacation. It was a decision that puzzled the press at the time. Questioned about his work ethic in that interview, Hein stated that he was puzzled by the "arrogance" of those who looked down on the working class.

The band continued performing with Schwebel on vocals and releasing albums after Hein's departure, but reunited with its first vocalist in 2000 after the belated receipt of a gold record for the album

== Track listing ==
Music by Frank Fenstermacher, George Nicolaidis, Michael Kemner, Peter Hein, Thomas Schwebel and Uwe Bauer.
Except where otherwise noted, lyrics by Fenstermacher, Nicolaidis, Kemner, Hein, Schwebel and Bauer.

Side A
1. Hier und Jetzt – 2:44
2. Grauschleier – 2:25
3. Das sind Geschichten – 3:21
4. All That Heaven Allows – 3:37
5. Gottseidank nicht in England – 2:40
6. Militürk (lyrics by Gabi Delgado-López) – 5:22
Side B
7. Apokalypse – 3:11
8. Ein Jahr (Es geht voran) – 2:51
9. Angst – 2:16
10. Das war vor Jahren – 2:35
11. Paul ist tot – 7:56

== Personnel ==
Fehlfarben

- Peter Hein – vocals
- Frank Fenstermacher – saxophone
- Thomas Schwebel – guitar
- Michael Kemner – bass guitar
- Uwe Bauer – drums
- George Nicolaidis – synthesizer

Guest musician

- Kurt Dahlke (aka Der Pyrolator) – synthesizer (track 11)

Production

- Fehlfarben – producer
- Rolf Hanekamp – recording and mixing
- Harald Lepschies – recording and mixing
- Horst Luedtke – producer
- Martin Bücker – album cover
- Uwe Bauer – album cover
