= Alles ist gut =

Studio album by Deutsch Amerikanische Freundschaft
- Released: 1981
- Recorded: December 1980 – January 1981
- Studio: Conny Plank's Studio, Neunkirchen, Germany
- Genre: Neue Deutsche Welle; electropunk; EBM
- Length: 34:44
- Label: Virgin
- Producer: Konrad "Conny" Plank

Deutsch Amerikanische Freundschaft chronology
Die Kleinen und die Bösen (1980)	Alles ist gut (1981)	Gold und Liebe (1981)

Alles ist gut (Everything Is Fine) is the third album by German electropunk band Deutsch Amerikanische Freundschaft. It was released in 1981 and was the band's first album on the Virgin Records label. It includes the hit single "Der Mussolini". The album was a massive hit in Germany, where it charted for 46 weeks.

The album was reissued by Mute Records in 1998.

== Recording ==
The album was the first recorded with the band reduced to the duo of Gabi Delgado and Robert Görl.

== Commercial performance ==
Alles ist gut was on the German charts for 46 weeks, peaking at No. 15, and the Austrian charts for eight weeks, peaking at No. 16. It received the Schallplattenpreis award from the Deutsche Phono-Akademie, an association of the German recording industry.

== Critical reception ==
Professional ratings
Review scores
Source	Rating
AllMusic	4/5 stars

Reviewing the album for NME, Paul Morley characterised Alles ist gut as "slimy, steamy sex music", an evocation of "the rubbing, juices, pounding, striving, belching, stickiness ... the smells, the rhythms, the passions, the secretions, the darkness, the tears of S.E.X." It was ranked the eighth best album of 1981 by NME. Simon Reynolds, in Rip It Up and Start Again: Postpunk 1978–1984 (2006), notes the influence the album had on Morley's later marketing and image for Frankie Goes to Hollywood, a band signed to Morley's label ZTT Records.

In the All Music Guide to Electronica, Ned Raggett describes how Alles ist gut worked musically: "...keeping the electronic brutality that characterized them, but stripped down to nothing but Görl's massive drumming, electronic bass and synth tones, and Delgado's deep, commanding singing." Trouser Press observed that "typical funk rhythms are replaced by industrial pulses (trains, etc.)" and noted the more pop-oriented vocal styles on the album.

== Track listing ==
=== Side 1 ===
1. "Sato-Sato" ("Sato-Sato") – 2:43
2. "Der Mussolini" ("The Mussolini") – 3:50
3. "Rote Lippen" ("Red lips") – 2:41
4. "Mein Herz macht Bum" ("My heart goes boom") – 4:26
5. "Der Räuber und der Prinz" ("The robber and the prince") – 3:27

=== Side 2 ===
1. "Ich und die Wirklichkeit" ("Me and the reality") – 3:05
2. "Als wär's das letzte Mal" ("As if it were the last time") – 3:24
3. "Verlier' nicht den Kopf" ("Don't lose your head") – 3:17
4. "Alle gegen Alle" ("Everyone against everyone") – 3:55
5. "Alles ist gut" ("Everything is fine") – 3:25

== Charts ==
=== Weekly charts ===
Chart (1981–82)	Peak position
Austrian Albums (Ö3 Austria)	16
German Albums (Offizielle Top 100)	15

=== Year-end charts ===
Chart (1981)	Position
German Albums (Offizielle Top 100)	50
