= Nur Noch Einer =

Studio album by Robert Görl and Deutsch Amerikanische Freundschaft
- Released: 26 November 2021
- Genres: Neue Deutsche Welle; electropunk; EBM
- Label: Grönland
- Producer: Sylvie Marks

Robert Görl and Deutsch Amerikanische Freundschaft chronology
Fünfzehn neue D.A.F.-Lieder (2003)	Nur Noch Einer (2021)

Professional ratings
Review scores
Source	Rating
Laut.de	2/5 stars
Musikexpress	2.5/6 stars
Plattentests.de	6/10 stars

Nur Noch Einer ("Down to One" or "Just One More") is the final studio album by Deutsch Amerikanische Freundschaft, released on 26 November 2021 on Grönland Records. Gabi Delgado-López and Robert Görl had planned to do a DAF album in 2020. After Delgado died in March 2020, Görl assembled old material from the band's 1980s work and wrote new lyrics. Görl sang and recorded the album with production assistance from Sylvie Marks. Critical response was mixed, with multiple reviewers commenting on Delgado's absence.

Görl played the album on tour in 2022.

== Critical response ==
Gerd Roth for Deutsche Presse-Agentur considered the album "danceable" and noted how it covered four decades of DAF, back to their first days in Düsseldorf. Plattentests.de called the album "old school EBM" and listed "Kunststoff" and "Wir Sind Wild" as "irresistible, pure power tracks." Sounds & Books said the album had "a classic DAF sound. Brutal, repetitive synth riffs and straightforward drums and chants" and considered that the album worked despite Delgado's absence.

Chicago Reader compared Görl's vocals to Alan Vega of Suicide and said that "Wir Sind Wild" and "Gedanken Lesen" had "the propulsive, proto-industrial throb of the group’s classic material." Laut.de was not positive about Görl's lyrics and called the record a "strange solo album." Musikexpress said that without Delgado, the album lacked DAF's humour and that Görl was not able to capture the "true spirit" of DAF without him. Kulturnews considered the album an "exciting extension" of songs like "Der Mussolini" or "Kebab-Träume," though Delgado's absence was "painfully noticeable."

Jungle World considered that the album lacked "liveliness, the raw, immediate and provocative" and that the production was sterile.

== Track listing ==
The album was released as a 15-track CD and a 10-track LP.

CD:

1. Erste DAF Probe
2. Im Schatten
3. Kunststoff
4. Wir Sind Wild
5. Das Pur Pur Rot
6. Gedanken Lesen
7. Du Bist So Zart
8. Ein Kind Aus Dem Ratinger Hof
9. Loslassen
10. Neue Welt
11. Kein Ausweg
12. Ess Muss Ans Licht
13. Holland Road
14. Das Geschenk
15. Nur Noch Einer

LP:

Side A:

1. Im Schatten
2. Kunststoff
3. Wir Sind Wild
4. Das Pur Pur Rot
5. Loslassen

Side B:

1. Neue Welt
2. Kein Ausweg
3. Es Muss Ans Licht
4. Das Geschenk
5. Nur Noch Einer
