= Robert Görl =

German musician (born 1955)

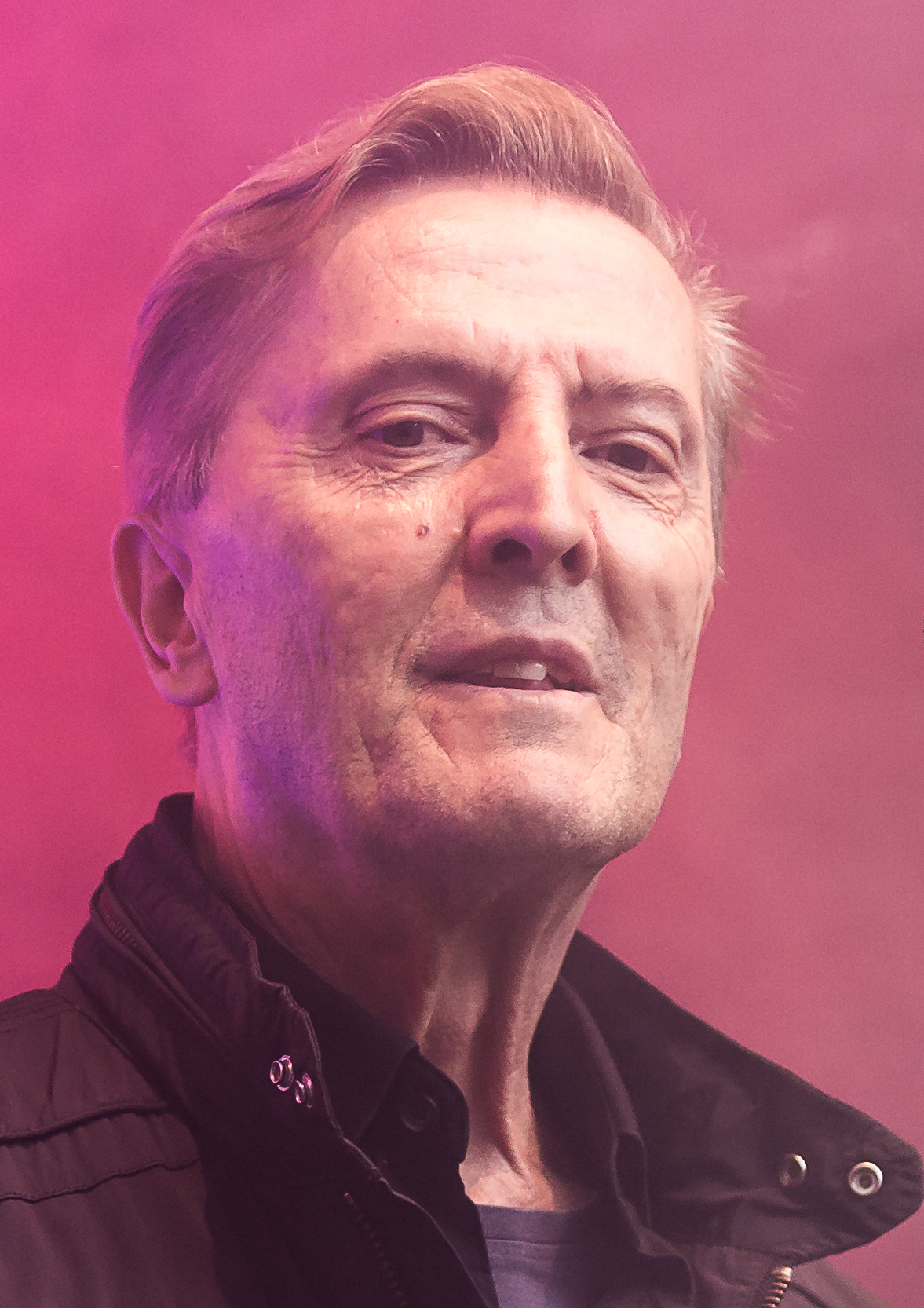
- Görl, in 2023

Background information
- Born: 15 June 1955 (age 71); Munich, West Germany (now Germany)
- Genres: Industrial, electronic
- Occupation: Composer
- Instruments: Voice, drums, synthesizers
- Years active: 1978–present
- Labels: Mute, Virgin
- Website: robert-goerl.de

Robert Görl (born 15 June 1955 in Munich) is a German musician, best known for his work with Deutsch Amerikanische Freundschaft (D.A.F.) and for his solo recordings, particularly Night Full Of Tension and "Darling Don't Leave Me" (together with Annie Lennox) .

== Biography ==
Görl started his life in an orphanage. At the age of 18, Görl took drum lessons with the jazz musician Freddie Brocksieper. In 1974, he started a classical music education at the Leopold Mozart Conservatory in Augsburg and in 1976 at the University of Graz while also devoting himself to jazz. In 1978, he interrupted his studies, went to London and became interested in punk rock. In the same year, he met Gabriel "Gabi" Delgado-López in Düsseldorf and formed Deutsch Amerikanische Freundschaft (D.A.F.). Robert Görl served as a composer and musician for the group. In total, DAF released seven studio albums between 1979 and 2003.

Robert Görl played drums for the 1981 Eurythmics album In the Garden. Görl also played in other bands such as Der Plan.

With their third album, Alles ist Gut (1981, Virgin Records), DAF achieved international success and two European tours followed. In 1982, DAF received the "Deutscher SchallplattenPreis" (German Music Award) for their album Alles ist Gut. The first DAF break was in 1983 at their musical peak.

In 1984, Robert Görl recorded his first solo album Night Full of Tension (Mute Rec). The album featured Eurythmics singer Annie Lennox who sang a duet with Görl on the song Darling Don't Leave Me.

DAF reformed in 1985 to record their first English-language album, 1st Step to Heaven (1986 Dean-Ariola-Illuminated Rec).

In 1989, Görl was involved in a serious car accident. Afterward, he became a Buddhist and traveled through Asia for three years of study. After his return, he released several solo albums and singles throughout the 1990s on Disko B, a Munich-based techno label run by Peter Wacha.

From 2000 to 2002, Görl met with Delgado-López to stage a D.A.F. comeback. Their album Fünfzehn neue D.A.F.-Lieder was released in early 2003. In 2003 DAF gave their first live show at Tokyo's Yokohama Stadium. The group disbanded again in November 2005.

In 2008, DAF made another comeback. A reunion tour, "30 Years of DAF (The Thirty Years' War)," followed. In September 2010, the duo released the single "Du bist DAF" as a limited-edition release.

Delgado-López died in 2020 at the age of 61 as plans for a new DAF album were underway. In 2021, Görl released the album under the title Nur Noch Einer with help from producer Sylvie Marks. The album utilized unreleased DAF audio sequences from the 1980s.

In October 2023, Görl published his autobiographical novel Das Versteck der Stimme (The Voice That Dwells Within), which was co-authored with Hanna Rollmann.

== Discography ==
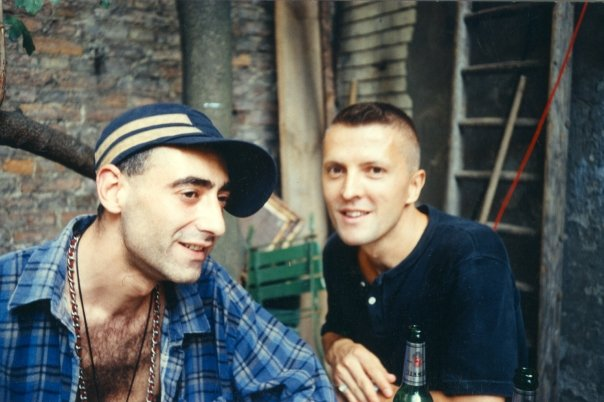
Gabi Delgado-López (left) and Robert Görl (right)

=== Solo albums ===
Night Full of Tension

- Released: 1984
- Format: LP
- Label: Mute
- Tracks: Playtime (3:54) / I Love Me (5:31) / Charlie Cat (3:40) / Gewinnen Wir Die Beste Der Frauen (4:49) // Queen King (4:54) / Love In Mind (4:45) / Darling Don't Leave Me (3:39) / Wind In Hair (4:19)

(Psycho) Therapie

- Released: 1994
- Format: CD
- Label: Disko B
- Tracks: Derja Come (6:55) / Eric's Playing (8:30) / Psychoring (6:46) / Do We Do We (8:39) / M M (12:03) / Psychofrau (5:55)

Watch the Great Copycat

- Released: 1996
- Format: CD
- Label: Disko B
- Tracks: Insekter (6:20) / Ali Baba (4:19) / Wabe (8:37) / Rund (6:20) / Dämonika (5:27) / Rubber Ritual (4:53) / Yip Yep (5:57) / Have A Bath (5:07) / Bumba (A Buddha) (6:05) / Loop It Baby (1:02) / Echt Lollyzopf (4:42) / End Of A Trip (0:25)

Watch the Great Copycat

- Released: 1996
- Format: 2×LP
- Label: Disko B
- Tracks: Insekter (6:20) / Have A Bath (5:07) // Wabe (8:37) / Ali Baba (4:19) /// Bumba (A Buddha) (6:05) / Dämonika (5:27) // Loop It Baby II (1:02) / Echt Lollyzopf (4:42) / Rubber Ritual (4:53)

Sexdrops

- Released: 1998
- Format: CD/2×LP
- Label: Disko B
- Tracks: Dominatrix Supreme (5:20) / Pet Teaser (5:03) // Scoops (4:43) / Deep Intruder (5:13) /// Do It - Let's Boogee (5:19) / Triple Dripping (3:58) // Blue Sex Drops (4:58) / Spanish Bull (5:31) / Call A Loony (1:31)

Final Metal Pralinées

- Released: 2000
- Format: CD/2×LP
- Label: Disko B
- Tracks: One More Hour (6:53) / Artificial Water (4:52) / Rave Plastik (5:04) // Dizzy Loophead (3:59) / Las Vegas Cowboy (6:03) / Bass Spieler (4:29) /// KDB (3:16) / War Dämon (4:29) / Drum Putzen (5:13) // Basket (5:03) / Exotika (4:07) / Last Korg Exit (4:49) / Loop It Baby III (4:49) (Note: "Loop It Baby III" is a locked groove on the 2×LP only.)

Dark Tool Symphony

- Released: 2008
- Format: CD
- Label: Prussia Records
- Tracks: Aufmarsch (3:36) / Liebesschwur (5:44) / Erster Dunkler Kontakt (12:08) / Red Groove (4:37) / Vereinigung (4:51) / Zweite Sonne (2:03) / Dark Tool Symphony [ AVI file ] (19:00)

Night Full of Tension

- Released: 2014
- Format: Digital
- Label: Mute
- Tracks: Playtime (3:54) / I Love Me (5:31) / Charlie Cat (3:40) / Gewinnen Wir Die Beste Der Frauen (4:49) / Queen King (4:54) / Love In Mind (4:45) / Darling Don't Leave Me (3:39) / Wind In Hair (4:19) / Mit Dir (Extended) (5:54) / Berührt Verführt (Remix) (3:46) / Darling Don't Leave Me (Extended) (6:59) / A Ist Wieder Da (3:36) / Eckhardt's Party (4:22)

=== With Client ===
Live In Porto

- Released: 2006
- Format: CD
- Label: self-released
- Tracks: It's Rock And Roll (4:35) / In It For The Money (4:11) / Tuesday Night (3:25) / Down To The Underground (3:02) / Price Of Love (3:59) / Pills (5:02) / Client (3:32) / Overdrive (3:53) / Radio (3:53) / Here And Now (4:24) / Pornography (3:53) / Rock And Roll Machine (5:28) / Diary Of An 18 Year Old Boy (4:32) / Zerox Machine (4:56) / Der Mussolini (4:54)

=== With DAF ===
- Ein Produkt der Deutsch-Amerikanischen Freundschaft (Warning, 1979)
- Die Kleinen und die Bösen (Mute, 1980)
- Alles ist gut (Virgin, 1981)
- Gold und Liebe (Virgin, 1981)
- Für Immer (Virgin, 1982)
- 1st Step to Heaven (Dean/Ariola, 1986)
- Fünfzehn neue D.A.F.-Lieder (Superstar, 2003)
- Nur Noch Einer (Grönland, 2021)

=== Singles ===
Mit Dir.

- Released: 1983
- Format: 7"/12" Vinyl
- Label: Mute
- Tracks: Mit Dir. / Berührt Verführt.

Darling Don't Leave Me

- Released: 1984
- Format: 7" Vinyl
- Label: Mute
- Tracks: Darling Don't Leave Me (feat. vocals by Annie Lennox) / A Ist Wieder Da

Darling Don't Leave Me (Extended Mix)

- Released: January 30, 1984
- Format: 12" Vinyl
- Label: Mute
- Tracks: Darling Don't Leave Me (feat. vocals by Annie Lennox) / A Ist Wieder Da / Eckhardt's Party

Electric Marilyn

- Released: 1991
- Format: 12" Vinyl / CD
- Label: Hangman Records
- Tracks: Electric Marilyn (Radio Edit) (4:28) / Electric Marilyn (The "B" Mix) (5:05) // Repeat The Beat (Euromix) (5:12) / Repeat The Beat (Schnapping Mix) (7:15)

Psycho

- Released: 1993
- Format: 12" Vinyl / CD
- Label: Disko B
- Tracks: Psychosafe / Psychoblock // Psychoring / Psychofrau

Psycho (Remixes)

- Released: 1993
- Format: 12" Vinyl
- Label: Disko B
- Tracks: Psychotrip (6:00) / Psychodrive (6:00) // Psychopat (6:30) / Psychodrome (6:30)

Therapie

- Released: 1994
- Format: 2 × 12" Vinyl
- Label: Disko B
- Tracks: Derja Come / Do We Do We // Eric's Playing / M M

Happy Gathering / U.F.N. (First 1000 copies issued on red vinyl.)

- Released: 1995
- Format: 12" Vinyl
- Label: Disko B
- Tracks: Happy Gathering (8:17) / U.F.N. (6:55)

Yip Yep

- Released: 1996
- Format: 12" Vinyl
- Label: Disko B
- Tracks: Loop It Baby (0:39) / Yip Yep (5:57) // Rund (6:20)

The Right Side of Reason (with Karl O'Connor) (450 copies)

- Released: 1998
- Format: 12" Vinyl
- Label: D/N Records
- Tracks: Untitled (1:09) / Untitled (5:10) // Untitled (4:28)

Seltsame Liebe

- Released: 2006
- Format: 12" Vinyl
- Label: Gold & Liebe Tonträger
- Tracks: Seltsame Liebe (Original) / Seltsame Liebe (The Hacker Remix) // Seltsame Liebe (Miss Yetti Remix)
