= Der Plan =

German electronic music group

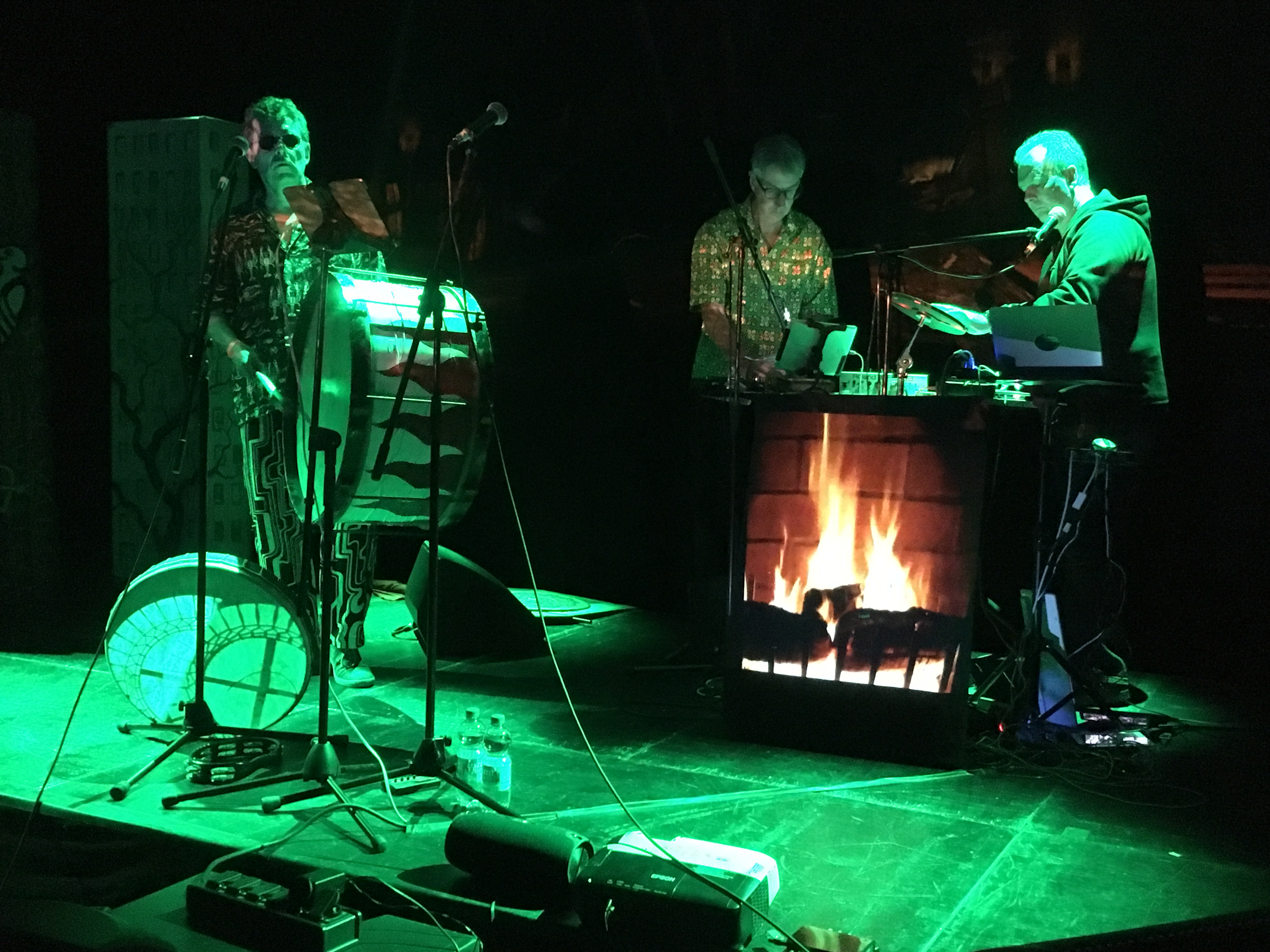
- Der Plan in 2019

Background information
- Origin: Düsseldorf, Germany
- Genre: Neue Deutsche Welle
- Years active: 1979–1992; 2003–2007 (as Der Plan v4.0)
- Label: Ata Tak
- Members: Moritz Reichelt; Frank Fenstermacher; Kurt Dahlke
- Past members: Chrislo Haas; Achim Treu; JJ Jones; Kai Horn
- Website: Official Website

Der Plan is a German electronic music group from Düsseldorf, formed in the earlier months of 1979 by Moritz Reichelt (A.K.A. Moritz R®), Kai Horn, and Frank Fenstermacher, originally under the name of Weltaufstandsplan ("World Rebellion Plan"). This group is considered the pioneer of Neue Deutsche Welle.

== History ==
=== The beginning ===
Kai Horn, one of the founder members, left the group suddenly before their first recording. The first single was recorded with the support of Chrislo Haas and Robert Görl (both DAF members at the time). The recording of a jam session was carried out in an underground shelter using a cassette dictation machine. In 1979 the band released 1500 units of their debut single themselves. This was the start of Der Plan's own label "Warning Records", later known as "Ata Tak". Their early recordings are reminiscent of industrial sounds of the same period (e.g. early works of US band Chrome) and had a significant influence on fellow Düsseldorf act Die Krupps as well as, eventually, on electronic pop worldwide.

=== 1980s ===
Kurt Dahlke aka Pyrolator (ex DAF) joined Der Plan a short time later. The group became more musical, clearly reducing the noisy elements of their songs. Their 1980 debut album Geri Reig still showed their experimental side. On this album, they strongly displayed their musical influences, which included The Residents and Throbbing Gristle. Some titles were kept deliberately "inaudible" by the members in order to explore the boundary of music.

At the end of the year, they released the single Da Vorne Steht 'Ne Ampel which had a plausible melody. Der Plan thereby began to seek out a musical framework which would lead to their later style of "Electronic Schlager" (electronic hit song), or "Synthi Pop", as they called it themselves. The single became one of the first hit tunes of Neue Deutsche Welle, and the group received offers from major record companies. Der Plan decided to remain independent within their own label, although they accepted a partial contract with Teldec to re-release the single. The LP Normalette Surprise was released in 1981 where the group developed "electronic schlagers" further and finally fixed their own style.

In 1982, Rainer Kirberg, the film director, made a film Die letzte Rache (The Last Revenge), for which Der Plan composed the soundtrack. The group not only provided the film music: Moritz R was partly responsible for the film's surrealistic scenic design, which resembled The Cabinet of Dr. Caligari-like German expressionism, whilst Frank Fenstermacher played a small role as an actor. The film was broadcast by ZDF as a part of "Das Kleine Fernsehspiel" series and received critical acclaim. The soundtrack emphasized the group's experimental side in a mixture of experimental sounds and plausible melodies as in preceding works.

In 1984, Der Plan released two singles. Gummitwist did not achieve the expected high chart position, although it was released by a major label (WEA) and enabled the group to appear on ARD's music program Formel Eins. Soon after that, the double single Golden Cheapos was released. It featured three instrumental tunes. The group subsequently released the video Japlan, after which they did a successful Japan tour. The LP entitled Japlan was quite successful in the Japanese market, but was never released in Germany. This LP work was re-released in CD in 2002.

In 1985, the compilation album LP Fette Jahre (Fat years) was released in Germany. It contained well-known single tracks, outtakes, and remixes of previous works. The record sleeve shows an ironic picture of the band members disguised in homeless type clothing.

A new album was released in 1987, entitled Es Ist Eine Fremde Und Seltsame Welt (It is a strange world). The title was taken from a famous quote of Blue Velvet by the cult director David Lynch. The sleeve is very eye-catching, as the wording and the main monochrome image are almost entirely in black. One song from this album 1 Mann, 1 Ball was later covered by Der wahre Heino.

As CDs swept across the market, Der Plan decided to release their best album in CD. It was released in 1988 under the title of Perlen.

=== Breakup ===
Working for the label and record distribution activities overshadowed the focusing on the band's music. Differences within the group about career priorities began in 1983, resulting in Moritz R leaving the label Ata Tak and moving to Hamburg. Since then Der Plan had changed from a full-time project to an occasional side-project of its members.

Nevertheless, they released yet another album, entitled Die Peitsche Des Lebens in 1989, which was much less successful than their previous works.

In 1992 Der Plan eventually split up.

In 1993 the fake live album "Live At The Tiki Ballroom ...", which is confirmed as a studio album on their official website, was released. Its first edition was accompanied by a mini CD, which contained "techno versions" of well known Der Plan titles.

Moritz R® dedicated himself to painting after the group's break up. He chronicled his experiences as part of Der Plan in the book Der Plan - Glanz und Elend der Neuen Deutschen Welle (Der Plan - the Splendor and Misery of the New German Wave).

Pyrolator and Frank Fenstermacher formed a trance project A Certain Frank later. They joined another German group, Fehlfarben in 2002.

Meanwhile Kurt Dahlke and Moritz Reichelt live in Berlin. Reichelt opened his own gallery called chakchakart shop in Potsdam and Berlin in 2020 and released his first solo album Nach Herzenslust in 2021.

In 2021 the band releases the Album Save your Software. In 2025, Der Plan released the album Take It Easy – Der Plan Plays Der Plan on their own label Ata Tak. The LP/CD features ten newly recorded versions of the band’s classic songs, reinterpreted in a smoother, more melodic style that blends elements of electronic pop, jazz, psychedelia, and easy listening. The album was created by the founding members Moritz R®, Frank Fenstermacher, and Kurt Dahlke (also known as Pyrolator).

=== Der Plan v4.0 ===
Der Plan was formed again as Der Plan v4.0 in Berlin by Moritz R®, Achim Treu and JJ Jones in 2003. The album Die Verschwörung (The Conspiracy) was released in 2004.

=== Der Plan v5.0 ===
In 2008 Der Plan was formed as Der Plan v5.0 within the online virtual world Second Life. The entirely virtual band played two gigs using scans of stage designs and masks from their real life in the early 1980s and was represented by the avatars Mo Eriksen, Moni Duettmann and Popeye235 Baxter.

== Musical style ==
Der Plan's musical style is a thing of much, and often heated debate. It has been referred to (in almost equal measures) as "a work of Genius", and "the demented results of a kindergarten music project gone terribly wrong".

== Discography ==
=== Singles ===
- 1979: Der Plan (7" aka Untitled aka Das Fleisch)
- 1980: Da Vorne Steht Ne Ampel (7")
- 1981: Einfachheit, Brot, Klarheit, Liebe, Tod (7" with Fix Planet v/a compilation LP)
- 1983: Gummitwist (7" and 12" on WEA)
- 1984: Golden Cheapos Vol. 1&2 (2x7")
- 1993: Pocket (3" MCD with remixes, released with some copies of the so-called Live At The Tiki Ballroom CD)
- 2005: Deutschland Bleiche Mutter - Malente Remix (12")
- 2016: Gefährliche Clowns (7")
- 2017: Greetings From Düsseldorf (split 7" with Orbital)
- 2018: Wie Der Wind Weht (split 12" with Schlammpeitziger)

=== Albums ===
- 1980: Geri Reig
- 1981: Normalette Surprise
- 1983: Die Letzte Rache (soundtrack to a film by Rainer Kirberg first broadcast on ZDF in 1982)
- 1984: Japlan (initially a Japan only release)
- 1986: Fette Jahre
- 1987: Es Ist Eine Fremde Und Seltsame Welt
- 1991: Die Peitsche Des Lebens
- 1993: Live At The Tiki Ballroom Of The Senior Maoris Recreation Center In Maketu, Bay Of Plenty, New Zealand (CD only, and not actually a live album)
- 2004: Die Verschwörung (as Der Plan V.4.0)
- 2017: Unkapitulierbar
- 2021: Save your Software!!! (as Les Fanuks, a previously unreleased project from 1989)
- 2025 Take It Easy! Der Plan Spielt Der Plan

=== Compilations ===
- 1988: Perlen (CD only)
