= Die Kleinen und die Bösen =

Studio album by Deutsch Amerikanische Freundschaft
- Released: 13 June 1980
- Recorded: March 1980
- Studio: Conny Plank's Studio, Neunkirchen, Germany (tracks 1–8); Electric Ballroom, London (tracks 9–19)
- Genre: Electropunk, experimental electronic
- Length: 38:29
- Label: Mute STUMM 1
- Producer: Conny Plank

Deutsch Amerikanische Freundschaft chronology
Ein Produkt der Deutsch-Amerikanischen Freundschaft (1979)	Die Kleinen und die Bösen (1980)	Alles ist gut (1981)

Professional ratings
Review scores
Source	Rating
AllMusic	4/5 stars

Die Kleinen und die Bösen (The Small and the Evil) is the second album by Deutsch Amerikanische Freundschaft, released on 13 June 1980. It was the first album ever released on Mute Records.

Side A and the first track of side B are studio recordings produced by Conny Plank. The remainder of side B is a live recording from the Electric Ballroom, Camden Town, London.

== Personnel ==
For this album, the band was Gabi Delgado-López, Robert Görl, Chrislo Haas, Michael Kemner and Wolfgang Spelmans. Haas, Kemner and Spelmans left before D.A.F.'s breakthrough follow-up album, Alles ist gut.

== Reception ==
Despite the album's low sales, The Allmusic Guide to Electronica notes its influence: "it helped not merely in establishing the group's cachet, but the label's and, in turn, the whole genre of experimental electronic music in the '80s and beyond." Trouser Press notes the band's movement from industrial noise toward modern dance: "Material is more polished, with anarchic synthesizer work slowly integrating a solid, defined beat." Simon Reynolds, in Rip It Up and Start Again: Postpunk 1978–1984, describes it as "brilliant and sinister".

== Track listing ==
Side A:

1. "Osten währt am längsten" 5:44
2. "Essen, dann schlafen" 1:05
3. "Co Co Pino" 3:25
4. "Kinderfunk" 3:02
5. "Nachtarbeit" 1:53
6. "Ich gebe dir ein Stück von mir" 1:41
7. "De Panne" 2:34

Side B:

1. "Gewalt" 1:24
2. "Gib's mir" 1:01
3. "Auf Wiedersehen" 1:59
4. "Das ist Liebe" 1:22
5. "Was ist eine Welle" 1:15
6. "Anzufassen und anzufassen" 1:44
7. "Volkstanz" 0:47
8. "Die lustigen Stiefel" 1:50
9. "Die Kleinen und die Bösen" 1:05
10. "Die fesche Lola" 1:41
11. "El Basilon" 2:51
12. "Y La Gracia" 2:05
