= Liaisons Dangereuses (band) =

German band

- Origin: Düsseldorf, West Germany
- Genres: Neue Deutsche Welle; new wave; electropunk; EBM
- Years active: 1981–1982
- Labels: Teldec; Roadrunner; Mute
- Spinoff of: CHBB; D.A.F
- Past members: Beate Bartel; Chrislo Haas; Krishna Goineau
- Website: www.liaisonsdangereuses.de

Liaisons Dangereuses was founded by Beate Bartel and Chrislo Haas together with vocalist Krishna Goineau in Düsseldorf, West Germany in 1981. Before the Liaisons Dangereuses trio, Chrislo Haas and Beate Bartel were in duo named CHBB. They released an eponymous album earlier the same year as the creation of Liaisons Dangereuses in 1981. A sort of premise before Krishna Goineau joined. As a part of the Neue Deutsche Welle scene (especially electropunk) in Germany they pioneered EBM.

After recording four ten-minute cassettes, they released their sole album in 1981. The self-titled album was mixed at Conny Plank's studio in Cologne. The group made several live appearances throughout 1981 and 1982 and were occasionally joined by Anita Lane and Hideto Sasaki. The album carried the single "Los Niños del Parque" that displayed a "step-sequenced" style that became an underground hit and has been cited by many prominent Chicago house and Detroit techno DJs as a crucial influence.

Liaisons Dangereuses inspired the naming of an underground dance and "electro" music program on Antwerp SIS radio (103.9 FM) presented by Sven Van Hees that became notable during the rise of AB music and New Beat during the late 1980s.
