= Geri Reig =

Studio album by Der Plan
- Released: 1980
- Recorded: November 1979–January 1980
- Studio: Art Attack Studios
- Genre: Experimental pop; electronic
- Label: Warning; Ata Tak
- Producer: Der Plan

Der Plan chronology
Geri Reig (1980)	Normalette Surprise (1981)

Geri Reig is the debut studio album by German band Der Plan, released in 1980 by record labels Warning and Ata Tak.

== Critical reception ==
Professional ratings
Review scores
Source	Rating
AllMusic	4/5 stars

AllMusic wrote: "Pop music has never sounded stranger than on Der Plan's debut full-length, Geri Reig, a unique blend of Residents-inspired experimental pop and innovative electronics. A cohesive and endlessly listenable record, it creates a sense of detachment and mystery found in all the best records of the new wave era".

== Track listing ==
1. "Adrenalin Lässt Das Blut Kochen" 3:10
2. "Geri Regi" 2:35
3. "Persisches Cowboy-Golf" 1:18
4. "Gefährliche Clowns" 3:18
5. "Kleine Grabesstille" 1:04
6. "Der Weltaufstandsplan" 2:43
7. "Hans Und Gabi" 3:10
8. "Commerce Extérieur Mondial Sentimental" 2:39
9. "Was Ich Von Mir Denke" 3:38
10. "San José Car Muzak" 2:56
11. "Erste Begegnung Mit Dem Tod" 0:51
12. "Ich Bin Schizophren" 2:39
13. "Nessie" 1:29
14. Gefährliche Clowns (Manisch Idiotisch)" 4:57
15. "Die Welt Ist Schlecht" 1:52
