= Für immer (D.A.F. album) =

1982 album by Deutsch Amerikanische Freundschaft

- Original 1982 LP sleeve

Studio album by Deutsch Amerikanische Freundschaft
- Released: 1982
- Recorded: May 1982
- Studio: Conny Plank's Studio, Neunkirchen, Germany
- Genre: Electropunk
- Label: Virgin
- Producer: Konrad "Conny" Plank

Deutsch Amerikanische Freundschaft chronology
| Gold und Liebe (1981) | Für immer (1982) | 1st Step to Heaven (1986) |

Professional ratings
Review scores
| Source | Rating |
|---|---|
| AllMusic | 2/5 stars |

Für immer (Forever) is the fifth album by Deutsch Amerikanische Freundschaft, released in 1982. It was their last album for Virgin Records.

The band decided to split during the recording of Für immer, disillusioned with the reception of Gold und Liebe. Gabi Delgado and Robert Görl followed with the solo albums Mistress (Delgado) and Night Full of Tension (Görl).

The album was reissued on Mute Records in 1998.

== Reception ==
The AllMusic Guide to Electronica calls it "defiantly non-melodic though not exactly harsh" and finds it a "disappointing album." Trouser Press noted that the album is more varied than the two before it, with styles "from funk to rock'n'roll to distorted metal drone before returning to a dance blowout for the final track."

== Track listing ==
Side A:

1. "Im Dschungel der Liebe" 4:11
2. "Ein bisschen Krieg" 4:02
3. "Die Götter sind weiss" 3:00
4. "Verlieb dich in mich" 3:44
5. "Geheimnis" 3:23

Side B:

1. "Kebabträume" 4:01
2. "Prinzessin" 4:19
3. "Die Lippe" 3:09
4. "Verehrt Euren Haarschnitt" 3:24
5. "Wer schön sein will muss leiden" 3:35
