= DAF/DOS =

German electronic music project of the 1990s

- Origin: Germany
- Genres: Electropunk, synthpop
- Years active: 1995–1999
- Spinoff of: Deutsch Amerikanische Freundschaft
- Past members: Gabi Delgado-López; Wotan Wilke Möhring (first album only)

DAF/DOS was an electronic music project formed by Gabriel "Gabi" Delgado-López in 1995 as a continuation of his work with Deutsch Amerikanische Freundschaft (D.A.F.) (the 'DOS' in the band name refers to the Spanish word for 'two').

== History ==
Gabi recorded the album 'Allein, zu zweit, mit Telefon' with Wotan Wilke Möhring (who started an acting career a few years later), and then went solo for the 1999 album 'Der DAF/DOS Staat' (a live recording of this project was also released around the same time). The original D.A.F. lineup would reform a few years later, and the 'DOS' incarnation of 'D.A.F.' has not been heard from since.

== Discography ==
=== Albums ===
- Allein, zu zweit, mit Telefon (1996)
- Der DAF/DOS Staat (1999)
- Der DAF/DOS Live Staat (1999)

=== Singles ===
- Ich glaub' ich fick' dich später (1996)
- Stimme des Herzens (1996)
- Nordisc EP (1997)
- International Song (1999)
