= Chrislo Haas =

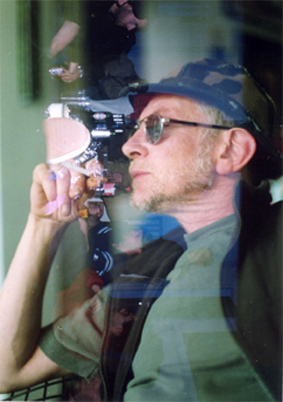
- Chrislo Haas, Berlin, 2002

Background information
- Birth name: Christian Ludwig Haas
- Also known as: Chrislo
- Born: 16 November 1956
- Died: 23 October 2004 (aged 47)
- Instrument: Synthesizer (Korg MS-20)
- Years active: 1978–2004
- Formerly of: Liaisons Dangereuses; D.A.F; Der Plan; Minus Delta t Crime & the City Solution

Christian Ludwig "Chrislo" Haas (16 November 1956 – 23 October 2004) was a West German Neue Deutsche Welle musician best known as a member of Liaisons Dangereuses and a founding member of Minus Delta t, D.A.F and Der Plan, and also as a member of Crime & the City Solution.

Haas was born in Aichach and moved to West Berlin. He heavily influenced the German music scene of the 1980s through his work on the synthesizer (Korg MS-20) with bands such as Minus Delta t, D.A.F., CHBB/Liaisons Dangereuses and Crime & the City Solution. He is regarded as one of the founding fathers of techno and modern electronic dance music. His former D.A.F bandmate Gabi Delgado said in 2015 that "Chrislo Haas influenced me more than Robert, in his extreme, über-punk way. Chrislo was a natural-born provocateur, which I liked."

Haas' work was extensively documented in Verschwende Deine Jugend (Waste Your Youth), Jürgen Teipel's book on the Neue Deutsche Welle.

Haas died in late October 2004 at the age of 47 in Berlin from circulatory collapse due to excessive alcohol consumption.

== Solo discography ==
As Chrislo:

- Low (2×LP/CD, Tresor TRESOR-92, 1998)
  - "La Chouette" (7:31) / "Hangars D'Orion" (11:00) / "Système Nerveux" (5:00) / "Fils D'O." (5:45) / "Le Bleu" (2:20) / "Double Brin" (5:40) / "2CV d'O." (4:50) / "Gromelo" (5:25) / "L'Eau" (6:30)
- "Hangars D'Orion" (11:00) // "La Chouette" (Surgeon Remix) (4:31) / "2 CV D'Orion" (Regis Berlin Mix) (4:52) (12", Tresor TRESOR-91, 1998)
