= Fünfzehn neue D.A.F.-Lieder =

Studio album by Deutsch Amerikanische Freundschaft
- Released: 24 February 2003
- Recorded: September–October 2002
- Genre: EBM
- Length: 70:18
- Labels: Superstar; Urban; Universal
- Producer: Robert Görl

Deutsch Amerikanische Freundschaft chronology
1st Step to Heaven (1986)	Fünfzehn neue D.A.F.-Lieder (2003)	Nur Noch Einer (2021)

Fünfzehn neue D.A.F.-Lieder (Fifteen New D.A.F. Songs) is a 2003 album by Deutsch Amerikanische Freundschaft, their first since 1986.

Critics considered it to echo the sound and feel of their older work. The band obtained old analogue synthesizers for the recording, although they used drum machines rather than Görl drumming.

The album achieved No. 95 in the German album charts for one week.

The single from the album, "Der Sheriff", was covered by Nena on her 2007 covers collection Cover Me.

== Reception ==
Premonition notes its similarity to their older work: "Same tribal rhythmic, same hypnotic sound loops, same aggressive and monotonous singing" Release concurs on the similarity to their previous works, calling it "simple, yet very effective."

== Track listing ==
1. "Der Sheriff" (Anti-Amerikanisches Lied) 3:46
2. "Ich Bin Tot" (Romantisches Lied) 5:04
3. "Du Bewegst Dich" (Tanzlied) 4:22
4. "Kinderzimmer" (Heldenlied) 3:38
5. "Rock Hoch" (Sexlied) 4:27
6. "Mira Como Se Menea" (Spanisches Lied) 3:59
7. "Satellit" (Weltraumlied) 4:49
8. "Moschino, Heckler & Koch" (Ganovenlied) 2:58
9. "Seltsame Freunde" (Kriegslied)
10. "Algorithmus" (Zahlenlied) 4:03
11. "Der Präsident" (Erste Welt Lied) 4:07
12. "Liebeszimmer" (Hexenlied) 6:00
13. "Komm' in Meine Welt" (Liebeslied) 5:10
14. "Die Lüge" (Wahrheitslied) 4:06
15. "Ich Bin Morgen Wieder Da" (Abschiedslied) 9:03
