= Kurt Dahlke =

German musician and record producer

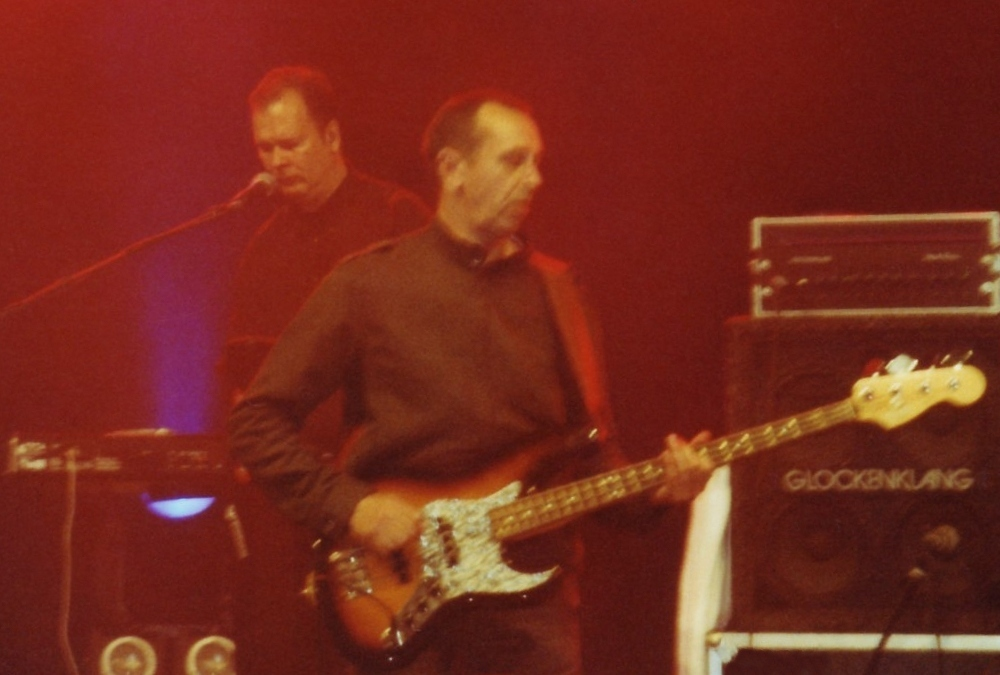
- Dahlke (left, keyboards) and Michael Kemner (bass) playing with Fehlfarben in Hagen in 2006

Background information
- Also known as: Pyrolator
- Born: 29 April 1958 (age 68)
- Origin: Wuppertal, NRW, Germany
- Genres: Experimental, techno, post-punk, electronic, new wave
- Occupations: Musician, producer, engineer
- Instruments: Synthesizers, keyboards
- Years active: 1979–present
- Labels: Warning Records, Ata Tak, Bureau-B, Captain Trip Records, Suezan Studio
- Website: pyrolator.com

Kurt Dahlke (born 29 April 1958), also known as Pyrolator, is a German musician and record producer. He is a founding member of record label/publishing company Ata Tak and has worked and still works in several bands. Several times he has been commissioned by the Goethe-Institut for workshops or concerts.

On stage, Dahlke operates his computer/synthesizer hardware by the movement or the pressure of the hands, with "Thunder" and "Lightning", two controllers built by Don Buchla.

== Career ==
In 1978, Dahlke was a founding member of D.A.F, but left the band in 1979, when he became a member of Der Plan (until 1992), and Fehlfarben (until 1980 and again since 2002). From the same year on he labeled his solo work as Pyrolator.

Dahlke collaborated on several films of director Rainer Kirberg, with Der Plan in The Last Revenge (1983) and Grottenolm (1985) and in 2011 as sound designer in Das schlafende Mädchen.

In 1996 he worked with his Der Plan partner Frank Fenstermacher as A Certain Frank, in 2005 he started a collaboration with painter Jörn Stoya as Bombay 1.

He's been involved as musician, engineer or producer in more than 400 releases.

=== Pyrolator ===
In 1979 he released Inland, his first album as Pyrolator. The cover stated: "Pyrolator Synthesizer Inland", the music is quite experimental—close to industrial music—incorporating field recordings and harsh electronica. On the follow-up Ausland (1981) he worked with a list of Ata Tak associated guests including his Der Plan colleagues and Holger Hiller. The songs range from experimental electronica to synth-pop, where Wunderland (1984) became his most playful, melodic and popular effort with references to world music.

In 1985 Dahlke collaborated with Arnd Kai Klosowski for the album Hometaping Is Killing Music an early effort in popular music based entirely on sampling.

1987's Pyrolator's Traumland with Susan Brackeen on vocals and a whole range of guest musicians became his most commercial and less experimental album. He then teamed up with Linda Sharrock and Frank Samba for Every 2nd, an album commissioned for the German Olympic pavilion at the 1988 Seoul Games.

With the singles "Ficcion Disco" and "City Space" in 1992-93, he moved towards Techno, which led to his productions for Antonelli Electr., the techno project of Stefan Schwander–another Ata Tak artist (with the I-Burnettes in 1990, and the Bad Examples from 1996 on).

Neuland from 2011 is the first Pyrolator album not released on Ata Tak but Bureau-B. It received a four star rating on Allmusic.

=== Ata Tak ===
Dahlke is a founding member of the independent record label and publishing company Ata Tak, as well as associated label Das Büro, from 1979 on, and with over 150 releases still in operation.

The two labels have been a fulcrum of the German Post-punk/ Neue Deutsche Welle scene, with releases of artists like Der Plan, Lost Gringos, DAF, Die Zimmermänner, Holger Hiller, Andreas Dorau, S.Y.P.H., Die Tödliche Doris, or Minus Delta T.

Later on Ata Tak e.g. released The Bad Examples, Element of Crime or 1993 the first album of Oval.

== Selected album discography ==
=== Pyrolator ===
- Inland (1979)
- Ausland (1981)
- Wunderland (1984)
- Hometaping is Killing Music (as Pyrolator/A.K.Klosowski) (1985)
- Traumland (1987)
- Every Second (as Pyrolator/Sharrock/Samba) (1988)
- Neuland (2011)
- Con-Struct (2015) (with Conrad Schnitzler)

=== A Certain Frank ===
- no end of no (1996)
- Nobody ? No! (1998)
- remixed by... (1999)
- Nothing (2001)
- Wildlife Live (2006)

=== Fehlfarben ===
- Monarchie und Alltag (1980)
- Knietief im Dispo (2002)
- 26 1/2 (2006)
- Handbuch für die Welt (2007)
- Hier und jetzt (live, 2009)
- Glücksmaschinen (2010)

=== Bombay 1 ===
- The Identity Thing (2001)
- Me Like You (2002)
- Strobl (2005)

=== Der Plan ===
- Geri Reig (1980)
- Normalette Surprise (1981)
- Die letzte Rache (1983)
- Japlan (1985)
- Fette Jahre (1986)
- Es ist eine fremde und seltsame Welt (1987)
- Perlen (1988)
- Die Peitsche des Lebens (1989)
- Live at the Tiki Ballroom (1993)

=== Other ===
- Ein Produkt der Deutsch-Amerikanischen Freundschaft (1979)
- Trashmuseum—I'd Rather Die Young Before I Grow Old Without You (1985) (with Jörn Stoya and Thomas Schwebel)
- Air-Weaving (1995)
- Telarana—Frühlingserwachen (1996)
- Beta Foly (1997) with Lukas Ligeti
- Pascal Plantinga Live (2006)
- Burkina Electric (2006) (with Lukas Ligeti)
