= Lukas Ligeti =

Austrian composer and percussionist

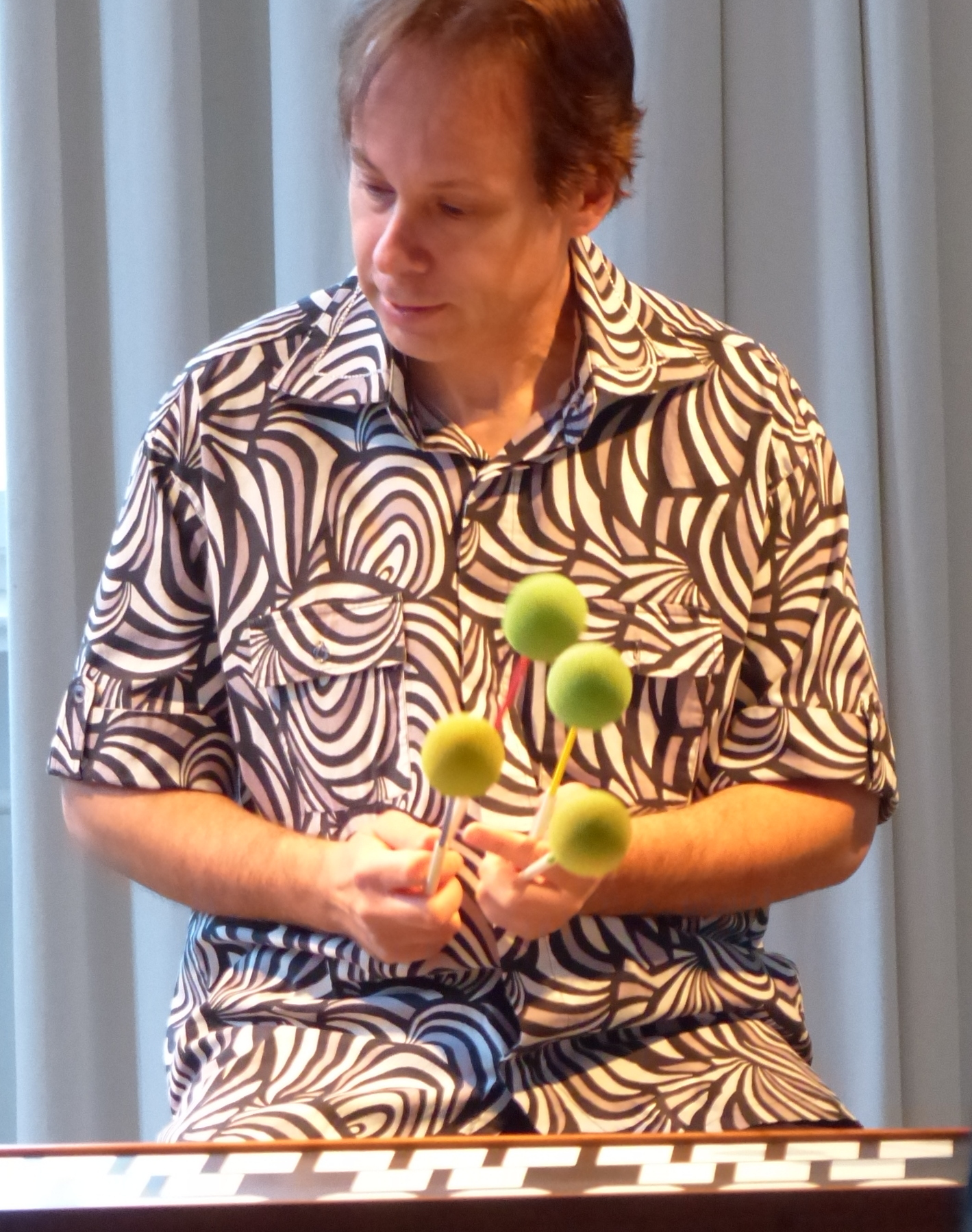
Ligeti in 2014

Lukas Ligeti (born in Vienna, Austria, 13 June 1965) is an Austrian composer and percussionist. His work incorporates elements of jazz, contemporary classical and various world musics, especially African traditional and popular music styles.

== Biography ==
Ligeti is of Hungarian ancestry (although he never learned to speak the Hungarian language fluently, since his parents spoke Hungarian to one another but spoke German to him while he was growing up) and is the son of the noted composer György Ligeti (1923–2006). He was born without citizenship, due to being the child of Jewish parents who had fled from Hungary.

He attended the University of Music and Performing Arts, Vienna, where he studied composition with Erich Urbanner, Kurt Schwertsik, Heinrich Gattermeyer, and Dieter Kaufmann; as well as jazz drums with Fritz Ozmec, earning a Diploma (with "unanimous distinction") in 1993 and an M.A. (with highest grade) in 1997. He earned a Ph.D. from the University of the Witwatersrand in Johannesburg, South Africa in 2020.

Ligeti has done numerous cross-cultural collaborations and exchanges with non-Western musicians, experimenting with both ancient African traditional instruments and modern music technology.

He travels frequently to Africa and has performed with musicians from Côte d'Ivoire (where he founded the experimental intercultural group Beta Foly), Egypt (with musicians from Nubia and the Orchestra of the Cairo Opera House), Zimbabwe (with Batonka musicians), Uganda (with Ndere Troupe), Kenya, South Africa, Lesotho (with lesiba performers), Mozambique and several other African nations.

His group, Burkina Electric, based in Burkina Faso, brings together electronica and Burkinabe popular music.

From 1994 to 1996 he was visiting composer at the Center for Computer Research in Music and Acoustics at Stanford University.

In 2006 he was visiting professor at the University of the Witwatersrand, Johannesburg. In 2008 he was a guest professor at the University of Ghana, where he collaborated with composer and musicologist J.H. Kwabena Nketia.

From 2015 to 2021 he was a member of the faculty of the Department of Music at the University of California, Irvine, where he taught in the Ph.D. program in Integrated Composition, Improvisation, and Technology (ICIT). He later taught at the University of Pretoria in South Africa, and joined the faculty of the Royal Conservatory of Brussels as Professor of Composition in 2024.

== Works ==
Ligeti creates music ranging from the through-composed to the free-improvised, often exploring polyrhythmic/polytempo structures, non-tempered tunings, and non-Western elements.

Compositions have been commissioned and/or performed at concerts and festival worldwide by the London Sinfonietta, the Amadinda Ensemble Budapest, Icebreaker, the London Composers' Ensemble, the Synergy Percussion Sydney, the Ensemble Modern, Kronos Quartet, Vienna Radio Symphony Orchestra, Bang on a Can, San Francisco Contemporary Music Players, Orchestre National de Lyon, Eighth Blackbird, American Composers Orchestra, MDR Orchestra Germany, Budapest Festival Orchestra, Håkan Hardenberger, Colin Currie, New York University, Subtropics Festival/Historical Museum of Southern Florida, Vienna Festwochen, Radio France, Tonkünstler Orchestra, Royal Liverpool Philharmonic´s Ensemble 10/10, Present Music, Ensemble Mise-En, Contemporaneous, Ensemble “die reihe”, Third Coast, Kroumata Percussion Groups, and a consortium that includes marimbists such as Eric Beach (So Percussion) and Ji Hye Jung, among others.

He has also composed for dance, film and gallery settings. He has collaborated with choreographers such as Karole Armitage and Panaibra Gabriel Canda, among others.

He has composed music for the European channel Arte TV, and created a sound installation for Goethe Institut on the occasion of the FIFA World Cup 2014 in Brazil.

He has collaborated with Lebanese sound artist Tarek Atoui, and has been resident artist at the Museum of the History of Polish Jews in Warsaw, where he created a site-specific performance.

As an improvisor, he has played with John Zorn, Henry Kaiser, Kurt Dahlke (aka Pyrolator), Raoul Björkenheim, Elliott Sharp, John Tchicai, Ned Rothenberg, David Rothenberg, Marilyn Crispell, Michael Manring, Benoît Delbecq, Gianni Gebbia, Mari Kimura, George Lewis, Gary Lucas, Wadada Leo Smith, DJ Spooky, Thollem McDonas, Jon Rose, Jim O´Rourke, members of Sonic Youth and The Grateful Dead, and many others.

He leads or co-leads bands such as Hypercolor (with Eyal Maoz and James Ilgenfritz), Notebook, and Burkina Electric.

He frequently performs solo on electronic percussion, especially with the Marimba Lumina, an instrument designed by renowned synthesizer engineer Don Buchla. He is one of the very few musicians performing on this instrument.

CDs of his music have been released by Tzadik, Cantaloupe, Intuition, Innova, Leo, among other record labels, and he is endorsed by the drum sticks brand Vic Firth.

== Recognitions and awards ==
Ligeti was recipient of the CalArts Herb Alpert Arts Award in the Music category in 2010.

Ligeti is a two-time recipient of the New York Foundation for the Arts Composition Fellowship (2002, 2008), of the Austrian State Grant for Composition (1991, 1996), and was awarded the “Förderungspreis” of the City of Vienna in 1990, a 1993 award of the Republic of Austria and composition fellowships and grants by the Arts Council of Santa Clara County/California and the Austrian state.

In 2013 and 2015–19, he has been listed as a “Rising Star” percussionist in the Critics’ Poll of the leading jazz magazine DownBeat; he was also the winner of the NYC-based “UnCaged Toy Piano” composition competition in 2013.

Residencies have included Villa Montalvo (Saratoga, California), the Emily Harvey Foundation (Venice, Italy), Acéfalo Festival (Santiago, Chile) and Sonoscopia (Porto, Portugal).

== Personal life ==
Ligeti lived for 30 years in the United States (in the Bay Area of California from 1994 to 1996; in New York City from 1998 to 2015; in Irvine, California from 2015 to 2021; in and Miami in 2021). He later lived in Johannesburg, South Africa, and has been based in Brussels, Belgium since September 2024. He has stated that both of his parents came from Jewish families that had been assimilated into Hungarian culture, and that he grew up without "any kind of Jewish culture or religion."

== Discography (selected) ==
- 1991: Things Of Now Now – Nownowism
- 1993: Kombinat M – Hybrid Beat
- 1997: Lukas Ligeti & Beta Foly – Lukas Ligeti & Beta Foly
- 2003: Raoul Björkenheim & Lukas Ligeti – Shadowglow
- 2004: Lukas Ligeti – Mystery System
- 2008: Lukas Ligeti – Afrikan Machinery
- 2010: Burkina Electric – Paspanga
- 2011: Lukas Ligeti, Benoît Delbecq, Gianni Gebbia, Aly Keita & Michael Manring – Pattern Time
- 2014: Lukas Ligeti & Thollem McDonas – Imaginary Images
- 2015: Hypercolor – Hypercolor
- 2021: Lukas Ligeti - That Which Has Remained... That Which Will Emerge...
- 2026: Lukas Ligeti - Notebook

== See also ==
- List of Austrians in music
