= Fehlfarben =

German Neue Deutsche Welle rock band

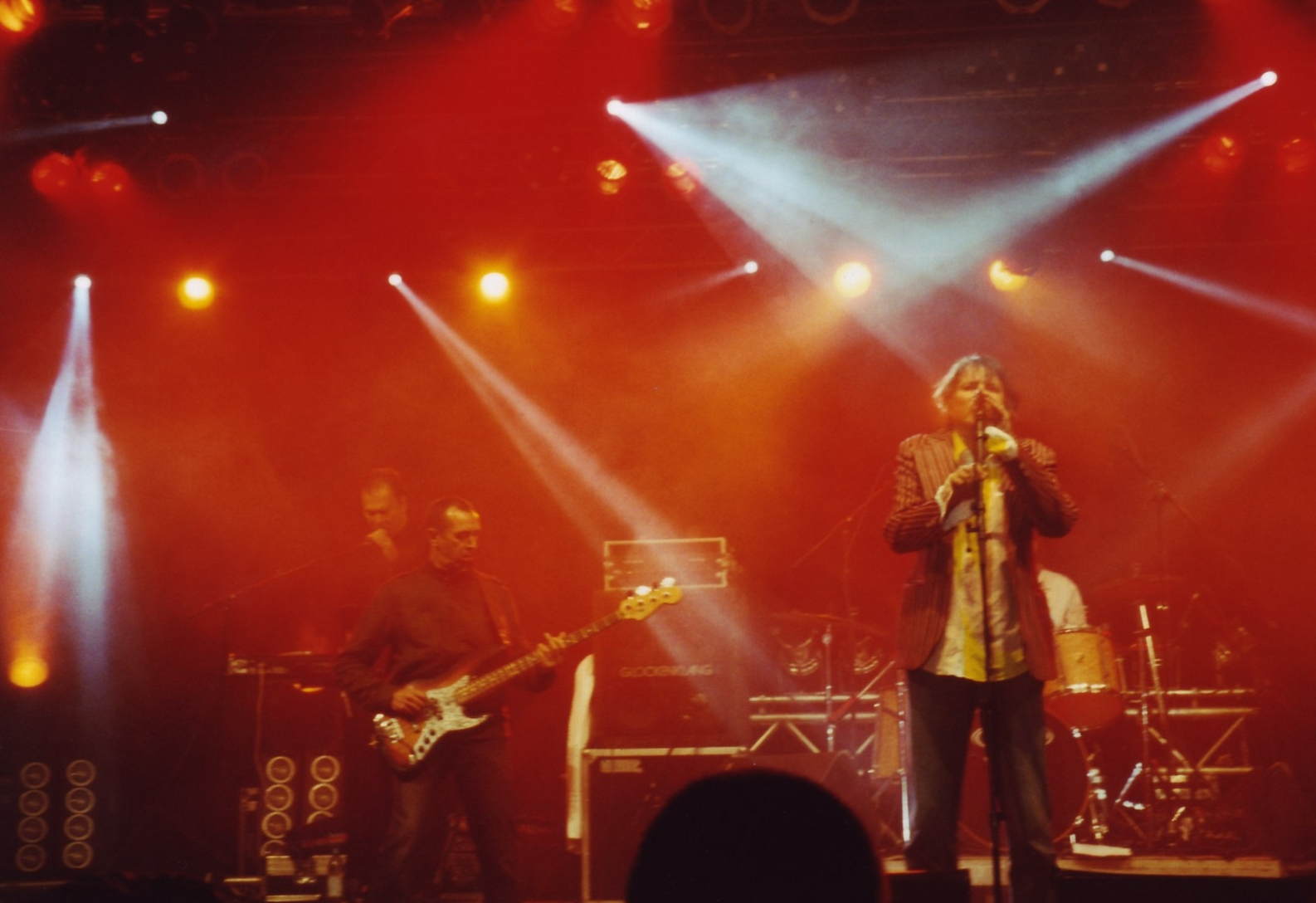
- Fehlfarben in 2006

Background information
- Origin: Düsseldorf, North Rhine-Westphalia, Germany
- Genres: Neue Deutsche Welle, German punk
- Years active: 1979–present
- Labels: Welt-Rekord, EMI Electrola, WEA, Plattenmeister, Tapete, V2, Ata Tak, !K7 Records
- Members: Frank Fenstermacher, Kurt Dahlke, Peter Hein, Saskia von Klitzing, Thomas Schneider
- Past members: Hellmut Hattler, Thomas Schwebel, Uwe Bauer, Uwe Jahnke, Michael Kemner
- Website: fehlfarben.com

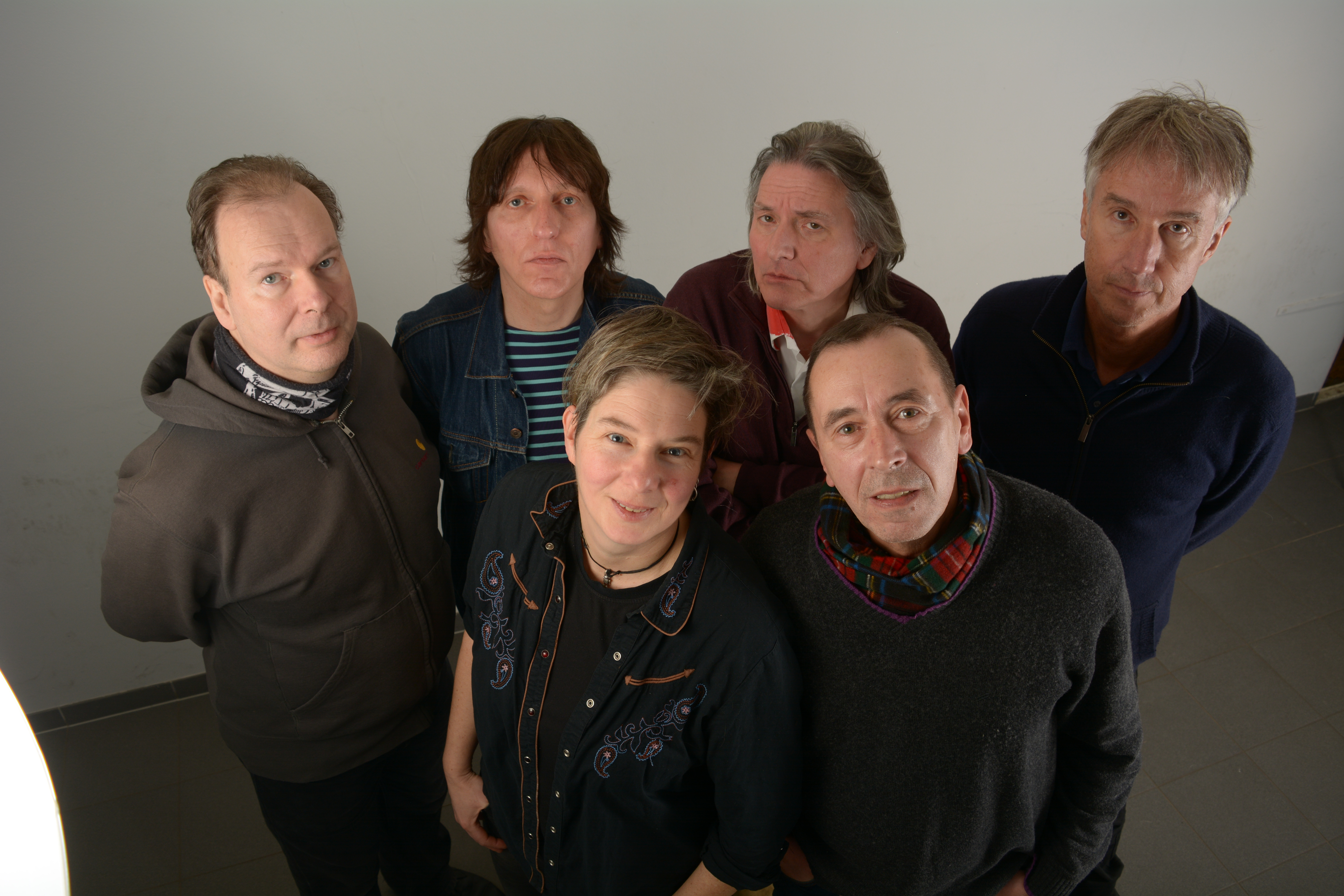
Fehlfarben Members 2016. Back left to right: Kurt Dahlke, Thomas Schneider, Peter Hein, Frank Fenstermacher. Front: Saskia von Klitzing and Michael Kemner

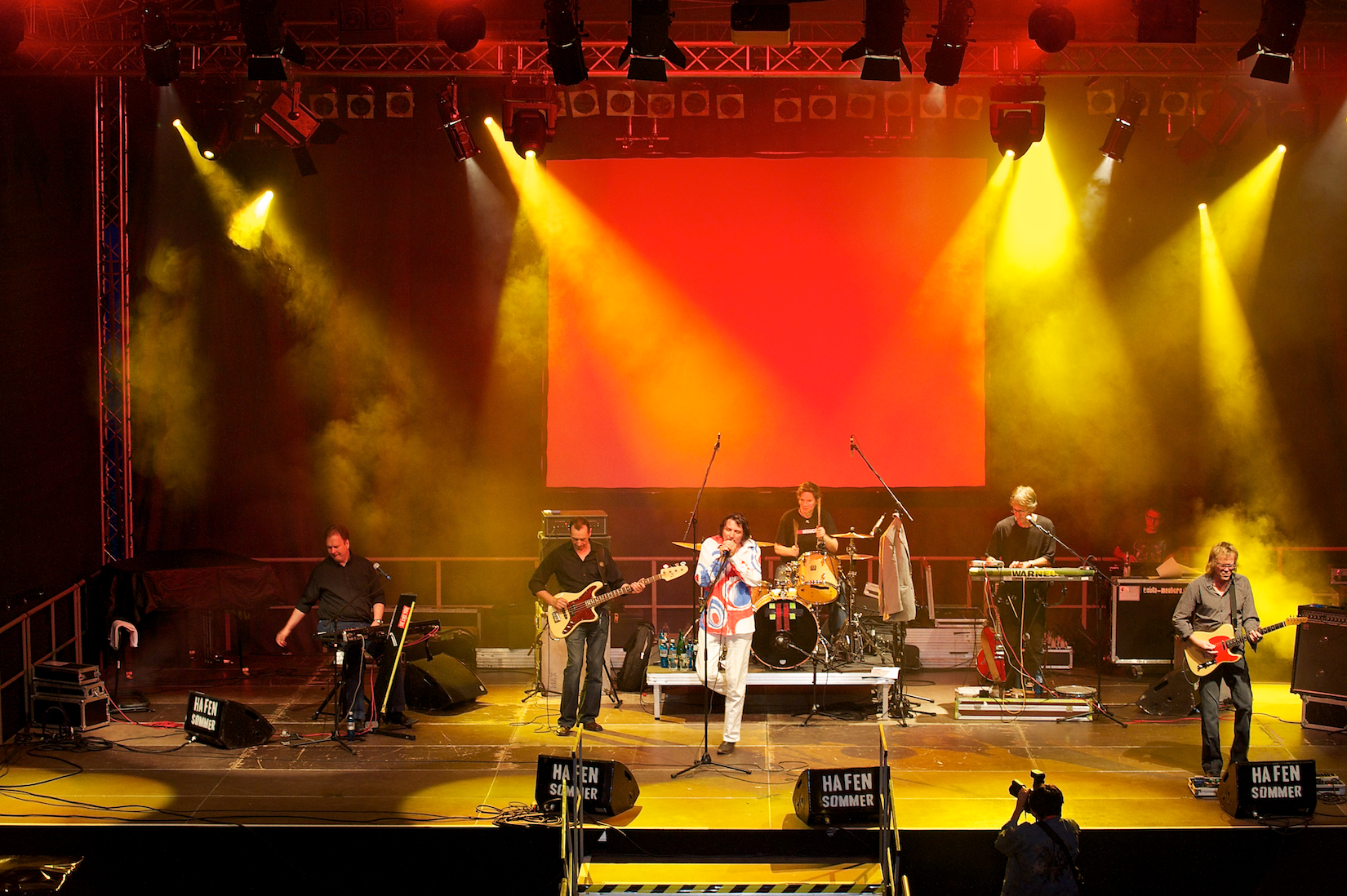

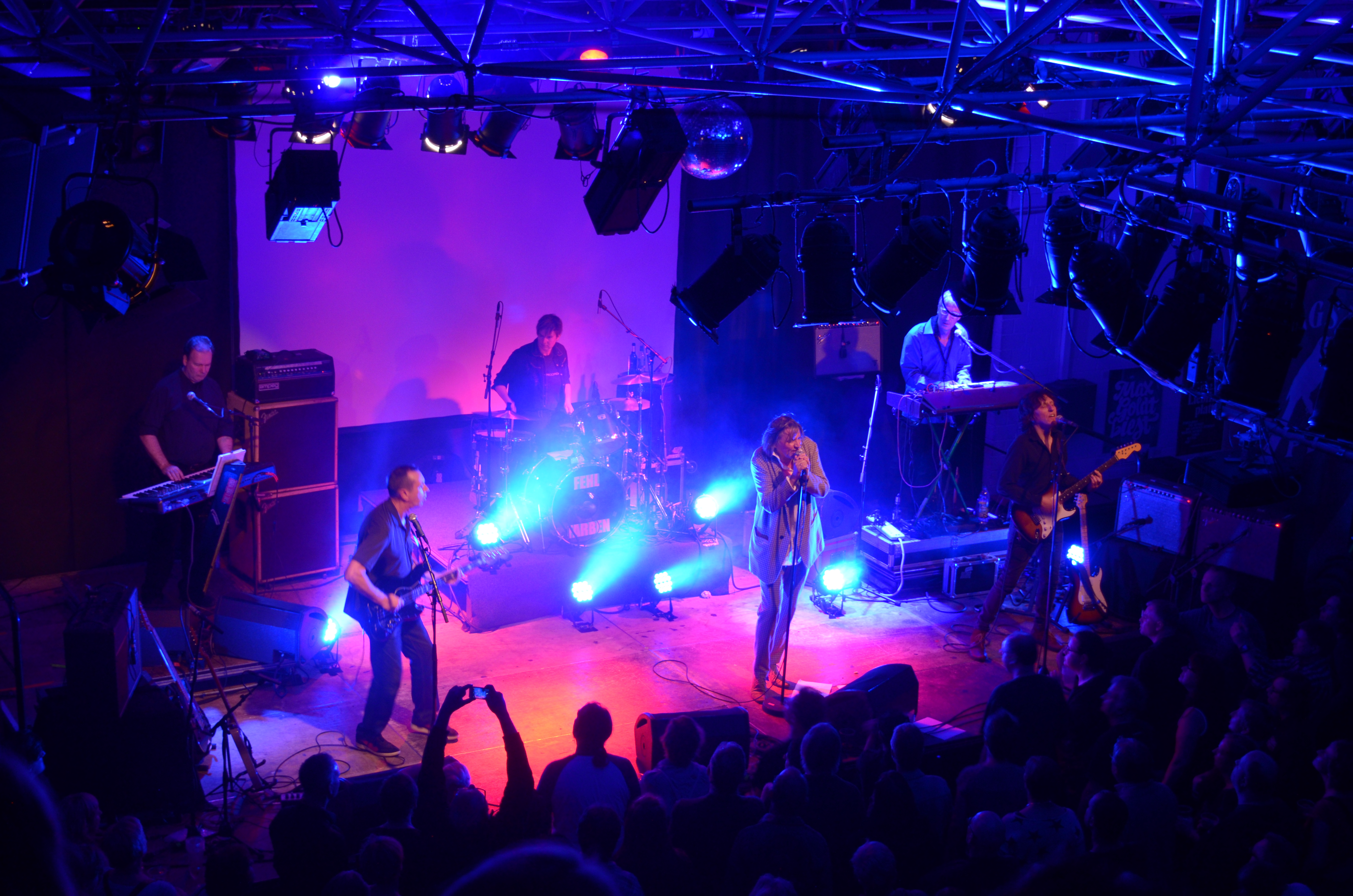
Fehlfarben ZAKK Düsseldorf, 10. Dez. 2016

Fehlfarben is a Neue Deutsche Welle music band from Düsseldorf, Germany, that was formed in 1979. Its founding members were Peter Hein (vocals), former member of the German punk band Mittagspause (English translation: "lunch break"), Thomas Schwebel (guitar, former member of Mittagspause, and German punk band S.Y.P.H.), Michael Kemner (bass, former member of 20 Colors, Mau Mau, DAF, YOU), Frank Fenstermacher (saxophone, later a member of Der Plan), Markus Oehlen and Uwe Bauer (drums, former Mittagspause, Materialschlacht).

== Band name ==
The band name is derived from the German word for the non-trump suits in card games - most notably "Skat".

== Band history ==
Fehlfarben was formed in 1979 out of members of the German punk band Mittagspause and other musicians from the Düsseldorf punk scene. Initially moving away from the Clash and Wire influenced punk of Mittagspause to experiment with ska, Fehlfarben settled into a sound perhaps most comparable to their English contemporaries Gang of Four. Signing a contract with the German subsidiary of EMI lost them their status as an underground band, but in 1980 they released their debut, Monarchie und Alltag (Monarchy and everyday life), an album recognized then and now as one of the most important German-language rock records. Despite its cultural impact, Monarchie und Alltag did not reach gold status in Germany until 2000.

The single "Ein Jahr (Es geht voran)" ("One Year (It's moving onward)") from Monarchie und Alltag, which would be their only hit single, was in fact disliked by the band members themselves, who had initially produced its slick disco groove more in jest than seriousness.

Shortly after having released their debut album, Fehlfarben suffered the departure of lead singer Peter Hein owing to his frustration at the follow-up tour's being lengthened from three to six weeks on short notice. He went back to his day job at Xerox, where he worked until 2003. The band released two more albums without Hein during the 1980s, 33 Tage in Ketten (English translation: 33 days in chains) and Glut und Asche (English translation: Blaze and ashes), with only the latter making it onto the German charts. After struggles with their label, they disbanded at the end of 1984.

The first comeback with all the original members took place in 1990s; it saw (to mixed reviews) the release of two LPs: Die Platte des himmlischen Friedens (English translation: The record of heavenly peace) and Popmusik und Hundezucht (English translation: Pop music and dog breeding).

In 2002, the band launched another comeback behind the album Knietief im Dispo (English translation: Knee deep in the overdraft loan). The album coincided with a general revival of interest in the early days of German punk and new wave. This reunion has been productive; their 2002 album has been followed by seven additional albums over the interim 20 years, and they continue to perform live. The latest of these is the studio album titled ?0??, which was released in 2022.

Bass guitarist Michael Kemner died from cancer on 3 January 2026, aged 72.

== Discography ==
=== Studio albums ===
1. Monarchie und Alltag (Welt-Rekord, EMI Electrola 1980)
2. 33 Tage in Ketten (Welt-Rekord, EMI Electrola 1981)
3. Glut und Asche (Welt-Rekord, EMI Electrola 1983)
4. Die Platte des Himmlischen Friedens (Königshaus, 1991)
5. Popmusik und Hundezucht (Plattenmeister, D.D.R. 1995, recorded 1984)
6. Knietief im Dispo (!K7 Records, Wonder, 2002)
7. 26½ (V2, 2006)
8. Handbuch für die Welt (V2, 2007)
9. Glücksmaschinen (Tapete, 2010)
10. Xenophonie (Tapete, 2012)
11. Über … Menschen (Tapete, 2015)
12. ?0?? (Tapete, 2022)

=== Live albums ===
- Live (Ata Tak, 1993)
- Live hier und jetzt (Ata Tak, 2009)
- Live 1980 (2022, Minimalkombinat)

=== Singles ===
- "Große Liebe" - Maxi/Abenteuer & Freiheit (1980)
- "Das Wort ist draußen" / "Wie bitte was?!" (1981)
- "Ein Jahr (Es geht voran)" (1982)
- "14 Tage" (1982)
- "Untitled" (1982)
- "Agenten in Raucherkinos" (1983)
- "Tag und Nacht" (1983)
- "Magnificent Obsession" (1983)
- "Keine ruhige Minute" / "Der Himmel weint" (1985)
- "Ein Jahr (Es geht voran)" (Remix) (1990)
- "In Zeiten wie diesen" (1991)
- "Es war vor Jahren" / "Das sind die Leute" (1991)
- "In Zeiten wie diesen" (1991)
- "Club der schönen Mütter" (2002)
- "Alkoholen" (2003)
- "Der Chef" / "Das war vor Jahren" (Live) (2003) - with Rockformation Diskokugel
- "Wir warten" (2010)
- "Wir warten (Ihr habt die Uhr, wir die Zeit)" (2010)
- "Platz da!!" (2012)

=== Samplers (selected) ===
- 1995 Die Deutschen Wave Klassiker (Columbia)
- 2002 Verschwende Deine Jugend (Punk Und New Wave In Deutschland 1977-83) (Universal)
- 2002 New Noises Vol. 56 (Rolling Stone)
- 2002 Party Kult Hits Neue Deutsche Welle (Sony)
- 2002 Pop & Wave - More Hits Of The 80's Vol. 2 (Sony)
- 2002 Don't Stop The 80's Vol. 4 - Die Deutsche (Warner)
- 2004 Punk Rock BRD Volume 2 (Weird System)
- 2006 - Silver Monk Time - A Tribute to The Monks (29 bands cover The Monks) play loud! productions
- 2007 New Wave (The Platinum Collection) (EMI)
- 2007 Ox-Compilation #71 (Ox-Fanzine)
- 2010 New Noises 98 (Rolling Stone)

== Literature ==
- Jürgen Teipel, Verschwende Deine Jugend Suhrkamp 2001, ISBN 3-518-39771-0.
- Shahan, Cyrus. Punk Rock and German Crisis: Adaptation and Resistance After 1977. Bielefeld: Springer/Palgrave Macmillan, 2013. ISBN 1137343664.
- Rüdiger Esch, Electri_City. Elektronische Musik aus Düsseldorf 1970–1986. Suhrkamp, Berlin 2014, ISBN 978-3-51846464-9.
- Sven-André Dreyer, Michael Wenzel, Thomas Stelzmann. Keine Atempause – Musik aus Düsseldorf. Droste, Düsseldorf 2018, 192 S., ISBN 978-3-7700-2067-6.
- Armin Owzar. „ein jahr (es geht voran)“. Ein Abgesang auf die Moderne, in: Barbara Stambolis, Jürgen Reulecke (Hrsg.): Good-Bye Memories? Lieder im Generationengedächtnis des 20. Jahrhunderts. Klartext, Essen 2007, S. 409–426.
- Jeff Hayton: Culture from the Slums: Punk Rock in East and West Germany. Oxford University Press, 2022. ISBN 9780198866183.
