= Mellow Mark =

German musician

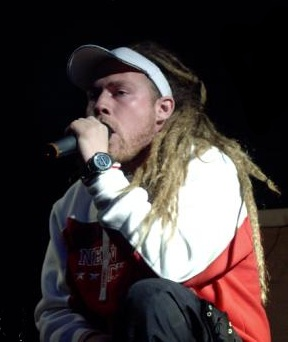
Mellow Mark

Mark Schlumberger (born 23 May 1974), better known as Mellow Mark, is a German rap, reggae and soul musician.

== Bio ==
Mellow Mark grew up in Bayreuth and started his musical career in the early 1990s with the band Loewenherz. After several setbacks with this project, he adopted the name "Mellow Mark" and returned to his street musician roots.

In 2003, Mellow Mark received the ECHO Best National Newcomer award and in 2005 he received the Reggae Awards Album of the Year award for his album Das 5te Element (The Fifth Element).

== Discography ==
=== Albums ===
- 2003: Sturm
- 2004: Das 5te Element
- 2007: Metropolis
- 2009: Ratz Fatz Peng
- 2013: L.I.E.B.E (Live)
- 2015: Roots & Flugel
- 2017: Nomade

=== EPs ===
- 2002: Revolution

=== 7 inch ===
- 2003: Dein Wort in Gottes Ohr feat. Pyro
- 2004: Was geht ab mit der Liebe

=== 12 inch ===
- 2003: Feuer/Hunger
- 2002: Revolution Mixes
- 2003: Weltweit

=== Maxi-Singles ===
- 2003: Dein Wort In Gottes Ohr feat. Pyro
- 2003: Weltweit
- 2003: Butterfly
- 2004: Konsum feat. Cashma Hoody
- 2005: Ay Muchacho feat. MassiveSound & Pyro
- 2005: Comeback feat. Culcha Candela & Martin Jondo
- 2006: Astronaut
- 2007: Metropolis
- 2008: Winter
- 2008: YeahYeahYeah
- 2012: Maine Stadt feat. Tanzkinder
