= 1st Step to Heaven =

- Original 1986 LP sleeve

Studio album by Deutsch Amerikanische Freundschaft
- Released: 1986
- Recorded: 1985–1986
- Studio: Hartmann Digital Studio
- Genre: Eurodisco
- Label: Dean/Ariola
- Producer: Deutsch Amerikanische Freundschaft

Deutsch Amerikanische Freundschaft chronology
Für immer (1982)	1st Step to Heaven (1986)	Fünfzehn neue D.A.F.-Lieder (2003)

CD cover
- 1989 Hitz Blitz

Professional ratings
Review scores
Source	Rating
AllMusic	2.5/5 stars

1st Step to Heaven is a 1986 album by Deutsch Amerikanische Freundschaft, released on Dean Records via Ariola in Europe.

It is their only album in English rather than German. Singer Gabi Delgado-López later noted: "So we wanted to break our own rules and said: OK, so now we sing in English, now we don’t wear black. (laughing) With purpose. Because we wanted to break our own rules."

The album charted for one week on the Swedish album charts at No. 46. The first single from the album, "Voulez-vous coucher avec moi ce soir" (an original, though the title is a quote from the lyrics of "Lady Marmalade"), reached No. 47 on the German singles chart (charting for 7 weeks) and No. 17 on the Belgian singles chart (charting for 5 weeks). Another single, "Brothers", reached No. 23 on the Belgian singles chart (charting for 4 weeks).

The band reunited to make the album but split again soon after its release.

A variant track listing was released in the US as Hitz Blitz in 1989.

== Track listing ==
- All songs written and arranged by DAF, except where noted.
- LP (Dean 207 435)

Side A:
1. "Voulez-vous coucher avec moi" 5:04
2. "Opium" 1:58
3. "Brothers" 3:55
4. "Voulez-vous coucher avec moi Part II" 5:13 (Bob Crewe, Kenny Nolan, Gorl)
Side B:
1. "Sex Up" 3:26
2. "Pure Joy" 3:30
3. "Party" 3:23
4. "1st Step to Heaven" 5:53

- CD (Dean 257 435)
1. "Voulez-vous coucher avec moi - Part I" (2:25)
2. "Pure Joy" (4:47)
3. "Blond Hair Dark Brown Hair" (3:10)
4. "Sex Up" (3:15)
5. "Absolute Bodycontrol" (5:18)
6. "Voulez-vous coucher avec moi - Part II" (5:28)
7. "Crazy Crazy" (3:08)
8. "Opium" - Mix (2:10)
9. "Brother/Brother" (3:37)
10. "1st Step to Heaven" - Mix (5:46)
- Hitz Blitz CD (JCI JCD-9027)
1. "The Gun" ("Powder Keg Mix") 8:22
2. "Voulez-vous coucher avec moi Part 2" 5:28
3. "Pure Joy" 4:47
4. "Brothers" 3:37
5. "Absolute Bodycontrol" 5:18
6. "Sex Up" 3:15
7. "Voulez-vous coucher avec moi Part 1" 2:25
8. "1st Step to Heaven Medley" 8:07
9. "Opium Mix" 2:10
10. "Crazy Crazy" 3:08
11. "Blond Hair Dark Brown Hair" 3:10
12. "1st Step to Heaven Mix" 5:46
13. "The Gun" ("Bang Bang Mix") 6:23
