= Gold und Liebe =

- Original 1981 LP sleeve

Studio album by Deutsch Amerikanische Freundschaft
- Released: 1981
- Recorded: August–September 1981
- Studio: Conny Plank's Studio, Neunkirchen, Germany
- Genre: Electropunk
- Length: 35:38
- Label: Virgin
- Producer: Conny Plank

Deutsch Amerikanische Freundschaft chronology
Alles ist gut (1981)	Gold und Liebe (1981)	Für immer (1982)

Singles from Gold und Liebe
- 1. "Goldenes Spielzeug" Released: 1981; 2. "Liebe auf den ersten Blick" Released: 1981; 3. "Sex unter Wasser / Knochen auf Knochen" Released: 1981

Professional ratings
Review scores
Source	Rating
AllMusic	3.5/5 stars

Gold und Liebe (Gold and Love) is the fourth album by Deutsch Amerikanische Freundschaft, released on Virgin Records in 1981. It was produced by Conny Plank.

The album was in the German charts for 21 weeks, peaking at No. 35, and the Austrian charts for 10 weeks, peaking at No. 4.

The album was reissued on Mute Records in 1998.

== Reception ==
In 2007 the album was included in The Guardian list 1000 Albums to Hear Before You Die.

The AllMusic Guide to Electronica describes the album as "a touch less powerful than on Alles" and not as immediately varied. Trouser Press, contrastingly, considers that the album "perfects the advances of Alles ist gut". Simon Reynolds, in Rip It Up and Start Again: Postpunk 1978–1984, describes it as touching on themes of alchemy: "the notion that instead of chasing the profane gold of material wealth, the true quest is for gold of the spirit."

== Track listing ==
Side A:

1. "Liebe auf den ersten Blick" (Love at First Sight) 3:58
2. "El Que" 3:33
3. "Sex unter Wasser" (Sex Under Water) 3:04
4. "Was ziehst du an heute Nacht" (What Are You Going to Wear Tonight) 3:46
5. "Goldenes Spielzeug" (Golden Toy) 3:56

Side B:

1. "Ich will" (I Want) 3:19
2. "Muskel" (Muscle) 3:23
3. "Absolute Körperkontrolle" (Absolute Body Control) 3:12
4. "Verschwende deine Jugend" (Waste Your Youth) 3:48
5. "Greif nach den Sternen" (Reach for the Stars) 3:41
