= Gabi Delgado-López =

Spanish-German singer (1958–2020)

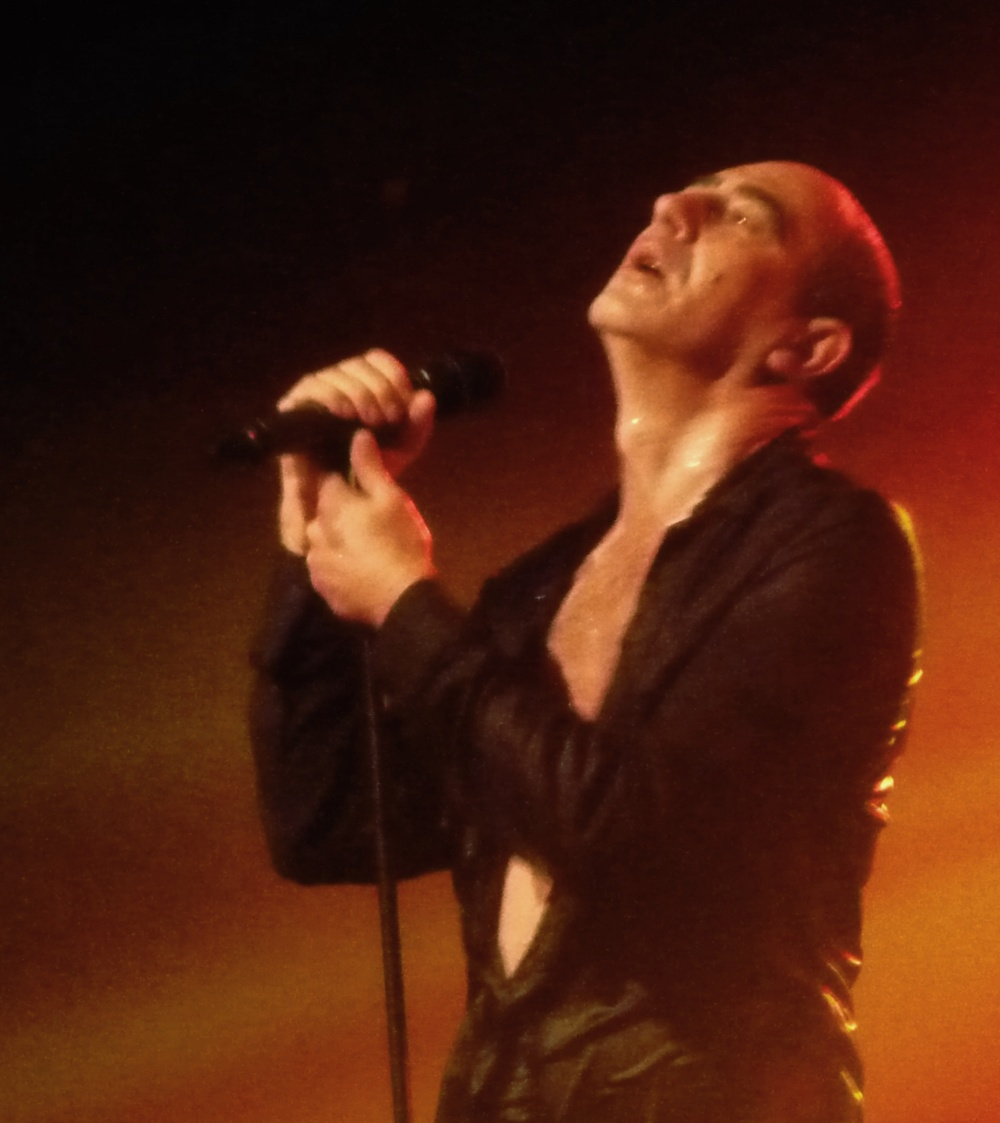
- Delgado-López live with D.A.F. at Alte Seilerei, Germany, 2012

Background information
- Born: Gabriel Delgado-López; 18 April 1958; Córdoba, Spain
- Died: 22 March 2020 (aged 61) Andalusia, Spain (or Lisbon, Portugal)
- Genres: EBM
- Instruments: Vocals, synthesizer
- Years active: 1978–2020

Gabriel Delgado-López (18 April 1958 – 22 March 2020), commonly known as Gabi Delgado, was a Spanish-born German composer, lyricist and producer, best known as singer and co-founder, with Robert Görl, of the German electronic band Deutsch Amerikanische Freundschaft.

== Biography ==
Delgado-López grew up in Córdoba. In 1966, his family moved to Germany ("My father had to leave Spain under Franco"), where they lived in Remscheid, Wuppertal, Dortmund and Düsseldorf.

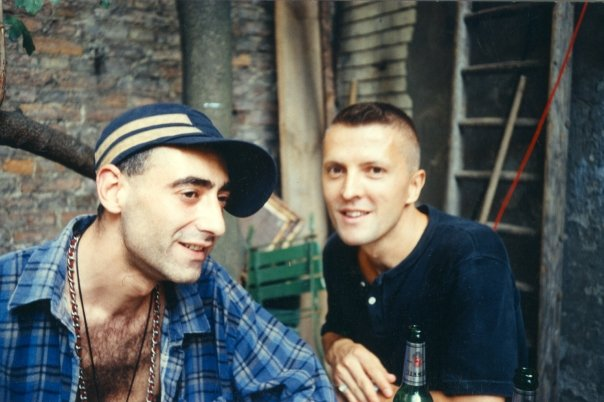
Delgado-López with Robert Görl

He formed D.A.F. with Görl in 1978. In 1980, he moved to London, where he lived until D.A.F. first split in 1982. He then moved to Zürich and released the solo album Mistress, which did not sell well in Germany but was top 20 in Japan, then reuniting with Görl to record the 1986 D.A.F. album 1st Step to Heaven.

In 1986, he moved to Berlin to become a DJ and organise house parties. He organized (with WestBam and Marc Gubler) the first house party in Germany. With Saba Komossa, he founded the techno-house labels Delkom Club Control, BMWW and Sunday Morning Berlin.

In 1995, he founded, with Wotan Wilke Möhring, the band DAF/DOS, who recorded the album Allein, zu zweit, mit Telefon (Alone, As A Couple, With Telephone) on Sony/Columbia, with the singles "Ich glaub' ich fick' dich später" ("I Think I'll Fuck You Later") and "Zurück nach Marzahn" ("Back to Marzahn"). In 2003, Delgado reunited again with Görl for another D.A.F. album, Fünfzehn neue D.A.F-Lieder (Fifteen New D.A.F. Songs).

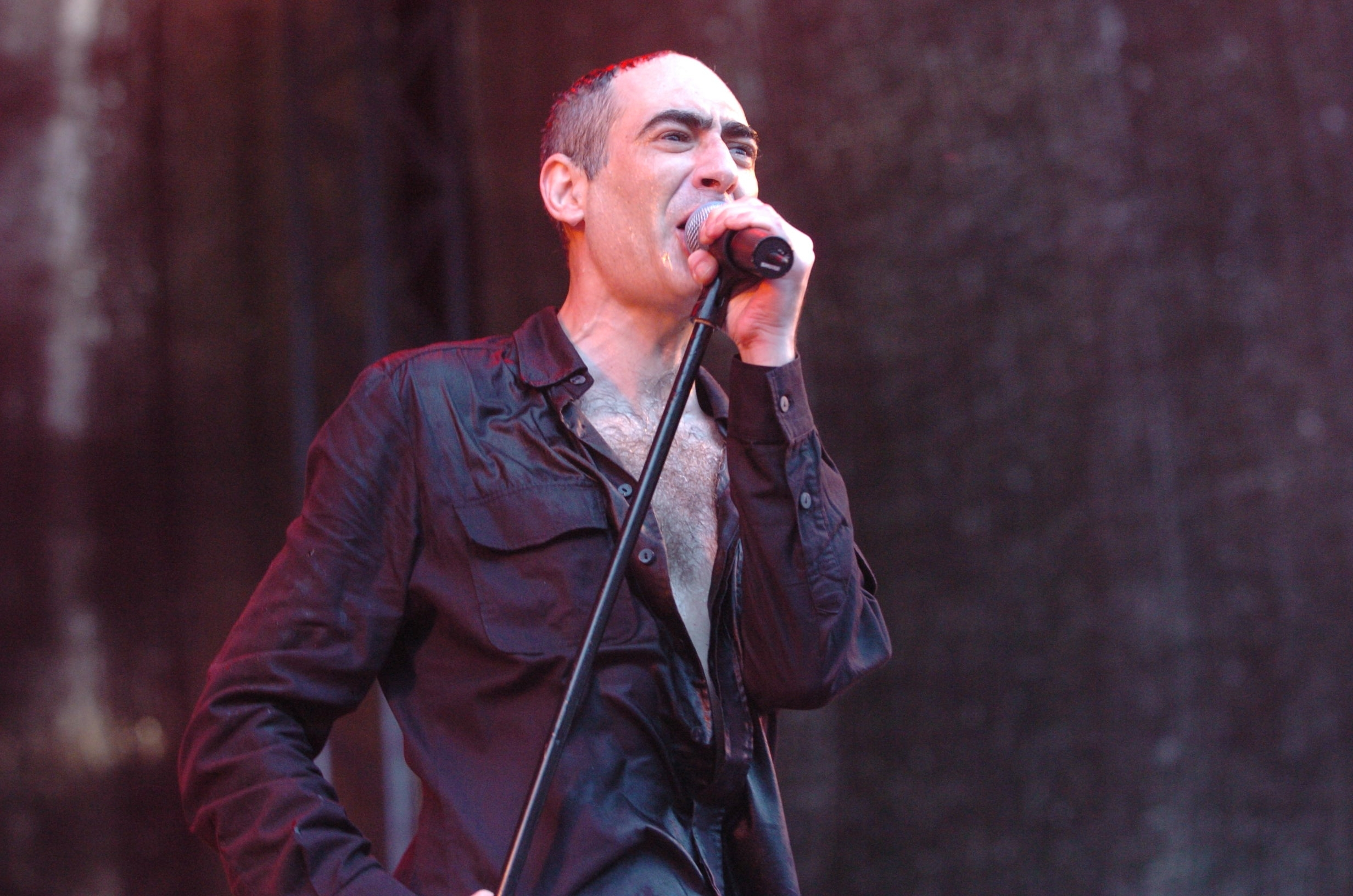
Live with D.A.F. in 2007

His brother, Eduardo Delgado-López, is a bass player.

Delgado-López was bisexual and spoke at length about it publicly.

Delgado-López died of a heart attack on 22 March 2020. Sources differ on his death place; some say he died in a hospital in Portugal, while Deutschlandfunk say he died in his birth place of Córdoba. He was 61.

== Discography ==
Solo:

- Mistress (1983)
- Eins (2014)
- Zwei (2015)

with DAF:

- Die Kleinen und die Bösen (1980)
- Alles ist gut (1981)
- Gold und Liebe (1981)
- Für immer (1982)
- 1st Step to Heaven (1986)
- Fünfzehn neue D.A.F.-Lieder (2003)

Note: Although Delgado-López had previously been a member of DAF, he temporarily left the band before they recorded Ein Produkt der Deutsch-Amerikanischen Freundschaft (1979), hence this debut album is a series of instrumentals without his participation.

with Delkom:

- Futur Ultra (1990)

with DAF/DOS:

- Allein, zu zweit, mit Telefon (1996)
- Der DAF/DOS Staat (1999)
- Der DAF/DOS Live Staat (1999)

with Marc Hurtado:

- Neue Weltumfassende Resistance (2025)
