= Deutsch Amerikanische Freundschaft =

German electropunk/Neue Deutsche Welle band

D.A.F.
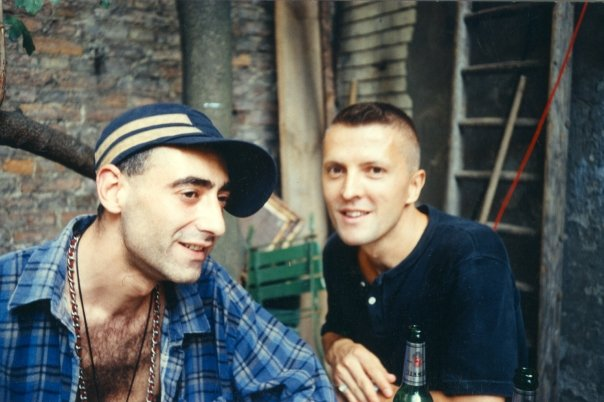
- D.A.F. (Delgado-López left, Görl right)

Background information
- Origin: Düsseldorf, West Germany
- Genres: Electropunk; EBM; NDW; industrial; art punk (early)
- Years active: 1978–1982, 1985–1986, 2002–2003, 2008–2015, 2017–2021
- Labels: Mute; Virgin; Ariola; Superstar; Grönland
- Spinoffs: DAF/DOS; DAF.Partei
- Past members: Robert Görl; Gabriel "Gabi" Delgado-López; Kurt "Pyrolator" Dahlke; Chrislo Haas; Michael Kemner; Wolfgang Spelmans

Deutsch Amerikanische Freundschaft (German pronunciation: [ˈdɔʏtʃ ʔameʁiˈkaːnɪʃə ˈfʁɔʏntʃaft]; "German-American Friendship"), or D.A.F., was a German electropunk/Neue Deutsche Welle band from Düsseldorf, formed in 1978 featuring Gabriel "Gabi" Delgado-López (vocals), Robert Görl (drums, percussion, electronic instruments), Kurt "Pyrolator" Dahlke (electronic instruments), Michael Kemner (bass-guitar) and Wolfgang Spelmans (guitar). Kurt Dahlke was replaced by Chrislo Haas (electronic instruments, bass guitar, saxophone) in 1979. From 1981 onward, the band consisted of Delgado-López and Görl, until López's death due to a heart attack on March 22nd, 2020 at age 61.

In interviews they claimed not to target anything or anyone specific while writing lyrics to be taken as a parody of words and phrases floating around in the public media. "Sato-Sato" and "Der Mussolini" are both examples of songs written around Delgado-López's fascination with the sound of a particular word. A few months before the 2003 invasion of Iraq, D.A.F. released "The Sheriff (An Anti-American Song)".

The album Alles ist gut (all is good) received the German "Schallplattenpreis" award by the "Deutsche Phono-Akademie" (The German Phono-Academy), an association of the German recording industry.

== History ==
=== Formation and early albums ===
Görl came to Düsseldorf in August 1978 and met Delgado as both were regulars at punk club Ratinger Hof. Görl noted, "The earliest line up of DAF was Gabi and me in the basement of the Ratinger Hof. We created our basic ideas and we had a very strong will as a duo. Gabi Delgado played the stylophone and I played the drums." Several early Neue Deutsche Welle bands formed from this social group, and Görl and Delgado played with multiple other bands. The first two D.A.F. albums featured the original four-piece line-up and a range of styles. Their first album, Ein Produkt der Deutsch-Amerikanischen Freundschaft, was released in 1979 on Dahlke's Ata Tak label (then called Warning). The album was 22 improvised untitled instrumentals, Delgado having temporarily left the band at the time.

The band then moved to London. As Delgado later noted, "at that time if you wanted to do new music you’d go to London because that was the center, not Düsseldorf." Daniel Miller signed DAF to Mute Records because "they weren’t relying on past rock traditions at all, which is the criterion of what goes on Mute." DAF recorded Die Kleinen und die Bösen (The Small Ones and the Evil Ones) for Mute, one side studio and most of the other side live. According to the Trouser Press, Ein Produkt... featured "shrieking, colliding overdubbed synths and guitars" while Die Kleinen... presented a more polished sound "with anarchic synthesizer work slowly integrating a solid, defined beat."

=== Virgin trilogy ===
DAF then shrank to just Delgado and Görl, who signed to Virgin Records and released Alles ist gut, their breakthrough album. The band became pop stars in Germany and gained great critical acclaim in the UK.

Görl played drums — usually fairly simple and relatively unsyncopated patterns, but with simple variations that prevented them sounding robotic — while Delgado sang. The only other instruments used were Korg MS-20 and ARP Odyssey analogue synthesizers usually driven by a Korg SQ-10 analog sequencer. Typically only a single sequencer-driven line would be used for a song, the sequence functioning both as melodic accompaniment and as a bassline. The song "Der Mussolini" is a perfect example of this. On other songs, such as the title track, certain notes of the sequence were set slightly out of tune. Over all, the songs entail a complex tension between the predominantly visceral (the voice), the relentlessly robotic (the 16-step sequences), and the drums, which lie somewhere in between. One song, "Der Räuber und der Prinz" ("The Robber and the Prince"), also features a Glockenspiel-like sound as a sinister reminder of childhood.

Alles ist gut sold hundreds of thousands in Germany, and DAF became the fifth-biggest German-speaking group in Germany.

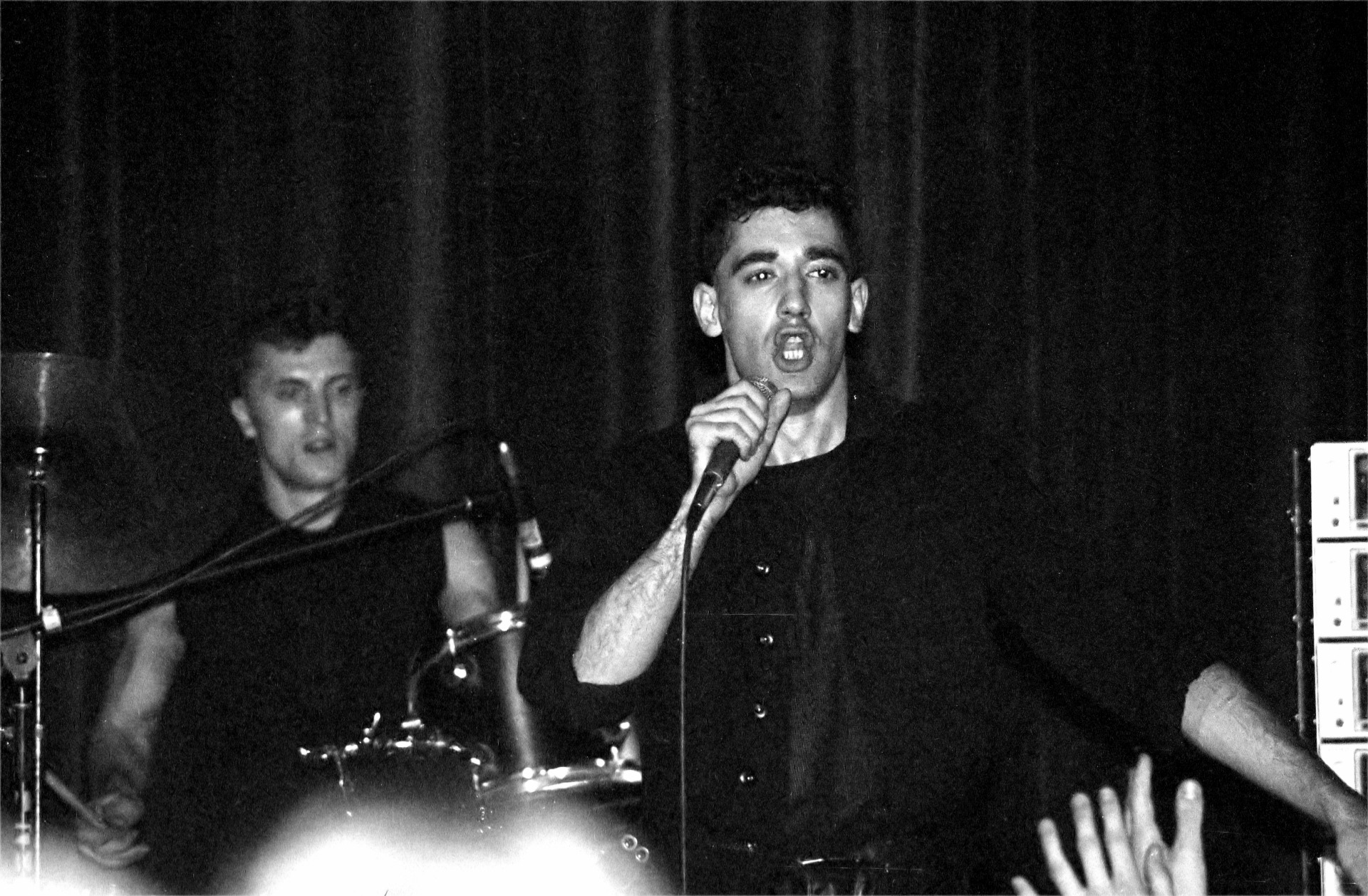
Gabi Delgado-Lopez and Robert Görl onstage, 1981

The next two albums, Gold und Liebe (Gold and Love) and Für Immer (Forever), continued in the same vein, until, as one British music journalist of the time put it, D.A.F. had exhausted all the possibilities of the 16-step sequencer. These possibilities ranged from something resembling rhythm and blues — you could just about play Der Mussolini as R'n'B if you wanted — to the microtonality of Im Dschungel der Liebe (In the Jungle of Love) (on Für immer) or Knochen auf Knochen (the B-side of the single "Sex unter Wasser"). These three albums (from Alles ist gut to Für immer) were all produced by Konrad "Conny" Plank, who was renowned for his pioneering work both with minimalist-influenced Krautrock bands and other experimenters in the 1970s, and with electropop artists in the 1980s. The band added an Oberheim OB-Xa for Für immer.

The band split during the recording of Für immer.

=== Post-split ===
Each member released solo albums: Delgado Mistress (on Virgin), and Görl Night Full Of Tension (on Mute).

Delgado and Görl reunited in 1985 to record 1st Step to Heaven, their only album in English, which achieved one week in the Swedish album chart at no. 46. Delgado later noted: "So we wanted to break our own rules and said: OK, so now we sing in English, now we don’t wear black. (laughing) With purpose. Because we wanted to break our own rules."

During this extensive period their historical importance began to become clearer. Legendary radio DJ John Peel went as far as to call them the Grandfathers of Techno. Both Robert and Gabi had solo musical careers, with Robert becoming a respected techno artist in his own right. Gabi Delgado also recorded two albums as DAF/DOS ('Dos' here referring to the Spanish word for 'two') together with Wotan Wilke.

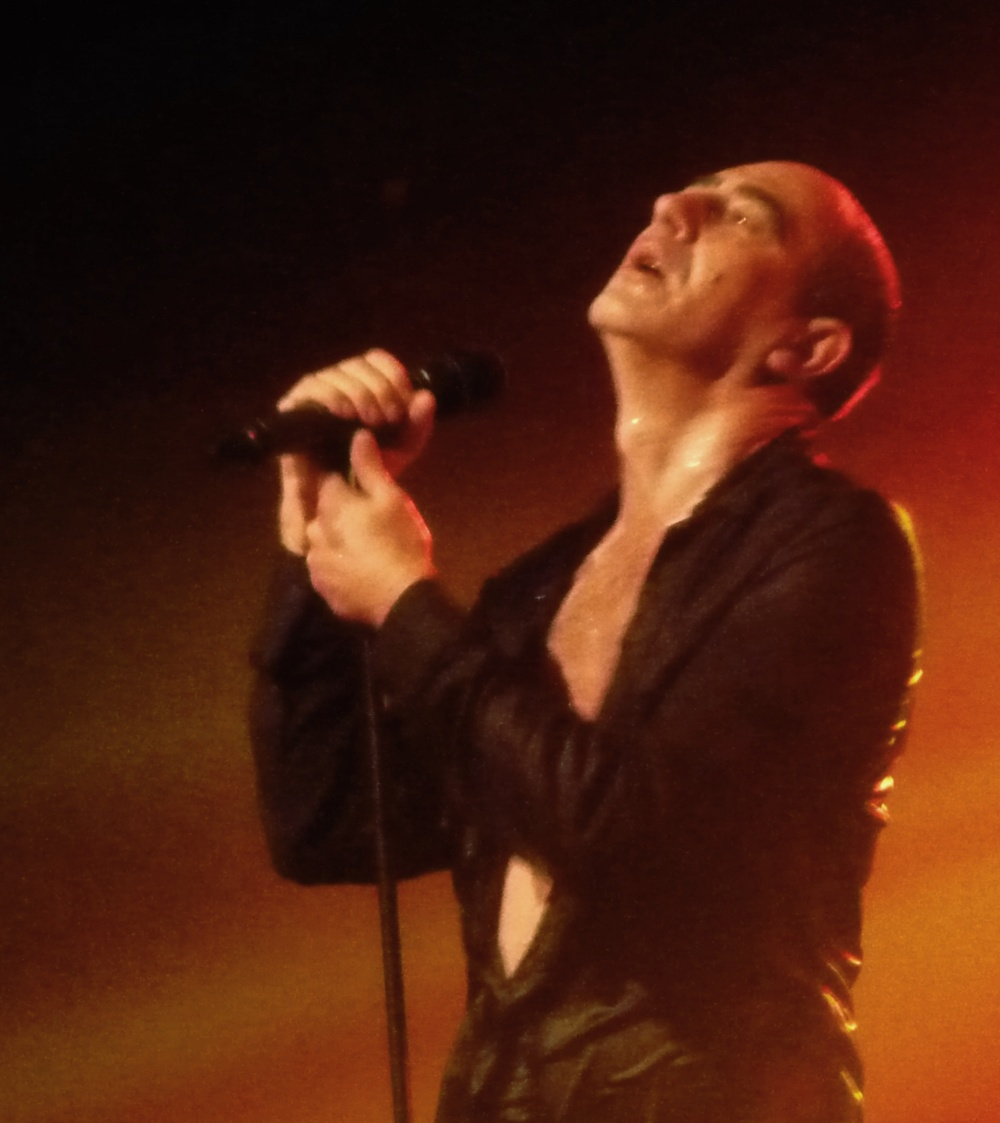
Gabi Delgado-López, DAF live in 2012

When DAF reformed for the 2003 album Fünfzehn neue D.A.F.-Lieder (15 New D.A.F Songs) their style had shifted to a fusion of the classic Plank-produced D.A.F. sound with elements taken from Robert's techno work. The drums were replaced with crisper electronic beats, but the ARP Avatar and, of course, Gabi's vocals remained in place. According to Deutsche Welle, the album "takes specific aim at American cultural imperialism and political dominance" as evidenced by the first single, "Der Sheriff", a song about the George W. Bush administration. "Der Sheriff" peaked at number 2 on the German Alternative Charts (DAC) and ranked number 15 on the DAC Top 100 Singles of 2003.

The band prepared more music, but split before they could make another album. Görl played in 2007 as DAF.Partei with Thoralf Dietrich (from Jäger 90) as lead singer.

Delgado-Lopez and Görl have played occasional reunion shows since their thirtieth anniversary tour in 2008. In 2010, the band returned with a new single "Du bist DAF", limited to 2010 copies. The sound snippet is available via SoundCloud.

The band declared its split again in January 2015, with another farewell tour to start in May.

An authorised biography of the band, "Das ist DAF", written by Miriam Spies and Rudi Esch, was published in 2017. There is no English translation of the text available at present. According to the publisher's page, "This richly illustrated book tells the unique DAF story from the perspective of Gabi Delgado and Robert Görl", both of whom as DAF are "regarded as a forerunner of the techno and EBM scene." DAF also released a box set with the same title as the biography the same year, with a new single, "Die Sprache der Liebe".

Delgado died in 2020. Görl released one last album as DAF, Nur Noch Einer in 2021, based on old DAF tapes and with new lyrics by Görl.

=== Legacy ===
The D.A.F. track "Alle Gegen Alle" was remade by Laibach in 1994. "Der Mussolini" was remade by Atrocity in 1997 and by KMFDM in 2006. Patrik Sampler's 2017 novel The Ocean Container makes reference to "Greif Nach Den Sternen".

== Style ==
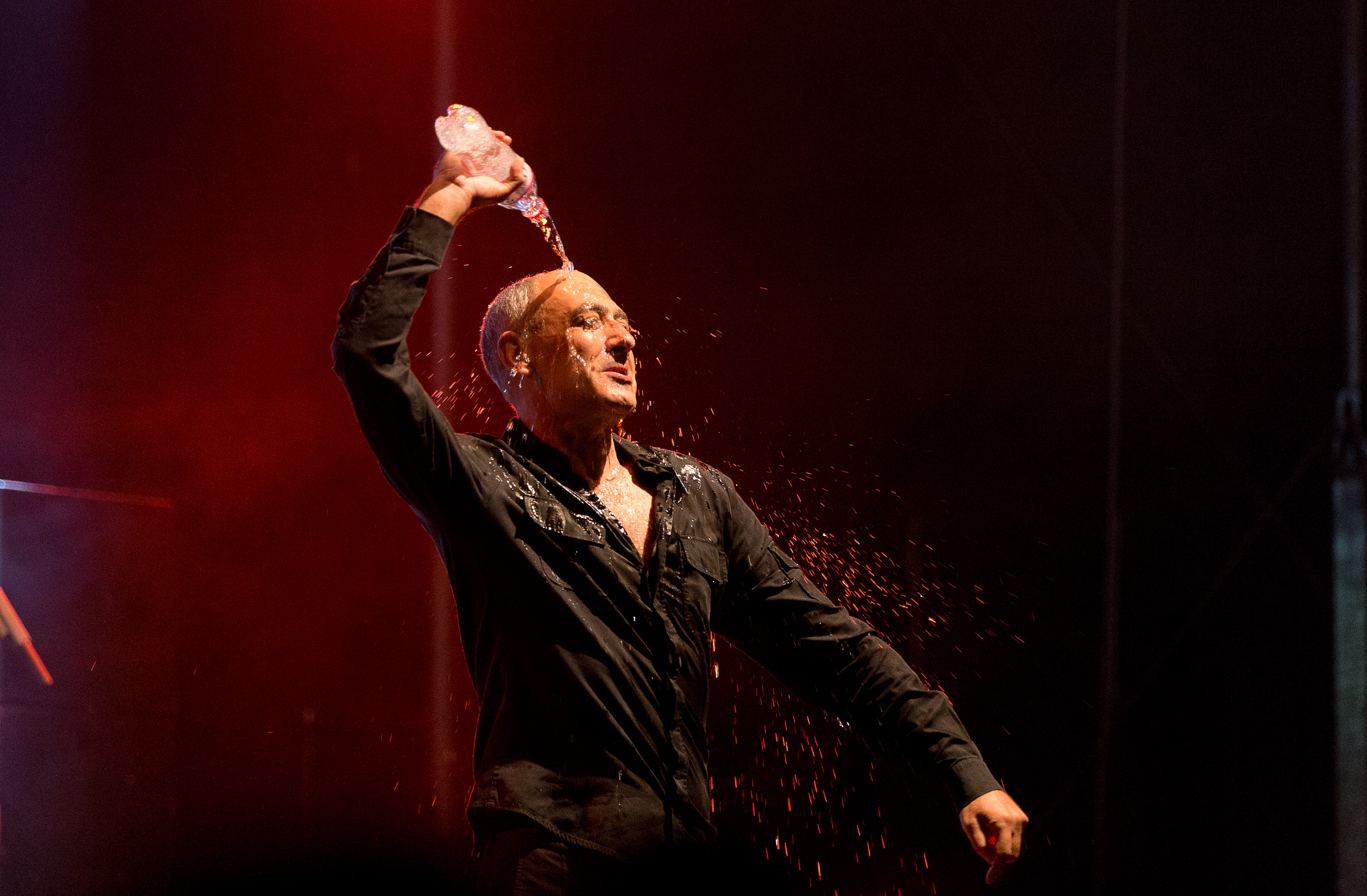
Gabi Delgado-López at Nocturnal Culture Night festival 2016

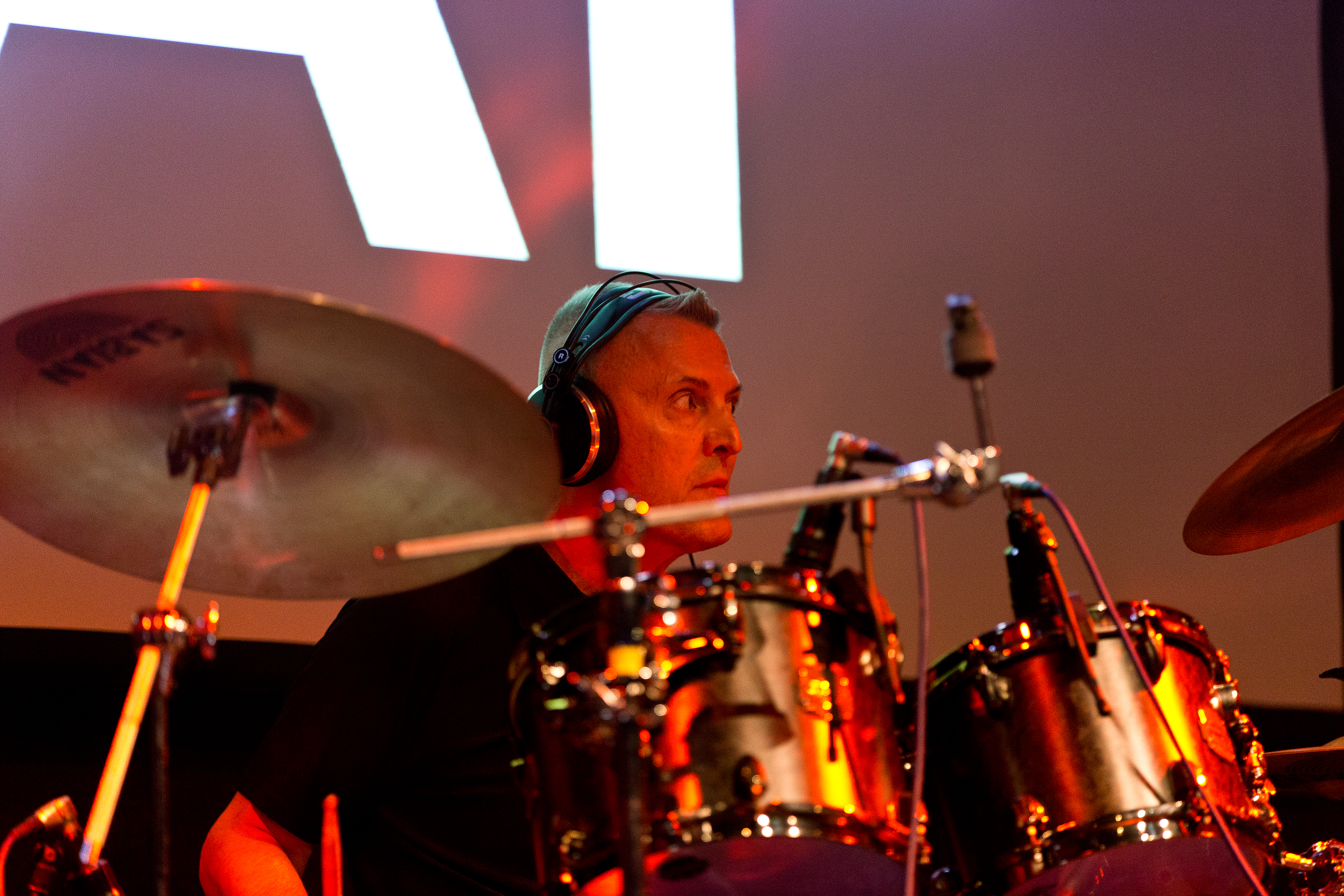
Robert Görl at Nocturnal Culture Night festival 2016

Görl described their sound on Alles ist gut in Melody Maker in 1981:

Most bands get a synthesizer and their first idea is to tune it! They want a clean normal sound. They don’t work with the power you get from a synthesizer ... We want to bring together this high technique with body power so you have the past time mixed with the future.

Delgado described his new vocal style in the same interview:

The singing isn’t like rock ’n’ roll or pop singing. It’s sometimes like in a Hitler speech, not a Nazi thing, but it’s in the German character, that crack! crack! crack! way of speaking.

The band determined early on that they would not sing in English. As Delgado later said:

It’s not only a part of image. It’s a serious matter because DAF from the very first beginning didn’t want to imitate any American pop, rock or whatever. In fact we think there is a very strong American influence in culture, television, music, everywhere. So in the very first beginning one of our main content was to refuse to imitate rock ‘n’ roll, to refuse to sing in English. We don’t do that. We have our own identity. Our identity is not American identity.

As a lyricist, Delgado's concerns throughout D.A.F.'s recording career have ranged from sardonic reflections on ideology and political violence, to journeys into a very physical, even brutal, sexuality, sometimes related from a child's point of view. Having grown up as the child of working class Spanish immigrants in Wuppertal, and coming of age in the politically polarized era of the German Autumn (his response to the left-wing extremism of that time being thematized in the 2003 song "Kinderzimmer (Heldenlied)" ["Childhood Bedroom (Hero Song)"], he was blunt and unromantically detached about social reality in West Germany, and unapologetic about the provocative potential of his songs.

As performers and media personalities D.A.F. were, much like New York's Suicide, forerunners of later 1980s synthpop duos, such as the Pet Shop Boys and Soft Cell, in that the singer (in this case Delgado) appears relatively extroverted while the one who plays with the electronics (Görl) appears quiet and reserved. Visually, at least from Alles ist gut until 1st Step to Heaven, they cultivated an image of black leather, muscles, hairy chests, and sweat.

== Discography ==
=== Studio albums ===
List of studio albums, with selected chart positions and certifications
Title	Album details	Peak chart positions			Notes
Title	Album details	GER	AUS	SWE	Notes
Ein Produkt der Deutsch-Amerikanischen Freundschaft	Released: 1979; Label: Warning; Formats: LP	—	—	—	CD reissue by Mute in 1999
Die Kleinen und die Bösen	Released: 1980; Label: Mute; Formats: LP	—	—	—	CD reissue by Mute in 1990
Alles ist gut	Released: 1981; Label: Virgin; Formats: LP	15	16	—	CD reissue by Mute on 26 October 1998
Gold und Liebe	Released: 1981; Label: Virgin; Formats: LP	35	10	—	CD reissue by Mute on 26 October 1998
Für immer	Released: 1982; Label: Virgin; Formats: LP	—	—	—	CD reissue by Mute on 26 October 1998
1st Step to Heaven	Released: 1986; Label: Dean/Ariola; Formats: LP, CD	—	—	46	—
Fünfzehn neue D.A.F.-Lieder	Released: 24 February 2003; Label: Superstar; Formats: CD	95	—	—	—
Nur Noch Einer	Released: 26 November 2021; Label: Grönland; Formats: CD	—	—	—	—
"—" denotes a recording that did not chart or was not released in that territory.

=== Compilations ===
- D.A.F. (LP, Virgin V-2533, 1988)
- Hitz Blitz (CD, JCI JCD-9027, 1989)
- Der Mussolini (12", The Grey Area, 1998, 5-track compilation EP)
- Das Beste von DAF (CD, Mute DAF-4-CD, 2009)

=== Singles ===
List of singles, with selected chart positions, showing year released and album name
Title	Year	Peak chart positions		Album
Title	Year	GER	BEL (FL)	Album
"Kebab-Träume" / "Gewalt"	1980	—	—	Non-album single
"Als wär's das letzte Mal" / "Der Mussolini"	1981	—	—	Alles ist gut
"Der Räuber und der Prinz" / "Tanz mit mir"	1981	—	—	Alles ist gut
"Goldenes Spielzeug"	1981	—	—	Gold und Liebe
"Liebe auf den ersten Blick"	1981	—	—	Gold und Liebe
"Sex unter Wasser" / "Knochen auf Knochen"	1981	—	—	Gold und Liebe
"Verlieb dich in mich" / "Ein bisschen Krieg"	1982	—	—	Für immer
"Absolute Body Control"	1985	—	—	1st Step to Heaven
"Brothers"	1985	—	23	1st Step to Heaven
"Pure Joy"	1986	—	—	1st Step to Heaven
"Voulez-vous coucher avec moi"	1986	47	17	1st Step to Heaven
"The Gun"	1987	—	—	Hitz Blitz
"Der Mussolini" (Remix)	1987	—	—	Non-album single
"Liebe auf den ersten Blick '88 Remix"	1988	—	—	Non-album single
"Verschwende deine Jugend" / "El que"	1989	—	—	Non-album single
"Der Sheriff" (Anti-Amerikanisches Lied)	2002	—	—	Fünfzehn neue D.A.F.-Lieder
"Du bist DAF"	2010	—	—	Non-album single
"Der Mussolini" (Giorgio Moroder & Denis Naidanow Remix)"	2017	—	—	Non-album single
"Boys Noize / Görl & Hell Remix"	2017	—	—	Non-album single
"Ich denk an dich"	2020	—	—	Non-album single
"—" denotes a recording that did not chart or was not released in that territory.

== Sources ==
- Reynolds, Simon (February 2006). "18: Electric Dreams: Synthpop". Rip It Up and Start Again (paperback) (US ed.). Penguin Books. ISBN 1-4295-2667-X.
