= Deutscher Schallplattenpreis =

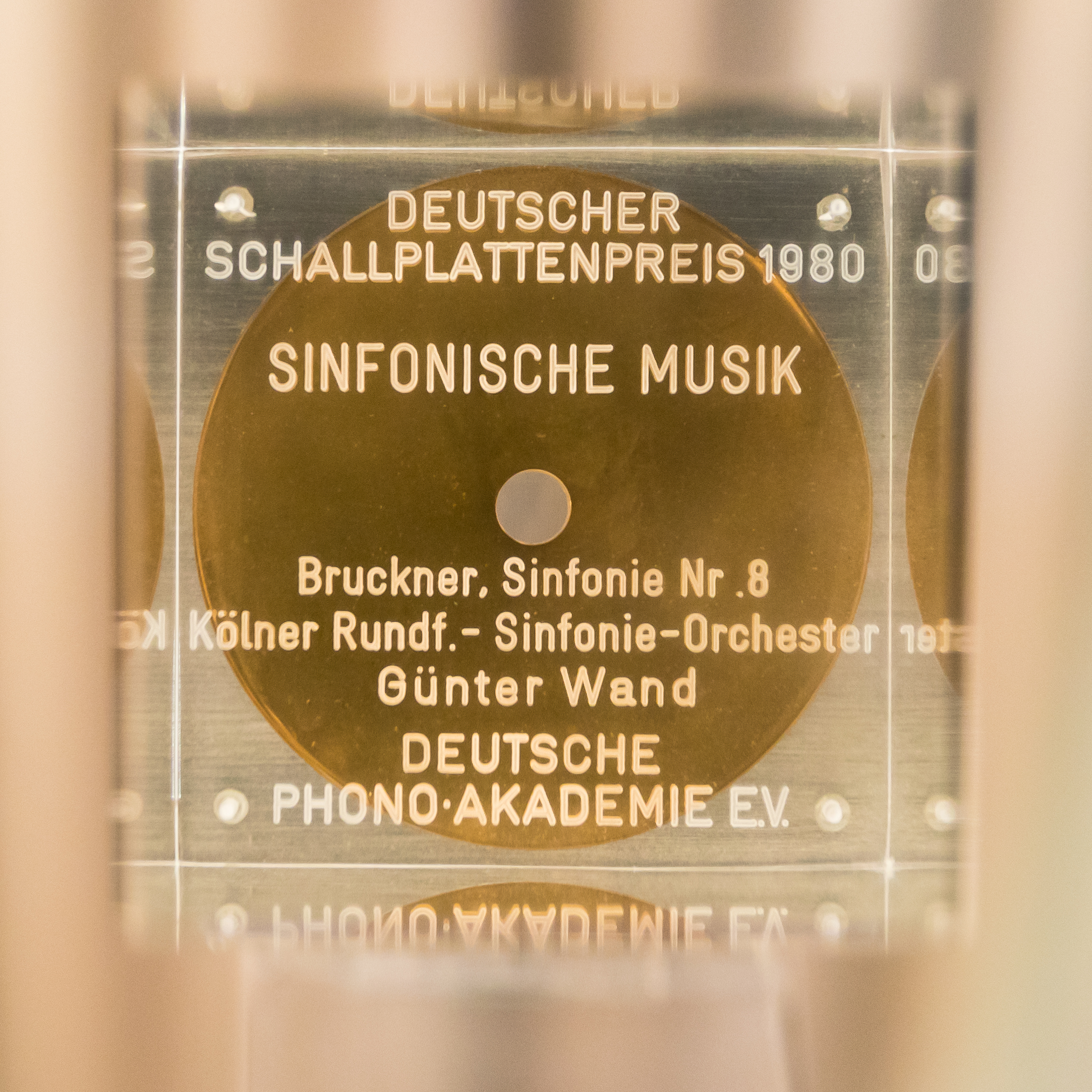
Deutscher Schallplattenpreis 1980

The Deutscher Schallplattenpreis was a prize that the Deutsche Phono-Akademie awarded from 1963 through 1992. Its successor is the Echo Music Prize.
