= Trio (Trio album) =

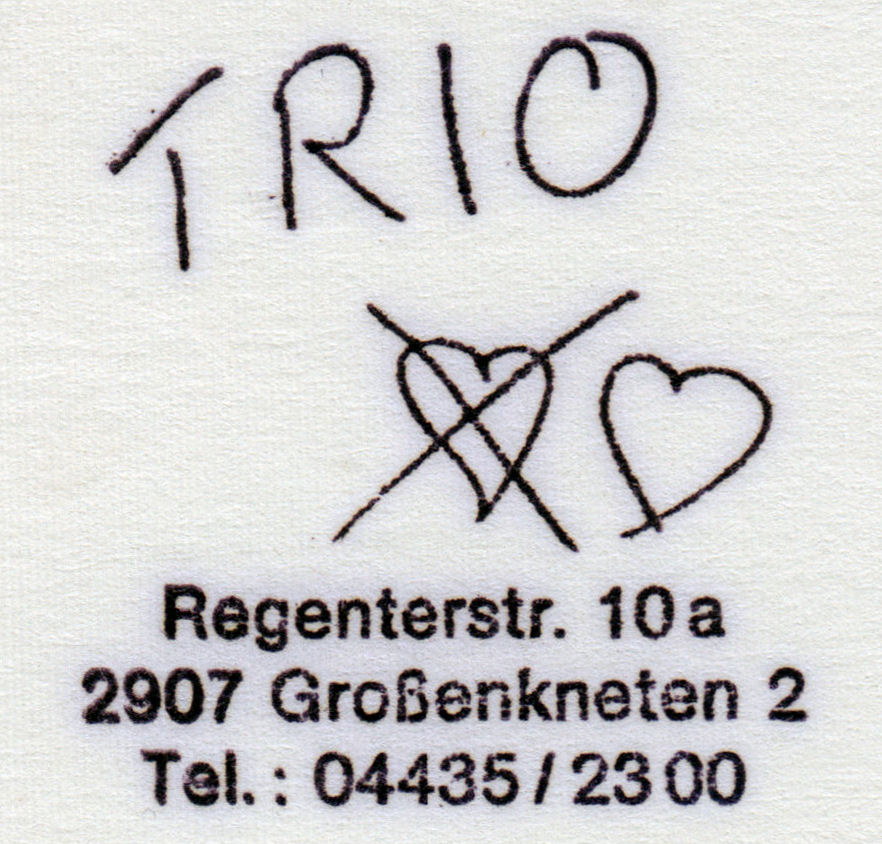
- Original album cover (1981)

Studio album by Trio
- Released: October 27, 1981
- Recorded: Summer 1981
- Studios: Schweinestall-Studio, Husum, Germany
- Genres: Neue Deutsche Welle, minimal wave, garage punk
- Label: Mercury
- Producer: Klaus Voormann

Trio chronology
Trio (1981)	TRIO Live im Frühjahr '82 (1982)

Trio is the debut studio album from the German band of the same name. It was released on 27 October 1981, by Mercury Records. It included a bonus single and has a handle attached to the cover.

The commercial success of the album only started in 1982 with the release of the third version, which included the song Da Da Da, this being previously available on a separate single before. After April 1982, as part of the Neue Deutsche Welle the song became a national and then an international hit. The album reached #3 on the German charts. The album Trio contains 14 songs in all, most of them with drums, electric guitar and vocals. The majority of songs describe failed relationships and occasionally include media criticism.

== Background ==
In the 1960s, singer Stephan Remmler and guitarist Kralle Krawinkel had played together in the northern German beat music band Just Us. After their breakup in 1970 and unsuccessful attempts at becoming solo artists, Remmler and Krawinkel became qualified teachers. Following a one-time reunion of Just Us in January 1979, they decided to give producing commercially successful music a second chance, writing the first songs for a potential album at Krawinkel's farm in Rastede, Lower Saxony. At that stage, the group still recorded songs such as Nasty or Energie in a classic rock style, using guitars, bass, drums, keyboards and vocals. Remmler and Krawinkel worked with a number of different background musicians, among them the then unemployed drummer Peter Behrens. Commenting on Trio's eventual decision to continue making music as a three-piece band, which saw Behrens permanently join the other two, Stephan Remmler said:

We normally jammed with the prospective new band members for the entire weekend, then Peter started to come during the week as well. We worked as a trio, then at the weekend two other new members joined and when we compared the samples we realised that our material as a trio was a lot closer to what we actually wanted.

Remmler, Krawinkel, and Behrens rented a house in Regente, Sage, for 600 marks, and developed the songs that would become the album Trio in the practice room in the cellar. Almost all the lyrics were written by Remmler, who took inspiration from everyday life in the shared house. In 2008 Krawinkel described the idea behind the lyrics to the song "Los Paul" ("Go for it, Paul"), which came to him when he and Behrens were watching a football match together:

At that time Paul was on the German National team. Stephen came in and I said, "You haven't a clue about football! Get out!" "No no, I'd like to watch too!" He had a notebook with him. Then I said, "Go for it Paul, you gotta kick him in the balls!" He wrote down what I said, had a quick look and quickly closed the notebook. The commentator said, "Two men are catching up on him". Stephan wrote that down too; the next day it was in the song. That was our life. A pretty good life.

The band, now named Trio, recorded a selection of these songs on a TEAC four-track reel-to-reel in their own rehearsal room. They recorded two tracks (Lady-O-Lady and Sunday You Need Love Monday Be Alone), as well as an almost 9-minute live version of the song Broken Hearts for You and Me onto a 10" mini LP. Hoping to secure a record deal, the band then submitted these tracks to several record companies but received 23 rejections. The song "Sunday You Need Love Monday Be Alone" caught the attention of an employee of the music publisher Francis, Day & Hunter, who then shared the demo with Louis Spillmann, the A&R Manager of the German record label Phonogram, who then attended a Trio concert. Convinced by the band's live performance, Spillmann offered the band a record deal that same evening.

Klaus Voormann, an intimate friend of the Beatles and former Bassist for John Lennon, was at this time an advisor for Spillmann. He went to a concert and a band rehearsal in Großenkneten. He encouraged Spillmann's decision to take the band under contract, not only because of their professional stage presence, but especially because of their role distribution in the band which corresponded well to their characters. From then on, Spillmann employed Voormann as the producer of Trio and they signed their first record contract.

== Production ==
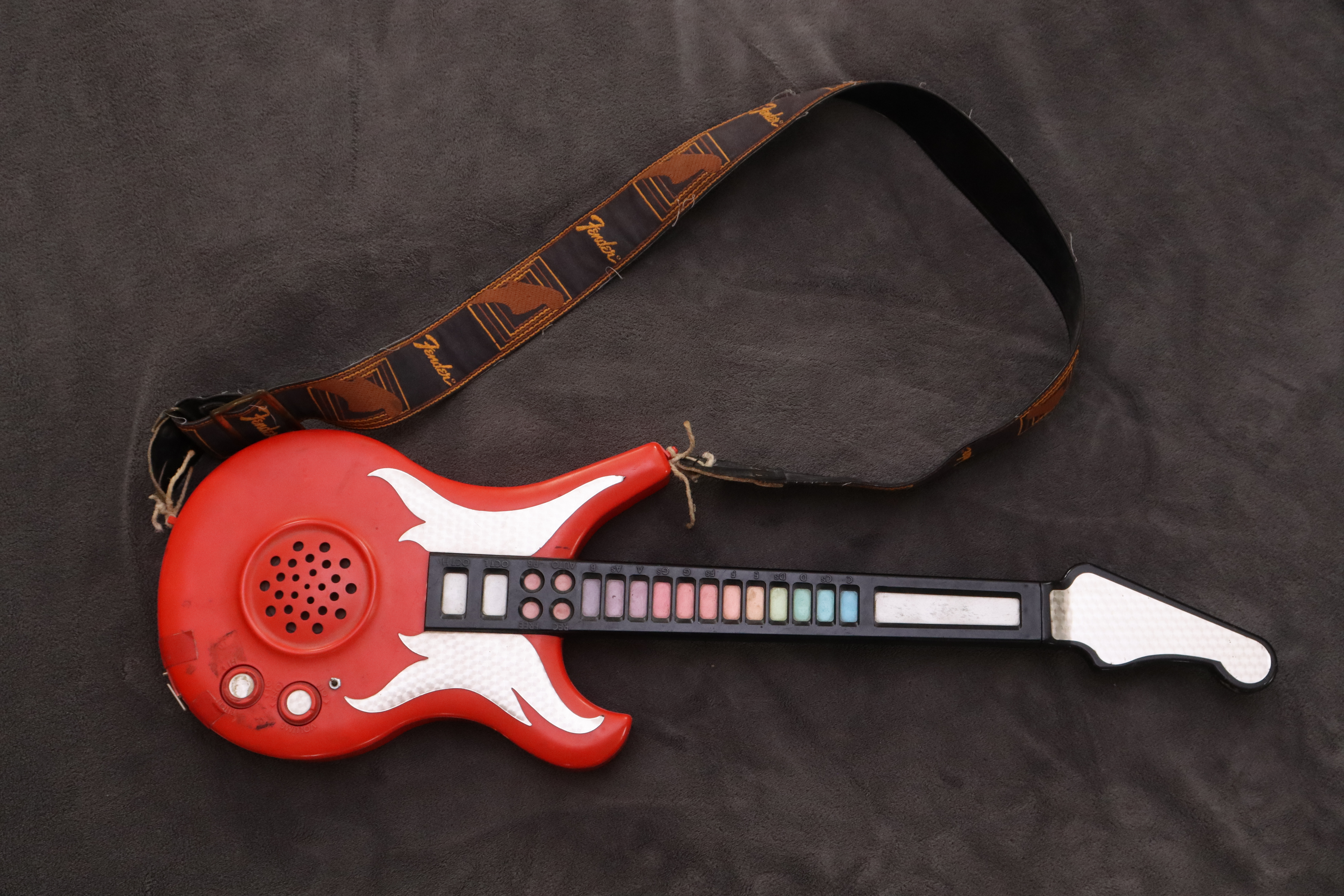
Remmler played a solo on this toy instrument during the song "Kummer"

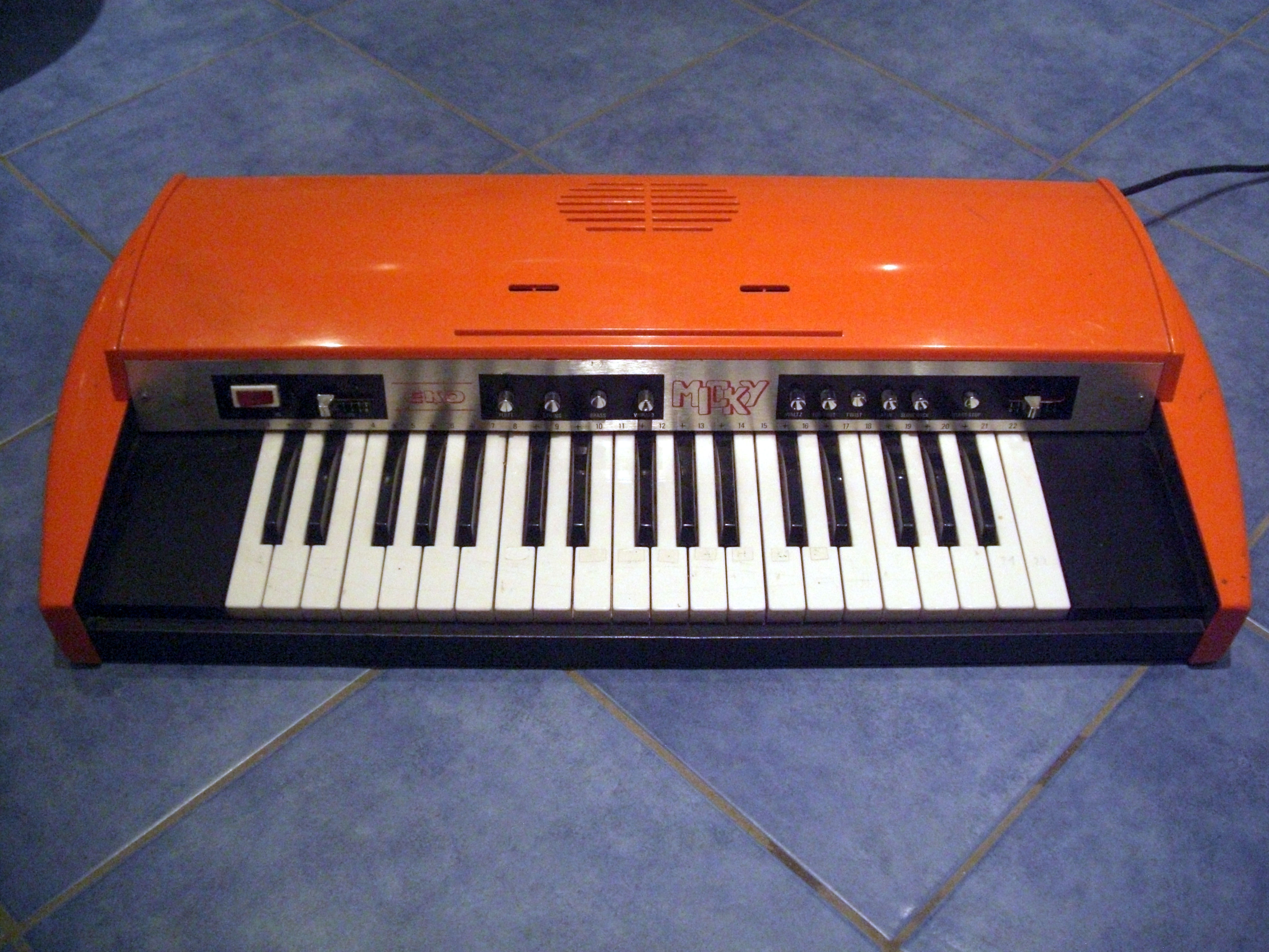
This "EKO Micky" keyboard served as sync pulse generator in the song "Energie"

In the summer of 1981, Voorman requested 10,000 German marks from Spillman in order to buy two eight-track recorders for production of Trio's debut album. They chose "Schweinestall-Studio" near Husum as the recording studio. It was run by Detlef Petersen, producer and former keyboard player of the German-English band Lake, together with Geoffrey Peacey. The latter worked as a sound technician on the album.

The drums and electric guitar were recorded live for every song by Krawinkel and Behrens and Remmler's vocals were dubbed over afterwards. Because of the songs' minimal instrumentation, there was little that needed changing during the recording. The band mastered their songs through lots of practice and many performances, resulting in a rapid succession of recordings. Occasionally the perfectionism of Stefan Remmler caused problems when he sent his band members and Klaus Voormann outside so that he could concentrate more on his singing.

Some of the songs included instrumental passages that were kept short in the recording studio but extended during live performances. One example was the long solo on a child's guitar that comes at the end of "Kummer" ("Worrying"). Onstage this became a true cacophony, but in the studio this was shortened with fadeout. A long guitar solo in "Broken Hearts for You and Me" was completely removed. Other tracks, however, were fine-tuned with small additions. In "Nasty" the guitar solo is introduced by a tinkling sound that was created in the studio using a cardboard box that was full of broken glass and thrown around the studio. The intro to "Danger Is" always ended live with the band rhythmically calling "Da Gefahr!" ("Watch out!"). However, in the studio version they didn't want the calls to be heard simultaneously with the rhythm. In order to achieve this off-beat effect the band threw balls to each other, and when someone threw the ball they had to shout "Watch out!"

In addition to the thirteen songs recorded at the studio, the album Trio features two older live recordings (Ja ja ja and TRIO), as well as the original demo version of the song Sabine Sabine Sabine.

The album was mixed by Voormann, where exactly is unknown. The completed version was presented to the record company Phonogram and caused arguments. Klaus Voormann remembers how Thomas Quast was desperately waiting for the E-bases to be added:

He probably believed, it would be a huge hit. He almost tore strips off me.

In the end, Louis Spillmann put his foot down and Klaus Voormann's mix was accepted. The album Trio was released by Phonogram's sublabel Mercury Records on Tuesday, 27 October 1981.

Trio's German tour followed the release of their album, and the band used the minimal effort of live performances for promotional purposes by performing live at local record stores in the afternoons. By the end of 1981, Trio had played in a total of 39 record stores, starting with "Montanus" in Berlin and ending in "Studio 2000" in Homburg. When performing in a Müller drug store in Bad Tölz, Trio were kicked out for being too loud. They also performed several short concerts in record sections of department stores like Hertie or Karstadt. Their two-hour live show was only performed in the evenings in local clubs.

Some of Trio's other live songs such as "Oder doch – Wird so schlimm nicht sein", were not included on the album due to the suggestive nature of their lyrics:

Open up your legs and let me in

it's not going to harm you
Take it in your mouth up to your throat
it's not going to harm you
or is it?

Also the songs "Du ich wär so gern bei dir" (Oh, I'd love to be with you), "A little love", "Country Boy" and "Nirgendwohin" (Going Nowhere) from the bands' live performances were not included on the album. Whether or not the aforementioned songs were actually produced is unknown, as the original recordings from the sessions are missing. In 1985 a revised version of the song "Oder doch - Wird so schlimm nicht sein" under the name "Ready for you" was included on the bands' final studio album, Whats the Password. "Du ich wär so gern bei dir" was also rerecorded and released as Anna – Lassmichrein Lassmichraus at the end of 1982. In 1993 Stephan Remmler produced the song once again in its original form and featured it on his solo album Vamos.

== Da Da Da ==
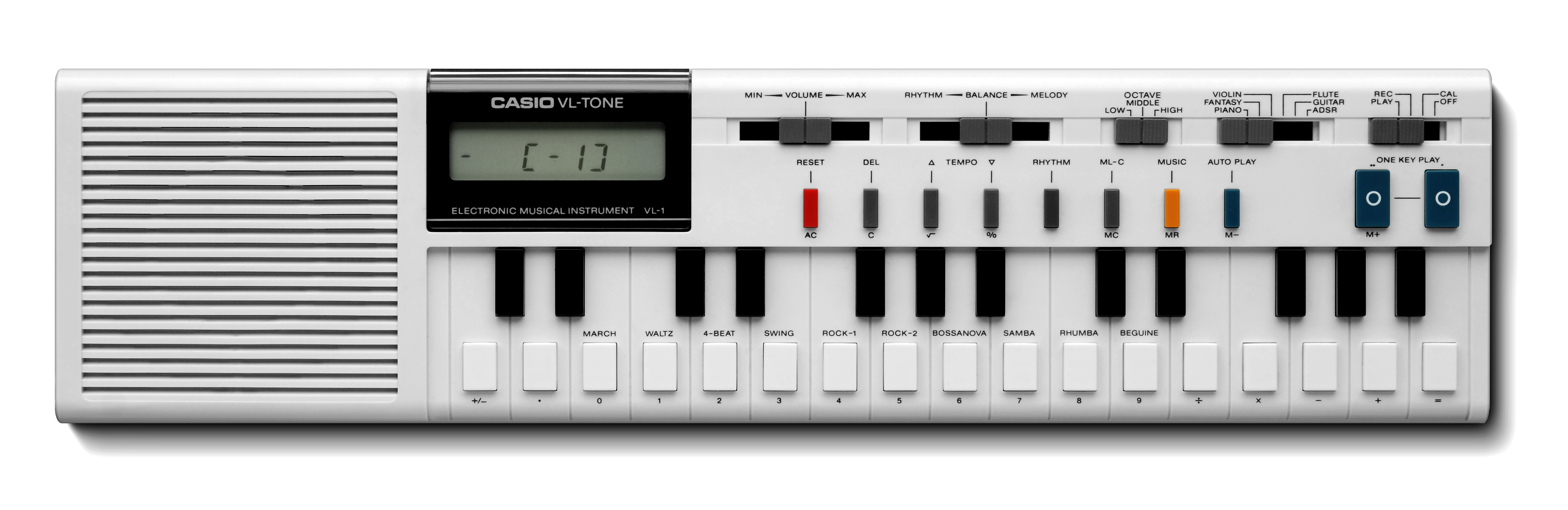
The sound of Da Da Da was influenced by the toy keyboard Casio VL-1.

The band wrote the song Da Da Da in the course of their 1981 Germany tour and the audience loved it. In 2003, Rolling Stone editor Joachim Hentschel attributed Trio's success directly to the composition of their song Da Da Da:

Da Da Da, unpopular with both the experts and the musicians themselves, could be seen as the ultimate Trio moment, a three and a half minute trip through the band's weird universe. It was the first song the group composed after the initial exciting months and the establishment of their image. The first song where they were fully aware of their abilities.

— Joachim Hentschel, Linernotes zum Album "Trio Deluxe Edition". (deutsch und englisch). Universal Music 2003.

Early in 1982 Klaus Voormann decided to release Da Da Da as a single. In the Zürich studio of their fellow band Yello, Trio recorded the music and vocals of the song. Then, in a studio in Berlin Annette Humpe and Joachim Behrendt, both members of the band Ideal, added backing vocals and castanets. A single and a maxi single of Da Da Da were released in February 1982. Gaining popularity through multiple television appearances, including Bananas and the ZDF-Hitparade, Da Da Da entered the German charts on 5 April 1982 and ultimately peaked at number two.

On the back of this success, Da Da Da was later added to the third edition of the album Trio as the second song on the B-side.

== Album cover design ==
In line with their musically minimal concept, the cover of the album Trio was also kept as simple as possible. The white background cover is mainly covered with black items.

The band name, the logo and their private address and telephone number were printed in black on a white background. The image is an enlarged print of an address stamp of the band, containing a misspelled street name (the correct street name being "Regenter Str."). On the back of the album there is a list of the songs handwritten by Remmler himself. Information regarding the music, the identity of the musicians or the production teams is not included on the cover.

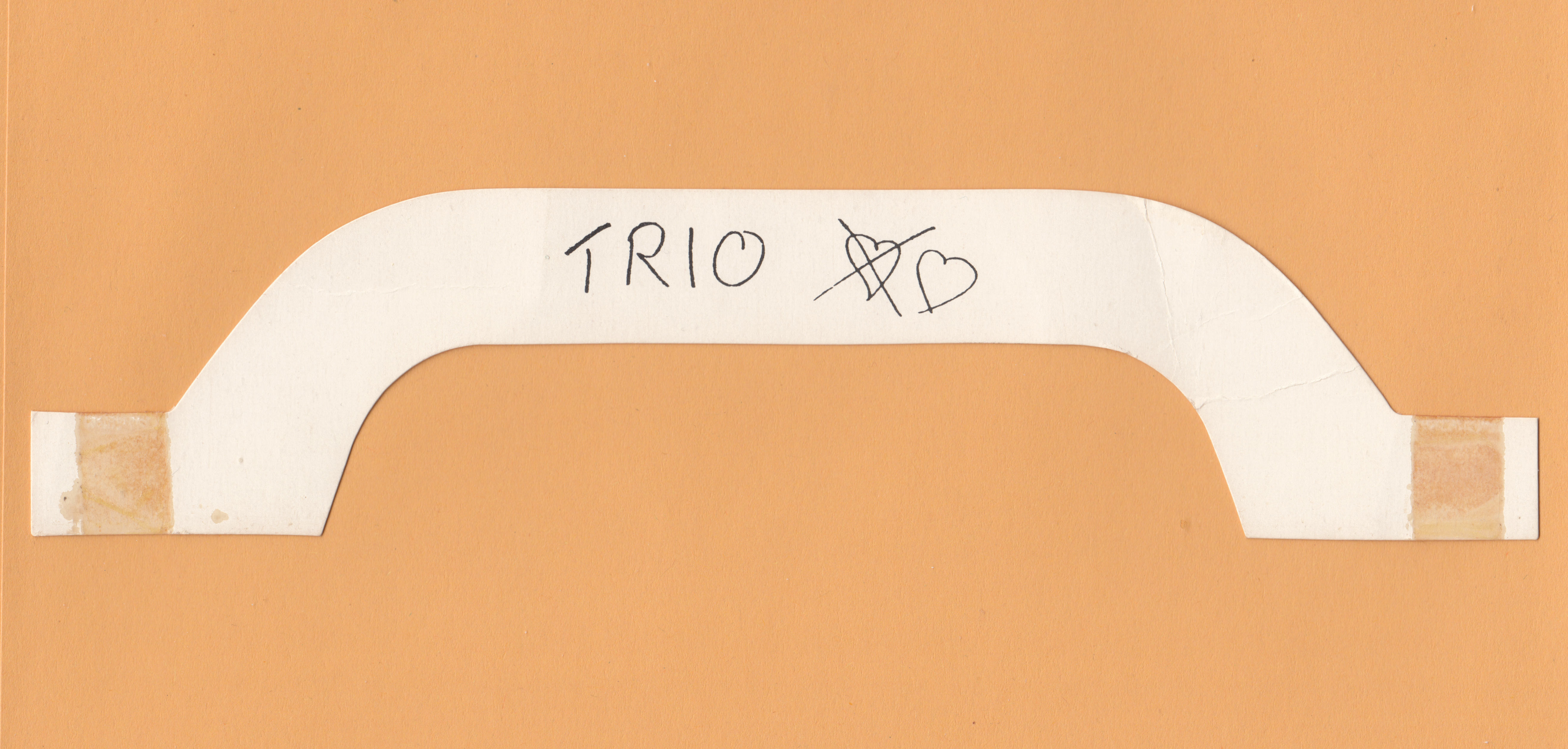
The handle which is attached on the album.

The song lyrics are printed in black and white on the inner-sleeve of the vinyl. The cover layout has also been minimised with the lack of punctuation.

The names "Remmler" and "Kralle" as composers appear only on the label of the disc, along with "Klaus Voormann" as the producer. Behrens, who did not take part in the composing of the songs, was not mentioned by name anywhere on the record.

Prior to the release of the album, some employees at the record company Phonogram Inc. were worried that, at record stores, the white cover could collect dirt and discolor over time, but the design ultimately remained unchanged.

The first vinyl edition of the album contained a bonus single with the songs Halt mich fest ich werd verrückt and Lady-O-Lady and was limited to 6000 copies. On the top edge of the record cover there was a handle made out of paper.

The CD version, which was released in 1984, largely maintained the plain cover. Only the track list, originally handwritten, was replaced by print. In contrast to the vinyl edition, names of authors and producers were left out completely on the CD. The information on the CD version contained: band name, private home address, phone number, list of tracks and lyrics. In 2003, Universal Music released a Deluxe Edition 2CD version in Europe, containing the original album remastered (with "Da da da ich lieb..." added and "Los Paul" moved down in the track list), single tracks, demos and the debut 10" EP.

Including their private phone number inevitably led to a large number of calls to their house in Großenkneten, which they most likely intended. For this reason, they installed an answering machine and regularly each band member recorded a new voice mail. Also, using their private home address led to countless visitors that made it almost impossible for them to focus on making music. In 1984, Remmler and Behrens moved out of their house in Großenkneten and finally in 1989 the last band member, Krawinkel, left.

== Musical description ==
=== Concept ===
Typical simple drumbeat which appears multiple times in songs on the album

Trio made it their goal to reduce diverse various music genres to an absolute minimum. Almost all of the songs on the album were solely played with drums and the electric guitar. On a couple of titles, (Energie, Ya Ya), a simplified model of the electric organ "EKO Micky" was used. The vocals were partly modified with the use of a throat microphone and a megaphone. On the album, you can hear among other things Reggae (Energie), love songs (Kummer, Sabine Sabine Sabine), punk (Ja Ja wo gehts lank Peter Pank schönen Dank), rock ’n’ roll (Ya Ya) as well as rock (Sunday You Need Love Monday Be Alone). Despite the clear distinction in styles of music, the album sound is consistent due to little instrumentation. The presentation of the songs works as a unifying link.

Some of the lyrics on the album Trio are in German, some in English and in a number of songs both languages are used. Almost all of the lyrics and half of the music were written by Remmler, the other half by Krawinkel. Behrens did not take part in any composition.

=== Musical style and lyrics ===
The album opens with the 30-second song "Achtung Achtung", which was made especially for this album and was not part of any of Trio's live performances. Accompanied by drums and a guitar solo, Remmler shouts through a megaphone: "Attention Attention! Don't be fooled! Although it looks like it is about your entertainment, in the end, it is about giving your sympathy and money to the Trio. Let's go."

The song ends abruptly, swiftly followed by Remmler shouting "Ja Ja Ja", which forms the introduction to the album's second title Ja Ja Ja. This hard rock song is the live recording of a 1981 performance in Stade. "Ja Ja Ja"' is a very fast song with a tempo of 220 beats per minute (bpm). Remmler sings the first two verses and choruses in German. Then, as the guitar stops playing, Remmler switches to English, accompanied only by the drums. Remmler's voice is further altered by the use of a throat microphone. Towards the end of the song, Remmler imitates the sounds of an anti-aircraft gun and a grenade.

Following the very quick and aggressive "Ja Ja Ja" is the extremely slow (around 80bpm) Kummer, which begins with church bells. After a few seconds the drums and electric guitar are added, whose key of E-major is not the same as the G-major of the bells and so a dissonance is created. After a few bars Remmler begins to sing in a very deep voice and the bells die away. In a few lines the song describes the pain of separation of the singer after a failed relationship. The song ends with the bells once more where the dissonance is amplified by a solo on a children's guitar.

The rock song "Broken Hearts for You and Me" begins with marching band music, which is played solely on a bass drum and snare. Remmler uses a mega-phone to invite listeners to a flash mob:

Women marched along the inner route, while men proceeded along the outer route in the opposite direction.

After around half a minute the tempo switches to a 4/4 beat, the guitar kicks in and Remmler sings in English about trying to end a relationship on good terms. While Krawinkel and Behrens continuously sing the chorus including the title of the track "Broken hearts for you and me"

In the song "Nasty" Remmler repeatedly insults his ex-girlfriend in English and shows that he, after the obvious break-up, can no longer understand that he ever got involved with her. The song does not have a refrain but rather begins with a strong, dissonant guitar solo after two verses, which is then followed by another verse. The end of the song rises to a crescendo, in which Remmler repeatedly sings "I can't go on with this feeling 'bout you" with rising pitch. In the outro of the song Remmler bursts into laughter.

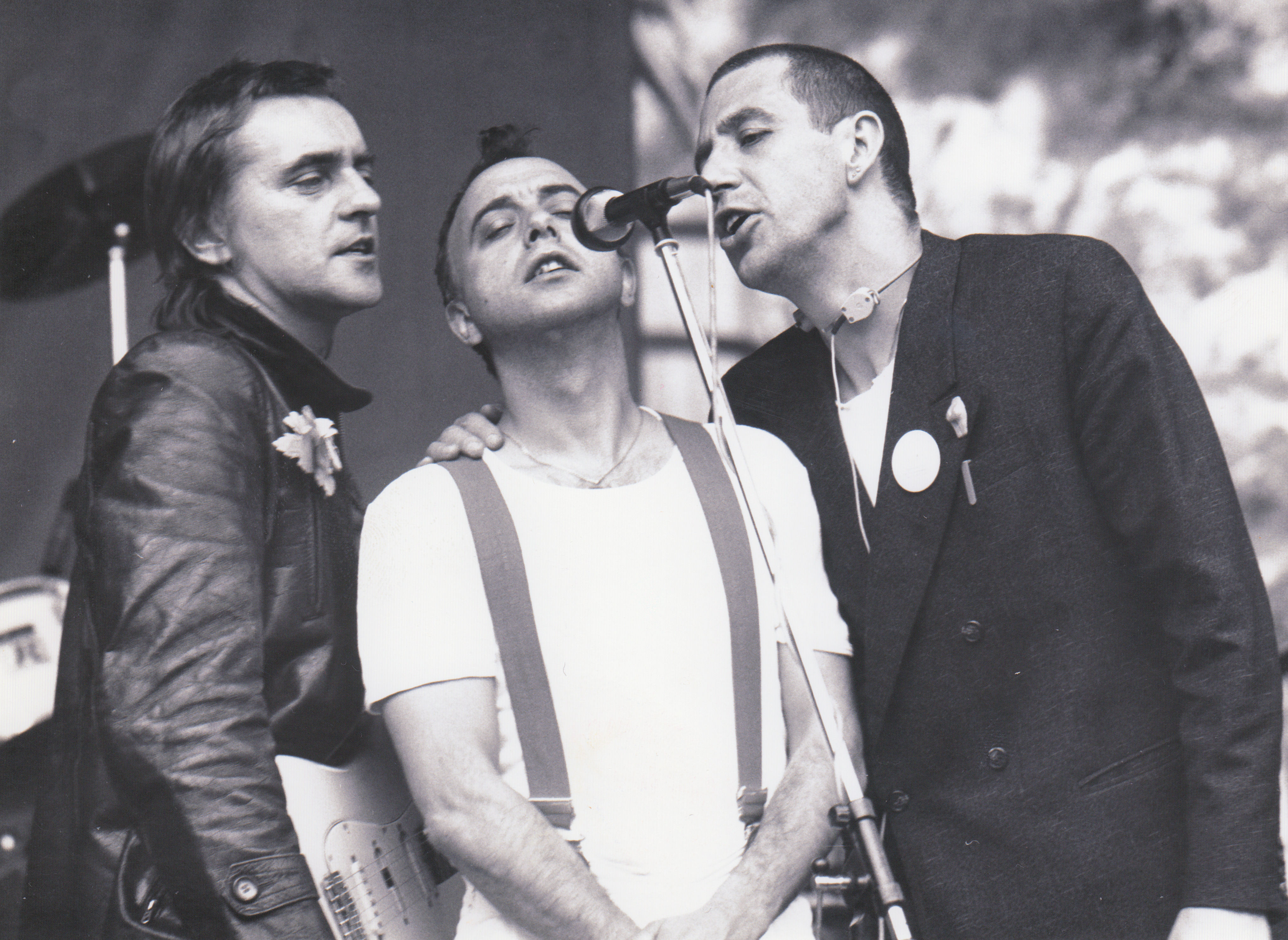
Trio 1982 (from left to right: Kralle Krawinkel, Peter Behrens, Stephan Remmler)

The electric organ contributes to the calypso rhythm of the song Energie instead of the drums. In the opening, there is the sound of waves and a strong guitar solo can be heard. The intro creates a tropical atmosphere and then Remmler speaks an introduction in German:

Brown guys play their handmade folklore instruments on the beach. Smooth bodies sway in the moonlight.

After the guitar solo and the sound of waves have ended, the lyrics continue in English with Remmler asking his girlfriend to lift his mood. First, he only sings to the rhythm of the electric organ, then later the guitar and choir join in. There are no drums in the recording. The song closes with finger clicking and the lines

Too nervous, too nervous,
give me energy
too nervous, too nervous,
oh woman rescue me.

The ending of the A-side of the album is the punk song "Los Paul", which begins with the striking line "Go Paul, you have to really hit him in the balls!". In the verses, Krawinkel plays a single repetitive chord on the electric guitar, accompanied by a quick beat from the drums. Remmler sings a couple of phrases which are taken from the commentary of a football match. After the second chorus, the vocals stop. In the left stereo channel, clips of a real football commentary can be heard, in which video replays are analysed. At the same time, in the right stereo channel, multiple news readers are reporting one after the other about the attack on Ronald Reagan.

The B-side begins with the song "Sabine Sabine Sabine". Since the song was produced by Trio in their rehearsal room and not in a studio, the sound is different than the rest of the album. The drums especially have a rather percussive tone. In addition to its shallow background music belonging to Easy Listening, the narrator is on the phone with his ex-girlfriend Sabine, whose answers cannot be heard. The narrator's uncertainty, caused by the course of conversation, is not expressed by choice of words but through intonation. Although his plan to meet with his ex-girlfriend fails, he pretends to be bored to hide his failure.

The ironic Schlager music "Da Da Da ich lieb dich nicht du liebst mich nicht aha aha aha" is partly spoken in German and English verses and accompanied by drums and a keyboard. The song describes the end of a romantic relationship, which is strongly pointed out by the constant repetition of the line "Ich lieb dich nicht du liebst mich nicht". With the refrain, which essentially consists of the three syllables "Da Da Da", electric guitars, a faint bass guitar as well as a female choir and castanets start playing.

The rock song "Sunday You Need Love Monday Be Alone" is about a relationship with a desired woman and it is clear from the start that this relationship will not last any longer than the weekend. Towards the end of the song, the speaker even asks the woman to not let him in because he would not treat her with enough respect.

The song "Nur ein Traum" describes a daydream (Tagtraum) twice - once in English and once in German. The "narrator" is travelling with his loved one in the car and is all over her. Then it becomes clear to him that he is actually sitting alone in the car and his loved one is only a dream.

Like the song "Ja Ja Ja", "Ja Ja Wo gehts lank Peter Pank schönen Dank" is an example of hard rock. To a very fast guitar riff and a drum lick consisting of only the bass drum and snare, Remmler sings a series of unrelated phrases in German including Trio's telephone number. The songs ends abruptly without fading out.

The only "cover version" on the album is "Ya Ya", a Rhythm and Blues hit by Lee Dorsey in 1961. The short text was sung by Remmler - unlike the original - in a particularly monotonous manner. The solo after the second verse consists of four chromatic notes played on an electronic home organ.

"Danger Is" begins with a dissonant guitar riff that ends abruptly with the introduction of the vocals. In terms of content, the song is about a looming unknown danger. After each verse line, Krawinkel plays a short riff on the electric guitar. After two verses the riff from the intro reappears with even more dissonance, in addition to a blaring siren.

The album ends with a short extract from one of Trio's concerts, that includes a text-edited short version of the Jamaican folk song "Banana Boat Song" which was a hit for Harry Belafonte. Instead of the final chant "Day-O" of the original, Behrens shouts: "Tri-o" to which the audience responds "Tri-i-i-o".

=== Reviews ===
Professional ratings
Review scores
Source	Rating
AllMusic	3/5 stars

Few reviews of Trio were published upon its initial release, as the album did not become popular until months later. Journalist Detlef Kinsler of the specialist music magazine Sounds wrote that the album "can't be placed in the German music scene" and found that he could not assign it a formal rating, instead giving his score as a range: two to five points out of a possible five. Reviewing the album in 1981, the German magazine Musikexpress said: "The music is a bit all over the place, in a similar style to that of The Cramps. It has an almost garage band sound, evoking an original Rock'n'Roll feel." The magazine's review suggested that Trio showed influences from the Sex Pistols, Elvis Presley, Otto Waalkes, Torfrock and Status Quo. Writing in Musikexpress in 1982, Bernd Gockel described the album's lyrical style:

When it comes to the lyrics, there is more than it seems at first. The cliches and words that Stefan Remmler picks up from everyday life don't follow logical rules but behind that there is a sense of reality, that the listener isn't consciously aware of. What it aims to get across is everyday banality.

It was not until years after its release that Trio received more critical praise. In 2001, Musikexpress listed it as one of the three most significant albums recorded by a German band. In his review of the album, author Christoph Lindemann stated: "Trio reminded me of punk, of Schlager music but at the same time, it sounded like everyone's first attempt at singing when they were young. The Pling-Pling and Bang-Bang of their music was frequently accompanied by totally meaningless texts. Until then no band had ever produced pop music quite like they did."

=== Charts ===
Despite unconventional advertising such as concerts in record stores, initially not enough albums were sold for a place in the charts. At the end of November 1981 the Norddeutscher Rundfunk broadcast a radio concert which Trio gave in the Onkel Pö club in Hamburg and at the end of February 1982 the Westdeutscher Rundfunk broadcast a TV concert which Trio gave during the Rockpalast TV show. However, the success that the single Da Da Da brought led to the album Trio reaching number 3 in the German album charts, while Da Da Da reached number 2 in the singles charts. Although the album sold over 250,000 copies, this did not lead to it receiving gold certification because the sales figures for the different editions were not added together. Outside of German-speaking countries the album only reached in the Swedish charts. The single Da Da Da was an international hit and sold 13 million copies worldwide with 3 million sold in Europe alone.

=== Cover versions ===
Apart from numerous covers of the worldwide hit Da Da Da, other songs of the album were covered by different artists. The American bands The Jesus Lizard and Oblivians both released a version of Sunday You Need Love Monday Be Alone. The latter also released a single version of the song, which contains Ja ja ja on its B-side. The single cover is inspired by the original American cover of the album Trio. In 1997, the German band Samba released the single Kummer. The German hip hop group Die Fantastischen Vier rearranged samples of the songs Ja ja wo gehts lank Peter Pank schönen Dank and Ja ja ja to make up their song Böse in 1991. The song was released on their debut album Jetzt geht’s ab. Various Northern German amateur bands covered almost all the songs from Trio, which then appeared on a tribute album named Krach Bum Bäng Zack Döner in 2004.

== Track listing ==
All songs written by Stephan Remmler and Kralle Krawinkel, except where noted.

Original German release
No.	Title	Writer(s)	Length
1.	"Achtung Achtung"		0:30
2.	"Ja Ja Ja"		2:57
3.	"Kummer"		2:38
4.	"Broken hearts for you and me"		3:33
5.	"Nasty"		2:38
6.	"Energie"		3:30
7.	"Los Paul"		2:32
8.	"Sabine Sabine Sabine"		3:46
9.	"Da da da ich lieb dich nicht du liebst mich nicht aha aha aha" (Added to the third German edition LP in 1982.)		3:23
10.	"Sunday you need love Monday be alone"		3:48
11.	"Nur ein Traum"		3:04
12.	"Ja Ja wo gehts lank Peter Pank schönen Dank"		2:50
13.	"Ya Ya"	Lee Dorsey, Clarence Lewis, Morgan Robinson	2:15
14.	"Danger is"		2:14
15.	"TRIO"	Harry Belafonte, Irving Burgie, William Attaway	0:31

International release
No.	Title	Writer(s)	Length
1.	"Achtung Achtung"		0:30
2.	"Ja Ja Ja"		2:57
3.	"Kummer"		2:38
4.	"Broken hearts for you and me"		3:33
5.	"Nasty"		2:38
6.	"Energie"		3:30
7.	"Los Paul"		2:32
8.	"Da Da Da I don't love you you don't love me aha aha aha"		3:23
9.	"Ya Ya"	Dorsey, Lewis, Robinson	2:15
10.	"Ja Ja wo gehts lank Peter Pank schönen Dank"		2:50
11.	"Sunday you need love Monday be alone"		3:48
12.	"Halt mich fest ich werd verrückt"		2:02
13.	"Sabine Sabine Sabine"		3:46
14.	"TRIO"	Belafonte, Burgie, Attaway	0:31

2003 Deluxe Edition

CD1
No.	Title	Writer(s)	Length
1.	"Achtung Achtung"		0:30
2.	"Ja Ja Ja"		2:57
3.	"Kummer"		2:38
4.	"Broken hearts for you and me"		3:33
5.	"Nasty"		2:38
6.	"Energie"		3:30
7.	"Sabine Sabine Sabine"		3:46
8.	"Da da da ich lieb dich nicht du liebst mich nicht aha aha aha"		3:23
9.	"Sunday you need love Monday be alone"		3:48
10.	"Nur ein Traum"		3:04
11.	"Ja Ja wo gehts lank Peter Pank schönen Dank"		2:50
12.	"Ya Ya"	Dorsey, Lewis, Robinson	2:15
13.	"Los Paul"		2:32
14.	"Danger is"		2:14
15.	"TRIO"	Belafonte, Burgie, Attaway	0:31
16.	"Lady-O-Lady"		2:53
17.	"Halt mich fest ich werd verrückt"		2:02
18.	"Da Da Da I don't love you you don't love me aha aha aha"		3:26
19.	"Da da da ich lieb dich nicht du liebst mich nicht aha aha aha" (Extended Version)		6:32

CD2
No.	Title	Writer(s)	Length
1.	"Los Paul"		1:56
2.	"Ja Ja wo gehts lank Peter Pank schönen Dank"		2:41
3.	"Broken hearts for you and me"		2:50
4.	"Du, ich wär so gern bei dir"		3:09
5.	"Danger is"		2:32
6.	"Sabine Sabine Sabine"		3:47
7.	"Energie"		3:11
8.	"Ya Ya"	Dorsey, Lewis, Robinson	2:26
9.	"Kummer" (Live)		5:58
10.	"Lady-O-Lady" (1980 10" Vinyl EP Version)		4:13
11.	"Sunday you need love Monday be alone" (1980 10" Vinyl EP Version)		4:19
12.	"Broken hearts for you and me" (Live)		8:47

On CD2, tracks 1–8 are previously unreleased demos.

== Personnel ==
Trio

- Stephan Remmler – vocals, keyboards
- Kralle Krawinkel – guitar, backing vocals
- Peter Behrens – drums, backing vocals

Technical

- Klaus Voormann – producer
- Geoffrey Peacey – engineer
