= Mother's Meat and Freud's Flesh =

- Directed by: Demetrios Estdelacropolis
- Written by: Demetrios Estdelacropolis
- Produced by: Louise Burns
- Starring: Demetrios Estdelacropolis; Esther Vargas
- Cinematography: Jason Levy
- Edited by: Louise Burns; André Guimond; Jean Lebeux
- Music by: Stephan Remmler; Gert Krawinkel; Peter Behrens
- Release date: February 23, 1984 (Berlin)
- Running time: 93 minutes
- Country: Canada
- Language: English

Mother's Meat and Freud's Flesh is a Canadian comedy-drama cult film, released in 1984. The directorial debut of underground filmmaker Demetrios Estdelacropolis, it was made while he was a film student at Concordia University.

== Plot ==
Inspired by the early trash films of John Waters, the film stars Estdelacropolis as Demira, a gay porn actor struggling with both his emotionally complicated relationship with his mother Esther (Esther Vargas) and his desire to break out of porn and into mainstream movies. He connects with a Freudian psychiatrist who is convinced that his homosexuality stems from an unresolved Oedipus complex which he has repressed by denying his natural attractions to women, to which the psychiatrist's proposed solution is to hypnotize Esther into believing that she is a man so that men will become the gender that sexually repulses Demira; in his career, he is ambivalent when the first "mainstream" role he is able to land is a gore film in which he will play the victim of a cannibal family for which Esther has also been cast as the mother.

== Cast ==
- George Agettees as Flaky Porno Director
- Pierre Bastien as Gay Basher
- Christian Dufault as N.Y. boy friend
- Demetri Estdelacropolis (credited as Demetri Demetrios) as Dimira / Lucie
- Michel Gagnon as Psycho / Dentist
- Lawrence Joseph as Hollywood Movie Producer
- Harry Karagopian as Harry
- W.A. MacGregor as Couch Prop
- Marjorie Morton as Woman with Pliers
- Claire Nadon as Porno actress
- E.J. Sullivan as Speed
- Michelle Tardif as Gore Twin Girl
- Rick Trembles as Gore Twin Boy
- Esther Vargas as Esther

== Production ==
Estdelacropolis wrote the film as a star vehicle for Vargas, with the goal of turning her into the new Edith Massey. He had first met Vargas in the lobby of a YWCA in Montreal, and was so taken with her eccentric personality that he later recorded 48 hours of her stream of consciousness monologues on random topics.

The film's production was officially credited to the National Film Board and the Canada Council, although both organizations denied actual involvement. Estdelacropolis had used NFB resources on his own time to complete the film while interning with the organization on another unrelated project, and the Canada Council was credited because the film was funded partly by the unspent portion of a grant he had previously received from the organization for a never-completed documentary film on the education of deaf students.

The film's soundtrack was composed by the German new wave synthpop band Trio.

== Release ==
The film debuted at the 1984 Berlin International Film Festival and subsequently screened at other film festivals, but faced difficulty in obtaining general market release due to its graphic content.

For the 1984 Festival of Festivals, it was given a one-time clearance by the Ontario Board of Censors, with the note that it would have to be resubmitted for another review if it received any further theatrical releases in the province.

== Reception ==
The film received mixed reviews from critics. Jay Scott wrote in The Globe and Mail that parts of the film were "hilarious" while other parts betrayed a "mindnumbing repetitiveness", while Variety savaged it as "offensive to virtually every minority and majority group in society." Writing for Cinema Canada, conversely, Gary Evans wrote that "The Freudian angle about mother-son relationships and homosexuality is such a parody of contemporary wisdoms that only the most hypersensitive (or Estdelacropolis' real mother) would feel threatened."

The film was screened at the 1985 Sundance Film Festival, where one audience member so disliked the film that he personally presented Estdelacropolis with a llama fetus as a "prize". In later interviews for the promotion of his 1999 film Shirley Pimple, Estdelacropolis claimed that Joel Coen had offered to give his Best Picture award for Blood Simple to Estdelacropolis in exchange for the fetus.
