= Da Da Da =

"Da Da Da I Don't Love You You Don't Love Me Aha Aha Aha"
- Original German cover art

Single by Trio

from the album Trio
- B-side: "Sabine Sabine Sabine"
- Released: 3 February 1982
- Recorded: 1981
- Studio: Schweinestall-Studio, Husum, Germany
- Genre: New wave; synth-pop; Eurodisco; novelty; electronic
- Length: 3:23
- Label: Mercury
- Songwriters: Stephan Remmler; Gert "Kralle" Krawinkel
- Producer: Klaus Voormann

Trio singles chronology
"Halt mich fest ich werd verrückt" (1981)	"Da Da Da I Don't Love You You Don't Love Me Aha Aha Aha" (1982)	"Anna – lassmichrein lassmichraus" (1982)

Audio sample
- "Da Da Da": file; help

"Da Da Da I Don't Love You You Don't Love Me Aha Aha Aha" (Note: German: "Da Da Da ich lieb dich nicht du liebst mich nicht aha aha aha") (usually shortened to "Da Da Da") is a song by the German band Trio. Trio was formed in 1980 by Stephan Remmler, Gert "Kralle" Krawinkel and Peter Behrens. Released as a single in 1982 and featured on their 1981 debut album Trio, "Da Da Da" became a hit in Germany and about 30 other countries, selling 13 million copies worldwide. The lyrics were written by Remmler, the music by Krawinkel. "Da Da Da" remains the band's biggest German hit and their only hit outside Germany.

== Background ==
"Da Da Da" became a hit and was a product of the Neue Deutsche Welle, the German New Wave.

== Charts ==
- The song was a chart success in more than 30 countries.
- The German version of "Da Da Da" reached No. 2 on the charts (April 1982). There were three versions: the single version (3:23), a long version (6:36). The live version was included in the album Trio live im Frühjahr 82 (1:32). The B-side of the 7-inch single release was "Sabine Sabine Sabine", whereas the B-side of the maxi-single carried two more songs: "Halt mich fest ich werd verrückt" and "Lady-O-Lady".
- In the UK, "Da Da Da" hit No. 2 in July 1982.
- In Canada, it peaked at No. 3 in December 1982.
- In France, the song was made more popular in 1982 with Zam making a French version titled "Da Da Da je t'aime pas tu m'aimes pas".
- In the US, the song peaked at No. 33 on the Dance/Disco Top 80 chart. In 1997, the song gained further chart success when the CD of TRIO and Error was released as Da Da Da I Don't Love You You Don't Love Me Aha Aha Aha in the United States, and was a US-only promo CD-single in response to the 1997 US Volkswagen Golf commercial that featured the song, often contracted to simply "Da Da Da". The re-release had some changes: two songs were added to the CD and the album was digitally remastered. The shorter version known as a radio edit runs for 2:49.

=== Weekly charts ===
Chart (1982)	Peak position
Argentina (CAPIF)	3
Australia (Kent Music Report)	4
Austria (Ö3 Austria Top 40)	1
Belgium (Ultratop 50 Flanders)	4
Canada Top Singles (RPM)	3
Denmark (IFPI)	2
Finland (Suomen virallinen lista)	2
France (IFOP)	3
Iceland (Dagblaðið Vísir)	3
Ireland (IRMA)	2
Israel	2
Italy (Musica e dischi)	5
Netherlands (Dutch Top 40)	7
Netherlands (Single Top 100)	11
New Zealand (Recorded Music NZ)	1
Norway (VG-lista)	2
Portugal (AFP)	4
South Africa (Springbok Radio)	1
Spain (AFYVE)	7
Sweden (Sverigetopplistan)	2
Switzerland (Schweizer Hitparade)	1
UK Singles (Official Charts)	2
US Dance/Disco Top 80 (Billboard)	33
West Germany (GfK)	2

=== Year-end charts ===
Chart (1982)	Position
Australia (Kent Music Report)	28
Austria (Ö3 Austria Top 40)	9
Belgium (Ultratop 50 Flanders)	7
Canada Top Singles (RPM)	25
New Zealand (RIANZ)	2
South Africa (Springbok Radio)	6
Switzerland (Schweizer Hitparade)	3

== Sales and certifications ==
Region	Certification	Certified units/sales
Canada (Music Canada)	2× Platinum	200,000^{^}
Germany (BVMI)	Gold	500,000^{^}
United Kingdom (BPI)	Silver	250,000^{^}
^{^} Shipments figures based on certification alone.

== Cover versions ==
- In 1982, German singer and actor Frank Zander released a cover of the song titled "Da da da ich weiß Bescheid, du weißt Bescheid" that also reached number two on the West German chart. The same year, an Italian version made by I Masters (a trio formed by three Italian young men, Paolo Paltrinieri, Lorenzo Canovi and Romeo Corpetti) called Da Da Da Mundial '82 was made after Italy's victory at the 1982 FIFA World Cup, with the lyrics honouring the Italian team, with the part prior to the refrain, before the "Aha" saying Son tutti figli di Bearzot (translated, They are all sons of Bearzot).
- Since 2008, a variation of "Da Da Da" has been used by the Austrian retail chain INTERSPAR for its television and radio presence. The song has also been incorporated into the retail chain’s slogan ("Alles da da da", lit. '"Everything's there there there"').
- In early 2019, YouTuber MaximillianMus created a parody titled, "Oh Yeah Yeah", and ordered his fanbase to take over YouTube comment sections, title-dropping the song across many videos on the platform, prompting YouTuber/rapper KSI to address the meme in one of his videos.
- In 2019, German metal band Hämatom covered the song, featuring Alexander Wesselsky from Eisbrecher.
- British rock group Elastica released a cover version on their second album, The Menace (2000).

== See also ==
- Dada
- Lists of number-one singles (Austria)
- List of number-one singles from the 1980s (New Zealand)
- List of number-one singles of the 1980s (Switzerland)
