= Frank Zander =

German singer and actor (born 1942)

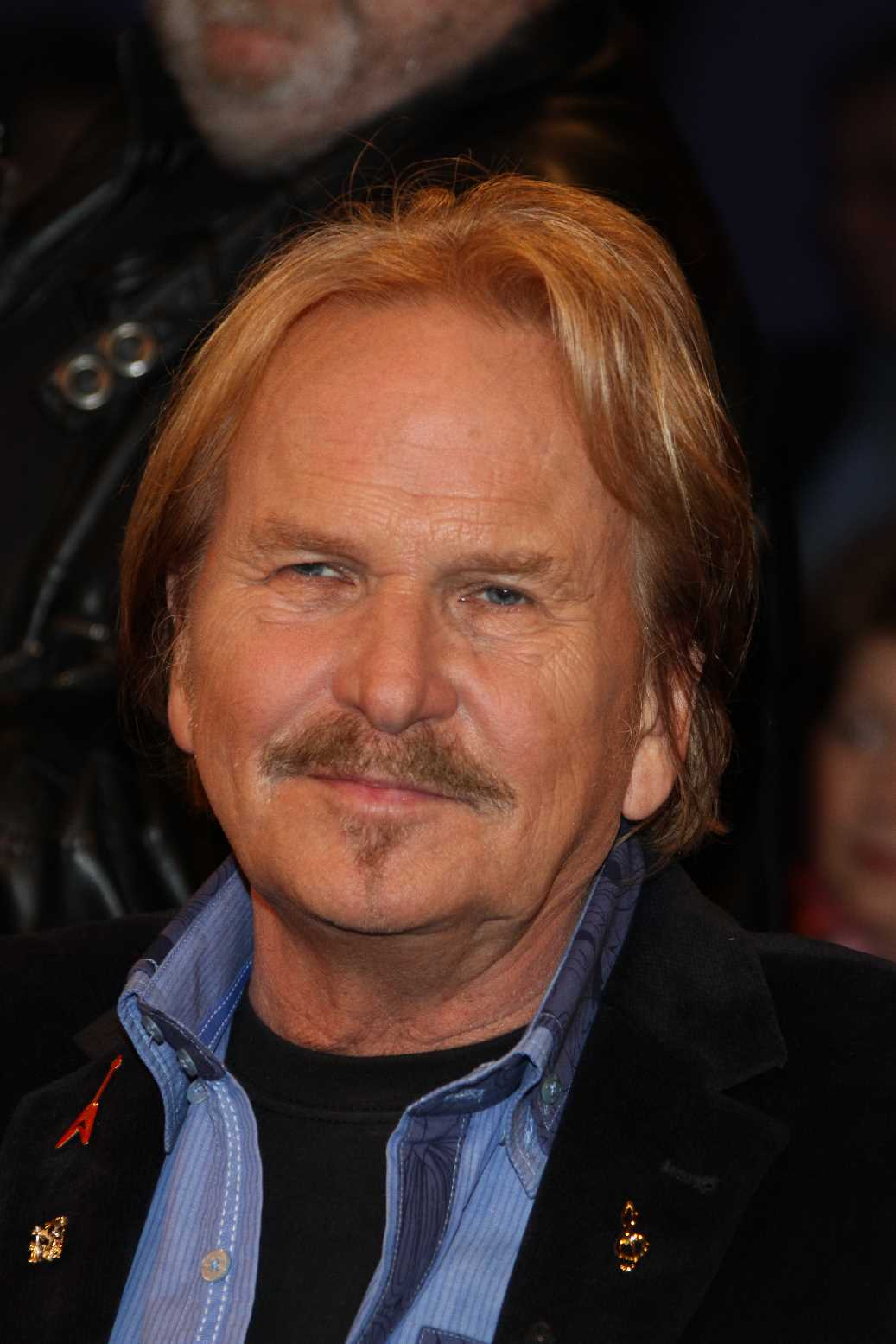
Frank Zander, 2009

Frank Kurt Zander (born 4 February 1942, Berlin) is a German singer and actor.

== Life ==
Zander works in Germany as singer and actor. Zander lives in Berlin-Charlottenburg and in Ibiza.

A fan of the German football club Hertha BSC, Zander wrote the club's current anthem "Nur Nach Hause", to the melody of The Sutherland Brothers' "Sailing". The song is performed by supporters as the team enters the field at every Hertha home game in the Olympiastadion in Berlin. His version of the Trio song "Da Da Da" peaked at number 48 in Australia in 1982.

For many years Zander has supported charities that help the homeless. He has received a number of awards for this.

== Songs ==
- 1974: "Ich trink auf dein Wohl, Marie"
- 1975: "Der Ur-Ur-Enkel von Frankenstein"
- 1976: "Oh, Susi (der zensierte Song)"
- 1978: "Disco Planet (Wir beamen)"
- 1981: "Ja, wenn wir alle Englein wären" (Ententanz) under his Pseudonym "Fred Sonnenschein und seine Freunde"
- 1989: "Hier kommt Kurt"
- 1990: Teenage Mutant Hero Turtles title song (German dub)
- 2007: "Hier kommt Knut"

== Awards ==
- 2002: Order of Merit of the Federal Republic of Germany
