= Insisters =

German band

Insisters was a German Neue Deutsche Welle band in the early 1980s. Band members were, among others, Rosa Precht and Ilonka Breitmeier.

== Discography ==
Albums

- Moderne Zeiten (1981)

Singles

- "Moderne Zeiten" (1981)
- "Subkultur Reggae" (1981)
- "Helmut – Karo Ceh" (1982)
