= Peter Behrens (disambiguation) =

Peter Behrens (1868–1940) was a German architect and designer

Peter Behrens may also refer to:

- Peter Behrens (writer) (born 1954), Canadian-American screenwriter and novelist
- Peter Behrens (musician) (1947–2016), German musician and actor
