= Andre Handles Them All =

- Directed by: Peter Fratzscher
- Written by: Gerd Haenel; Josef Ebner
- Produced by: Herbert Rimbach; Barbara Moorse; Christoph Holch; Georg Föcking
- Starring: Franco Nero; Ingrid Steeger; Maja Maranow
- Cinematography: Bernd Heinl
- Edited by: Helga Borsche
- Music by: Kristian Schultze
- Production companies: Avista Film; Splendid Film; ZDF
- Distributed by: Filmverlag der Autoren
- Release date: 29 March 1985
- Running time: 97 minutes
- Country: West Germany
- Language: German

Andre Handles Them All (German: André schafft sie alle) is a 1985 West German comedy film directed by Peter Fratzscher, starring Franco Nero, Ingrid Steeger and Maja Maranow. It was shot in Vienna and West Berlin. The film's sets were designed by the art director Rainer Schaper.

== Partial cast ==
- Franco Nero as André
- Ingrid Steeger as Lisa Strauber
- Maja Maranow as Isabella
- Willeke van Ammelrooy as Charlie
- Dolores Schmidinger as Toni
- Elisabeth Gnaiger as Ursula
- Peter Behrens as Bruno
- Stephan Paryla as Floriot
- Reiner Anders as Poldi
- Eddy Steinblock as Robbie
- Sybille Kos as Molly

== Bibliography ==
- Enjott Schneider. Handbuch Filmmusik I. Musikdramaturgie im Neuen Deutschen Film. 2018.
