= Tage im Hotel =

1983 German film

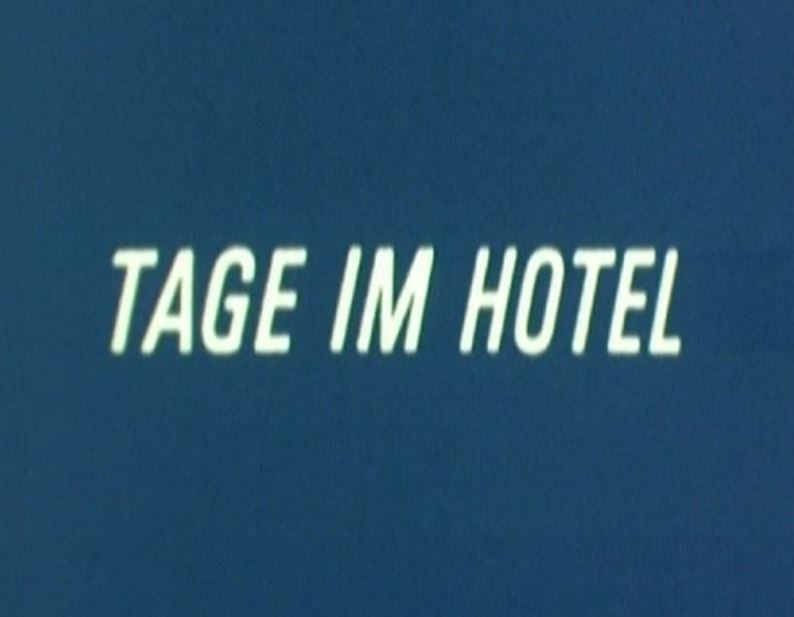
- Title card
- Directed by: Ulrich Stein
- Written by: Ulrich Stein
- Produced by: Ulrich Stein; Rüdiger Neumann
- Starring: Rolf Witt; Rebecca Pauly; Maja Maranow; Ferdinand Dux; Heinrich Giskes; Andrea Bürgin
- Cinematography: Rüdiger Neumann; Christoph Wenk
- Edited by: Ulrich Stein
- Release date: 20 February 1983
- Running time: 100 minutes
- Country: West Germany
- Language: German

Tage im Hotel is a German film directed by Ulrich Stein. It was released on February 20, 1983, during Berlin International Film Festival.

== Plot ==
After a three-year stay abroad in the United States, young Gernot returns to Germany with his girlfriend Kathy, whom he met during his time there. Not really knowing what to do in his home country, Gernot takes Kathy on a trip to Corsica. The couple rent a hotel room there. Gernot told Kathy that he would like to emigrate because he didn't really like it in Germany. His goal is to live in South America. A friend of his works in Nicaragua.

Other friends of Gernot are active in the film industry, including his homosexual friend Martin Palm and Sarah Lenhart. Gernot watches one of her films at the hotel in Corsica to kill time. In the film, the character played by Sarah shoots her boyfriend's best friend when she thinks he wants to approach her sexually.

After Gernot has spent a few days with his friends and then returns to Kathy, she tells him that their relationship is not working out and that she wants to return to the States. Shortly afterwards, Gernot says goodbye to Kathie, who has booked a ship passage. Unlike Kathy, Gernot remains undecided and continues to spend most of his time in his hotel room. He calls Sarah to meet her and spends some time talking about the world's problems with fellow hotel guest Christoph Liedloff.

With Sarah, Gernot kills time and after a while comes to the decision that he will probably go back to Germany because he needs money. Being a gifted cartoonist, he is considering selling his work, perhaps to get a grip on his financial problems.

== Cast ==
- Rolf Witt as Gernot
- Rebecca Pauly as Kathy
- Maja Maranow as Sarah Lenhart
- Ferdinand Dux as Christoph Liedloff
- Heinrich Giskes as Martin Palm
- Andrea Bürgin as Esther Kraus
