= Peter Fratzscher =

German television and film director

- Born: July 1, 1950 (age 76); Kassel, West Germany
- Occupations: Director, writer
- Years active: since 1972 (film & TV)

Peter Fratzscher (born 1950) is a German television and film director.

== Selected filmography ==
=== Film ===
- Panic Time (1980)
- Asphalt Night (1980)
- Andre Handles Them All (1985)
- Blutspur in den Osten (1995)
- Night Time (1998)
- Operation Guardian Angel (2009, TV film)

=== Television series ===
- Auf Achse (1986, 4 episodes)
- Ein Fall für zwei (1994–2010, 7 episodes)
- Kriminaltango (1995–1996, 11 episodes)
- Tatort (1997–2011, 11 episodes)

== Bibliography ==
- Tom Zwaenepoel. Dem guten Wahrheitsfinder auf der Spur: das populäre Krimigenre in der Literatur und im ZDF-Fernsehen. Königshausen & Neumann, 2004.
