= Maja Maranow =

German actress (1961–2016)

- Born: 20 March 1961; Nienburg, Lower Saxony, West Germany
- Died: 4 January 2016 (aged 54); Berlin, Germany
- Occupation: Actress
- Years active: 1982-2016

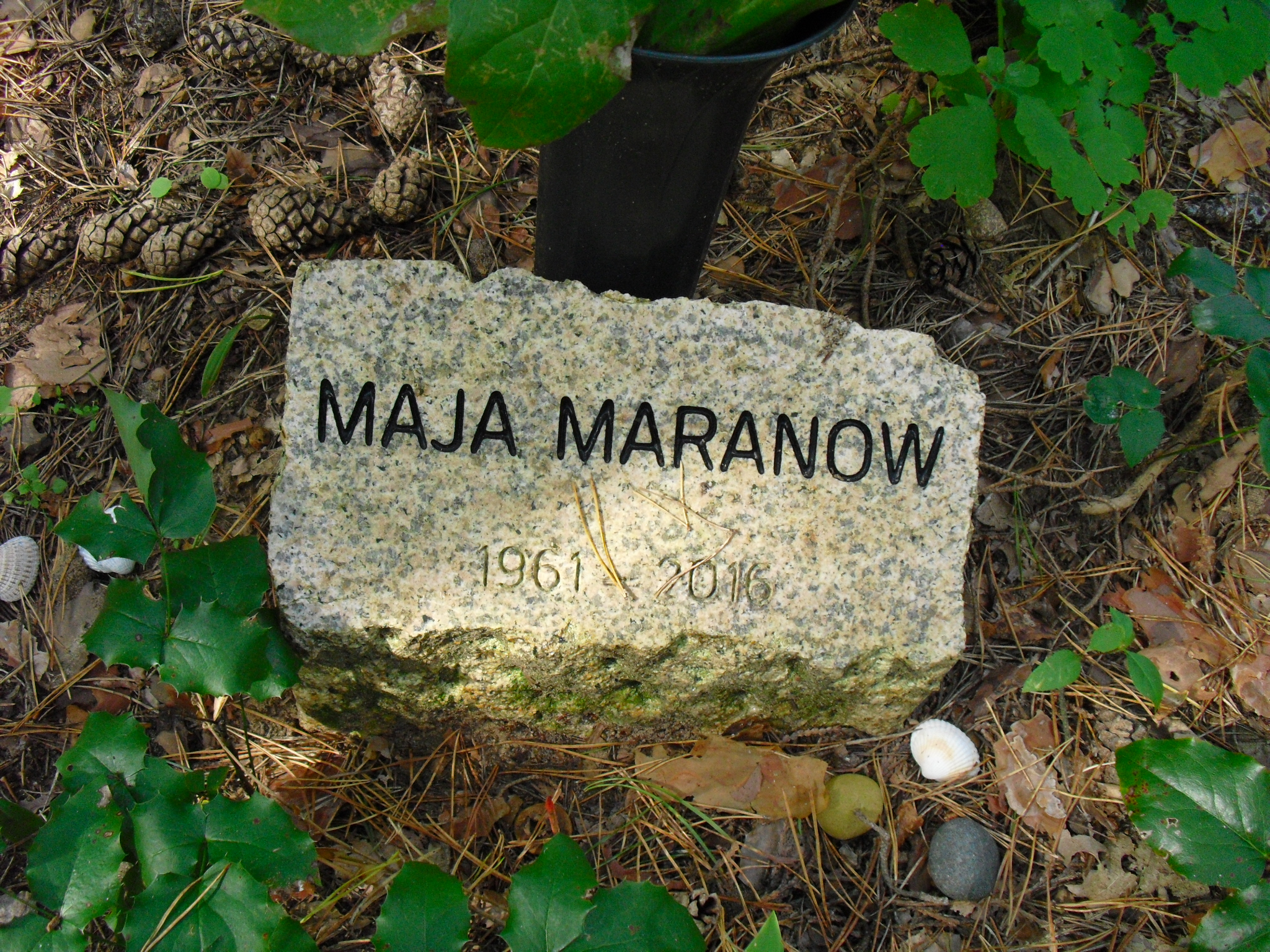
Maranow's grave in Stahnsdorf South-Western Cemetery

Maja Maranow (20 March 1961 – 4 January 2016) was a German actress. She appeared in more than 60 films and television shows between 1983 and 2016.

On January 4, 2016, Maranow died of breast cancer in Berlin, aged 54.

== Selected filmography ==
- Tage im Hotel (1983)
- Andre Handles Them All (1985)
- Die Insel (1987, TV series, 6 episodes)
- Rivalen der Rennbahn (1989, TV series, 11 episodes)
- Der neue Mann (1990, TV film)
- Ex & Hopp (1991, TV film)
- Jolly Joker (1991, TV series, 21 episodes)
- Private Crimes (1993, TV miniseries, 3 episodes)
- Ein starkes Team (1994–2016, TV series, 63 episodes)
- Man in Search of Woman (1994, TV film)
- Die Unbestechliche (1998, TV series, 8 episodes)
- Späte Rache (2001, TV film)
- Liebe Schwester (2002, TV film)
- Die Affäre Semmeling (2002, TV miniseries, 6 episodes)
- Beloved Sisters (2014)
