= Trio (band) =

German synthpop band (1979–1986)

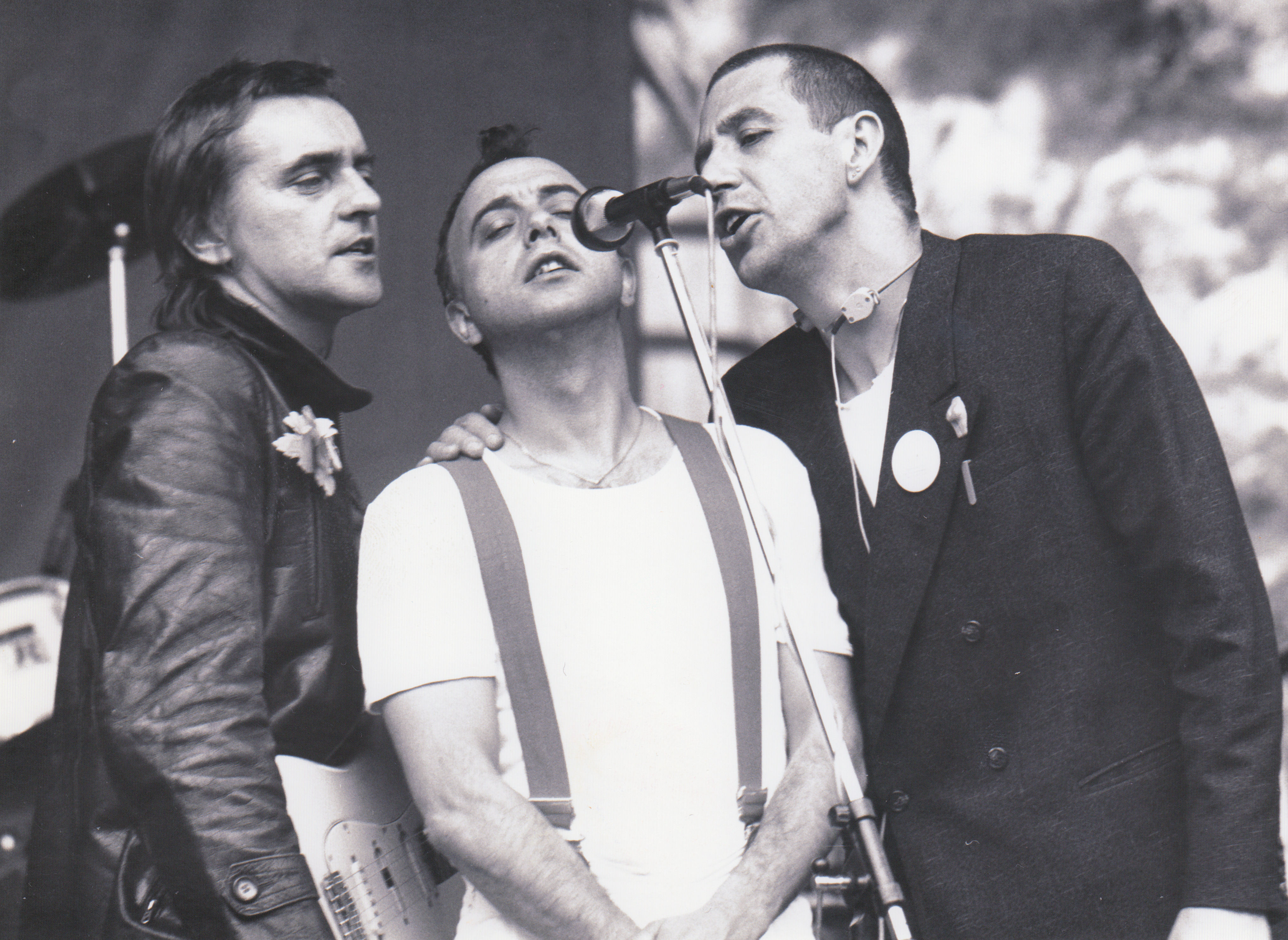
- Trio in 1982. L-R: Kralle Krawinkel, Peter Behrens, Stephan Remmler

Background information
- Origin: Großenkneten, Lower Saxony, West Germany
- Genres: Neue Deutsche Welle; new wave; minimalism
- Years active: 1979–1986
- Label: Mercury
- Past members: Stephan Remmler; Kralle Krawinkel; Peter Behrens

Trio was a German band formed in the municipality of Großenkneten in 1979. The band is most known for the 1982 song "Da Da Da", which was a hit in 30 countries worldwide.

== History ==
Trio consisted of Stephan Remmler (b. 1946), lead vocals and keyboards; Gert "Kralle" Krawinkel (1947–2014), guitar and backing vocals; and Peter Behrens (1947–2016), drums and backing vocals.

The band was originally called Zam although they were better known in Europe as Trio from 1980 to 1986. The band recorded a number of albums, the first of which was TRIO, produced by Klaus Voormann and released in 1981. This album included their signature song, "Da Da Da", the full English title of which is "Da Da Da (I Don't Love You, You Don't Love Me, Aha Aha Aha)". The next album was Bye Bye, released in 1983. Bye Bye was marketed with many different covers; for example, copies in North America were called TRIO and Error and featured no artwork.

While Trio was active, in the early 1980s, the group enjoyed some popularity in Germany, UK, Canada, and the United States. The German version of "Da Da Da" was a #2 hit on the charts (April 1982). Their most notable songs, in addition to "Da Da Da", are "Broken Hearts for You and Me", "Boom Boom", "Hearts Are Trump" and "Anna – Letmein Letmeout". All of these songs, except the first, have a corresponding German version, which sometimes differs considerably in lyrics, and were also released in the English-speaking world. "Da Da Da" hit #2 on the UK Singles Chart in July 1982, and #3 in Canada in December 1982. They had another three top ten hits in Germany until the end of 1983, then disbanded the following year. Every member launched a solo career, with only Remmler managing to be somewhat successful.

They produced a film called Drei gegen Drei, meaning "Three Against Three". In the movie, three people (played by Trio members) kill doubles of themselves as part of a twisted scam to gain riches. The film was a flop; even avid Trio fan Matthias Klein noted that, "[the members of] Trio are not actors". The corresponding soundtrack is the album Whats the Password; however, drummer Peter Behrens did not perform on any of the songs, despite appearing on the album's cover. He left the band due to disagreement with Krawinkel and Remmler over financial matters, leading to the complete break-up of Trio in 1986.

The 1997 CD re-issue of TRIO and Error was also released as Da Da Da in the United States, in response to the U.S. Volkswagen commercial that featured their most famous song. The re-release had some changes: two songs were added and the album was digitally remastered.

Krawinkel died in 2014 and Behrens died in 2016, making Remmler the sole living former member.

=== "Da Da Da" in popular culture ===
Many cover versions of "Da Da Da" have been recorded worldwide in various languages including the Spanish version by disc jockey Nacho Dogan, which was a No. 2 hit in Spain in 1982; a Mexican version by the band Molotov on their 2004 cover album Con Todo Respeto; alternative band Elastica on their 1999 album The Menace; and Filipino entertainer Yoyoy Villame in 1982. Pett Productions used "Da Da Da" in the second series of Tittybangbang for the intro to Pete Wade's sketches. An Italian version (Mundial Da Da Da) was also released in 1982 to celebrate the Italian Team's winning the FIFA World Cup.

In addition to the famous Volkswagen ad, several others have featured "Da Da Da". A Pepsi ad for the 2006 FIFA World Cup starred several footballers including Thierry Henry, Raúl, Roberto Carlos, Fernando Torres, Frank Lampard, Ronaldinho and David Beckham playing football inside of an Oktoberfest tent. Christina Aguilera sang the tune in several Pepsi spots, including duets with Rain and Elissa. Ariston used the song in their 1987 spots featuring animated white goods, clothing and kitchen utensils forming dancing humanoids. Some ads used modified lyrics. Teletext replaced "da da da" with "blah blah blah"; as did Lois Jeans. Others who have used the tune in advertisements include Vicks Cough Drops, and Speeds shoe stores.

Following the popular Volkswagen commercial, ABC aired a promo for the sitcom Spin City parodying the car ad. In the original VW commercial, two men drive around and pick up a smelly couch, which they quickly dispose of. In the ABC ad, Michael J. Fox and Michael Boatman's characters pick up Richard Kind's character, who becomes so obnoxious that they throw him out of the car.

The rice cracker brand Sakata also used the song in advertisements with the lyrics changed to "sa-ka-ta".

The song has been used in the Italian film Il Divo, directed by Paolo Sorrentino, a fictional biography of Italian politician Giulio Andreotti. The song was also included in the comedy film Bio-Dome, directed by Jason Bloom, starring Pauly Shore and Stephen Baldwin, and in the thriller Thick as Thieves, starring Alec Baldwin and Rebecca De Mornay.

== Musical style ==
Trio was part of the Neue Deutsche Welle (or NDW); however, the band preferred the name "Neue Deutsche Fröhlichkeit", which means "New German Cheerfulness", to describe their music.

Trio's main principle was to remove almost all the ornamentation and polish from their songs, and to use the simplest practical structures (most of their songs were three-chord songs). For this reason, many of their songs use only drums, guitar, vocals, and one or two other instruments at most. Bass was used very infrequently until their later songs, and live shows often saw Remmler playing some simple pre-programmed rhythms and melodies on his small Casio VL-1 keyboard while Behrens played his drums with one hand and ate an apple with the other.

== Personnel ==
- Stephan Remmler – lead vocals, keyboards
- Kralle Krawinkel – guitar, backing vocals
- Peter Behrens – drums, backing vocals

The band was produced by Klaus Voormann, who also played bass on a few songs.

== Discography ==
=== Albums ===
==== Studio ====
Year	Title	Details	Peak chart positions			
Year	Title	Details	AUT	GER	SWE	SWI
1981	Trio	Released: October 1981; Label: Mercury	16	3	40	—
1983	Bye Bye	Released: August 1983; Label: Mercury; Released with a different track listing in the US and Canada as Trio and Error	20	9	—	15
1985	Whats the Password	Released: September 1985; Label: Mercury	—	—	—	—
"—" denotes releases that did not chart or were not released

"Trio and Error" did not chart in the US and Canada, but "Herz ist Trumpf" (Hearts are Trump) made the top 50 on the Dance and Pop Charts in the US.

==== Live ====
- 1982: TRIO Live im Frühjahr '82 ("Live in Spring '82")

==== Compilations ====
- 1986: 5 Jahre zuviel (5 Years Too Many)
- 1997: Da Da Da (US only)
- 2000: Triologie (Best-of)
- 2003: Trio Deluxe Edition

=== Singles ===
Year	Single	Peak chart positions									
Year	Single	AUS	AUT	BE	FIN	GER	NL	NZ	SWI	UK	US Dance
1981	"Halt mich fest ich werd verrückt" ("Stop Me Before I Go Crazy") (Germany-only release)	—	—	—	—	—	—	—	—	—	—
1982	"Da Da Da ich lieb dich nicht du liebst mich nicht aha aha aha" ("Da Da Da I Don't Love You You Don't Love Me Aha Aha Aha")	4	1	4	2	2	11	1	1	2	33
1982	"Anna – Lassmichrein Lassmichraus" ("Anna – Letmein Letmeout")	—	16	—	7	3	—	—	—	133	—
1983	"Bum Bum" ("Boom Boom")	—	13	—	22	7	—	—	9	—	—
1983	"Herz ist Trumpf" ("Hearts Are Trump")	—	3	—	—	12	36	—	9	—	—
1983	"Turaluraluralu – Ich mach BuBu was machst du" ("Tooralooralooraloo – Is It Old & Is It New [Literally 'I make BuBu, what do you make?']")	—	8	31	—	6	30	—	4	—	—
1984	"Tutti Frutti"	—	—	—	—	75	—	19	—	—	—
1985	"Drei gegen drei" ("Three Against Three")	—	—	—	—	—	—	—	—	—	—
1985	"Ready for You"	—	—	—	—	—	—	—	—	—	—
1986	"My Sweet Angel"	—	—	—	—	—	—	—	—	—	—
1997	"Da Da Da I Don't Love You You Don't Love Me Aha Aha Aha" (US-only promo-single release)	—	—	—	—	—	—	—	—	—	—
"—" denotes releases that did not chart or were not released											
