= Peter Behrens (musician) =

German drummer and actor (1947–2016)

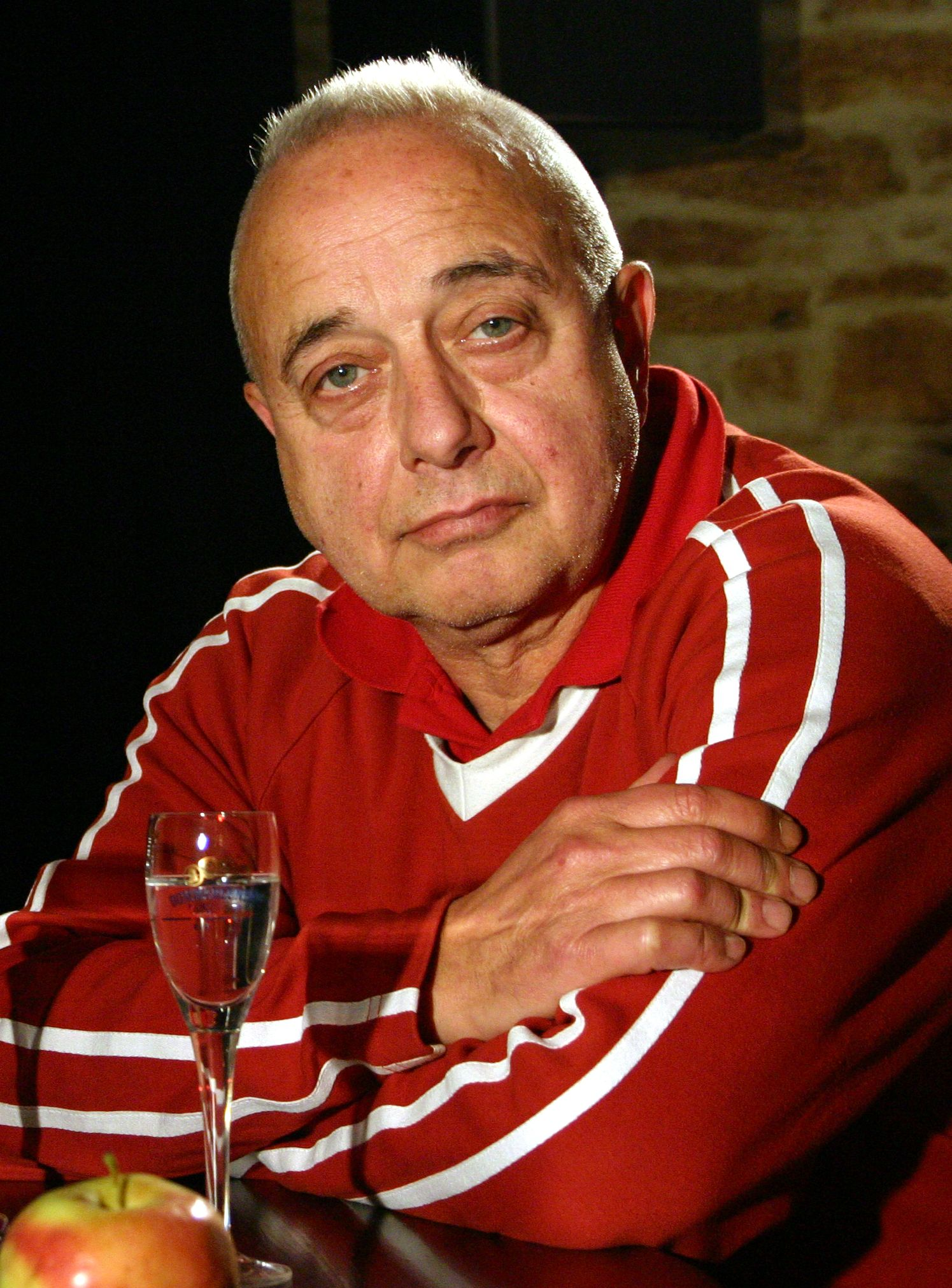

Background information
- Born: 4 September 1947; Sanderbusch, Lower Saxony, Germany
- Died: 11 May 2016 (aged 68) Wilhelmshaven, Lower Saxony, Germany
- Genres: New German Wave; Krautrock
- Occupations: Musician; actor; clown
- Instrument: Drums
- Formerly of: Silberbart; Trio

Peter Behrens (4 September 1947 – 11 May 2016) was a German musician and actor, best known as the drummer of the 1980s pop group Trio.

== Life ==
Peter Behrens was the illegitimate son of an American GI, and was put up for adoption by his biological mother. He was adopted by the Behrens family, where he grew up in northern Germany. After graduating from high school in Jaderberg, he studied at a college nearby, but quit a short while later.

Subsequently, he toured as a drummer in several bands, playing throughout northern Germany, and for half a year throughout Africa. In 1971 he played in the Krautrock band Silberbart, who released an album of psychedelic hard rock, now very popular among collectors. Nearing the end of the 1970s, he attended the Milan circus school, and worked briefly as a clown and pantomime artist.

Together with Stephan Remmler and Gert "Kralle" Krawinkel, Behrens was a member of the German band Trio in the early 1980s, where he played the drums. The band became known particularly through the minimalist title Da Da Da, as part of the New German Wave. The other two members met Behrens through a newspaper advertisement.

Behrens was known for his somewhat formal attire: white T-shirt, white pants, red suspenders/braces and red shoes (sometimes wore a dark blue jacket as a solo artist). His hairstyle incorporated an upward coil similar to that of Moritz of Max and Moritz. He adopted this appearance before clown school and Trio. He used to play the drums standing upright in a rigid manner with a stony expression, which contributed to the distinctive appearance of the band.

After Trio disbanded in 1986, and after overcoming alcoholism and a severe drug problem, he dedicated himself to his work as a social worker on the streets of Bremerhaven and Wilhelmshaven. As a solo artist, he was not successful. He interpreted songs, including the official song for the European Football Championship 1988, Das Tor, Dep De Dö Dep, a cover version of "Tom's Diner" by Suzanne Vega.

In the late 1980s, Peter Behrens appeared in a few films. In his first three of these (Andre Handles Them All, Drei gegen Drei and Thousand Eyes), he played even bigger roles. In Manta – Der Film, he played a minimal supporting role. In 2005 and 2006, he joined Frl. Menke performing in a musical in Hamburg. After this musical ended its run, he again played drums in a band. In 2008, under the name Peter Behrens (Ex-Trio) & Drei Mann im Doppelbett a song called "drei zwei", written by three Trio-fans, was published, for which a music video was produced. There is also a music video clip titled "Goldene Zeiten" (Golden Times) directed by Carsten Freckmann of the group Art & Weise from 2014 with Peter Behrens as a clown.

Behrens had two children and lived in Wilhelmshaven, where he died on 11 May 2016 from multiple organ failure. He was 68.

== Discography ==
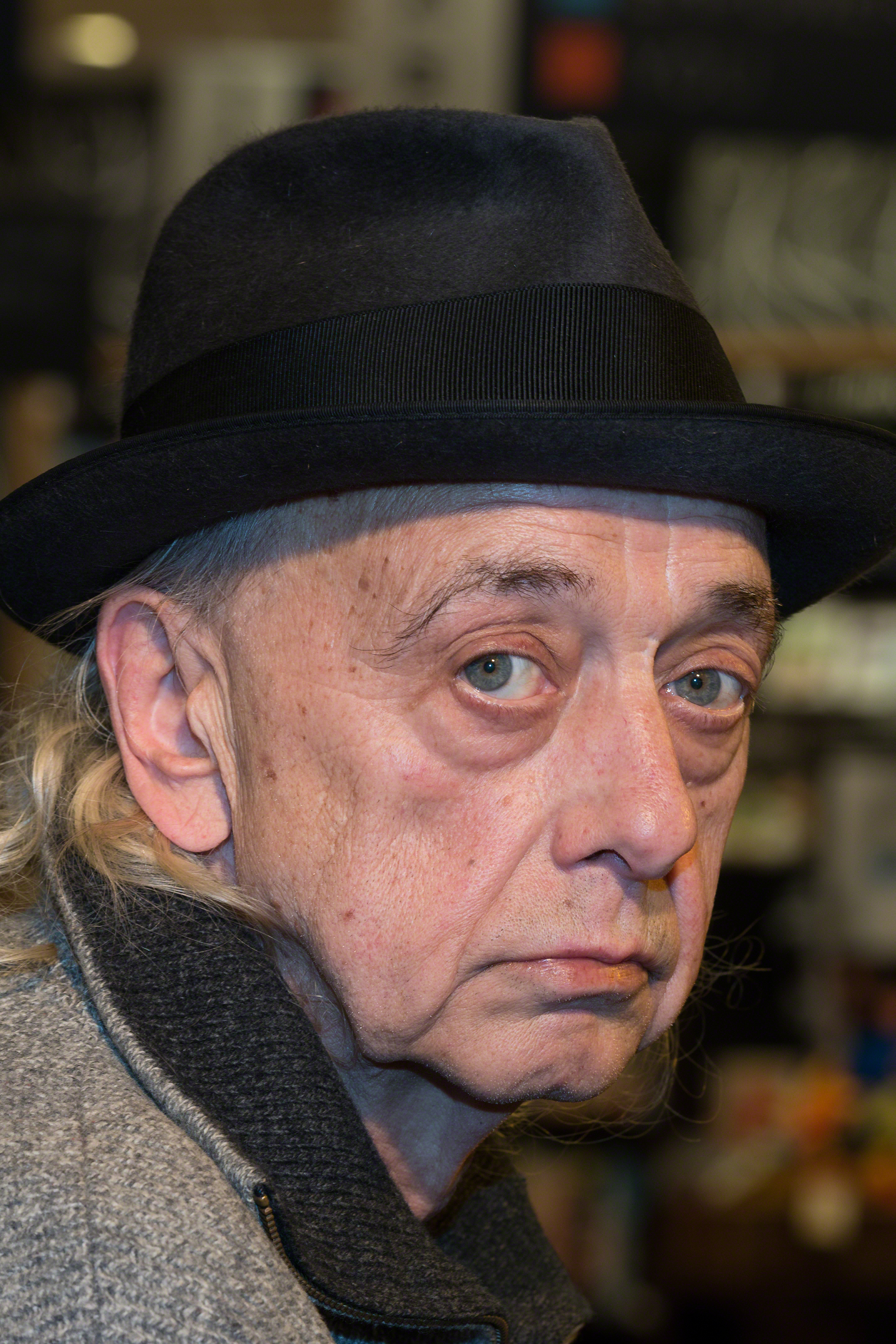
Behrens in 2014

=== Albums ===
- 1971 4 Times Sound Razing (with Silberbart)

=== Singles ===
- 1987 "Stunden der Einsamkeit"
- 1988 "Das Tor"
- 1990 "Sie kam Australien"
- 1990 "Dep De Dö Dep"
- 1991 "Der Purple-Lederhosen Lambada"
- 1992 "Immer nur Love" (with Elisabeth Volkmann)
- 2008 "Drei zwei" (with Drei Mann im Doppelbett)

== Filmography ==
- 1984: Thousand Eyes
- 1985: Andre Handles Them All
- 1985: Drei gegen Drei
- 1991: Manta – Der Film
