= Kralle Krawinkel =

German guitarist (1947–2014)

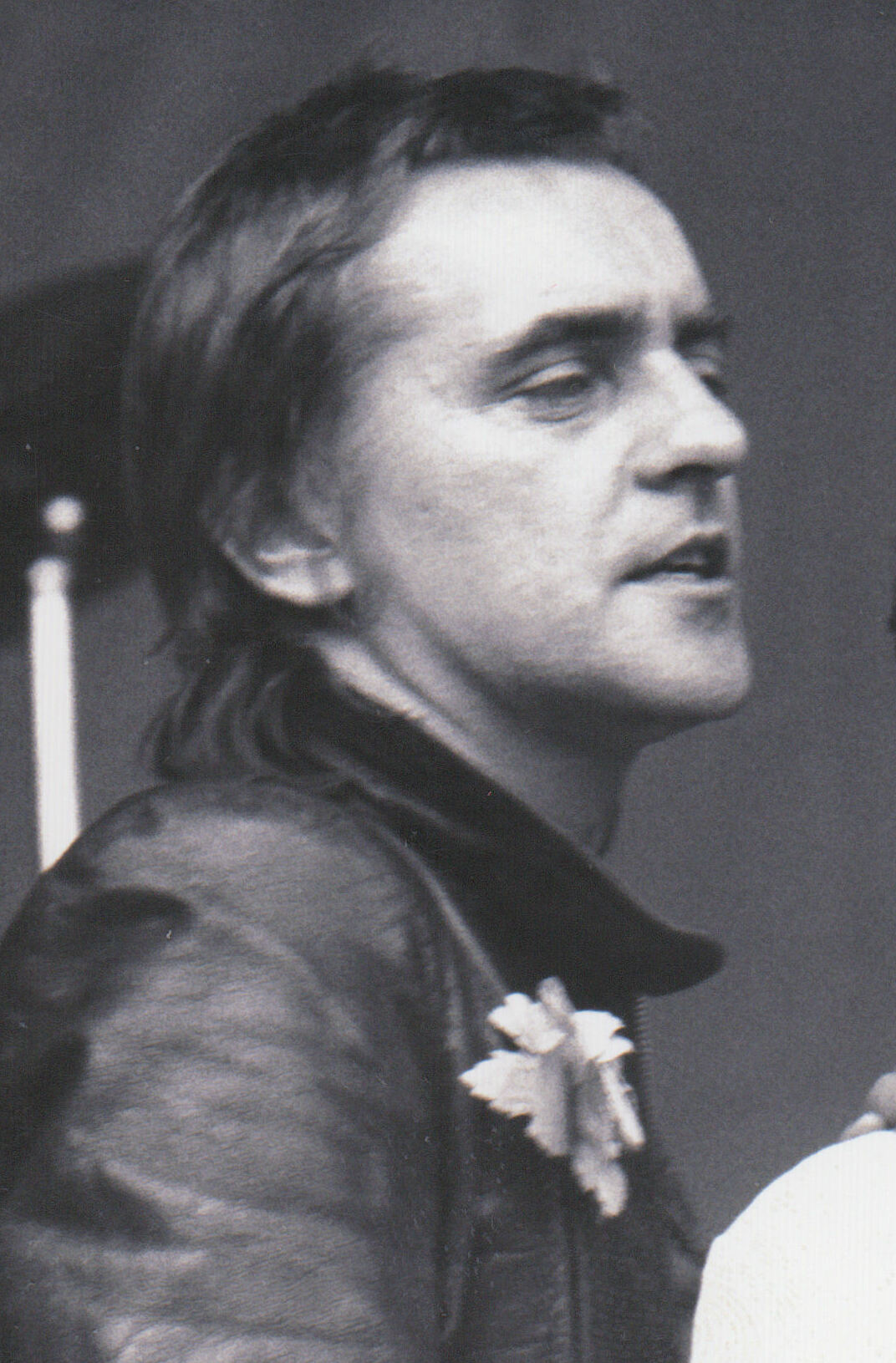

Background information
- Born: Gert Krawinkel; 21 April 1947; Wilhelmshaven, Lower Saxony, Germany
- Died: 16 February 2014 (aged 66) Cuxhaven, Lower Saxony, Germany
- Genres: New German Wave; Krautrock
- Occupations: Musician; actor; clown
- Instrument: Guitar

Gert "Kralle" Krawinkel (21 April 1947 – 16 February 2014) was a German musician, best known as the guitarist of the 1980s pop group Trio.

== Biography ==
Krawinkel's father was a sailor in his hometown of Wilhelmshaven, Lower Saxony. Krawinkel's music career started in the mid-1960s in nearby Bremerhaven, where he played the guitar in a band called "The Vampyr". He then teamed up with vocalist Stephan Remmler in a Rolling Stones-influenced band called MacBeats (later renamed Just Us). The band was successful in Northern Germany; during its existence, Just Us played a two-week engagement at Star-Club in Hamburg. In 1969, Just Us disbanded and Krawinkel started a new band called Cravinkel with some of its former members, including Remmler. Cravinkel's folk and progressive rock influences did not break them into the mainstream, despite the release of two studio albums. In 1972, after only three years, Cravinkel disbanded.

Krawinkel subsequently got a teaching job, but still played guitar in several bands, including the Emsland Hillbillies and George Meyer & Company. In 1979, he teamed up with his former bandmate Stephan Remmler in an attempt to get back into the commercial music business. After intensive rehearsals, they formed the band Trio with drummer Peter Behrens. In early 1980, they went on to become one of the best known bands of German new wave. While Remmler contributed most of the lyrics, Krawinkel came up with the music for about half of the songs. When Trio was on a creative break in 1984, he collaborated with Marius Müller-Westernhagen, playing lead guitar in his band. He was featured on his album "Die Sonne so rot" ("The Sun So Red") and went on his Westernhagen album tour in Germany. In 1986, Trio broke up for good.

In 1989, Krawinkel moved from Großenkneten to Berlin. In 1993, he worked with a friend Wilfried Szyslo, who was a musician, on a solo album called Kralle. Krawinkel had written the lyrics for the album entirely in English, but allowed another friend Rio Reiser to translate them into German. He sang a duet with Nena on the single "'n Zentimeter Liebe" ("One Centimeter of Love"). In 1998, Krawinkel got an entry in the Guinness Book of Records by riding the longest distance from Seville to Hamburg by horse.

Krawinkel later operated a private music studio in his adopted home near Seville and also maintained a home in Berlin. He was largely withdrawn from the public. His widow is television producer Monika Kölling, with whom he had a son. They met in 1985 during the shooting of the Trio feature film Drei gegen Drei ("Three Against Three"). Kölling was responsible for handling the extras.

Krawinkel was a heavy smoker and was diagnosed with lung cancer in late 2013. He died in Cuxhaven on 16 February 2014 at the age of 66 years, and was buried at sea.

== Discography ==
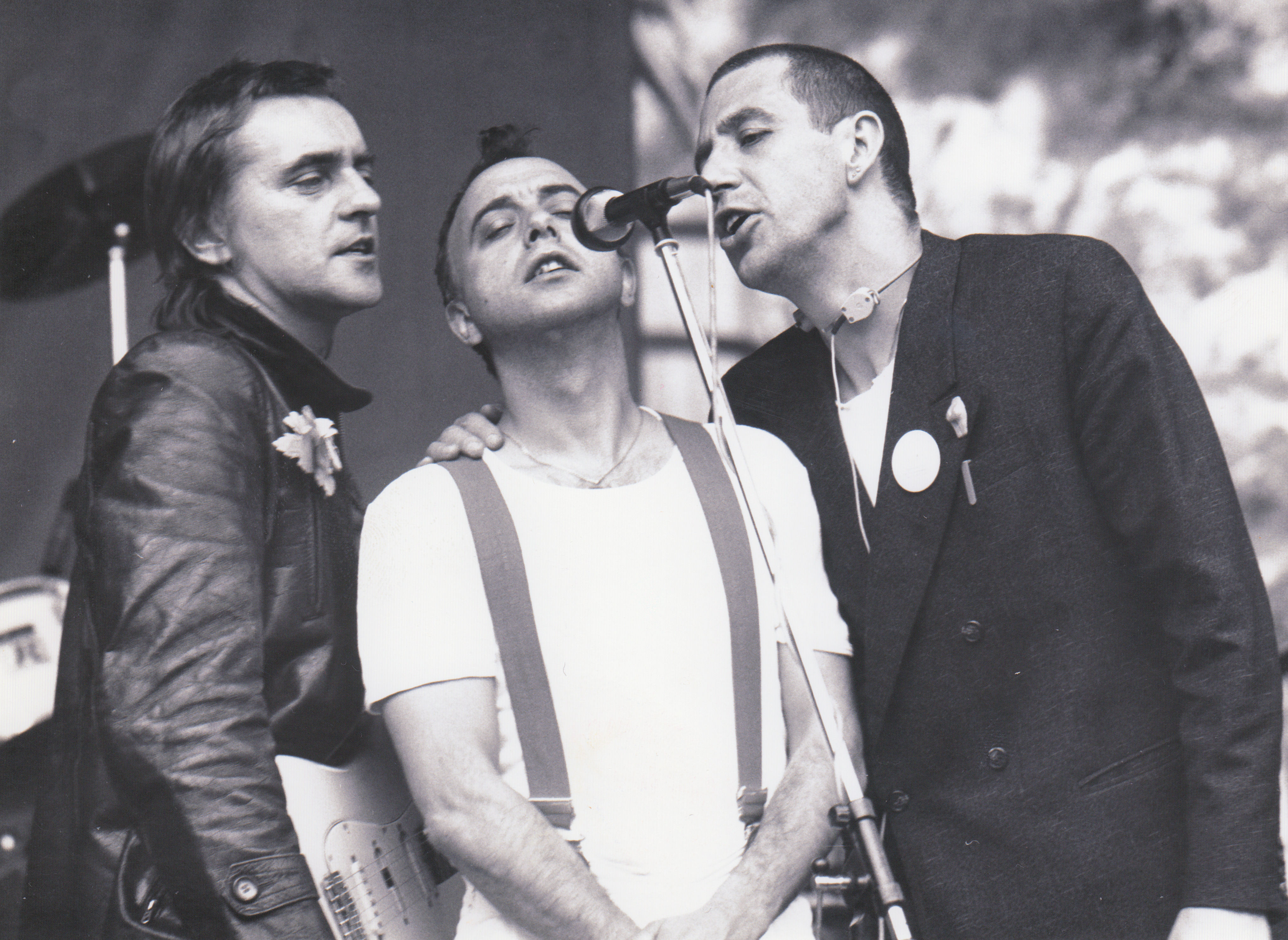
Krawinkel (left) with Trio in 1982

=== Albums ===
- 1970 LP Cravinkel: Cravinkel (1997 re-released on CD)
- 1971 LP Cravinkel: Garden of Loneliness
- 1972 LP George Meyer & Company: Holly Holy
- 1993 CD Kralle

=== Singles ===
- 1971 Cravinkel: Keep On Running
- 1993 Cadillac
- 1993 'n Zentimeter Liebe (feat. Nena)
