= Stephan Remmler =

German singer (born 1946)

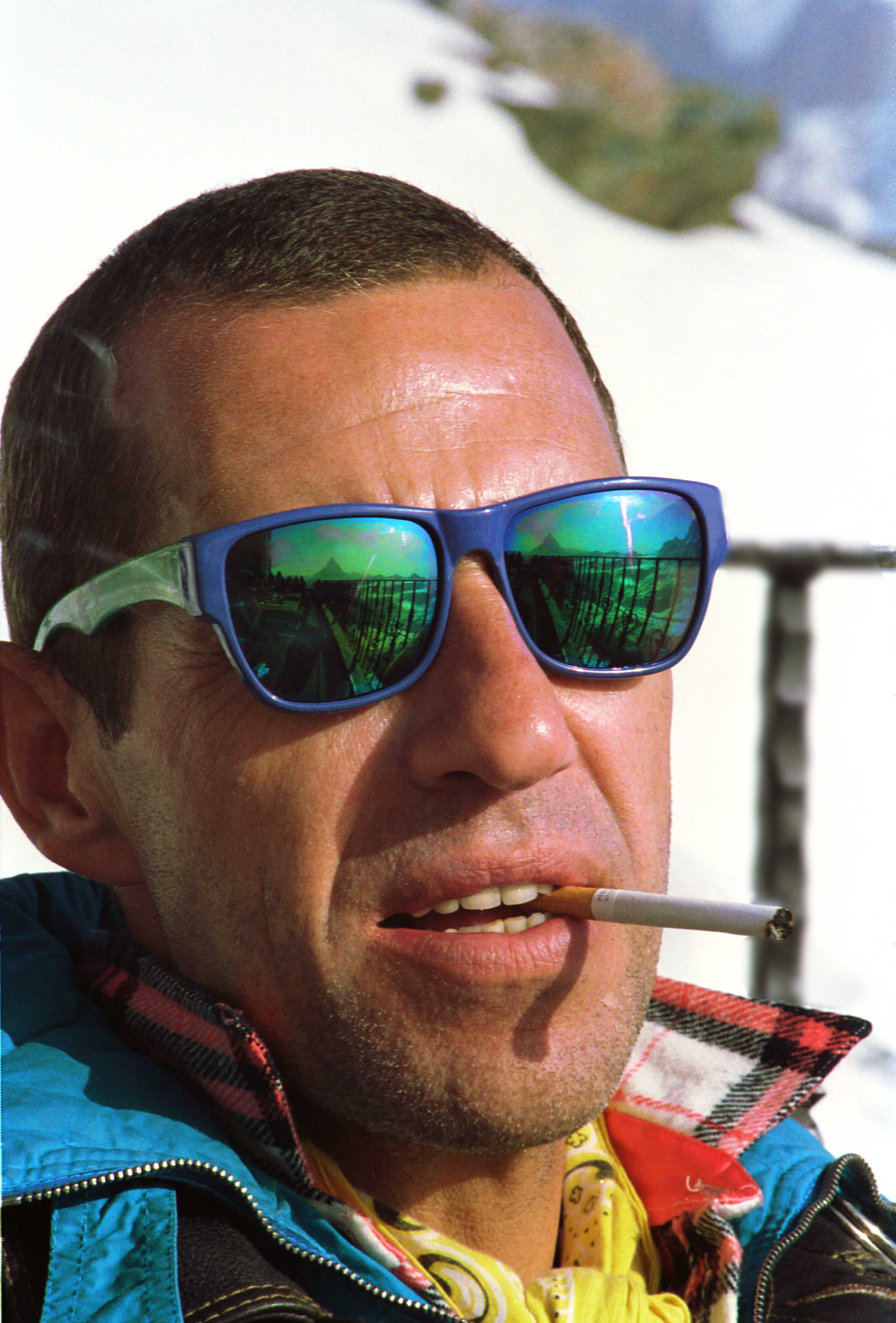
Remmler in 1997

Stephan Remmler (born 25 October 1946) is a German singer, composer and producer. He became famous as the lead singer of the German band Trio, alongside Gert Krawinkel, who played the guitar, and Peter Behrens, who played the drums. After the deaths of the other two, Remmler is the only surviving member of Trio.

After the split of Trio in 1986, Remmler continued his musical career as solo artist, releasing various singles and albums until 1996. His work contains Schlager and drinking songs as well. His biggest hits were Keine Sterne in Athen (1986, released in English as I don't go to U.S.A. in 1987) and Alles hat ein Ende (nur die Wurst hat zwei) in 1987. His 1990s releases did tend more to rock music. Remmler left the music business in 1996 and took a ten-year break before his comeback in 2006.

Other than singing, he also played keyboards on particular songs of both Trio and his solo project.

Remmler was born in Witten, North Rhine-Westphalia. He currently lives with his family in Las Breñas, on Lanzarote, Spain.
