= Neue Deutsche Welle =

Genre of German rock music

- Stylistic origins: New wave; post-punk; synth-pop; schlager; krautrock
- Cultural origins: Late 1970s, West Germany
- Typical instruments: Electric guitar; drums; bass; keyboard

Other topics
- New wave; German rock; German music; Neue Deutsche Härte

Neue Deutsche Welle (NDW, pronounced [ˈnɔʏə ˈdɔʏtʃə ˈvɛlə], "new German wave") is a genre of West German rock music originally derived from post-punk and new wave with electronic influences. The term was coined by Dutch radio DJ Frits Ritmeester (Frits Spits) on the nationwide radio station Hilversum 3, which was very popular among German listeners. Soon after that, the term was used in a record-shop advertisement by Burkhardt Seiler in an August 1979 issue of the West German magazine Sounds. It was then used by journalist Alfred Hilsberg in an October 1979 Sounds article about the movement, titled Neue Deutsche Welle — Aus grauer Städte Mauern ("new German wave—from the walls of grey cities").

== History ==
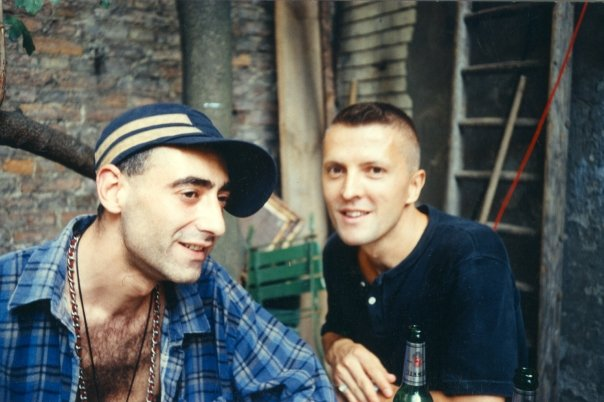
D.A.F. (Delgado-López left, Görl right)

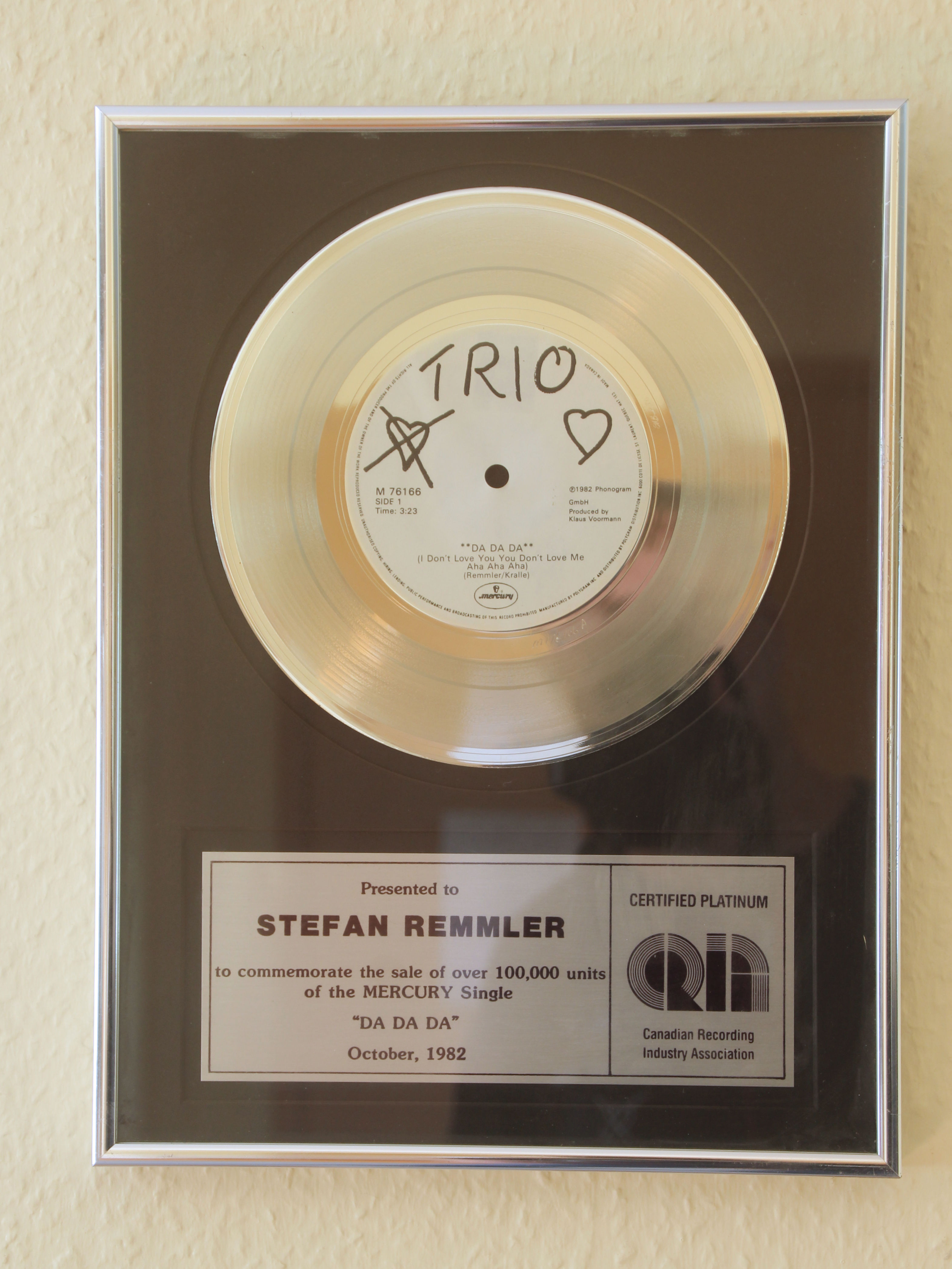
Platinum record for Trio's "Da Da Da", issued by the Canadian Recording Industry Association in October 1982

The history of Neue Deutsche Welle consists of two major parts. From its beginnings to 1981, the genre was mostly an underground movement with roots in British punk and new wave music. It quickly developed into an original and distinct style, influenced in no small part by the sound and rhythm of the German language, which many of the bands had adopted early on. Whilst some of the lyrics of artists like Nena and Ideal epitomized the zeitgeist of urban West Germany during the Cold War, others used the language in a surreal way, merely playing with its sound or graphic quality rather than using it to express meaning. This includes bands and artists such as Spliff, Joachim Witt, and Trio.

The main centers of the NDW movement during these years were West Berlin, Düsseldorf, Hamburg, Hanover, Hagen, Zurich, and Bern, as well as, to a lesser extent, the Frankfurt Rhein-Main Region, Limburg an der Lahn, and Vienna.

From about 1980 on, the music industry began noticing Neue Deutsche Welle. However, because of the idiosyncratic nature of the music, focus shifted to creating new bands more compatible with the mainstream rather than promoting existing ones. Many one-hit wonders and short-lived groups appeared and were forgotten again in rapid succession. The overly broad application of the NDW label to these bands, as well as to almost any German musicians not using English lyrics, even if their music was apparently not influenced at all by the original NDW sound, quickly led to the decay of the entire genre when many of the original musicians turned their backs in frustration.

A revival of interest in the style in the Anglophone world occurred in 2003, with the release of DJ Hell's compilation New Deutsch. NDW has come to be acknowledged as a forerunner to later developments in dance-punk, electronic body music, and electroclash.

== See also ==
- Cold wave
- Electropunk
- Neue Deutsche Todeskunst
